= Q class =

Q Class or Class Q may refer to:

== Rail transport ==
- GNRI Class Q, a Great Northern Railway of Ireland locomotive class
- NZR Q class (1878), a New Zealand Railways locomotive class
- NZR Q class (1901), a New Zealand Railways locomotive class
- South Australian Railways Q class, a South Australian Railways locomotive class
- SR Class Q, a British Southern Railway locomotive class
- Tasmanian Government Railways Q class, steam locomotive class
- Victorian Railways Q class, steam locomotive class
- WAGR Q class, steam locomotive class
- WAGR Q class (1895), steam locomotive class
- WAGR Q class (diesel)
- Q-class Melbourne tram

== Other uses ==
- Library of Congress Classification:Class Q -- Science
- Q-class destroyer, a class of warships used by the Royal Navy, Royal Netherlands Navy, and Royal Australian Navy
- Classical Quarterly, abbreviated Class. Q.
