= Western Australian Government Railways Q class =

Western Australian Government Railway Q class may refer to one of the following locomotives:

- WAGR Q class (1895)
- WAGR Q class
