= List of vehicles and machines powered by MTU engines =

Vehicles powered by MTU engines

== Trains and locomotives ==
Diesel engines were built in the 1960s under the Maybach name, later engines were built under the MTU name.

- Bombardier Talent and Turbostar DMUs
- Brookville BL20G and BL20GH locomotives
- Brookville BL36PH locomotive
- CSR Qishuyan SDA2, one 20V4000R43 engine
- CSR Ziyang SDA1, one 20V4000R43L engine
- DB Class V 160 (Maybach)
- IE 22000 Class
- SNCF Class BB 75000 and SNCF Class BB 69400
- NS DE 6400
- Bombardier Traxx diesel
- Siemens Eurorunner and Asiarunner
- Korail Diesel Hydraulic Car by "Saemaul" Train, MTU 12V 396TC-13(Early type only) MTU 16V 396TC-13(Mid, late type) MTU 8V 183TC-12( For HEP engine. Mid, late type only)
- Voith Gravita Locomotive family
- New Zealand DL class locomotive
- South African Class 45-000, one MTU 20V 4000 R63L engine
- Krauss-Maffei ML 4000, two Maybach MD870 engines
- Sri Lanka Railways S8 DMUs
- Sri Lanka Railways S9 DMUs
- Sri Lanka Railways S10 DMUs
- Sri Lanka Railways S12 DMUs
- Stadler GTW DMUs
- Pesa Link DMUs
- CAF Bitrac
- Vossloh G6

=== United Kingdom ===
- Class 35, Maybach MD870 engine built under licence in UK by Bristol Siddeley
- Class 42, two Maybach MD650 engines built under licence in UK by Bristol Siddeley
- Class 52, two Maybach MD655 engines
- Class 73/9, one MTU 8V 4000 R43L engine
- Class 168, Class 170 and Class 171: MTU 6R 183TD series (one per car)
- Class 172: MTU 6H1800R83 (one per car)
- NIR Class 4000: MTU 6H1800R84 (one per car)
- Class 195, Class 196 and Class 197: MTU 6H1800R85L (one per car)
- Class 43s: MTU 16V4000 R41R widely installed in early 2000s, replacing original Paxman Valenta engines.
- The MTU 12V 1600 R80L for the bi-mode Class 800 and Class 802 (three per five car set and five per nine car set), also the electric Class 801 (one per set for emergency use only)
- The MTU 12V 1600 R81L for the bi-mode Class 805 (three per set)
- The MTU 12V 1600 R91 for the bi-mode Class 810 (four per set)
- The Eurailscout UFM160 Track Recording Train (DB999700/701) was powered by MTU Diesel Engines, coupled to Voith Transmission and ZF Final Drive units

== Vehicles ==
- Haul trucks
  - Belaz 75600
- Agricultural tractors
  - Deutz-Fahr 11-series tractor

== Marine applications ==
- Ships
  - Yachts
    - Azimut Yachts
    - Deva
    - Indian Empress
    - No. 1
    - Octopus
    - Predator
    - Rising Sun
    - Sunrays
    - Sunseeker
  - Ferries
    - BatamFast ferries
    - Benchijigua Express
    - Bintan Resort ferries
    - Hawaii Superferry
    - HSC Lake Express
    - MV Jean de La Valette
    - Majestic Fast ferries
    - Sindo Ferry ferries
  - Fireboats
    - Three Forty Three
    - Fire Fighter II
  - Frigates and corvettes
    - Absalon-class support ship
    - Anzac-class frigates
    - Bremen-class frigates
    - Brandenburg-class frigates
    - Independence-class littoral combat ship
    - Iver Huitfeldt-class frigates
    - Legend-class cutters
    - Luyang II-class destroyers
    - Sa'ar 5-class corvettes
    - Sachsen-class frigates
    - Some PR-72P-class corvettes
    - Vasco da Gama-class frigates
    - Visby-class corvettes
    - Vosper Thornycroft MK9 corvettes
    - Many other MEKO type frigates and corvettes
    - Nilgiri-class frigates
    - Arnala-class corvettes
  - Small combatants
    - Albatros-class fast attack craft
    - Flyvefisken-class patrol vesselArnala0c
    - Gepard-class fast attack craft
    - Fearless-class patrol vessels
    - Mantilla-class patrol vessel
    - Sa'ar 4-class missile boats
    - Sa'ar 4.5-class missile boats
    - Sentinel-class cutters
    - Turunmaa-class gunboats
    - Tiger-class fast attack craft
  - Mine warfare ships
    - Frankenthal-class minehunters
    - Alta-class minesweepers
    - Ensdorf-class minesweepers
    - Kulmbach-class mine hunters
  - Submarines
    - Dolphin-class submarines
    - Gotland-class submarines
    - Ula-class submarines
    - Type 206 submarines
    - Type 209 submarines
    - Type 212 submarines
    - Type 214 submarines
  - Training Ships
    - USCGC Eagle (WIX-327) (installed during 2017 refit)
    - Italian training ship Amerigo Vespucci (installed during 2016 refit)
