= Downer Rail =

Rolling stock manufacturer

- Industry: Engineering
- Predecessor: Evans Deakin Industries
- Founded: March 2001
- Headquarters: North Ryde, New South Wales
- Number of locations: Cardiff, New South Wales; Somerton, Victoria; Maryborough, Queensland
- Products: Railway rolling stock
- Services: Rail Infrastructure management Railway locomotive leasing
- Revenue: $1.336 billion (June 2013)
- Parent: Downer Group
- Subsidiaries: Keolis Downer (49%); Locomotive Demand Power
- Website: www.downergroup.com

Downer Rail is a business unit within the Downer Group. As well as manufacturing and maintaining railway rolling stock it holds maintenance contracts to maintain rail infrastructure. The head office is located in North Ryde.

== History ==
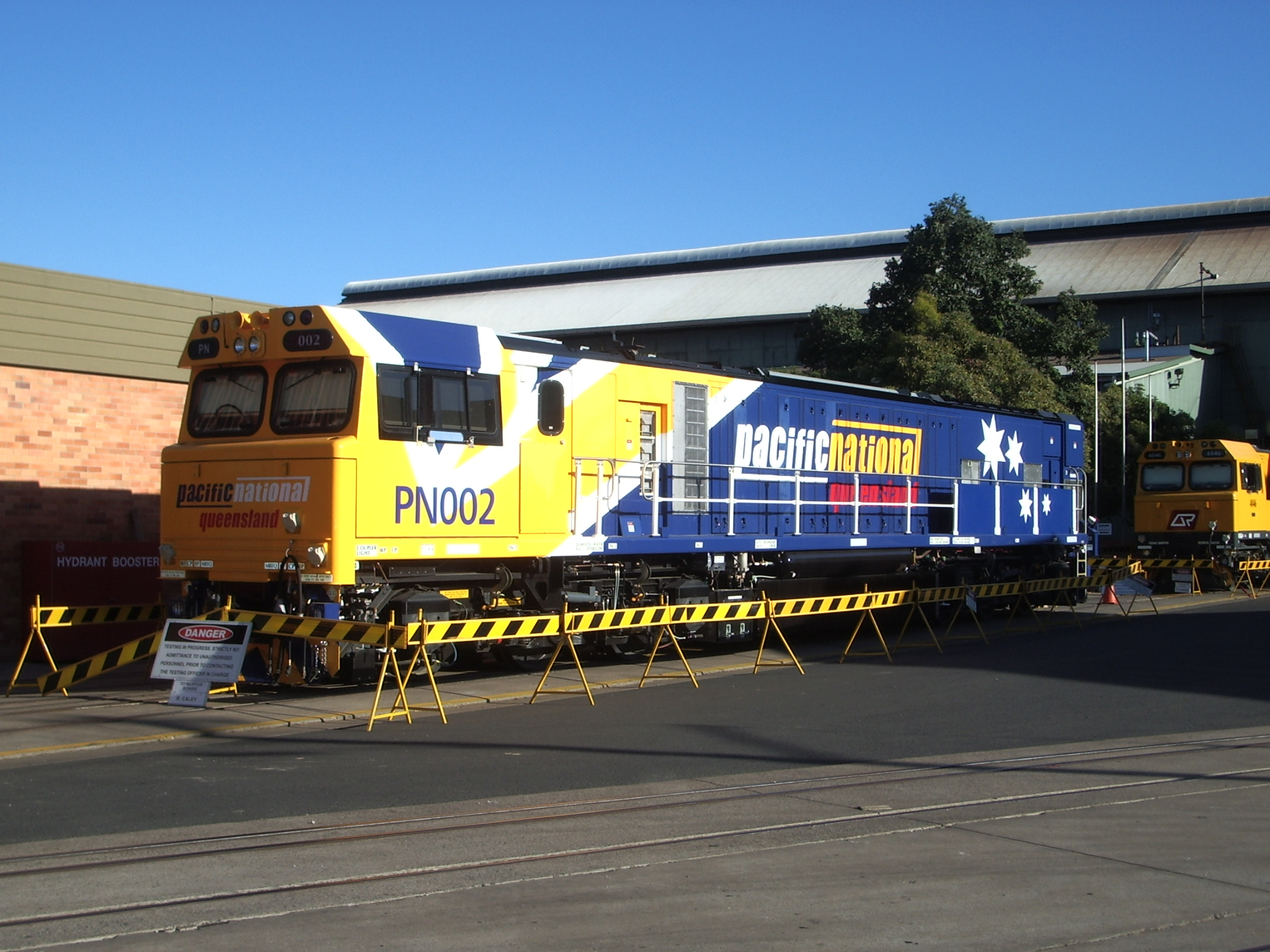
Pacific National GT42CU AC at Maryborough factory in November 2004.

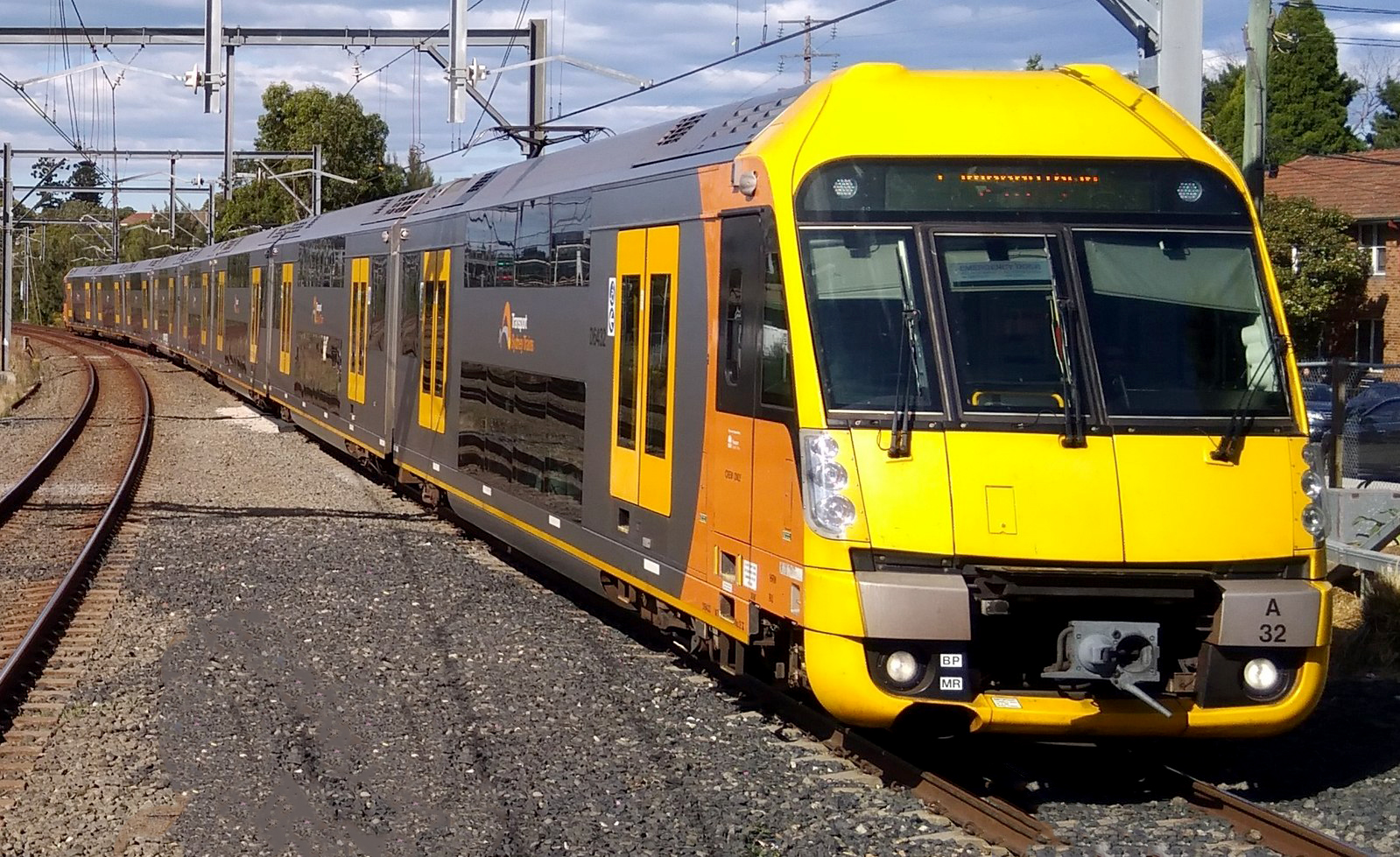
New South Wales A set

Transperth B-series train

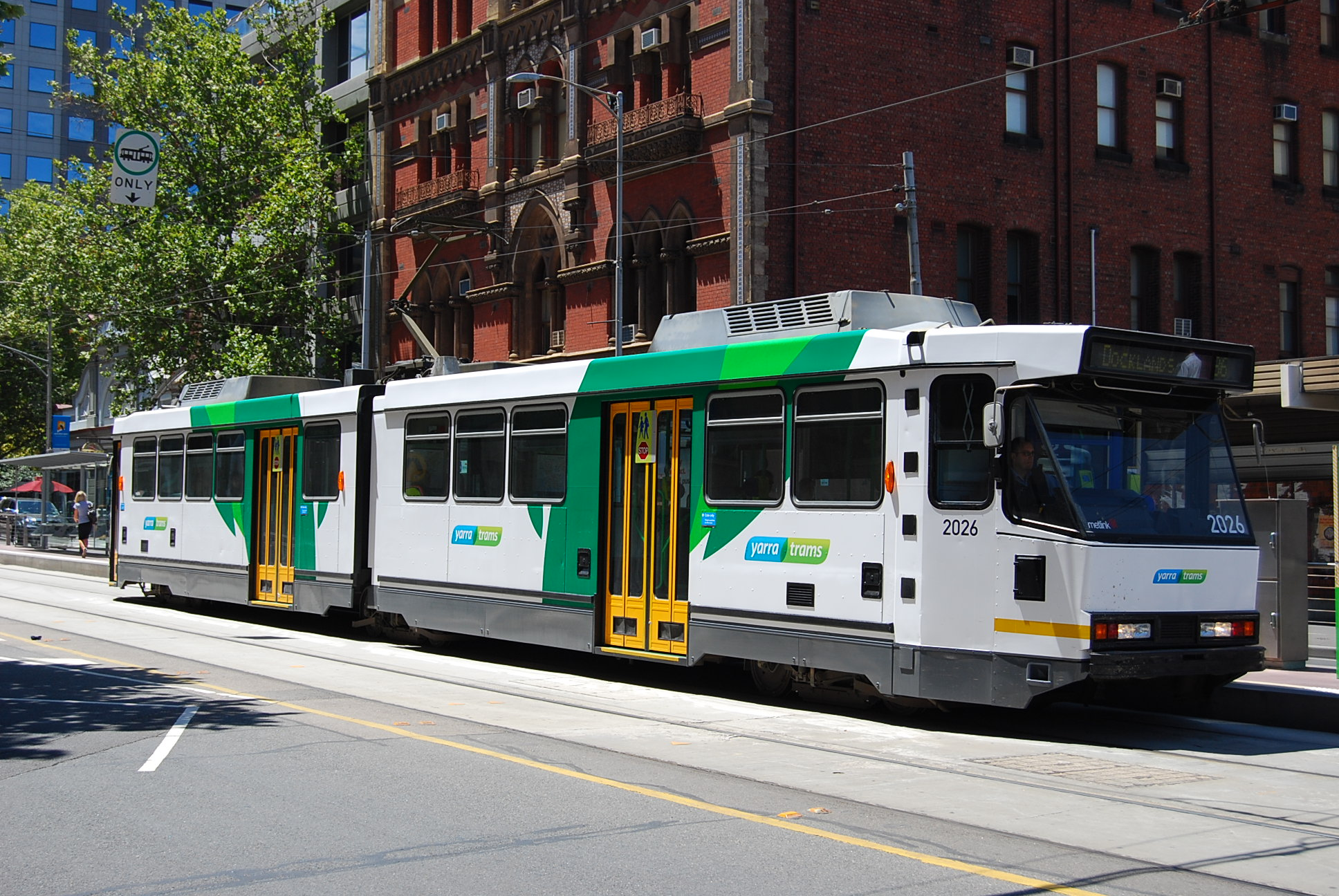
Yarra Trams B-class Melbourne tram in Melbourne.

The EDI Rail division was formed in March 2001 following the merger of Evans Deakin Industries and Downer Group to form Downer EDi. In July 2007 the division was renamed Downer Rail and in 2018 it merged with Downer's Infrastructure Services division to form Transport and Infrastructure.

The history of Downer Rail began in 1867 when Walkers Limited opened a branch in Maryborough. In 1980 Walkers Limited was sold to Evans Deakin Industries and included in the merger with Downer EDi.

Evans Deakin operated the former Clyde Engineering plants at Kelso and Somerton and Walkers Limited, Maryborough plant. It had recently reopened the former Cardiff Locomotive Workshops to build Sydney Trains M sets.

In 2008 Locomotive Demand Power was established as a subsidiary to lease locomotives. In November 2009 Downer Rail became a tram operator through its 49% shareholding in Keolis Downer that operates the Yarra Trams franchise in Melbourne. In July 2014, Keolis Downer commenced operating the G:link light rail line on the Gold Coast. In March 2015, Keolis Downer purchased bus operator Australian Transit Enterprises which operates the Hornibrook Bus Lines, Link SA, Path Transit and SouthLink operations with 930 buses.

In July 2025, it was announced that Keolis would purchase Downer's 49% stake in the Keolis Downer joint venture. The sale is expected to be completed by late 2025.

== Products ==
Downer Rail has manufactured items of rolling stock at its factories in Cardiff, Somerton, Maryborough and Port Augusta. As the ex-licence holder for Electro-Motive Diesel products it has also been involved in the procurement and maintenance of over 150 American built EMD SD70 series locomotives for BHP and Fortescue Metals Group's Pilbara operations.

=== Diesel Locomotives ===
- GT42CU AC – 62 built at Maryborough for Pacific National and QR National
- GT42CU ACe – 131 built at Maryborough for Genesee & Wyoming Australia, Locomotive Demand Power, Pacific National and QR National
- GT46C – 5 built at Port Augusta and Somerton for Westrail, FreightLink and Freight Australia
- GT46C ACe – 76 built at Cardiff for Genesee & Wyoming Australia, Pacific National, QR National, SCT Logistics, Southern Shorthaul Railroad and Whitehaven Coal, now built by EMD

=== Electric Multiple Units ===
- New South Wales M sets – 141 carriages built at Cardiff
- New South Wales A sets – 626 carriages assembled at Cardiff
- New South Wales B sets – 328 carriages assembled at Cardiff
- QR Interurban Multiple Unit 160 series – 84 carriages built at Maryborough
- QR Suburban Multiple Unit 260 series – 114 carriages built at Maryborough
- Transperth B series – 234 carriages built at Maryborough
- High Capacity Metro Trains – 455 carriages assembled by Downer at Newport Workshops. Carriage shell and other selected components are built in Changchun, China by CRRC Changchun Railway Vehicles.

=== Tilt Trains ===
- Diesel Tilt Train – 6 power cars and 32 carriages built at Maryborough

== Services ==
=== Locomotive leasing ===
- Locomotive Demand Power is a subsidiary offering locomotives for lease. As at January 2014 thirteen standard gauge GT46s and six narrow gauge GT42s had been built at Cardiff and Maryborough respectively with nine of the former leased to Aurizon.

=== Light rail ===
- 49% shareholding in Keolis Downer joint venture with Keolis, trading as Yarra Trams, that has operated the Melbourne tram network since November 2009 and the G:link light rail network since July 2014.

=== Infrastructure projects ===
- Northern Sydney Freight Corridor built two loops north of Gosford in 2014

=== Maintenance contracts ===
- Australian Rail Track Corporation contract to maintain 2,000 kilometres of track in New South Wales and Victoria
- Leigh Creek line maintenance contract until 2017
- 50% shareholding in a joint venture with Bombardier Transportation to maintain the A-series, B-series and Transwa Australind trains for the Public Transport Authority until June 2019
- 10-year contract to maintain 300 locomotives for 10 years from February 2015 for Pacific National
- 25-year contract to maintain B sets for Sydney Trains
