= Downer EDI Rail GT42CU AC =

Model of Australian diesel-electric locomotive

GT42CU AC
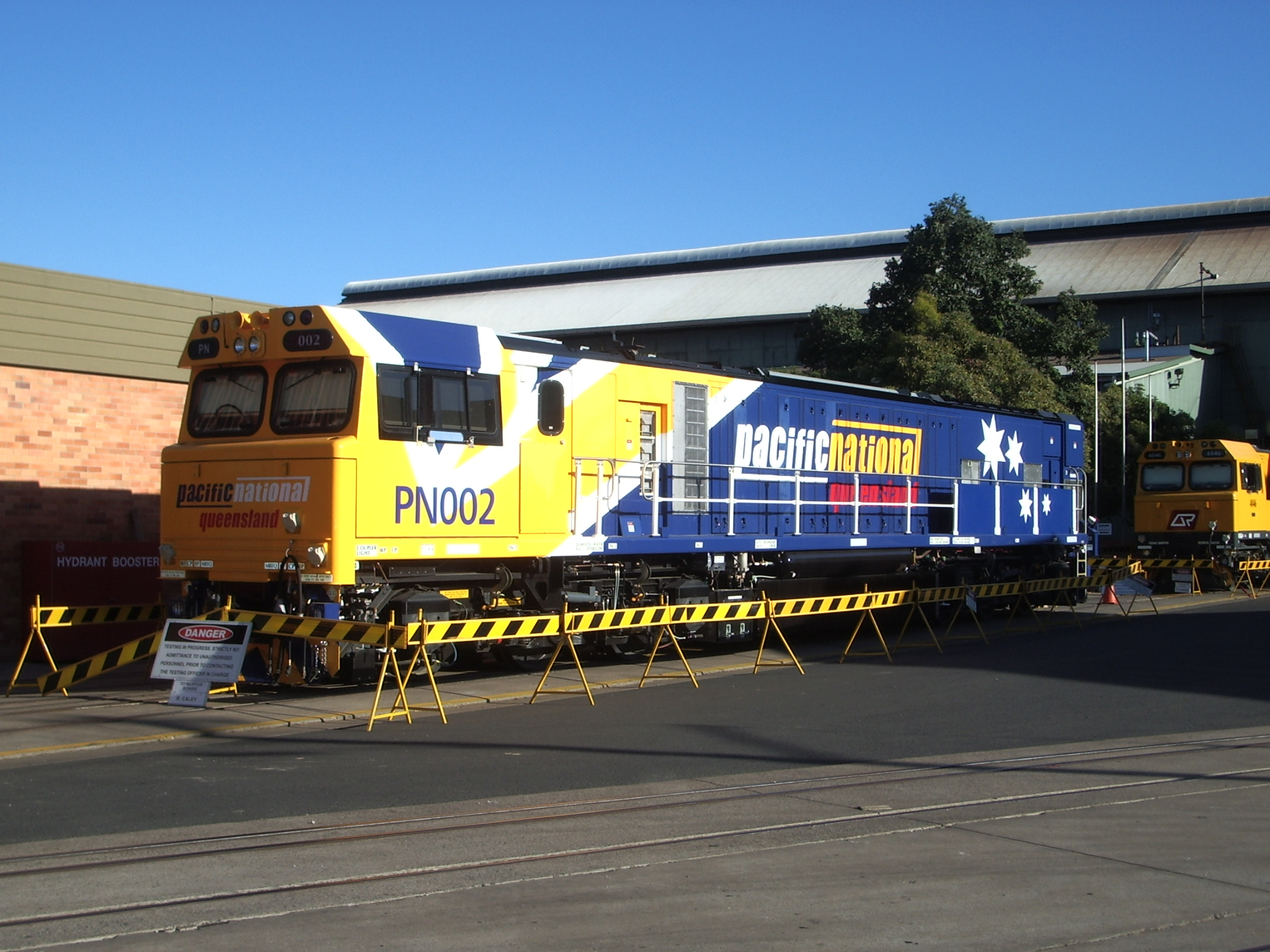
- Pacific National PN002 & Aurizon 4046 under construction at EDi Rail, Maryborough in November 2004
Type and origin
- Power type: Diesel-electric
- Builder: EDi Rail, Maryborough
- Model: EMD GT42CU AC
- Build date: 1999–2005
- Total produced: 61
Specifications
- Configuration
  - UIC: Co'Co'
- Gauge: 1,067 mm (3 ft 6 in)
- Length: 20.8 m (68 ft 3 in)
- Width: 2.85 m (9 ft 4 in)
- Height: 3.87 m (12 ft 8 in)
- Loco weight: 120 t (120 long tons; 130 short tons)
- Fuel type: Diesel
- Prime mover: EMD 12N-710G3B-ES
- Engine type: V12 Diesel engine
- Alternator: EMD TA12-QBE/CA7C (4000 class)
- Traction motors: Siemens 1TB 2622
- Cylinders: 12
- Cylinder size: 11.63 L (710 cu in)
- Loco brake: Dynamic
- Train brakes: NYAB/Knorr CCB II
Performance figures
- Maximum speed: 100 km/h (62 mph)
- Power output: 2,460 kW (3,300 hp)
- Tractive effort: 460 kN (100,000 lbf)
Career
- Operators: Pacific National; Aurizon
- Number in class: 61
- Numbers: 4001–4049; PN001–PN013
- Delivered: 23 October 1999
- First run: 1999
- Last run: 2005
- Current owner: Aurizon; Pacific National
- Disposition: 61 in service

The GT42CU AC is a model of diesel electric locomotives manufactured by EDi Rail, Maryborough, Queensland, Australia. between 1999 and 2005 under licence from Electro-Motive Diesel, for use on narrow gauge railways in Queensland.

== History ==
In March 1998, Queensland Rail ordered 38 GT42CU ACs from Clyde Engineering. They were the first locomotives ordered from Clyde Engineering after its takeover by Evans Deakin Industries and were built at the latter's Maryborough factory.

Designated the 4000 class, the first was delivered in October 1999. After an extensive evaluation process, the first entered service in May 2000 with all in service by May 2001. The dramatic increase in tractive effort and adhesion of the AC traction motors compared to the previous DC traction locos exceeded all expectations and revolutionised diesel operations in Queensland. A further 11 were ordered in March 2003 and entered service in 2004–05.

They are primarily used on the Blackwater and Moura coal networks, and on phosphate trains between Mount Isa and Townsville. All were included in the transfer of Queensland Rail's freight business to Aurizon in 2012.

In February 2004, Pacific National ordered 13 GT42CU ACs to commence operations in Queensland. Designated the PN class, they entered service in 2005 and are used on intermodal services on the North Coast line between Brisbane and Cairns.

The design evolved into the GT42CU ACe which has different computer system and traction motors.

== Fleet ==
Operator	Class	Number in class	Road numbers	Built
Aurizon	4000	46	4001–4049	1999–2005
Pacific National	PN	13	PN001-PN013	2005
Progress Rail	PRA	1	PRQ001 (Was 4017)	2024
One Rail Australia	ORQ	1	ORQ026 (was 4026)	2024

== Related Development ==
- UGL Rail C44aci, standard gauge competitor
- Downer EDI Rail GT46C, standard gauge variant
- Downer EDI Rail GT46C ACe, standard gauge successor
- Downer EDI Rail GT42CU ACe, successor
