= Downer EDI Rail GT46C ACe =

Australian diesel-electric locomotive class

Downer EDI Rail GT46C-ACe
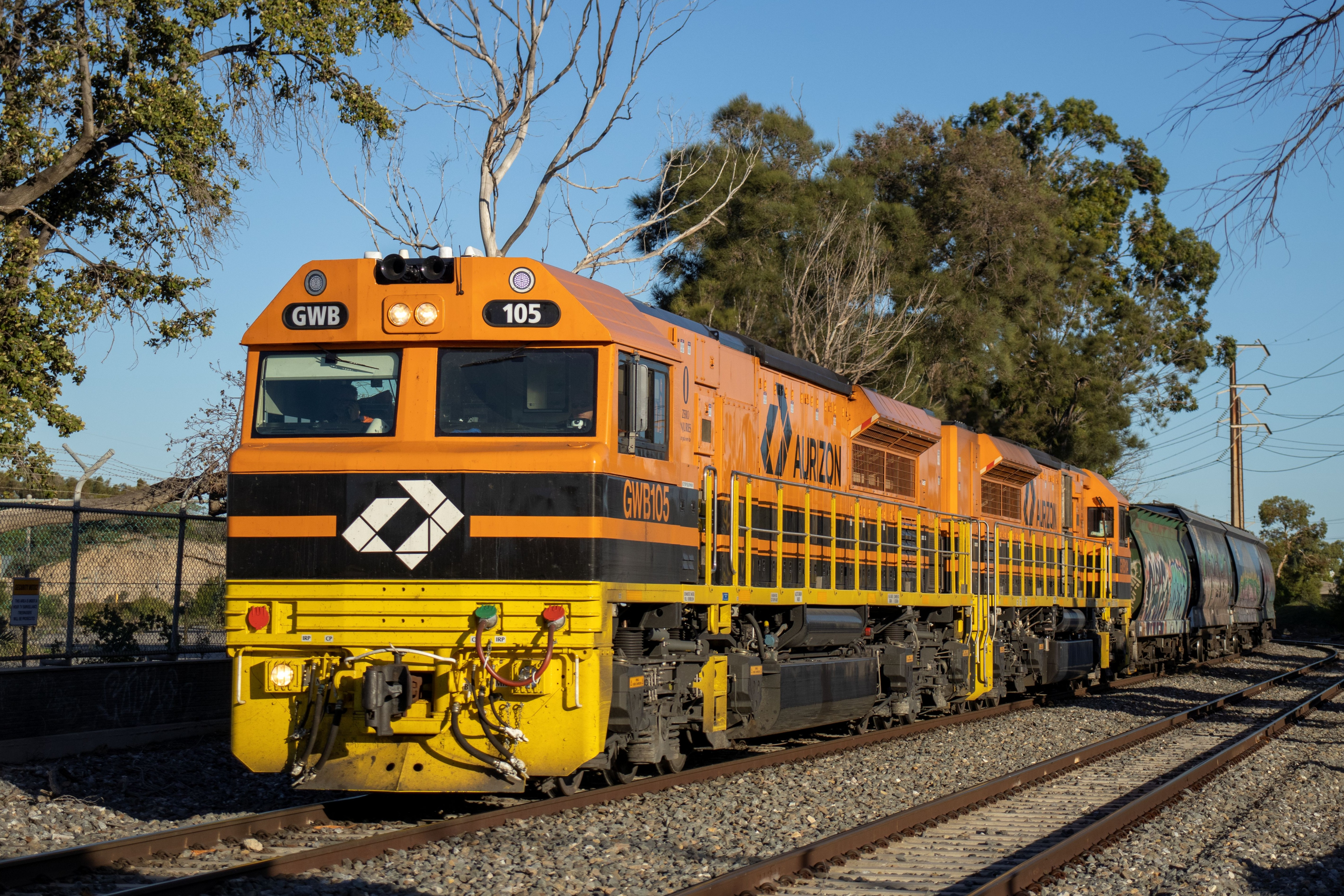
- Aurizon GWB class locomotive hauling a loaded grain train through Osborne, South Australia in June 2023
Type and origin
- Power type: Diesel-electric
- Builder: EDI Rail, Cardiff (GT46C-ACe), Progress Rail, Muncie, Indiana (GT46C-ACe Gen II)
- Model: Electro-Motive Diesel GT46C-ACe
- Build date: 2007–present
- Total produced: 107
Specifications
- Configuration
  - UIC: Co-Co
- Gauge: 1,435 mm (4 ft 8 1/2 in)
- Length: 21.2 m (69 ft 7 in)
- Loco weight: 134 t (132 long tons; 148 short tons); 139 t (137 long tons; 153 short tons)
- Fuel type: Diesel
- Prime mover: EMD 16-710G3C-ES
- Alternator: EMD TA17-CA9E
- Traction motors: Siemens 1TB 2630
Performance figures
- Maximum speed: 115 km/h (71 mph)
- Power output: Gross (BHP): 4,500 hp (3,356 kW); Net (THP): 4,300 hp (3,207 kW)
- Tractive effort: Starting: 600 kN (134,885 lbf); Continuous: 520kN@19km/h (116,900lbf@11.8mph)
Career
- Operators: Aurizon; Pacific National; SCT Logistics; Whitehaven Coal; Southern Shorthaul Railroad; Qube Holdings
- Delivered: 2007-present
- First run: 2007
- Current owner: Aurizon; Pacific National; SCT Logistics; Whitehaven Coal; Southern Shorthaul Railroad; Manildra Group; Qube Holdings
- Disposition: 100 in service, 1 scrapped

The GT46C-ACe is a model of Australian diesel-electric locomotive designed and built by Downer Rail at its Cardiff Locomotive Workshops using Electro-Motive Diesel components until 2014, with later units built in Muncie, Indiana.

== Design ==
The class was a new design for Australian conditions based on other locomotives produced by Downer EDI Rail, such as the narrow gauge GT42CU AC purchased by Queensland Rail and Pacific National and the GT46C purchased by Westrail, Freight Australia and FreightLink. The GT42CU AC used a 12-cylinder EMD 710 engine, based on the US-built SD70MAC with scaled-down traction motors, while the GT46C used a 16-cylinder EMD 710 engine with DC traction systems. The American SD70ACe was EMD's second-generation AC loco with IGBT inverters, but was too large and heavy for the Australian interstate standard gauge network, weighing in at 188 tonnes when the limit was 134 tonnes. In addition, the GT46C design was already at the 134 tonne limit, even before adding inverters, heavier traction motors and more cooling capacity for the higher power engine, and there was a requirement that fuel capacity could not be sacrificed.

The locomotive has AC traction equipment, with a Mitsubishi Electric package also used on the SD70ACe, including a TA17 traction alternator, CA9E companion alternator and six ITB 2630 traction motors, along with solid state IGBT inverters. The prime mover is a turbocharged 16-cylinder EMD 710. New technology used included passive steer bogies, to reduce flange wear on curves. Until local production ceased in 2014, the class were built at Cardiff except for frames constructed at Port Augusta and bogie frames at Kelso. Newer versions of this locomotive have been built in the US since 2014.

== Variations by class ==
=== SCT class ===
The SCT class are used by SCT Logistics on their freight services from Adelaide to Melbourne, Parkes and Perth. Locomotive SCT007 is named Geoff (James Bond) Smith after the CEO of the company. The benefits of AC traction has enabled a fleet of 15 locomotives to do the work of 20 DC traction equipped locomotives, three AC vs four DC units being needed on the Melbourne to Adelaide journey, and two AC vs three DC units between Adelaide to Perth. An on-train refuelling system carries 50,000 litres (13,000 US gallons) of diesel fuel in a tank car behind the locomotives, eliminating the need to refuel en route.

=== TT class and LDP class ===
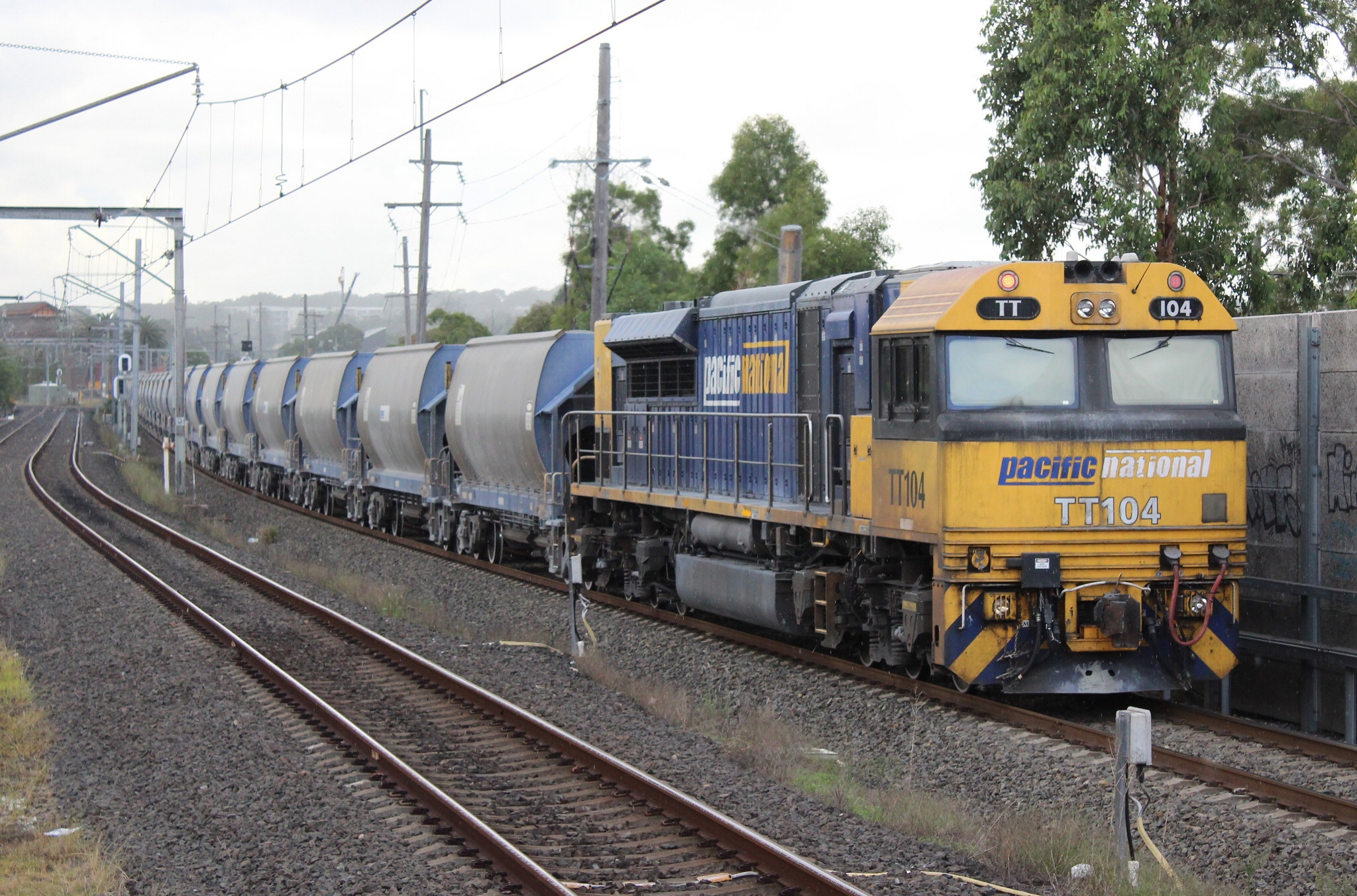
TT104 trailing on a Pacific National minerals train in Sefton, NSW

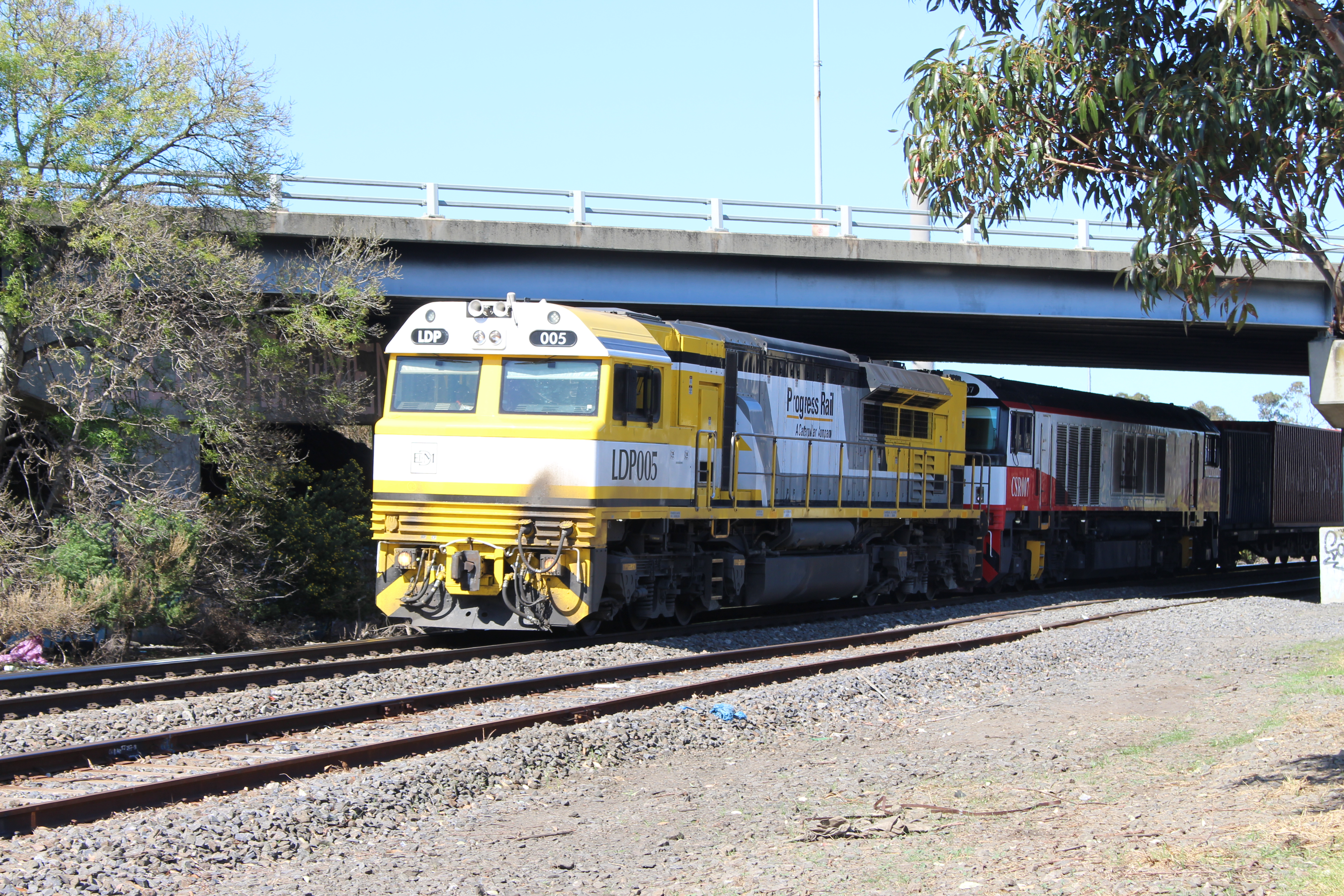
LDP005 wearing its one-off livery.

With the ageing of the 48 and PL-class fleets, Pacific National purchased 31 TT class locomotives for Hunter Valley traffic. They are equipped with ECP brakes and are used with NHDH, NHEH and NHYH hoppers. They are different in some respects from SCT and LDP category units because they can run at two different weights. The first locomotives were originally intended to be built as LDP010-LDP018 and leased to other railway operators, until Downer EDI and Pacific National reached an agreement to sell directly. TT130, TT131 and TT132 are owned by Pacific National.

Downer built nine locomotives, LDP001 to LDP009, for their subsidiary company, Locomotive Demand Power Pty Ltd, to lease them to other freight operators. In 2018, Pacific National acquired them. Repaints and reclassing of the LDP's into PN livery and to TTs commenced in 2022.

=== WH class ===
Three WH class locomotives were ordered by Whitehaven Coal. Operated by Pacific National, they are used to haul coal trains from Whitehaven's mines in the Gunnedah Basin.

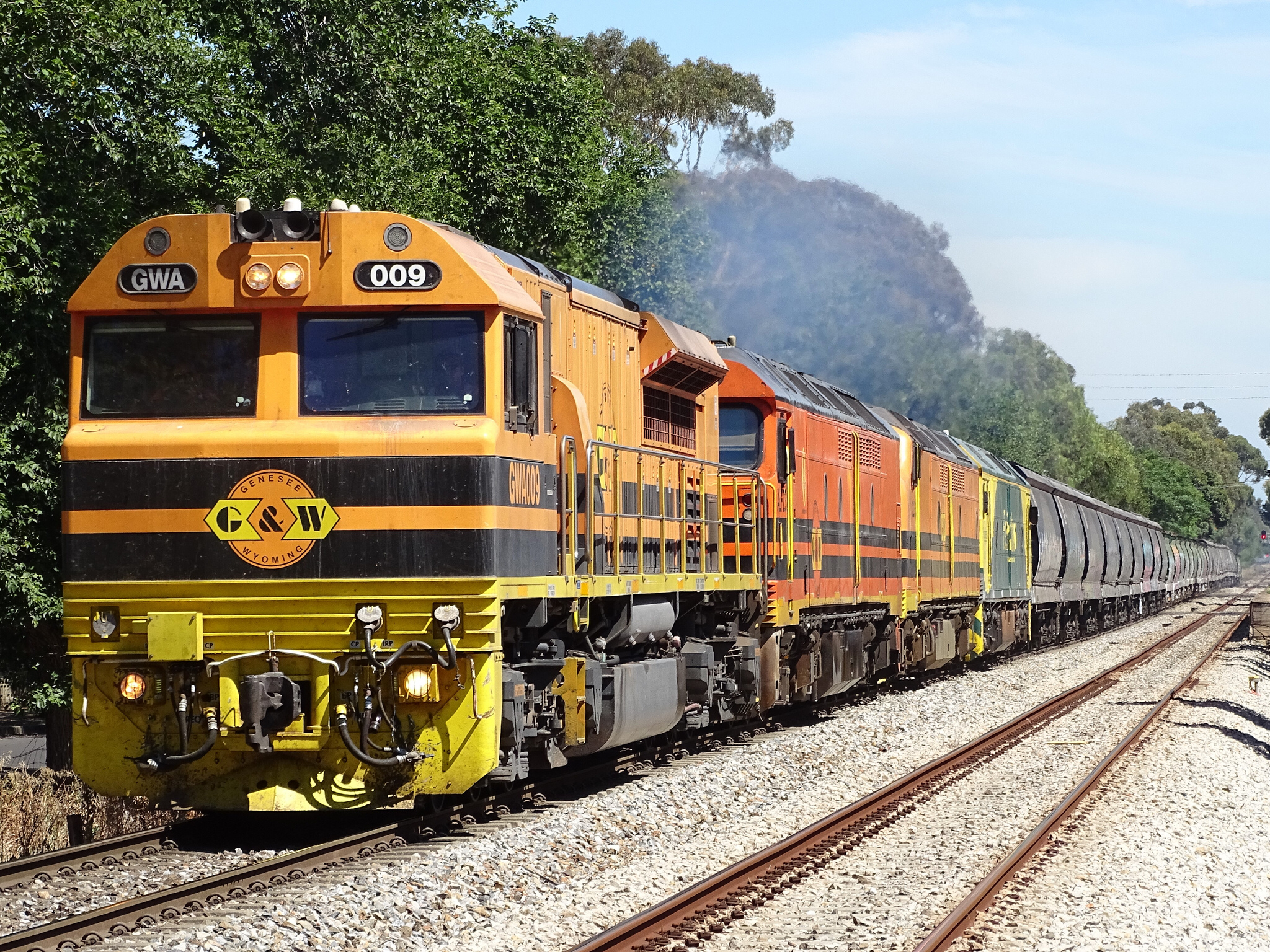
Locomotive GWA009 Genesee & Wyoming Australia grain train from Dry Creek North to Tailem Bend.

=== GWA and GWB classes ===
In 2011, Genesee & Wyoming Australia 10 Locomotives for the Adelaide–Darwin rail corridor. The locomotives were used on several grain services throughout South Australia.

The GWA class were accompanied by three newly commissioned GWB class (GT46C ACe Gen-II) locomotives (formerly known as EMD class) from storage in the United States. Numbered GWB101 to GWB103, they were deployed on intermodal, grain and ore traffic and were included in the sale of One Rail Australia assets to Aurizon in July 2022. A further three locomotives, numbered GWB104 to GWB106 were ordered by One Rail Australia Livery sale to Aurizon took place. These locomotives arrived on Australian shores on 24 January 2023, and entered service in March of the same year.

On 14 June 2023, GWA003 and ALF21 collided with a truck near Katherine and subsequently caught fire. GWA003 and ALF21 were destroyed and subsequently scrapped.

=== SSR class ===
The first two class members were originally built as LDP013 and LDP014 in 2013, they were then purchased by Southern Shorthaul Railroad in 2014 to operate on their Weston Milling grain service. Southern Shorthaul Railroad ordered two GT46C ACe Gen-II locomotives in 2023, they entered service in early 2024.

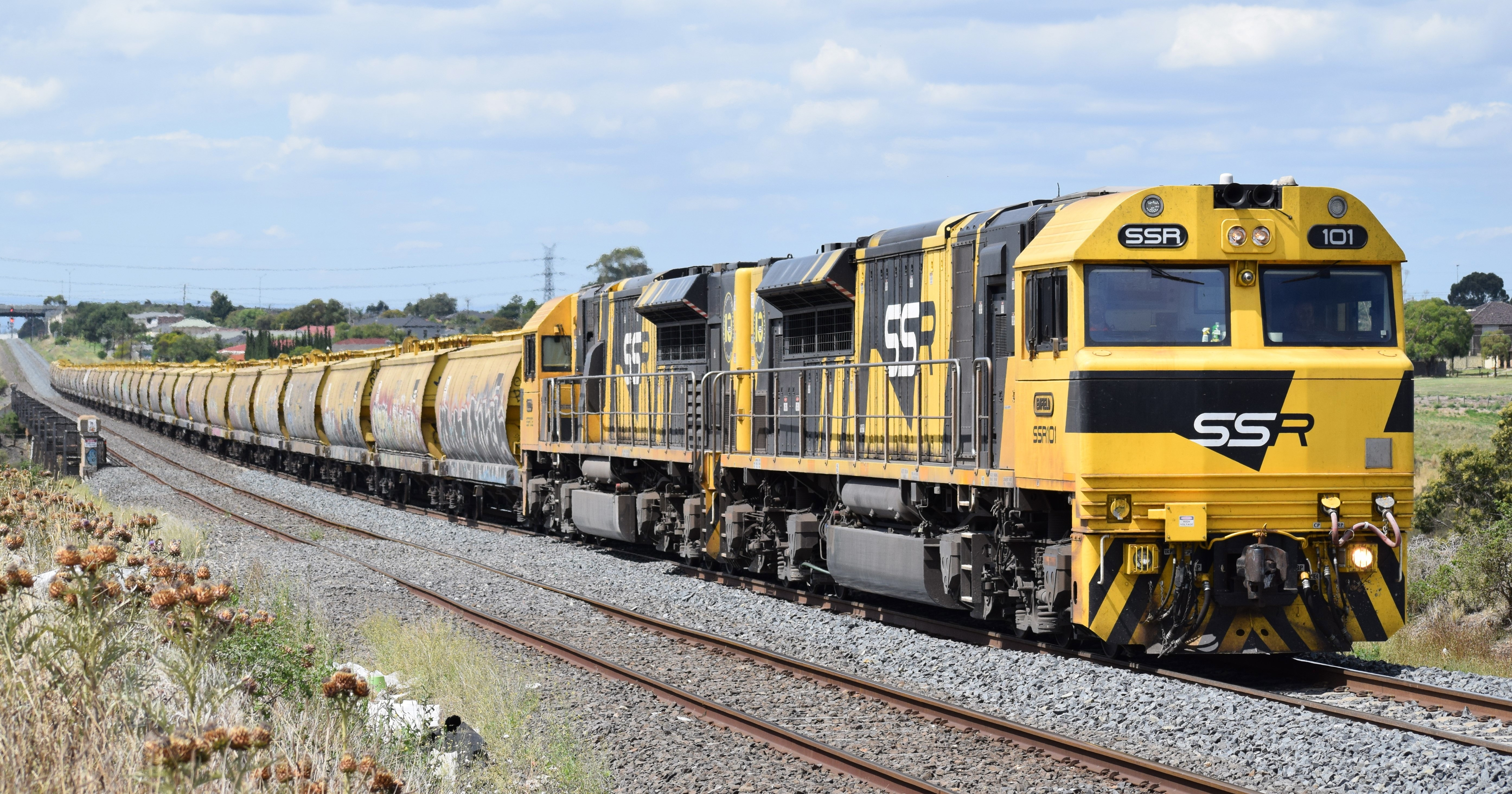
SSR101 and SSR102 run a grain from Ardlethan to Melbourne towards McIntyre Loop.

=== QE Class ===
In 2022, Qube Holdings announced that it had placed an order for 12 units to be built in the US. All 12 units entered service in 2024.

=== CBH 300 Class ===
In December 2022, CBH Group announced that it had ordered seven locomotives from Progress Rail to be delivered by November 2024 to bolster their standard-gauge locomotive fleet. After being delayed by nearly two years, the first four locomotives arrived on 30 September 2026. They will be operated by Aurizon under the existing service agreement.

=== MAN Class ===
In April 2023, it was announced that Manildra Group had ordered 17 locomotives from Progress Rail. In an agreement similar to CBH Group's contract with Aurizon, beginning from 1 November 2024, Southern Shorthaul Railroad will provide train crews and oversee daily operation of Manildra owned locomotives and wagons. This replaces Manildra Group's existing agreement with Pacific National, who provided their own rolling stock to service Manildra Group's requirements. The first 12 locomotives were delivered from the US beginning in 2024, however delays in production saw the remaining 5 units not delivered until late in 2025, with the resulting shortfall in motive power being made up with leased Railfirst and Aurizon locomotives (specifically the CM, CF, and ACC classes) with the hire cost born by Progress Rail.

The first two MAN class locomotives, MAN001 AND MAN002 entered service with nameplates reading "LEN" and "SIMMO" respectively, in the style of the nameplates affixed to SSR's GT46ACe-II locomotives, whilst others entered service with their road numbers only. More recently, most later members of the class have had the same type of nameplates fitted, bearing the names of various members of the Honan family, however some members of the class remain unnamed.

MAN013 "Pecka" was involved in a shunting accident in early 2026 which resulted in damage to the #2 end pilot, railings step, and walkway. The locomotive has since returned to service with the damaged step removed, the walkway, railing and pilot repaired, and a handrail welded in position where the steps were removed.

== Fleet ==
| Owner | Class | Number in class | Road numbers | Built | Notes |
| SCT Logistics | SCT | 15 | SCT001–SCT015 | 2007–08 | |
| Pacific National | TT, LDP | 53 | LDP001–LDP009 TT01–TT08, TT101–TT132, TT201-206 | 2009–13 | TT02 named Darrell Sherry. TT201-206 ex QE007-12. |
| Whitehaven Coal | WH Class | 3 | WH001–WH003 | 2011 | Operated by Pacific National. |
| Aurizon | GWA; GWB | 16 | GWA001–GWA010, GWB101–GWB106 | 2011-2023 | GWA001 named Phillip J. Ringo, and GWA002 named Richard H. Allert. GWA003 scrapped due to accident damage. GWA006 in Aurizon Bulk livery. |
| Southern Shorthaul Railroad | SSR | 4 | SSR101-SSR104 | 2013-2024 | SSR101 & SSR102 are named Enfield and Bendigo, respectively. Ex LDP013 and LDP014. SSR103 and SSR104 are named after John Mackie and Ian Williams. |
| Qube Holdings | QE | 6 | QE001-QE006 | 2023-24 | QE007-012 now TT201-206. |
| CBH Group | 300 | 7 | 301-307 | 2026 | To be operated by Aurizon. |
| Manildra Group | MAN | 17 | MAN001-MAN017 | 2024-2025 | All locomotives are named: MAN001 - Len, MAN002 - Simmo, MAN003 - Taylah, MAN004 - Natalia, MAN005 - Laila, MAN006 - Lachlan, MAN007 - Aurelia, MAN008 - Valentina, MAN009 - John, MAN010 - Caroline, MAN011 - Samantha, MAN012 - Ros, MAN013 - Pecka, MAN014 - Nick, MAN015 - Mary, MAN016 - Maureen, MAN017 - Jack Operated by SSR |

== Related models ==
- Downer EDI Rail/EMD 90 Class, Original model
- Downer EDI Rail GT46C, ancestor model
- Downer EDI Rail GT42CU AC, narrow gauge variant
- Downer EDI Rail GT42CU ACe, narrow gauge variant
- UGL Rail C44aci, principal competitor
