= CSR Qishuyan SDA2 =

Class of Australian diesel-electric locomotives

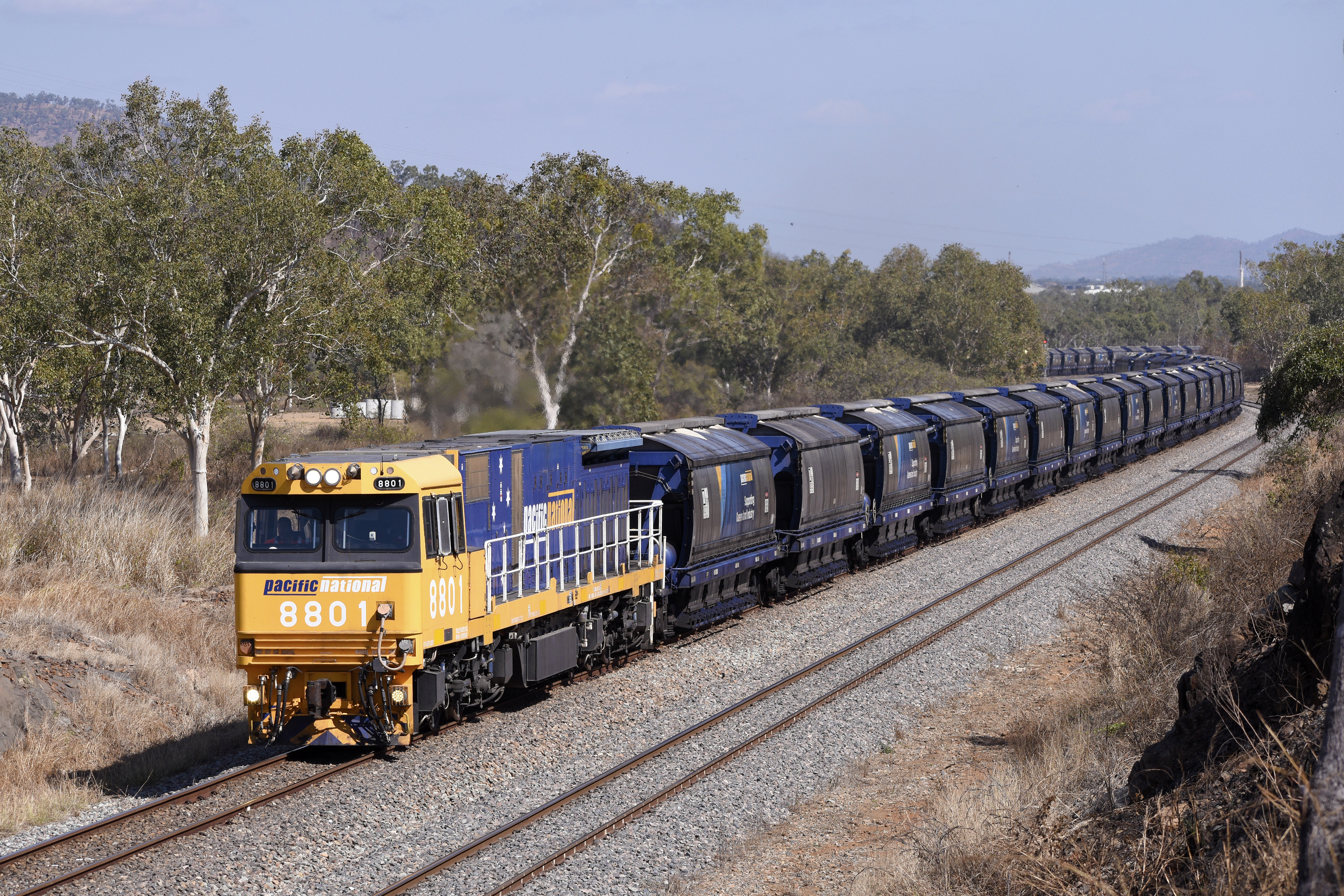
- Pacific National 8803
Type and origin
- Power type: Diesel-electric
- Builder: CRRC Qishuyan
- Model: SDA2
- Build date: 2014
- Total produced: 5
Specifications
- Configuration
  - UIC: Co-Co
- Gauge: 1,067 mm (3 ft 6 in)
- Length: 22.0 metres
- Width: 2.89 metres
- Height: 3.87 metres
- Axle load: 20 tonnes
- Loco weight: 120 tonnes
- Fuel type: Diesel
- Prime mover: MTU Friedrichshafen 20V4000R43
- Alternator: ABB
- Traction motors: ABB
- Head end power: Not Fitted
- Cylinders: V20
- MU working: DPU Slave
Performance figures
- Maximum speed: 100 km/h (62 mph)
- Tractive effort: 450 kN (100,000 lbf)
Career
- Operators: Pacific National
- Class: 88
- Number in class: 5
- Numbers: 8801-8805
- Nicknames: Dragons
- Delivered: 2014
- First run: 2014
- Current owner: Pacific National
- Disposition: 5 in service

The CSR Qishuyan SDA2 is a diesel-electric locomotive manufactured by CRRC Qishuyan, in association with MTU Friedrichshafen for use in Australia.

== History ==
In 2013, Pacific National ordered five narrow gauge versions of the CSR Ziyang SDA1 locomotives. Classified as the SDA2 class, they were purchased for use on the 1,067 mm (3 ft 6 in) network in Queensland.

All had been delivered by September 2014 and were undergoing trials on the Goonyella Coalfields being based at Nebo. They entered service in February 2015.

The nickname "Dragon" derived from a proposed livery having a golden dragon on the hoods of the locomotives.

In 2017 Pacific National won the contract to haul raw sugar to the Port of Townsville for export by Wilmar's Burdekin Sugar mills and the haulage of Proserpine mills product to the Port of Mackay. In the first year, 83 Class locomotives (GT42CU ACe) hauled electronically controlled pneumatic brakes fitted RGWY tandem hopper wagons and (upon request by the sugar mill) RNWY container flats with ex-Aurizon AMLU molasses tank containers. Ironically the slogan wrapped on one of the lead or slave wagons "Supporting Queensland Industry" contradicts itself, Pacific National's sugar fleet was manufactured in China. Due to the increased demand of locomotives required by PN, rumours spread of the spasmodically used 88 Class being sent to Townsville to haul 3 sets of RGWY hoppers for the Burdekin Sugar Mills. On 23 March 2019, 8804 arrived at PN's Toll North depot in vehicle on 82P9; Moolabin to Townsville Intermodal. The remainder of the class arrived at later dates and work commenced to ready them for testing by the 2019 crush. On the 28 July 2019, 8805 was the first locomotive to pass preliminary testing and was trialled on service 8Q84. Trialling continued on all members of the class with issues concerning communication between the locomotives and telemetry systems for loading and unloading of wagons. Toward the end of August it was expected an 88 class would usually lead a raw sugar train.

After the 2019 sugar season ended, Pacific National began trialling the fleet in their Intermodal Division, having 15 locomotives rostered with little to none to spare. Initially being downgraded to shunting duties in the Townsville region and later Gladstone. Townsville saw the fleet being used on the Toll North to the Port of Townsville cement shunts, often double heading. On one occasion an 88 lead 8CP1 from Townsville to Cairns. With minimal locomotive diversity in the Pacific National fleet, crews did not favour the locomotives over GT42s, resulting in four units being stored in Toll North, while the fifth unit operated as a shunting loco in Gladstone, awaiting the start of the next sugar season.

The 2020 season saw the class start what they left off the previous year, this time operating test sugar trains for the Burdekin mills that commenced on 5 June 2020 prior to the start of the crush. Respectively Inkerman Mill in Home Hill on 8 June 2020 and the remainder on 9 June 2020.

== Summary ==
Owner	Class	Number in class	Road numbers	Built	Notes
Pacific National	88	5	8801–8805	2014	
