= CSR Ziyang SDA1 =

High-powered diesel-electric locomotive

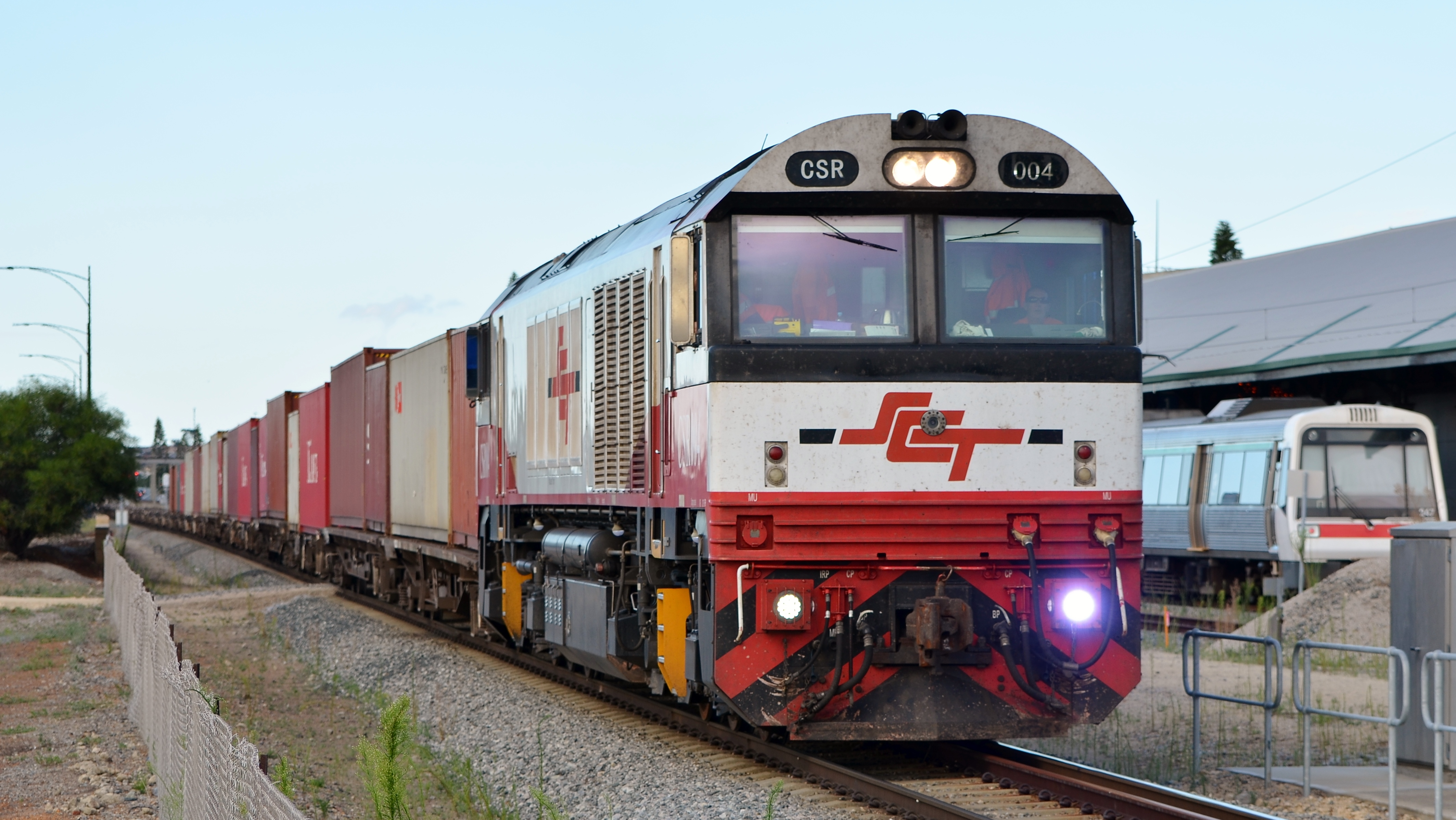
- CSR004 at North Quay, WA, 2015
Type and origin
- Power type: Diesel-electric
- Builder: CRRC Ziyang
- Model: CSR Ziyang SDA1
- Build date: 2012-2022
- Total produced: 30
Specifications
- Configuration
  - UIC: Co-Co
- Gauge: 1,435 mm (4 ft 8 1/2 in)
- Length: 21.1 m (69 ft)
- Width: 2.9 m (9 ft 6 in)
- Height: 4.24 m (13.9 ft)
- Loco weight: 134 t (132 long tons; 148 short tons)
- Fuel type: Diesel
- Prime mover: MTU Friedrichshafen 20V4000R43L
- Engine type: Diesel
- Aspiration: Turbochargers
- Cylinders: V20
- Transmission: Electric
- MU working: Equipped
- Loco brake: Air, Dynamic
- Train brakes: Air
- Safety systems: Deadman Switch
Performance figures
- Maximum speed: 115 km/h (71 mph)
- Power output: 3,150 kW (4,220 hp)
- Tractive effort: 520 kN (120,000 lbf)
Career
- Operators: SCT Logistics; Qube Logistics
- Class: CSR class (SCT), QBX class (QUBE)
- Number in class: 30
- Numbers: CSR001-CSR024; QBX001-QBX006
- Nicknames: Pandaroo, Sugar Cubes, Rice Burners
- Delivered: 2012
- First run: 2012
- Current owner: SCT Logistics; Qube Logistics
- Disposition: all in service

The CSR Ziyang SDA1 is a high-powered diesel-electric locomotive manufactured by CRRC Ziyang, China in association with MTU Friedrichshafen, for use in Australia.

== History and design ==
In September 2010, CRRC Ziyang won a 100 million yuan order to supply SCT Logistics with six locomotives for use on transcontinental trains in Australia. This was the first export of a Chinese-built locomotive to Australia. Four more locomotives were ordered in March 2011. The first locomotive was unveiled on 22 July 2011 at Ziyang.

Initial specifications for the locomotives (manufacturer's code SDA1) were for a 120 km/h (75 mph) dual cab, Co-Co locomotive, with a mass of 134 t (132 long tons; 148 short tons), powered by a MTU Friedrichshafen 20V4000R43L engine, with AC traction controlled by IGBT based converters (sourced from Zhuzhou CRRC Times Electric), and a Wabtec braking system.

Testing started in early 2012, which included hauling a large iron ore train at up to 130 km/h (81 mph) between Port Augusta and Adelaide. The locomotives passed their introductory tests on 5 March 2012, allowing operations on mainline routes in Australia to commence. On 16 March 2012 two locomotives successfully hauled a 8,080 t (7,950 long tons; 8,910 short tons) train on a 1% grade, completing SCT's tests.

Bradken ordered two locomotives in December 2011 for haulage of iron ore. The order was later increased to four. After a period of storage at East Greta, they were then moved to Broadmeadow yard to be used on Qube Logistics container trains from Sandgate to Port Botany with the 1100s. Both were sold to SCT Logistics in January 2017.

Qube Logistics ordered six in January 2013 as the QBX class with all delivered in March 2015.

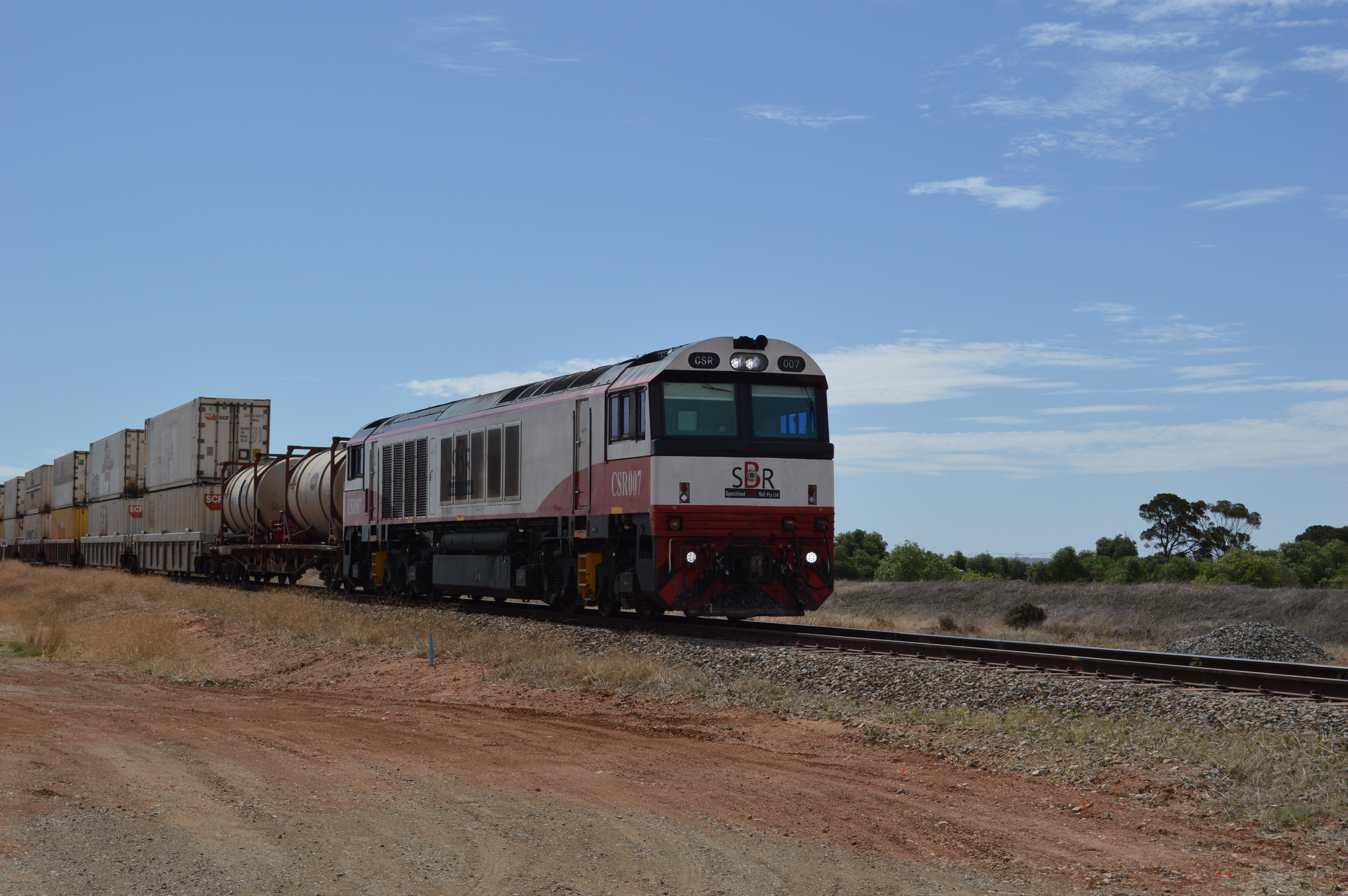
SCT Logistics locomotive at Bowmans in March 2020

In October 2013, the entire fleet was withdrawn from service and quarantined, after white asbestos was found in the engine area. This is despite the locomotives being certified as asbestos free. By January 2014, remediation work had been carried out and most of the class was already back in service.

In mid 2021 SCT Logistics ordered 12 more SDA1s from CRRC Ziyang with the first two being delivered in July and two more in December.

== Summary ==
Owner	Class	Image	Number in class	Road numbers	Built
SCT Logistics	CSR		24	CSR001-CSR024	2012-2022
Qube Logistics	QBX		6	QBX001-QBX006	2014-2015

== See also ==
- CSR Qishuyan SDA2, Cape gauge single cab variant
