= WAGR Q class (1895) =

Class of Australian 4-6-2T locomotives

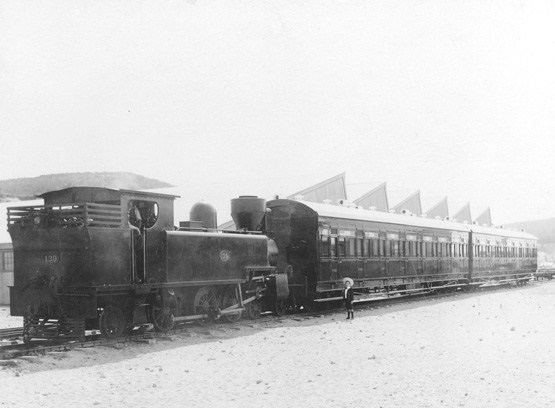
- Q139 with a train of new suburban carriages at Rocky Bay (North Fremantle), 1905
Type and origin
- Power type: Steam
- Builder: R&W Hawthorn Leslie & Co
- Total produced: 6
- Rebuilder: Midland Railway Workshops
- Rebuild date: 1905, 1909
- Number rebuilt: 4 as Qa class
Specifications
- Configuration
  - Whyte: 4-6-2T
- Gauge: 3 ft 6 in (1,067 mm)
- Length: Q: 34 ft 1 in (10.39 m); Qa: 35 ft 2 in (10.72 m)
- Loco weight: Q: 41 long tons 0 cwt (91,800 lb or 41.7 t); Qa: 52 long tons 0 cwt (116,500 lb or 52.8 t)
- Fuel type: Coal
- Fuel capacity: Q: 2.5 long tons 0 cwt (5,600 lb or 2.5 t); Qa: 3 long tons 0 cwt (6,700 lb or 3 t)
- Water cap.: Q: 1,200 imp gal (5,500 L; 1,400 US gal); Qa: 1,600 imp gal (7,300 L; 1,900 US gal)
- Firebox
  - Grate area: Q: 14 sq ft (1.3 m^{2}); Qa: 17 sq ft (1.6 m^{2})
- Boiler pressure: Q: 160 lbf/in^{2} (1.10 MPa); Qa: 175 lbf/in^{2} (1.21 MPa)
Performance figures
- Tractive effort: Q: 14,908 lbf (66.31 kN); Qa: 16,306 lbf (72.53 kN)
- Factor of adh.: Q: 3.9, Qa: 4.3
Career
- Operators: Western Australian Government Railways
- Numbers: Q138-Q143
- First run: 19 August 1896
- Withdrawn: 31 March 1925
- Disposition: All scrapped

The WAGR Q class was a six-member class of 4-6-2T tank engine steam locomotives operated by the Western Australian Government Railways (WAGR) between 1896 and 1925.

== History ==
In April 1896, the WAGR placed an order with R&W Hawthorn Leslie & Co for four 4-6-2T locomotives. Meanwhile, the builder had two very similar locomotives that had been built in 1895 for the Portos e Caminhos de Ferro de Moçambique, Mozambique as part of a cancelled order. The WAGR purchased them and they entered service in August 1896. The other four entered service in 1896/97. The 1895 built locomotives had different shaped cab windows and side tanks.

They were employed as shunters at Fremantle and Midland. In 1905, Q140 was rebuilt with a new boiler and converted to 4-6-4T configuration with water and coal capacity increased to make it suitable to operate on the Upper Darling Range railway, Q141-Q143 followed in 1909. They were reclassified as the Qa class.

They operated branch line services on the Mundaring, Mundaring Weir, Pinjarra-Holyoake and Upper Darling Range lines as well as on the Eastern Railway to Northam and South Western Railway to Bunbury. All were withdrawn in 1924/25.

== Class list ==
The numbers and periods in service of each member of the Q class were as follows:

Builder's number	Road number	In service	Rebuilt as Qa	Withdrawn
2312	138	19 August 1896		31 January 1924
2313	139	19 August 1896		31 January 1924
2351	140	5 December 1896	30 September 1905	31 January 1924
2352	141	20 January 1897	13 March 1909	31 March 1925
2353	142	13 March 1897	29 May 1909	31 March 1925
2354	143	13 March 1897	30 June 1909	31 January 1924

== Namesakes ==
The Q class designation was reused for the Q class locomotives that were introduced in 1931. It was reused in the 1990s when the Westrail Q class diesel locomotives entered service.

== See also ==
- Rail transport in Western Australia
- List of Western Australian locomotive classes
