= WAGR Q class =

Class of Australian 4-6-0 locomotives

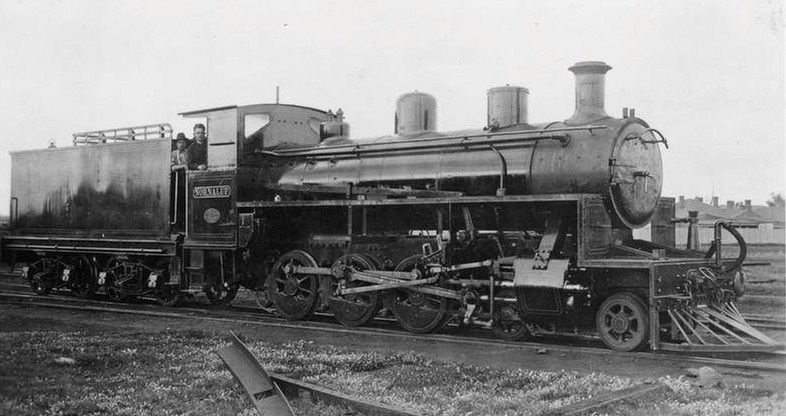
- PWD locomotive Nornalup (later Q63), ca 1928
Type and origin
- Power type: Steam
- Builder: Andrew Barclay Sons & Co.
- Total produced: 2
Specifications
- Configuration
  - Whyte: 4-6-0
- Gauge: 3 ft 6 in (1,067 mm)
- Length: 49 ft 3 in (15.01 m)
- Total weight: 119 long tons 6 cwt (267,200 lb or 121.2 t)
- Fuel type: Coal
- Fuel capacity: 5.5 long tons 0 cwt (12,300 lb or 5.6 t)
- Water cap.: 2,050 imp gal (9,300 L; 2,460 US gal)
- Firebox
  - Grate area: 17 sq ft (1.6 m^{2})
- Boiler pressure: 165 lbf/in^{2} (1.14 MPa)
- Valve gear: Walschaerts
Performance figures
- Tractive effort: 14,060 lbf (62.54 kN)
- Factor of adh.: 4.2
Career
- Operators: Public Works Department; Western Australian Government Railways
- First run: 31 July 1928
- Withdrawn: 9 October 1953
- Disposition: both scrapped

The WAGR Q class was a two-member class of 4-6-0 steam locomotives operated by the Public Works Department (PWD) and later Western Australian Government Railways (WAGR) between 1928 and 1953.

== History ==
In November 1927, the PWD's Railway Construction Branch awarded a tender to Andrew Barclay Sons & Co., Kilmarnock for two 4-6-0 locomotives.

Both locomotives entered service with the PWD on 31 July 1928 named Wiluna and Nornalup after contemporary construction projects. On 5 January 1931, responsibility for the Railway Construction Branch of the PWD was transferred to the WAGR, with both included and numbered Q62 and Q63. They were withdrawn on 25 October 1949 and 9 October 1953 respectively and scrapped.

== Namesakes ==
The Q class designation was previously used for the Q class locomotives that were withdrawn in 1925. It was reused in the 1990s when the Westrail Q class diesel locomotives entered service.

== See also ==
- Rail transport in Western Australia
- List of Western Australian locomotive classes
