= Downer EDI Rail GT42CU ACe =

Class of Australian diesel-electric locomotive

GT42CU ACe
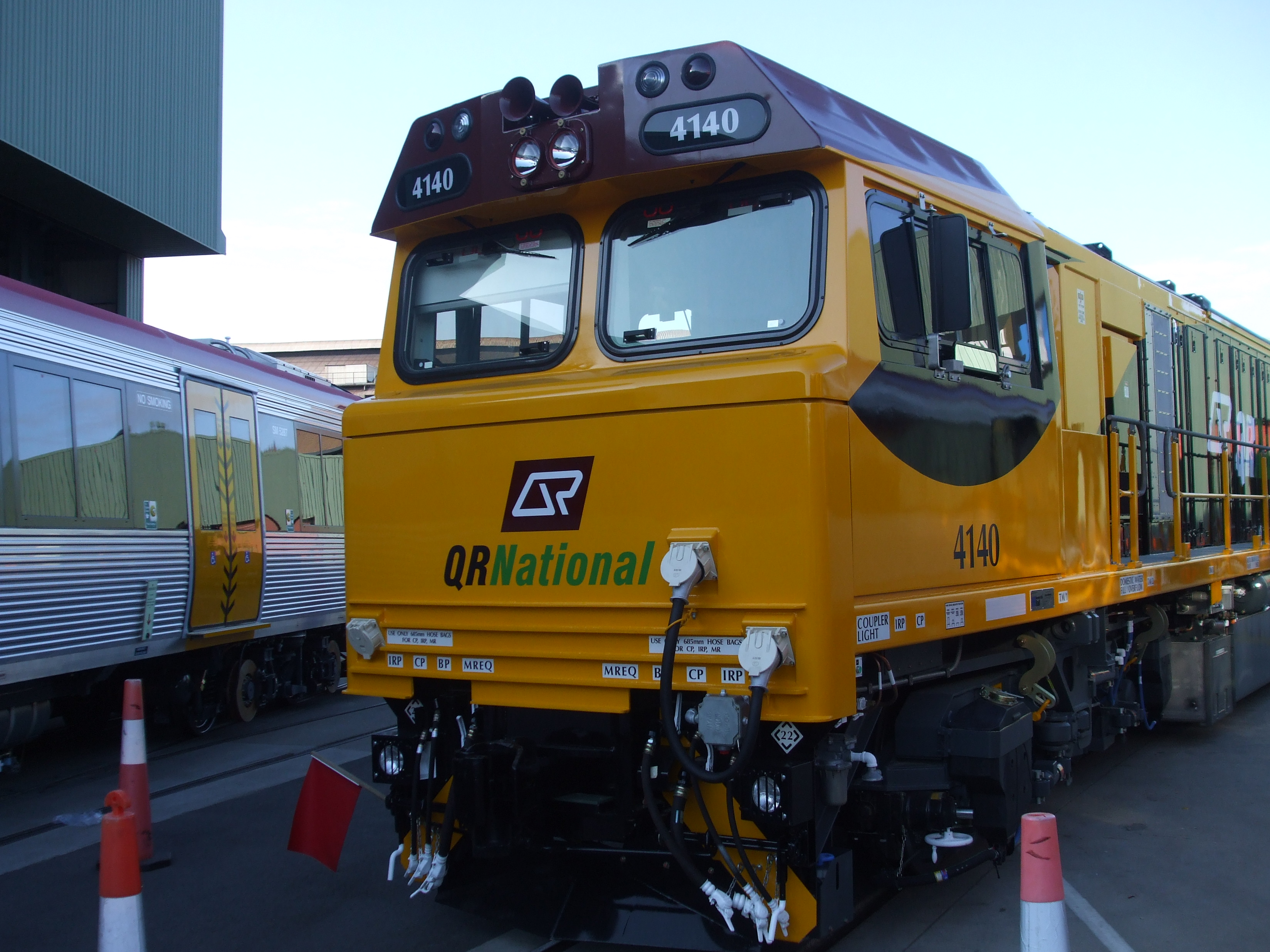
- Aurizon 4140 at Downer Rail, Maryborough in September 2010
Type and origin
- Power type: Diesel-electric
- Builder: Downer Rail, Maryborough
- Model: Electro-Motive Diesel GT42CU ACe
- Build date: 2007–2013
- Total produced: 132
Specifications
- Configuration
  - UIC: Co'Co'
- Gauge: 1,067 mm (3 ft 6 in)
- Length: 22.0 m (72 ft 2 in)
- Loco weight: 120 t (120 long tons; 130 short tons)
- Fuel type: Diesel
- Prime mover: EMD 12N-710G3B-ES
- Engine type: V12 Diesel engine
- Alternator: EMD TA12-QBE/CA7C
- Traction motors: EMD A2916-8
- Cylinders: 12
- Cylinder size: 11.63 L (710 cu in)
- Loco brake: Dynamic
- Train brakes: NYAB/Knorr-Bremse CCB II
Performance figures
- Maximum speed: 100 km/h (62 mph)
- Power output: 2,460 kW (3,300 hp)
Career
- Operators: Aurizon; East Coast Rail; Pacific National
- Number in class: 132
- Numbers: 4101–4140, 4153–4167; ACN4141–ACN4152, ACN4168–ACN4175; 8301–8352; GWN001–GWN005; ORQ026; PRQ001
- Delivered: 2007
- First run: 2007
- Last run: 2013
- Disposition: 132 in service

The GT42CU ACe is a model of diesel electric locomotives manufactured by EDi Rail, Maryborough between 2007 and 2013 under licence from Electro-Motive Diesel, for use on narrow gauge railways in Queensland, South Australia and Western Australia.

== History ==
The GT42CU ACe is an evolution of the GT42CU AC being fitted with a different computer system and traction motors.

In 2006, Queensland Rail placed an initial order for 15, with a further orders increasing the number to 75. These were designated as the 4100 class. Following Queensland Rail purchasing Australian Railroad Group in June 2006, 19 were transferred to Western Australia and reclassified as the ACN class, but retain their original numbers.

The Queensland based units are primarily used on the Blackwater, Moura and Newlands coal networks, and on phosphate trains between Mount Isa and Townsville. The Western Australian-based units are primarily engaged hauling iron ore trains. All were included in the transfer of Queensland Rail's freight business to QR National in July 2010.

Pacific National placed an order for 13 units for coal haulage on the Blackwater system that later grew to 46. These were designated as the 83 class.

In July 2012, One Rail Australia placed an order for five for use in South Australia. Designated the GWN class, they operated on the Arrium iron ore railway to Whyalla Steelworks. They were transferred to Queensland after being displaced by 5 Queensland Railways 2250 class locomotives returning to Australia from South Africa.

A further six were built as a speculative order for Locomotive Demand Power as the LDP class. One was painted in Pacific National livery and numbered 8347 in anticipation of a lease that failed to eventuate, the others were numbered LDP016-LDP020 with all six placed in store in Maryborough. All were included in the sale of Downer Rail's locomotive business to Progress Rail Services and in December 2017, were moved to Redbank Railway Workshops entering service as 8347–8352 with Pacific National in April and May 2018.

== Fleet ==
| Operator | Class | Number in class | Road numbers | Built | Notes |
| Aurizon | 4100 | 54 | 4101–4140, 4153–4167 | 2007–2011 | Used in Queensland |
| Aurizon | ACN | 21 | ACN4141–ACN4152, ACN4168–ACN4175 | 2011–2012 | Used in Western Australia |
| One Rail | GWN | 5 | GWN001–GWN005 | 2012 | Transferred to QLD during 2019–2020 for Coal workings |
| One Rail | ORQ | 1 | ORQ026 | Rebuild 2025 | Was 4026 |
| Pacific National | 83 | 52 | 8301–8352 | 2008–2013 | 8347–8352 built as speculative order in 2013, entered service with Pacific National 2018, 8317 Stowed (Collision) |
| Progress Rail | PRQ | 1 | PRQ001 | Rebuild 2025 | Was 4017 |

== Related Development ==
- UGL Rail C44aci
- Downer EDI Rail GT46C ACe
- Downer EDI Rail GT42CU AC
