= SCT Logistics =

Transport company in Australia

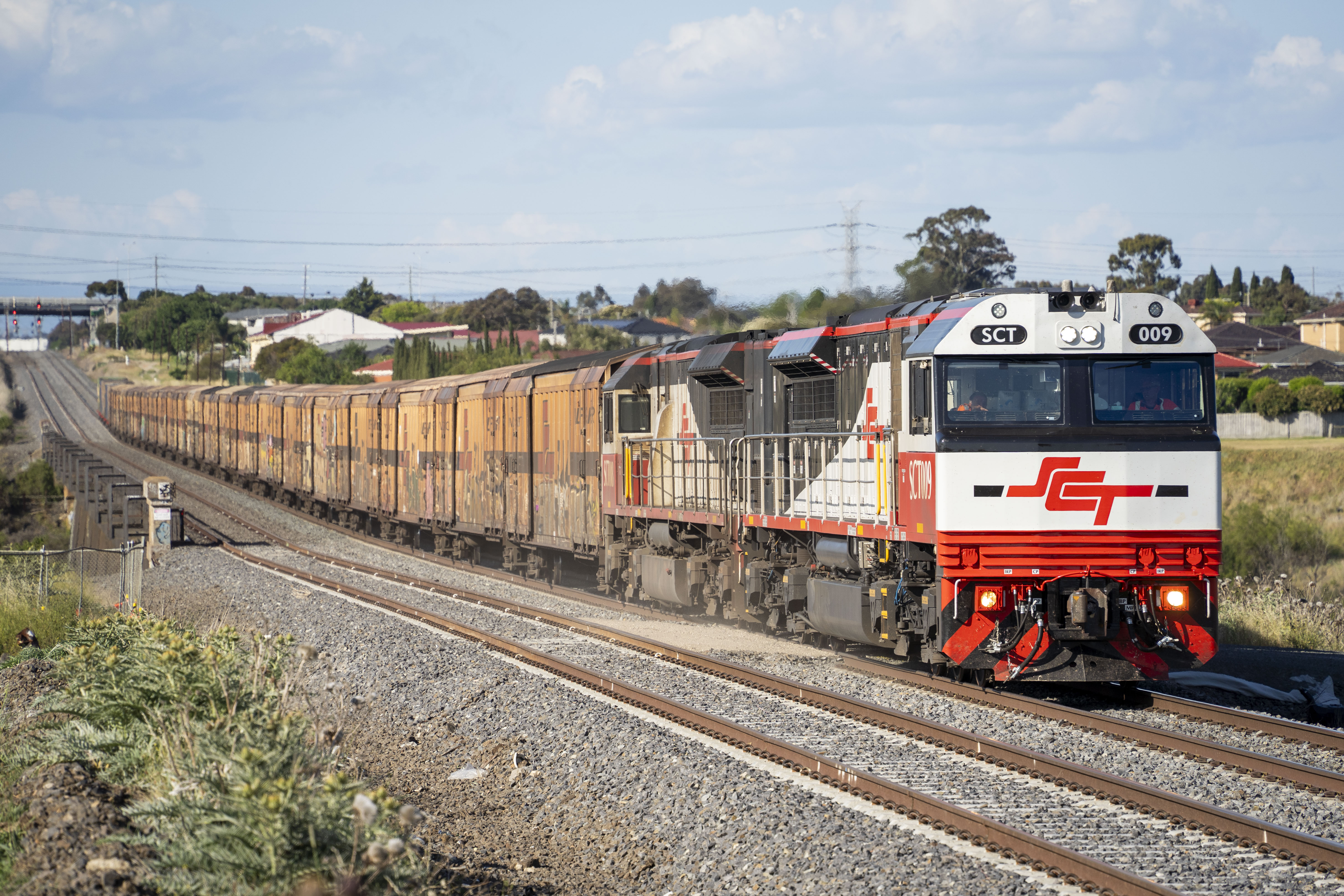
- SCT Logistics freight train passing through Sunshine North, Victoria in November 2023
- Formerly: Specilaised Container Transport
- Industry: Logistics
- Founded: 1974
- Founder: Peter Smith
- Headquarters: Altona, Australia
- Key people: Geoff Smith (Managing Director)
- Revenue: $390 million (2020)
- Owner: Smith family
- Number of employees: 2,000 (2020)
- Subsidiaries: Specialised Bulk Rail
- Website: www.sctlogistics.com.au

SCT Logistics is an Australian interstate transport company operating rail and road haulage, with facilities in Brisbane, Sydney, Parkes, Melbourne, Adelaide and Perth.

== History ==
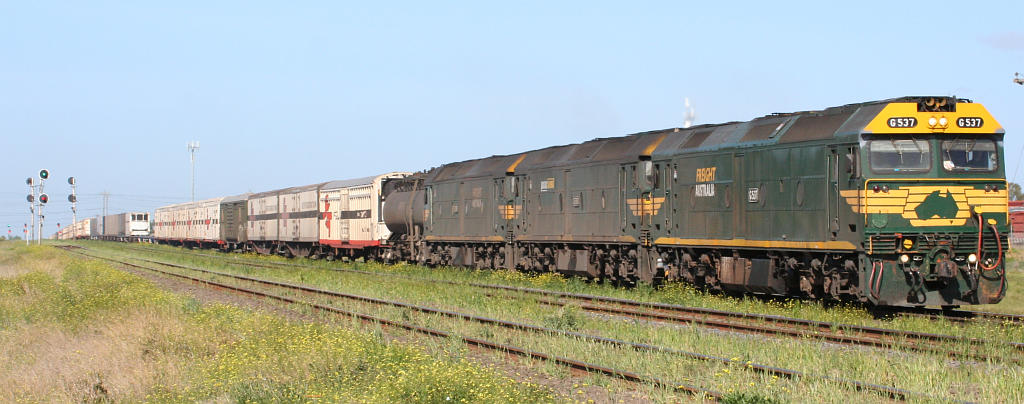
Freight Australia G class locomotives hauling a Melbourne bound service near Geelong in September 2006

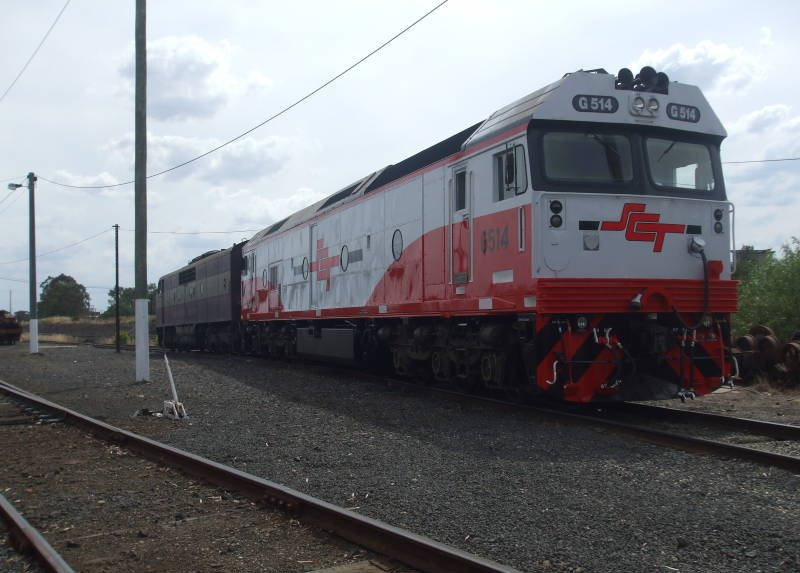
G class at Seymour in December 2007

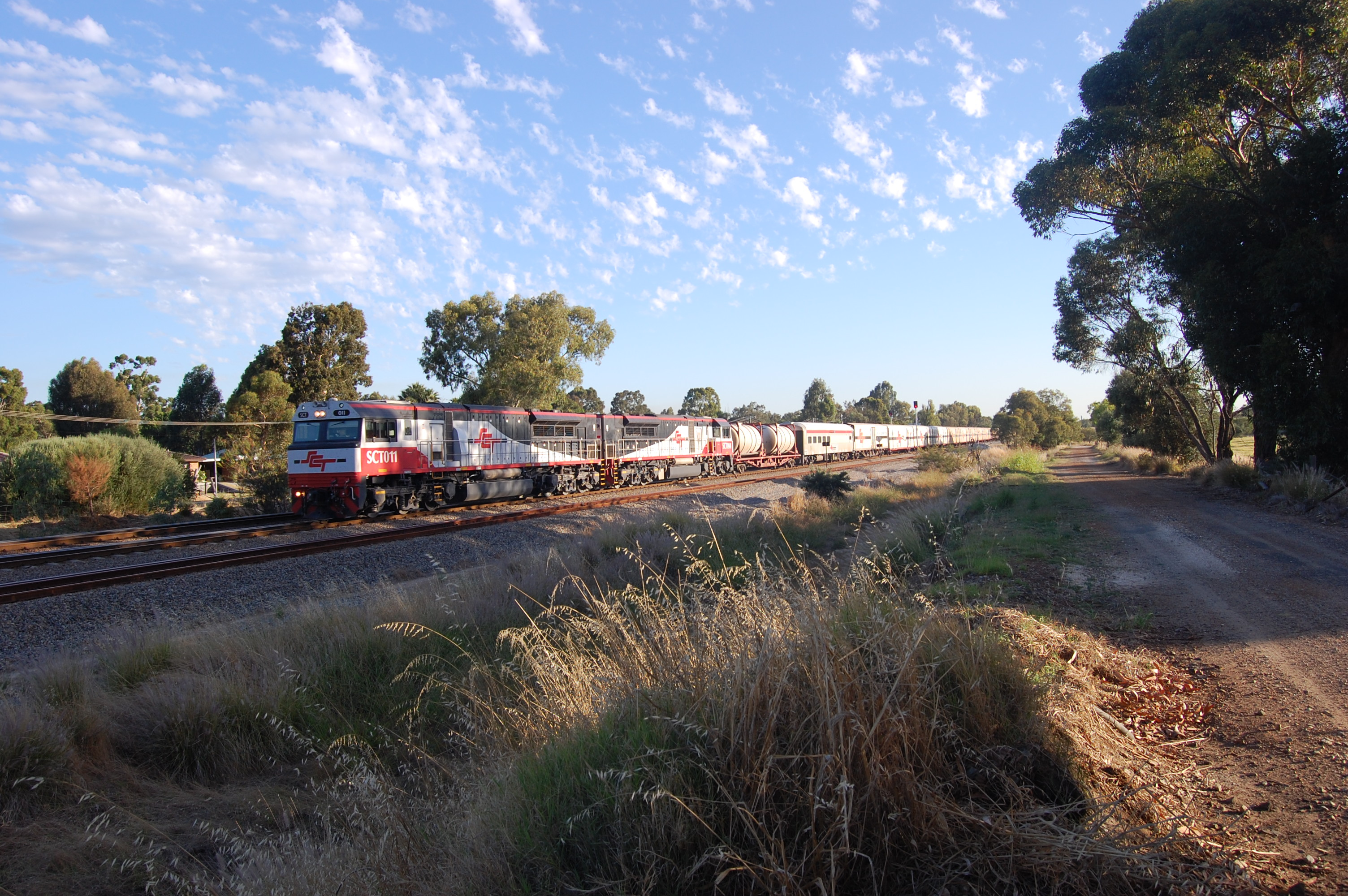
SCT class locomotives at Hazelmere in December 2008

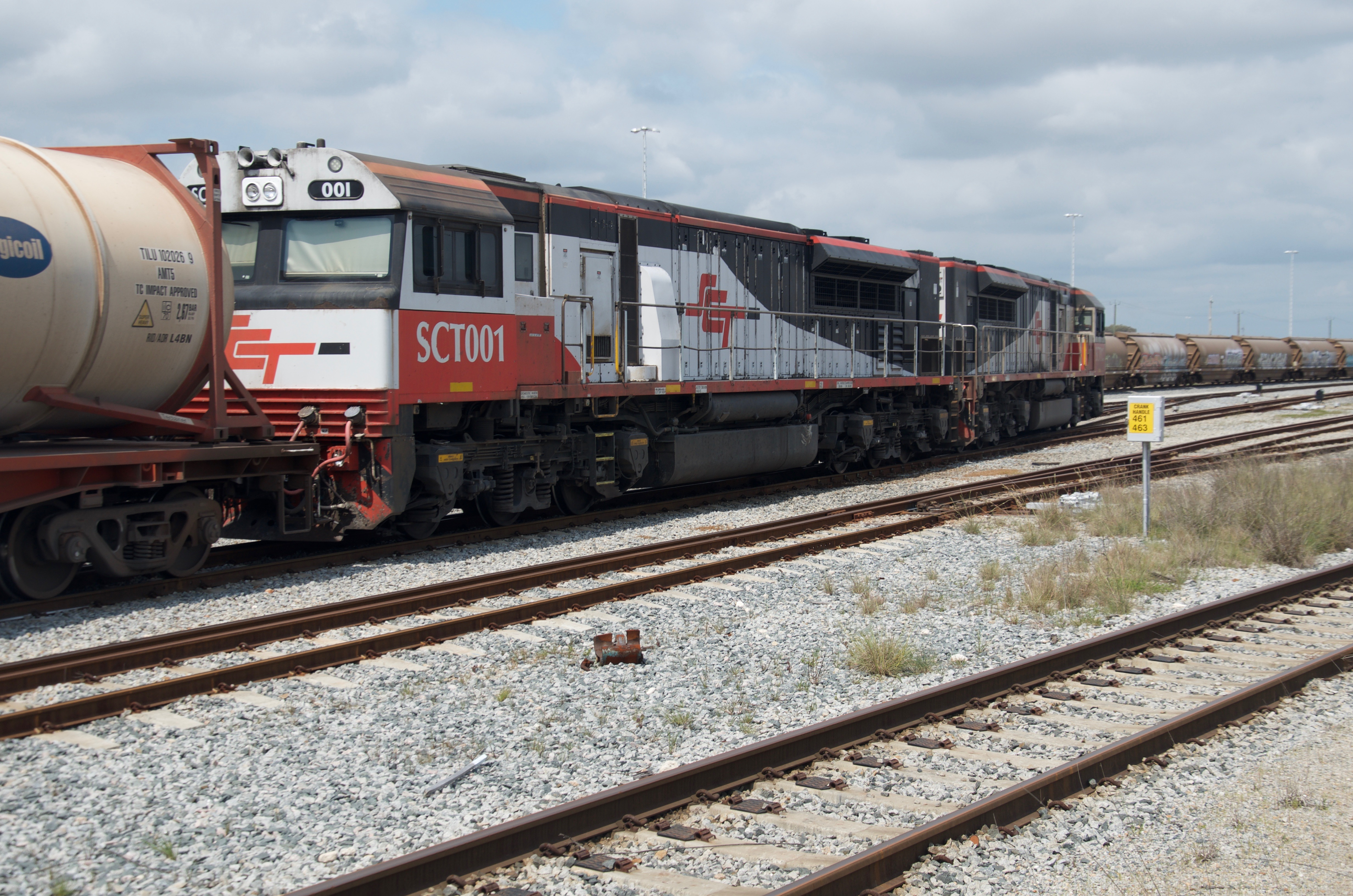
SCT 001 at Forrestfield in September 2018

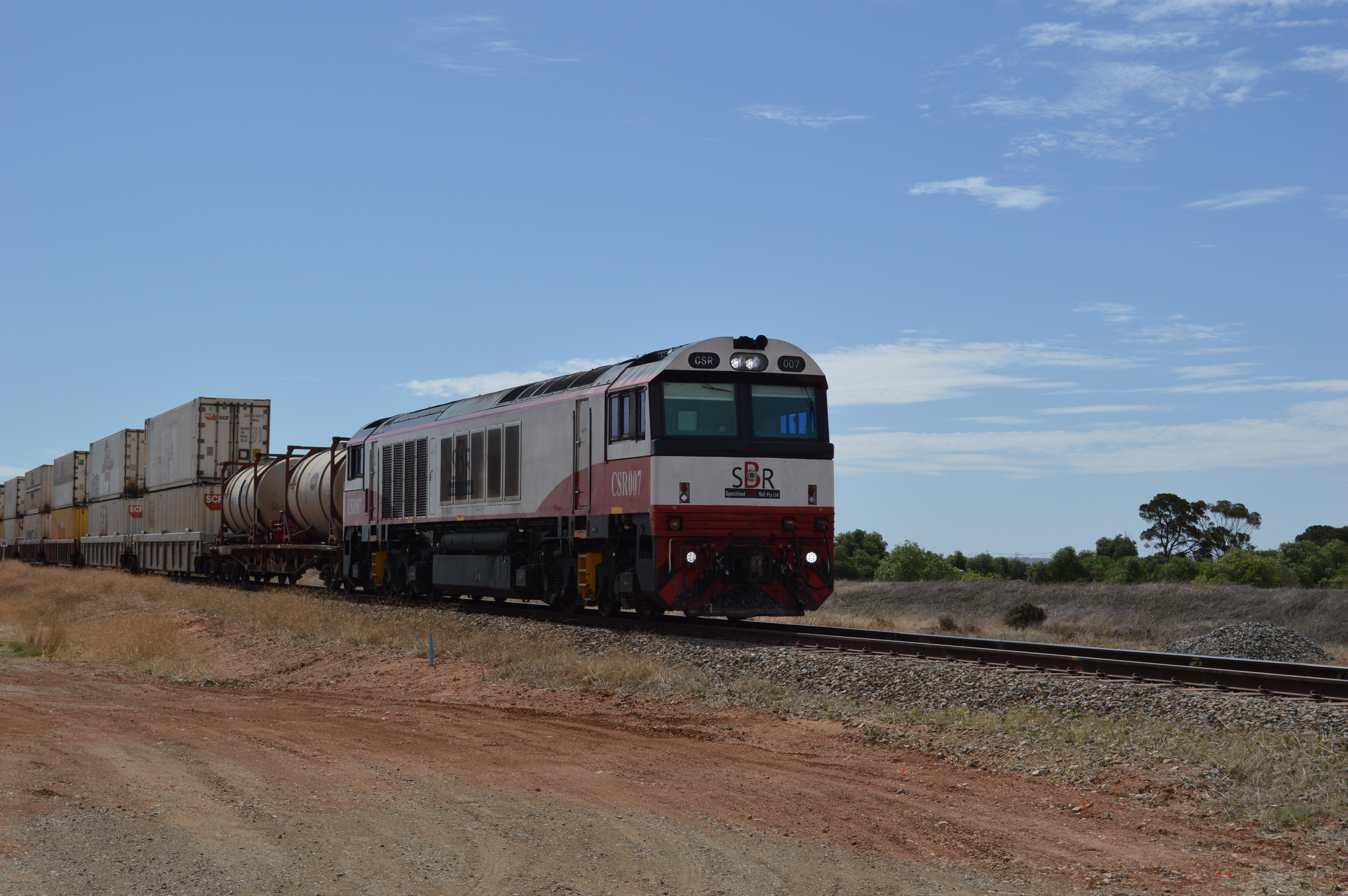
CSR Class locomotive at Bowmans in March 2020

SCT Logistics was founded in 1974 as Specialised Container Transport.

In the mid-1990s, National Rail decided to discontinue the use of refrigerated vans, louvred vans, and boxcars on its trains. At the same time, Australia's rail network was being opened up to enable private operators the use of publicly owned railway track.

SCT had a customer base who wished to retain their use, so a number of surplus covered wagons were acquired, and hook and pull agreements were agreed with V/Line Freight (Melbourne to Adelaide) and Australian National (Adelaide to Perth) to haul the trains. In July 1995, SCT began operating a weekly service from Melbourne to Perth. The initial terminals for the service were at Dynon in Melbourne, Keswick in Adelaide and Kewdale in Perth. These were later replaced by purpose-built facilities at Laverton North, Penfield and Forrestfield.

In October 2000, Freight Australia was awarded a contract to haul the services from Melbourne through to Perth with G class locomotives and specially equipped fuel tankers to replenish on the move. Crew vans were also introduced, for the accommodation of train crew on the long journey across the Nullarbor Plain. The company also owned and operated its own locomotives for shunting wagons in its terminals. In November 2006, SCT commenced running trains from a new terminal in Parkes, New South Wales to Perth.

In February 2007, SCT purchased nine G class locomotives and leased three NR class locomotives from Pacific National until SCT's own fleet of SCT locomotives were delivered. This was to comply with an undertaking given by Toll Holdings to the Australian Competition & Consumer Commission as part of it acquiring control of Pacific National.

In February 2010, SCT Logistics commenced operating services between Melbourne and Brisbane with its wagons included in Aurizon operated services.

In September 2010 Specialised Bulk Rail was formed as a subsidiary to haul iron ore from Cairn Hill Mine, Coober Pedy to Outer Harbor for IMX Resources. In June 2014, due to low iron ore prices, the Cairn Hill mine was closed, ceasing SBRs Iron Ore contract.

In January 2017, it began operating its own Melbourne to Brisbane services having opened a terminal in Bromelton.

In 2020, SCT Logistics was ranked 169th in the Australian Financial Review "Top 500 Private Companies in Australia", recording an annual revenue of AUD390 million, up 4% from the previous year. As of 2020, SCT employed approximately 2,000 people.

In January 2022, SCT Logistics commenced operating bulk trains of steel products from Melbourne to Adelaide and Perth under contract to BlueScope.

In February 2024, SCT Logistics hired Seymour Railway Heritage Centre locomotives C501 and X31 which were recently converted to Standard-gauge. These locomotives were hired for use on the Dooen Freight in western Victoria.

2026 will see SCT leasing 10 CF class locomotives from Rail First for a period of 12 months or possibly longer.

== locomotive fleet ==
Class	Image	Type	Gauge	Top speed (km/h)	Built	Number	Units	Notes
Owned Fleet
CSR class		Diesel-electric	Standard	115	2010-2022	24	CSR001 - CSR024	New build First Chinese-built Locomotives to operate in Australia
SCT class		Diesel-electric	Standard	115	2007-2008	15	SCT001 - SCT015	New build First locomotives built new for SCT Logistics
J class		Diesel-Electric	Standard	115	1966	2	J102, J103	J102 and J103 SCT Parkes shunters
T class		Diesel-electric	Standard	100	1955-1968	2	T345, T414	T345 stored Seymour T414 SCT Barnawartha shunter
X Class		Diesel-Electric	Standard	133	1975-1976	2	X47, X51	X47 and X51 SCT Forrestfield shunters
80 class		Diesel-Electric	Standard	130	1980	1	8026	SCT Altona shunter
Leased Fleet
CF class		Diesel-Electric	Standard	115	2011 - 2025	12	CF4402, CF4403, CF4408, CF4410, CF4428, CF4429, CF4430, CF4431, CF4432, CF4433, CF4438, CF4439	Leased from Rail First
Previous Fleet
G class		Diesel- Electric	Standard	115	1984 - 1989	9	G511 - G515, G521, G532, G533, G535	G511 to Watco, G512 + G515 to CFCLA, G513 + G514 to SSR, G521 + G532 to Qube, G533 + G535 to Aurizon
H class		Diesel-Electric	Standard	105	1964-1965	4	H1, H2, H3, H5	H2 and H3 preserved by Rail Heritage Western Australia H1 and H5 Scrapped, Forrestfield, August 2026
K class		Diesel-Electric	Standard	130	1966-1969	3	K201, K208, K209	K201 and K209 Scrapped, Dynon. August 2026 K208 scrapped, Forrestfield, August 2026
X200 class		Diesel-Electric	Standard	39	1963	3	X207, X209, X216	All scrapped, Altona, January 2026
RT class		Diesel-Mechanical	Standard	15	1962	1	RT32	Static Display, Mounted outside SCT Altona

== Queensland Intermodal Freight Hub ==
In August 2017, the company opened a new freight hub in Queensland, Bromelton Intermodal Estate. The opening was led by then-Deputy Prime Minister of Australia Barnaby Joyce and MP Scott Buchholz. The new freight hub is located adjacent to the Sydney–Brisbane rail corridor.

The project cost $35.2 million (AUD), with the Australian Federal Government investing $9.6 million (AUD) towards the cost of the terminal as a means to help provide local jobs in the area.

The 10 ha (25 acres) terminal has warehouses, loading facilities, and 6 km (3.7 mi) of track.

== Motorsport ==
2013-2019 V8 Supercars Sponsorship Alongside Supercheap Auto

In 2013, SCT announced its sponsorship plans with Supercheap Auto's Holden Commodore (VF), operated by Walkinshaw Racing Team. The #66 was driven by Russell Ingall, who finished the season 15th, with a 3rd-place finish at the Gold Coast 600.

From 2014 to 2015, SCT continued its sponsorship with the Supercheap Auto sponsored Holden Commodore (VF), Ingall was replaced by Tim Slade. Slade finished 17th with 3 podium finishes in 2014 and 13th with 1 podium in 2015.

In 2016, Supercheap Auto announced it would switch to Prodrive Racing Australia run under Rod Nash Racing with 2014 Bathurst 1000 winner Chaz Mostert behind the wheel. After a difficult season, Mostert managed to win a race at the Gold Coast 600.

In 2017 Mostert continued with Rod Nash Racing and won 3 races and the Pirtek Enduro Cup with co-driver Steve Owen after winning the Gold Coast 600. Mostert finished the championship in 5th position.

In 2018, another reshuffle of Prodrive Racing Australia saw them, and the Rod Nash Racing entry, renamed to Tickford Racing However, the team had a difficult season and Mostert only took one victory, another win at the Gold Coast 600.

In 2019, Tickford Racing upgraded to the new Ford Mustang GT. It was a moderately successful year, with a single win at Albert Park and several podiums.

Chaz announced that he was leaving Tickford Racing, for Walkinshaw Andretti United after being with the team for 7 years. SCT Logistics terminated its sponsorship agreement with Tickford after Mostert's plans to depart the team, despite Supercheap Auto staying on as Title Sponsor for the following season, bringing to an end a 7-year association with the retail giant.

2020–present

SCT Logistics is the naming rights sponsor for the No.4 Brad Jones Racing Holden Commodore ZB driven by Jack Smith in the 2022 Supercars Championship. It also supports Tommy Smith, who is competing in the 2023 FIA Formula 3 Championship.

SCT also sponsors Honda Racing Australia in the Australian Supercross Championship and Australian ProMX Championship .
