= Downer EDI Rail GT46C =

Class of Australian diesel-electric locomotives

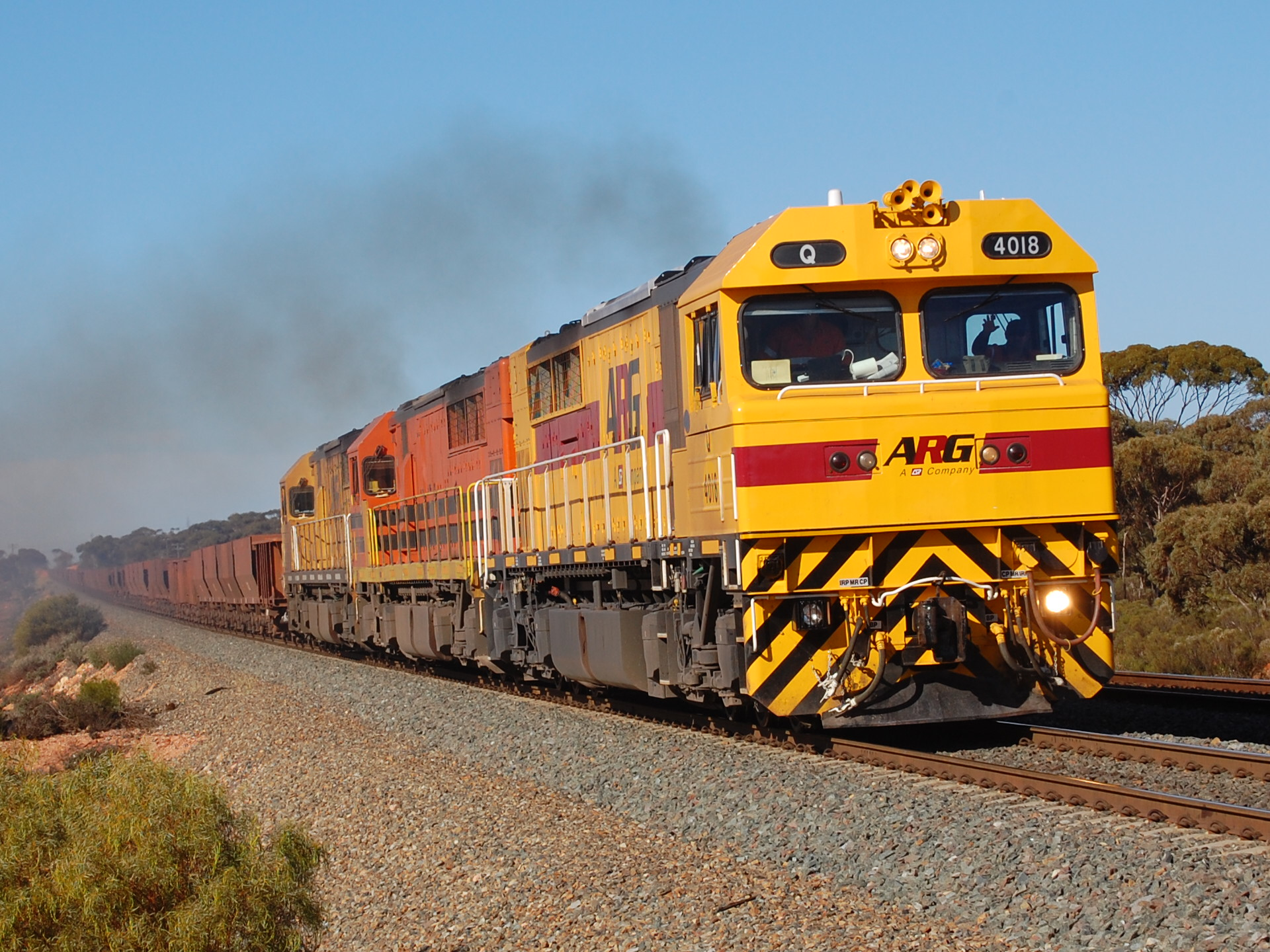
- Aurizon Q4018 in September 2009
Type and origin
- Power type: Diesel-electric
- Builder: Clyde Engineering, Forrestfield, Western Australia; EDI Rail, Cardiff; EDI Rail, Port Augusta
- Model: Electro-Motive Diesel GT46C
- Build date: 1997-2003
- Total produced: 24
Specifications
- Configuration
  - AAR: C-C
  - UIC: Co-Co, Co'Co'
- Gauge: 1,435 mm (4 ft 8 1/2 in) standard gauge
- Length: 22 m (72 ft 2 in)
- Loco weight: 134 t (132 long tons; 148 short tons)
- Fuel type: Diesel
- Prime mover: Electro-Motive Diesel 16-710G3B-ES
- Aspiration: Turbocharger
- Generator: Electro-Motive Diesel AR11 PBEH
- Traction motors: Electro-Motive Diesel D87BTRL
- Cylinders: 16
- MU working: AAR
- Loco brake: Air brake
- Train brakes: Air brake
Performance figures
- Maximum speed: 115 km/h (71 mph)
- Power output: 3,100 kW (4,200 hp)
Career
- Operators: Aurizon
- Class: Q/FQ/V class (Aurizon)
- Number in class: 24
- Numbers: Q4001-Q4019; V544; FQ01-FQ04
- Locale: Australia
- Delivered: 13 July 1997
- First run: 14 July 1997
- Last run: December 2003
- Current owner: Aurizon
- Disposition: 24 in service

The Downer EDI Rail GT46C is a model of diesel-electric locomotive designed and built by Clyde Engineering using Electro-Motive Diesel components. A number of Australian rail freight operators purchased them from 2022; Aurizon designated its units as the Q/FQ/V class. As of July 2022, all 24 locomotives are owned by Aurizon.

== By operator ==
=== Westrail ===
In May 1996, Westrail ordered 15 GT46Cs from Clyde Engineering as part of an order that also included nine narrow gauge S class locomotives. The order was later extended to 19. All were assembled at a facility established by Clyde Engineering within Westrail's Forrestfield Depot to fulfill the contract with components manufactured at Clyde's Kelso and Somerton plants. All were included in the sale of Westrail to Australian Railroad Group in December 2000 and again to QR National in June 2006. Initially numbered as the Q class, they were later reclassified as the 4000 class.

Nineteen locomotives were built for Westrail and delivered between 1997 and 1998 as the Q class, for use on standard gauge services in Western Australia.

=== Freight Australia ===
Following the destruction of two G class locomotives in 1999, Freight Australia ordered a single GT46AC from EDI Rail who had purchased Clyde Engineering. It was built at their Cardiff Locomotive Workshops in 2002. Numbered V544, it was named after Deputy Prime Minister Tim Fischer. It was included in the sale of the business to Pacific National in February 2004. The locomotive initially operated interstate freight duties, primarily the SCT Logistics service from Melbourne to Perth. In late 2007, it moved to haul Leigh Creek to Port Augusta coal trains in South Australia, servicing the Playford B and Northern power stations. Between March 2014 and May 2021, V544 was stored at Port Augusta workshops after a major engine failure. In May 2021, it was sold to One Rail Australia and has since been painted into their livery. The Tim Fischer name was retained. It is currently in service, with the ORA logos painted over and replaced with Aurizon ones.

=== FreightLink ===
In 2003, four were built by EDI Rail at Port Augusta for FreightLink. They were purchased for use on the Adelaide-Darwin railway. The first two units were painted in Indigenous Australian liveries, the other two were in FreightLink red. All were included in the sale of FreightLink to One Rail Australia, and later the sale of ORA to Aurizon.

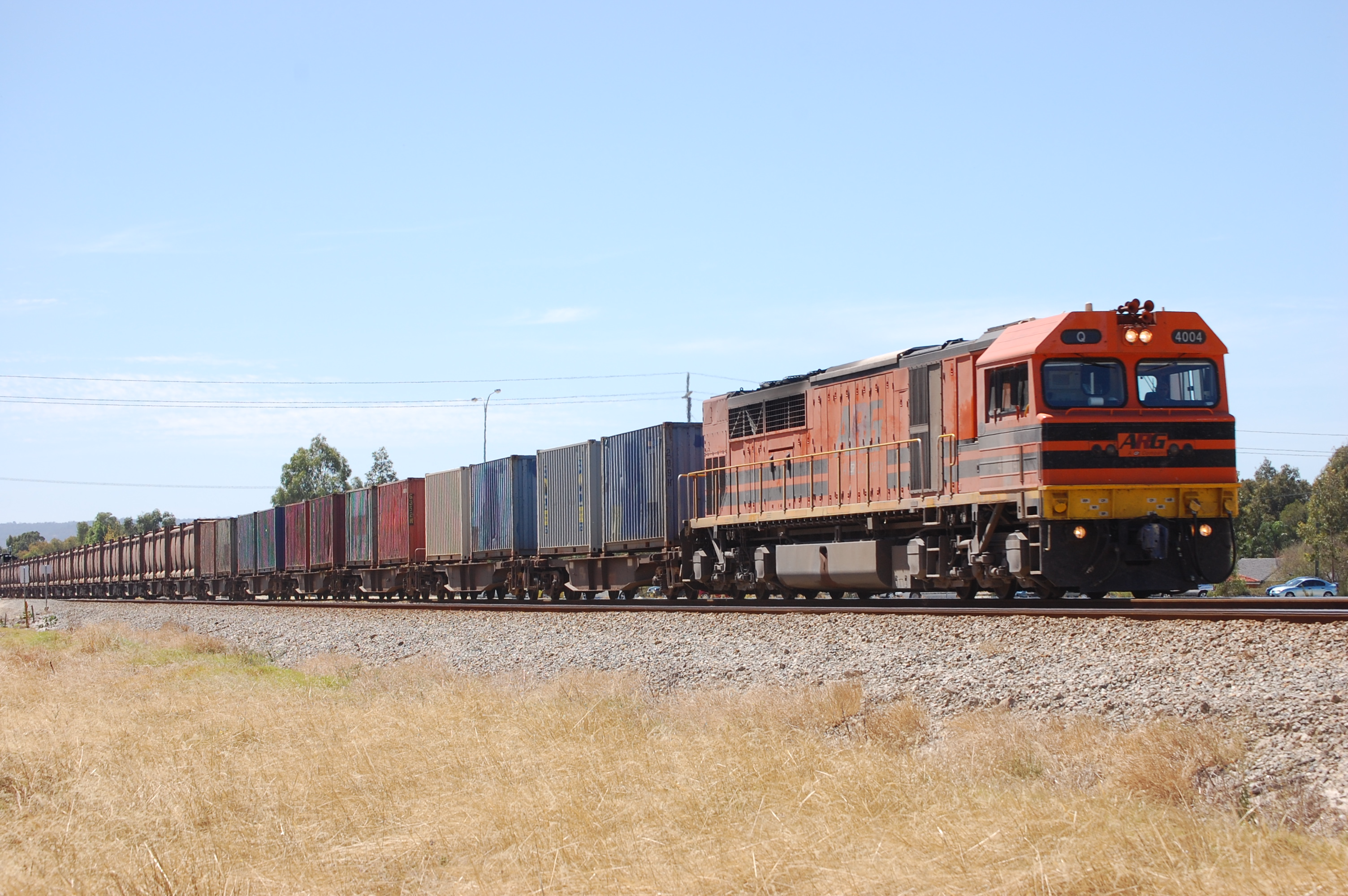
Australian Railroad Group Q4004 in March 2009

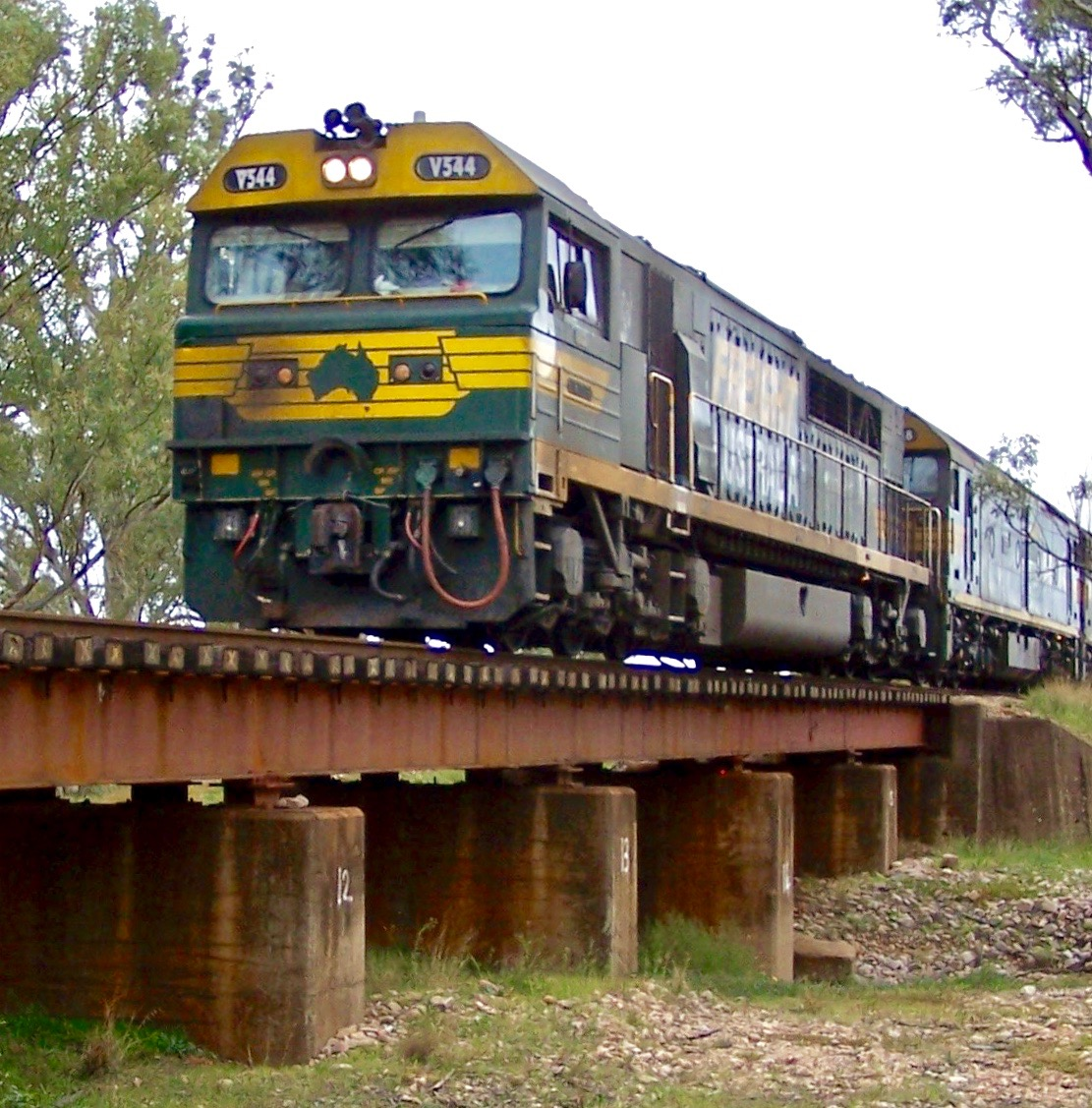
Pacific National V544 at Mambray Creek, South Australia in August 2007

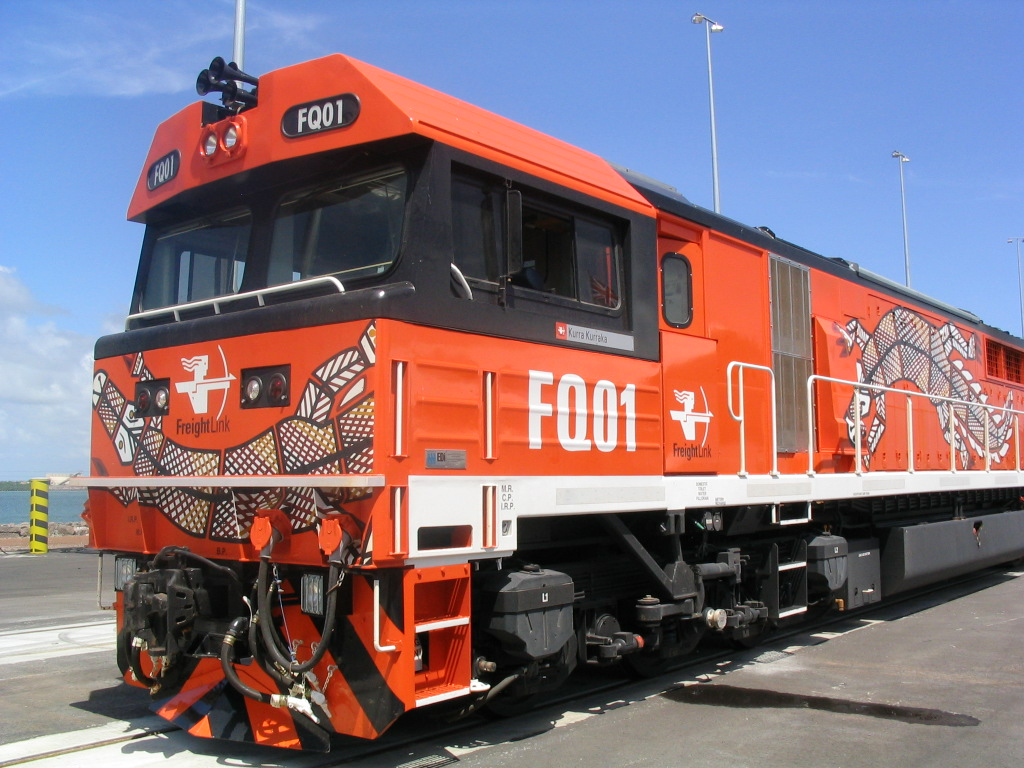
FreightLink indigenous liveried FQ01 in Darwin in January 2004

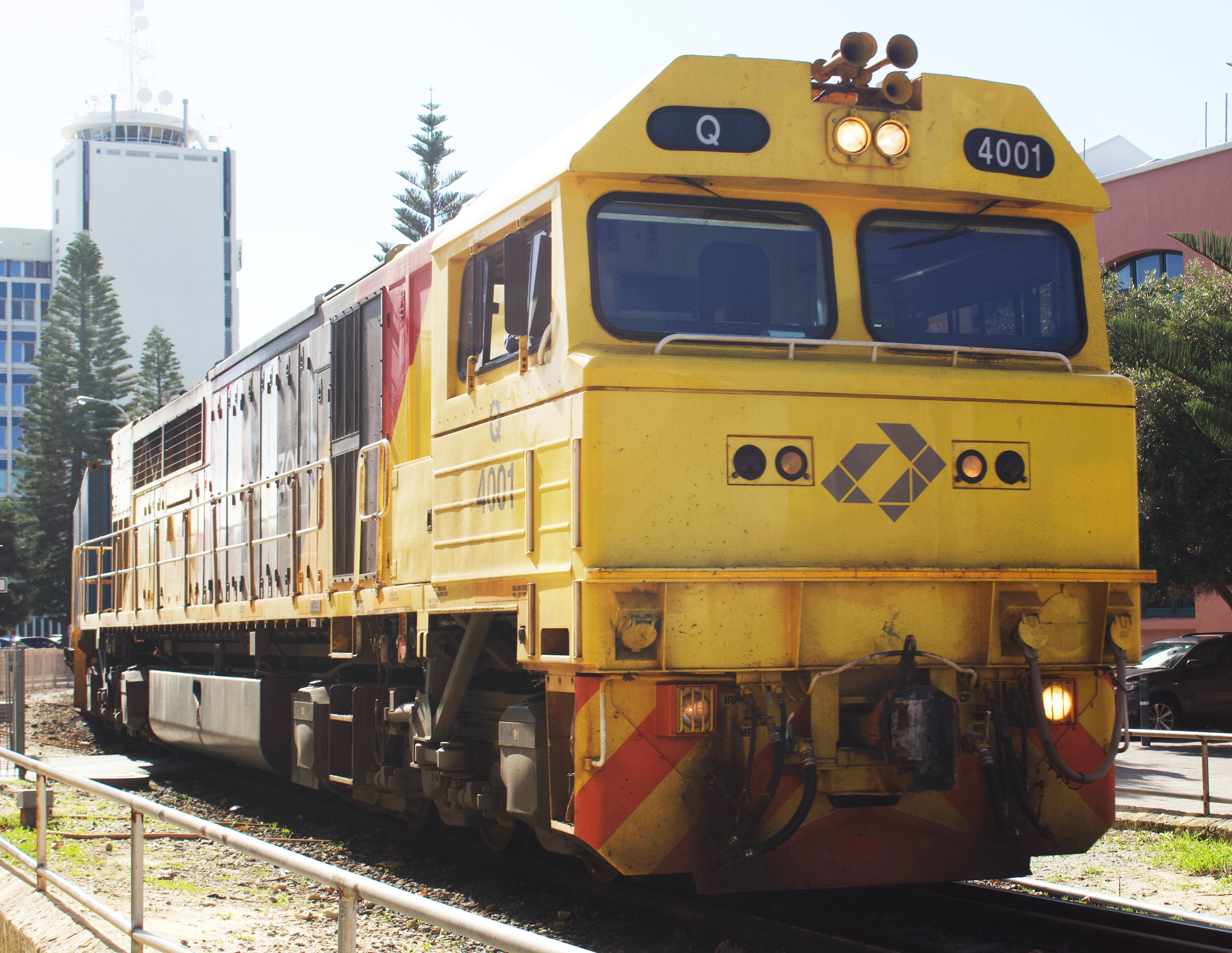
Q 4001 Aurizon Bulk Freight West train in Fremantle.

== Aurizon Service ==
Key:	In service	Stored or withdrawn	Preserved	Under Overhaul	Converted	Scrapped

=== Q class ===
Number	Original number	In service	Out of service	Current owner	Livery	Previous owners	Status
Q4001	Q301	1997/1998		Aurizon	Aurizon - Yellow, Orange, Red & Grey	Westrail (1997–2000), Australian Railroad Group (2000–2011)	In Service
Q4002	Q302	1997/1998	Taken out of service following a collision with a truck at Parkeston on 22 February 2021.	Aurizon	Aurizon - Yellow, Orange, Red & Grey	Westrail (1997–2000), Australian Railroad Group (2000–2011)	Under Overhaul Cab New FXN3B.
Q4003	Q303	1997/1998		Aurizon	Aurizon Basic Yellow	Westrail (1997–2000), Australian Railroad Group (2000–2011)	In service
Q4004	Q304	1997/1998		Aurizon	Aurizon Basic Yellow	Westrail (1997–2000), Australian Railroad Group (2000–2011)	In service
Q4005	Q305	1997/1998		Aurizon	ARG Orange & Black	Westrail (1997–2000), Australian Railroad Group (2000–2011)	In service
Q4006	Q306	1997/1998		Aurizon	Aurizon - Yellow, Orange, Red & Grey	Westrail (1997–2000), Australian Railroad Group (2000–2011)	In service
Q4007	Q307	1997/1998		Aurizon	Aurizon - Yellow, Orange, Red & Grey	Westrail (1997–2000), Australian Railroad Group (2000–2011)	In service
Q4008	Q308	1997/1998		Aurizon	Aurizon - Yellow, Orange, Red & Grey	Westrail (1997–2000), Australian Railroad Group (2000–2011)	In service
Q4009	Q309	1997/1998		Aurizon	Aurizon - Yellow, Orange, Red & Grey	Westrail (1997–2000), Australian Railroad Group (2000–2011)	In service
Q4010	Q310	1997/1998		Aurizon	ARG/QR Yellow & Maroon	Westrail (1997–2000), Australian Railroad Group (2000–2011)	In service
Q4011	Q311	1997/1998		Aurizon	Aurizon - Yellow, Orange, Red & Grey	Westrail (1997–2000), Australian Railroad Group (2000–2011)	In service
Q4012	Q312	1997/1998		Aurizon	Aurizon Basic Yellow	Westrail (1997–2000), Australian Railroad Group (2000–2011)	In service
Q4013	Q313	1997/1998		Aurizon	Aurizon Basic Yellow	Westrail (1997–2000), Australian Railroad Group (2000–2011)	In service
Q4014	Q314	1997/1998		Aurizon	Aurizon Basic Yellow	Westrail (1997–2000), Australian Railroad Group (2000–2011)	In service
Q4015	Q315	1997/1998		Aurizon	ARG/QR Yellow & Maroon	Westrail (1997–2000), Australian Railroad Group (2000–2011)	In service
Q4016	Q316	1998		Aurizon	Aurizon Basic Yellow	Westrail (1997–2000), Australian Railroad Group (2000–2011)	In service
Q4017	Q317	1998		Aurizon	Westrail Yellow & Blue with Aurizon Logos	Westrail (1997–2000), Australian Railroad Group (2000–2011)	In service
Q4018	Q318	1998		Aurizon	Aurizon Basic Yellow	Westrail (1997–2000), Australian Railroad Group (2000–2011)	In service
Q4019	Q319	1998		Aurizon	ARG/QR Yellow & Maroon	Westrail (1997–2000), Australian Railroad Group (2000–2011)	In service

=== V class ===
Number	Name	In service	Out of service	Current owner	Livery	Previous owners	Status
V544	Tim Fischer	July 2002		Aurizon	ORA Orange & Black With Aurizon Logos	Freight Australia (2002–2004), Pacific National (2004–2021), One Rail Australia (2021–2022)	In service

=== FQ class ===
Number	Name	In service	Out of service	Current owner	Livery	Previous owners	Status
FQ01	Kurra Kurraka	December 2003		Aurizon	ORA Orange & Black With Aurizon Logos	FreightLink (2003–2010), One Rail Australia (2010–2022)	In service
FQ02	Purnu	December 2003		Aurizon	ORA Orange & Black With Aurizon Logos	FreightLink (2003–2010), One Rail Australia (2010–2022)	In service
FQ03	Wagiman	December 2003		Aurizon	ORA Orange & Black With Aurizon Logos	FreightLink (2003–2010), One Rail Australia (2010–2022)	In service
FQ04	Aboriginal Stockman	December 2003		Aurizon	ORA Orange & Black With Aurizon Logos	FreightLink (2003–2010), One Rail Australia (2010–2022)	In service

== Related development ==
- New South Wales 90 class locomotive, ancestor model GT46CWM
- Downer EDI Rail GT46C ACe, derivative model
