= Southern Shorthaul Railroad =

Australian rail freight services operator

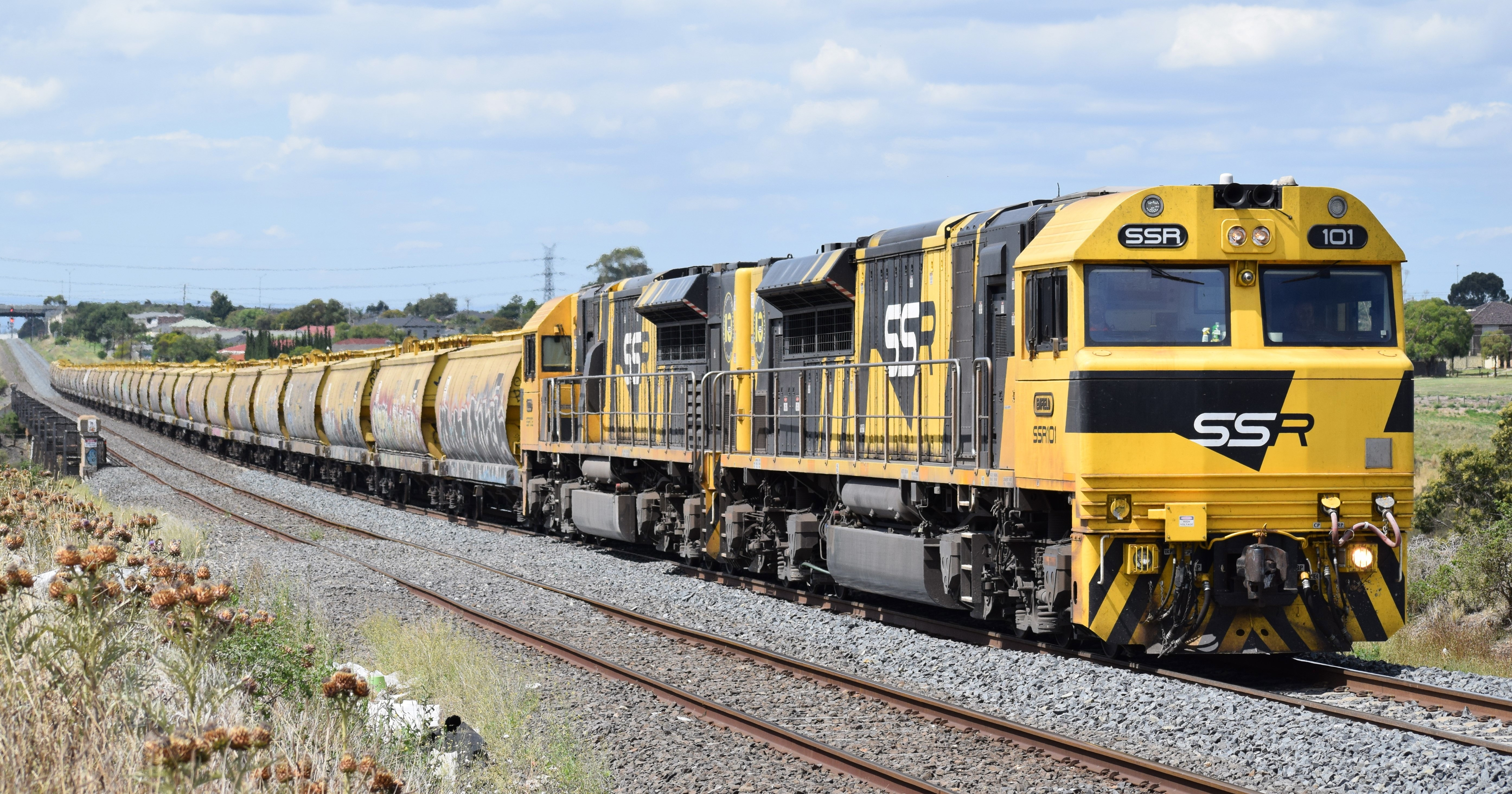
- SSR locomotives at Mcintyre, Victoria, Australia
- Type: Private
- Industry: Railway operator
- Predecessor: Great Northern Rail Services
- Founded: December 2003
- Headquarters: East Bendigo
- Area served: New South Wales; Victoria
- Services: Rail Freight Services; Workshop Services
- Subsidiaries: Consolidated Rail Leasing
- Website: http://ssrail.com.au/

Southern Shorthaul Railroad (SSR) (also known as Holdco Holdings) is an Australian rail freight services operator in New South Wales and Victoria. The company also provides workshop services, such as rolling stock manufacturing and wagon and locomotive maintenance.

== History ==
In 2010, SSR entered the coal haulage market. Operating on behalf of Centennial Coal, it operated trains from the NSW Western Coalfields (Airly, Clarence, Charbon and Lidsdale collieries), as well as Newstan Colliery, to ports at Kooragang Island, Carrington and Port Kembla. In 2018, the company began Hunter Valley operations, using three CEY class and 90 PHTH hoppers.

The company also refurbishes and repairs locomotives and rolling stock at the former Bendigo Workshops in Victoria. It also has a maintenance facility at the Lithgow State Mine Heritage Park & Railway.

In 2012, SSR formed a subsidiary, BRM Leasing. In October 2012, the name was changed to Consolidated Rail Leasing (CRL). Some of the SSR fleet was made available for lease through CRL. CRL ceased operations in 2021.

In 2013, SSR celebrated 10 years in business, created a special logo, and painted the then-new SSR class in a variation of its standard yellow and black livery. In December 2013, SSR began operating a container service from Kelso to Port Botany. The train primarily carries containerised grain, and has considerably grown in size since it first started running. In 2014, SSR commenced operating grain services in New South Wales for George Weston Foods.

2016 was a year of rapid expansion for SSR, when it bought the Greentrains locomotive fleet (excluding 8026 and T383 which Greentrains retained). That meant SSR no longer had to hire motive power, such as the VL class locomotives, and could expand its operations. SSR also purchased 180 coal wagons, after the Leigh Creek coal train ceased running. SSR has since converted them into grain wagons by modifying the bottom discharge doors and fitting fibreglass lids. They have formed three grain trains, ranging from 50 to 60 wagons.

In April 2023, in an agreement similar to SSR's existing operating agreements with Fletcher's International Exports and Centennial Coal, it was announced that SSR had signed a long-term agreement with Manildra Group to provide train crews and oversee daily operation of Manildra's grain and container trains. To provide rolling stock for these services, Manildra ordered 17 GT46C-ACe Gen II MAN Class locomotives from Progress Rail, built in and imported from the United States, 222 100t aluminium bodied grain wagons, 60 100 tonne flour wagons and 103 100 tonne, 60ft container wagons. This replaces Manildra Group's existing agreement with Pacific National, who provided their own rolling stock to service Manildra Group's requirements. The contract gives SSR 100% of the market share of domestic milling grain hauled by rail in NSW and Victoria. The contract began on 1 November 2024, using a mix of 8 MAN class locomotives as well as hired motive power from RailFirst Asset Management and Aurizon to account for the delayed arrival of the remaining 9 MAN class units.

In May 2026, four "AC50" model diesel-electric locomotives designed and manufactured in China by CRRC Ziyang Co. Ltd, arrived at the Port of Newcastle. Classified as the CAC class and carrying road numbers CAC201-CAC204, they are powered by a 5000-horsepower medium-speed diesel engine powering an AC-DC-AC transmission system. The locomotives are reported as meeting stringent EU UIC IIIA emission standards. Maximum speed is 100 km/h (62 mph); axle load is 25 long tons (25.4 tonnes). To withstand Australia's sometimes extreme climate of high heat and dust, the locomotives have independent ventilation and cooling systems. They incorporate a predictive health management system, enabling real-time monitoring of core components to ensure reliable operation.

On 5 July 2026, the Office of the National Rail Safety Regulator (ONRSR) suspended SSR's accreditation under the Rail Safety National Law. That followed a derailment at Berrima, New South Wales in which "several wagons rolled away and derailed at a level crossing on a public road". ONRSR noted that the runaway derailment was "the latest in a series of safety incidents", which led to the suspension decision. On 10 July, ONRSR partially lifted the suspension, allowing SSR to complete "low risk" operations. On 21 July, was permitted SSR to undertake additional rail operations which were deemed by ONRSR to be “no longer posing a serious and immediate risk to safety”.

== Fleet ==
SSR operates a combination of owned and leased locomotives, most of which are significantly older than the locomotives of competing rail companies.

As of November 2026, SSR operated the following locomotives:

Class	Image	Type	Model	Gauge	Number	Units	Notes
Owned Fleet
422 class		Diesel-electric	EMD J26C	Standard	1	42216	Stored Cootamundra
442 class		Diesel-electric	Alco DL-500G	Standard	6	44204, 44206, 44217, 44220, 44223, 44226	44226 on static display at Junee Roundhouse Railway Museum
45 class		Diesel-electric	Alco DL-541	Standard	1	4532	
48 class		Diesel-electric	Alco DL531	Standard	5	4811, 4815, 4828, 4829, 4843	
49 class		Diesel-electric	EMD G8C	Standard	5	4904, 4908, 4910, 4911, 4917	4910 stored North Bendigo as a parts source
600 class		Diesel-electric	Alco DL-541	Standard	2	602, 603	
80 class		Diesel-electric	Comeng CE615A	Standard	1	8049	
830 class		Diesel-electric	Alco DL531	Standard	1	869	
A class		Diesel Electric	EMD AAT22C-2R	Broad	1	A70	
B class		Diesel-electric	EMD ML2	Standard - B61, B75 Broad - B76, B80	4	B61, B75, B76, B80	
BRM class		Diesel-electric	EMD GT26C	Standard	2	BRM001, BRM002	
C class		Diesel-electric	EMD GT26CW	Standard	9	C502 - C510	
CAC class		Diesel-electric	CRRC Ziyang AC50	Standard	4	CAC201 - CAC204	Delivered May 2026
CL Class		Diesel-electric	EMD/Morrison Knudsen AT26C-2M (CLF) AT26HC-2M (CLP)	Standard	4	CLF1, CLF3, CLP9, CLP12	CLF1 stored North Bendigo as a parts source
G class		Diesel-electric	EMD JT26C-2SS	Standard	2	G513, G514	
GM class		Diesel-electric	EMD ML1 (GM1 - GM11), A16C (GM12 - GM47)	Standard	3	GM10, GM22, GM27	
L Class		Diesel-electric	EMD GT26C	Standard	1	L277	In service, based at Gunnedah
MRL Class		Diesel-electric	GE C44ACi	Standard	6	MRL001 – MRL006	
N class		Diesel-electric	EMD JT22HC-2	Standard	1	N451	N451 sold to SSR in March 2026
P class		Diesel-electric	EMD G18HBR	Broad	10	P11, P12, P14, P15, P16, P17, P18, P21, P22, P23	P11 stored North Bendigo as a parts source
RL class		Diesel-electric	NREC AT36-C	Standard	6	RL301, RL302, RL304, RL305, RL306, RL307	
S class		Diesel-electric	EMD A16C	Standard	3	S311, S312, S317	
SSR class		Diesel-electric	EMD GT46C-ACe	Standard	4	SSR101 - SSR104	
T class		Diesel-electric	EMD G8	Standard	7	T363, T381, T385, T386, T390, T408, T409	T385 stored North Bendigo as a parts source
Y class		Diesel-electric	EMD G6B	Standard - Y124, Y152, Y169 Broad - Y129	4	Y124, Y129, Y152, Y169	Y129 North Bendigo shunter. Y124, Y152, Y169 stored Junee
Leased Fleet
CL Class		Diesel-electric	EMD/Morrison Knudsen AT26C-2M (CLF) AT26HC-2M (CLP)	Standard	3	CLF2, CLF4, CLP13	Leased from RailPower, CLF4 under repair after level crossing accident
N class		Diesel-electric	EMD JT22HC-2	Standard - N457, N469 Broad - N454, N455, N456, N459, N461, N462, N463, N464, N466, N470, N471, N472, N473, N474, N475	17	N454, N455, N456, N457, N459, N461, N462, N463, N464, N466, N469, N470, N471 N472, N473, N474, N475	Leased from V/Line
Previous Fleet
RT class		Diesel-Mechanical	Fordson Diesel Major	Broad	3	RT37, RT50, RT54	All scrapped in 2025

=== Other ===
As of November 2026, SSR operated the following locomotives on behalf of other owners:

Class	Image	Type	Model	Gauge	Number	Units	Notes
Fleet operated by SSR
CEY class		Diesel-electric	GE C44ACi	Standard	7	CEY001 - CEY007	Used on Centennial Coal services from the Western Coalfields to Kooragang Island or occasionally to Port Kembla. They are also infrequently used on services to Newstan Colliery, Eraring Power Station and Vales Point Power Station.
FIE class		Diesel-electric	GE C44ACi	Standard	4	FIE001 - FIE004	Used on the Fletcher's International Exports container service between Dubbo and Port Botany. They are also used to transport cement from Fletcher's Dubbo terminal to Hermidale on the Cobar railway line.
G Class		Diesel-electric	EMD JT26C-2SS	Standard	2	G516, G534	Owned by Swift Transport and used on 20 port shuttles per week from NSW Ports’s Enfield Intermodal Logistics Centre to Port Botany and vice versa.
MAN class		Diesel-electric	EMD GT46C-ACe	Standard	17	MAN001 - MAN017	Owned by Manildra Group for use on their grain services thought out New South Wales.
