= Victorian Railways C class (diesel) =

Class of diesel locomotives used in Australia

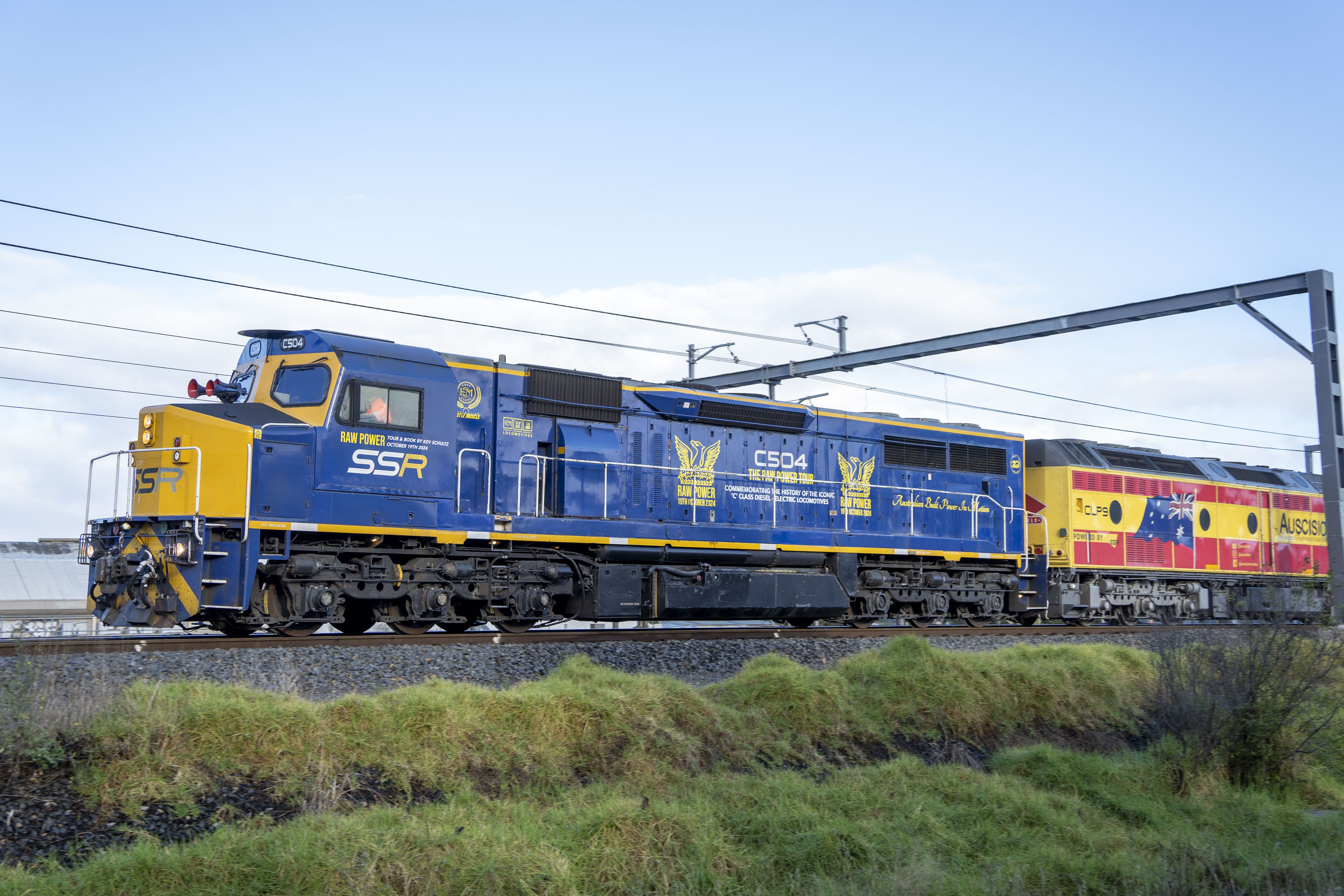
- C504 passing through Sunshine, Victoria in April 2024
Type and origin
- Power type: Diesel-electric
- Builder: Clyde Engineering, Rosewater
- Model: EMD GT26CW
- Build date: 1977–1978
- Total produced: 10
Specifications
- Configuration
  - AAR: C-C
  - UIC: Co′Co'
  - Commonwealth: Co-Co
- Gauge: 1,435 mm (4 ft 8 1/2 in)
- Length: 20.73 m (68 ft 0 in)
- Loco weight: 135 tonnes (133 long tons; 149 short tons)
- Fuel type: Diesel
- Fuel capacity: 10,130 L (2,230 imp gal; 2,680 US gal)
- Prime mover: EMD 16-645E3 Rebuilt: EMD 16-645E3C
- Engine type: V16 diesel engine
- Aspiration: Turbocharged
- Alternator: EMD AR-10
- Traction motors: EMD D77/78 DC, 6 of
- Cylinders: 16
- Cylinder size: 645 in^{3} (10,570 cm^{3})
- Loco brake: Air brakes
- Train brakes: Air brakes
Performance figures
- Maximum speed: 133 km/h (83 mph)
- Power output: 2,237 kW (3,000 hp) Rebuilt: 2,460 kW (3,300 hp)
Career
- Operators: Victorian Railways
- Class: C
- Number in class: 10
- Numbers: C501-C510
- Locale: Southern Australia
- Delivered: 1977–78
- First run: 14 May 1977
- Last run: 11 July 1978
- Preserved: C501
- Current owner: Southern Shorthaul Railroad; Seymour Railway Heritage Centre
- Disposition: 10 operational

The C Class are a class of diesel locomotive built by Clyde Engineering, Rosewater for the Victorian Railways in 1977–1978.

== History ==
The C class were purchased by the Victorian Railways for heavy freight haulage. They are a variant of the WAGR L class (itself an Australianised EMD SD40) fitted with safety cabs. Initially, the first four were placed on the North East line to haul services from Melbourne to Albury while the latter six were put on the broad gauge to haul services on the Serviceton line. Following upgrades to the infrastructure, they were also able to operate on the Ballarat to Geelong line and from January 1982 through to Adelaide with the standard gauge units transferred to the broad gauge.

Prior to delivery the expectation was that the engines would be classed H220 to H229, corresponding to builders' numbers 76-824 through 76-833. The H class at this time would have been in homage to the Victorian Railways' largest steam locomotive, H220 "Heavy Harry", but the class letter would have conflicted with diesel engines H1-H5 which were designed for use on the Melbourne hump yard.

The locomotives were delivered from Adelaide to Melbourne on the broad gauge interstate line, with the first arriving on 14 May 1977. It was converted to standard gauge two days later, named "George Brown" at a ceremony at Spencer Street station on 17 May 1977, and entered service on 20 May 1977. The first few engines were intended for use on standard gauge goods trains, but occasionally were required to operate passenger trains like the Intercapital Daylight. In these cases their lower maximum speed limit of 80 km/h (50 mph) guaranteed late running.

The first four engines were converted to standard gauge within days of delivery, each slotting into the North Eastern roster and only briefly returning to broad gauge every few years, possibly for maintenance at South Dynon workshops (for example, C504 from 12 to 24 January 1978).

On 3 August 1979, engines C505 and 506 ran through to Adelaide for the first time as part of a trial of through-running, in place of the previous practice involving changing locomotives at the border. C505 led on the westbound trip with a trailing load of 1,755 t (1,935 short tons) and 506 led on the eastbound with 1,804 t (1,989 short tons). A number of stop-and-start tests were undertaken on the Adelaide hills line to test the engines' ability to handle heavy loads, and running times were tested particularly between Tailem Bend and Mile End. New radio communication systems were also trialled between the driver and guard using fixed units in lieu of the earlier portable units. The trial was deemed a success, with through-running becoming a regular feature from 12 November. At the time a number of C Class engines were running on the standard gauge between Melbourne and Albury, and it was intended to recall these for broad gauge interstate work and have them replaced by GM class locomotives from Australian National Railways.

Bau lists the engines being repainted from Victorian Railways' blue and gold livery to V/Line orange in the period July 1986 to June 1992. By 30 October 1987 engines C503, 507, 508, 509 and 510 were joined by C505 in the orange livery.

In September 1988, C504 and C505 were transferred back to the standard gauge and began to operate services through to Sydney.

Following the Melbourne-Adelaide railway being closed for gauge conversion, the eight remaining broad gauge units were converted to standard gauge and operated services from Melbourne to Parkes until the converted line reopened in July 1995. All were transferred by V/Line to National Rail in June 1995.

Following the delivery of National Rail's NR class locomotives, the C class were put into storage at Junee Locomotive Depot in 1997 before being moved to Islington Railway Workshops, Adelaide. Unlike the other locomotives National Rail initially used, ownership of the C class passed to National Rail. In August 1999 two were repainted in National Rail livery and returned to service as Melbourne shunters.

C501 was acquired by the Seymour Railway Heritage Centre and the other nine went to Allco Rail, with two leased to Pacific National and seven to Silverton Rail as the Cs class. Following the collapse of Allco Finance three were sold to Chicago Freight Car Leasing Australia and six to Greentrains in January 2008 with all resuming their original identities.

In April 2016, the six Greentrains units were sold to Southern Shorthaul Railroad. Having been in store at South Dynon Locomotive Depot, all were taken to the Lithgow State Mine Heritage Park & Railway with the last returned to service in August 2016. As of February 2024, all 10 class members are operational with C502–C510 inclusive owned by SSR as of January 2025.

== Class list ==
Key:	In Service	Stored	Preserved	Converted	Under Overhaul	Scrapped

Locomotive	Name	Entered service	Owner	Operator	Livery	Status
C501	George Brown	14 May 1977	Seymour Railway Heritage Centre		VR Blue & gold	Operational
C502		22 June 1977	SSR		CFCLA blue & yellow	Operational
C503		19 July 1977	SSR		CFCLA blue & yellow	Operational
C504		18 August 1977	SSR		Blue & yellow (SSR & Raw Power logos)	Operational
C505	Rachel Bromwich	13 September 1977	SSR		SSR Yellow and Black	Operational
C506	Kara Nally	6 October 1977	SSR		SSR Yellow and Black	Operational
C507	Jo Ferguson	4 November 1977	SSR		SSR Yellow and Black	Operational
C508		16 December 1977	SSR		CFCLA blue & yellow	Operational
C509	Derek Larnach	10 March 1978	SSR		Greentrains green & yellow (SSR logos)	Operational
C510		11 July 1978	SSR		Greentrains green & yellow (SSR logos)	Operational

== Gallery ==
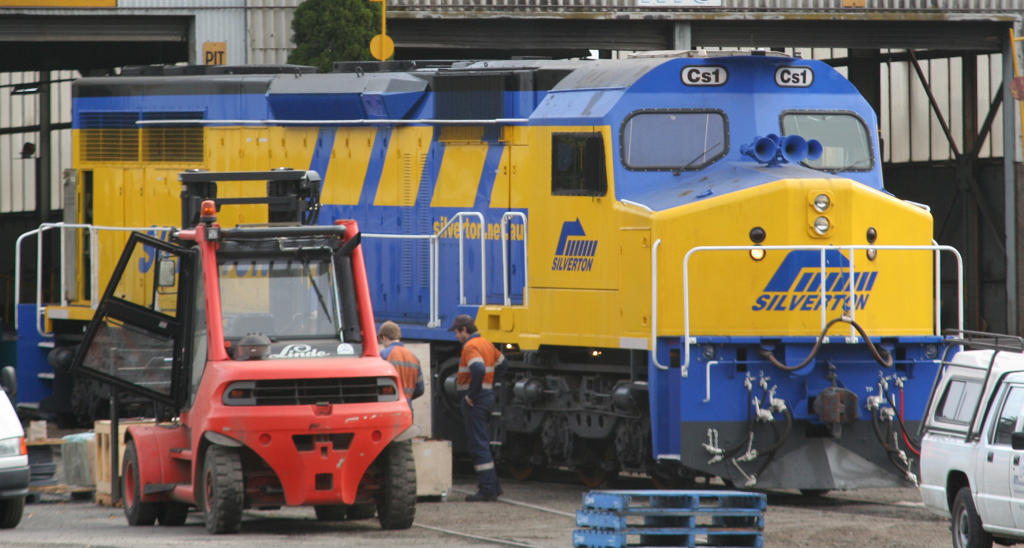
Silverton Rail Cs1 in June 2006

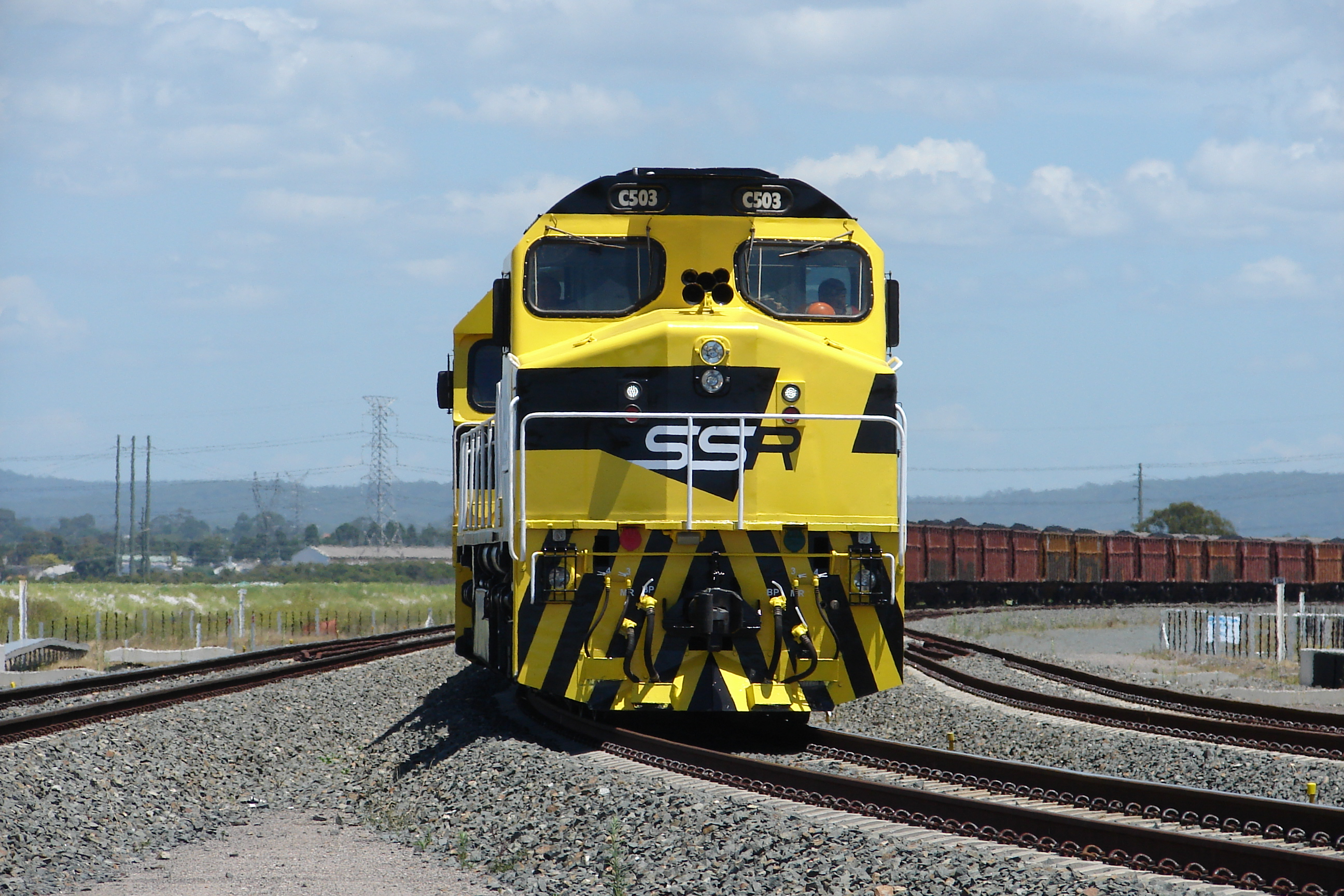
Southern Shorthaul Railroad C503 on Kooragang Island in January 2011

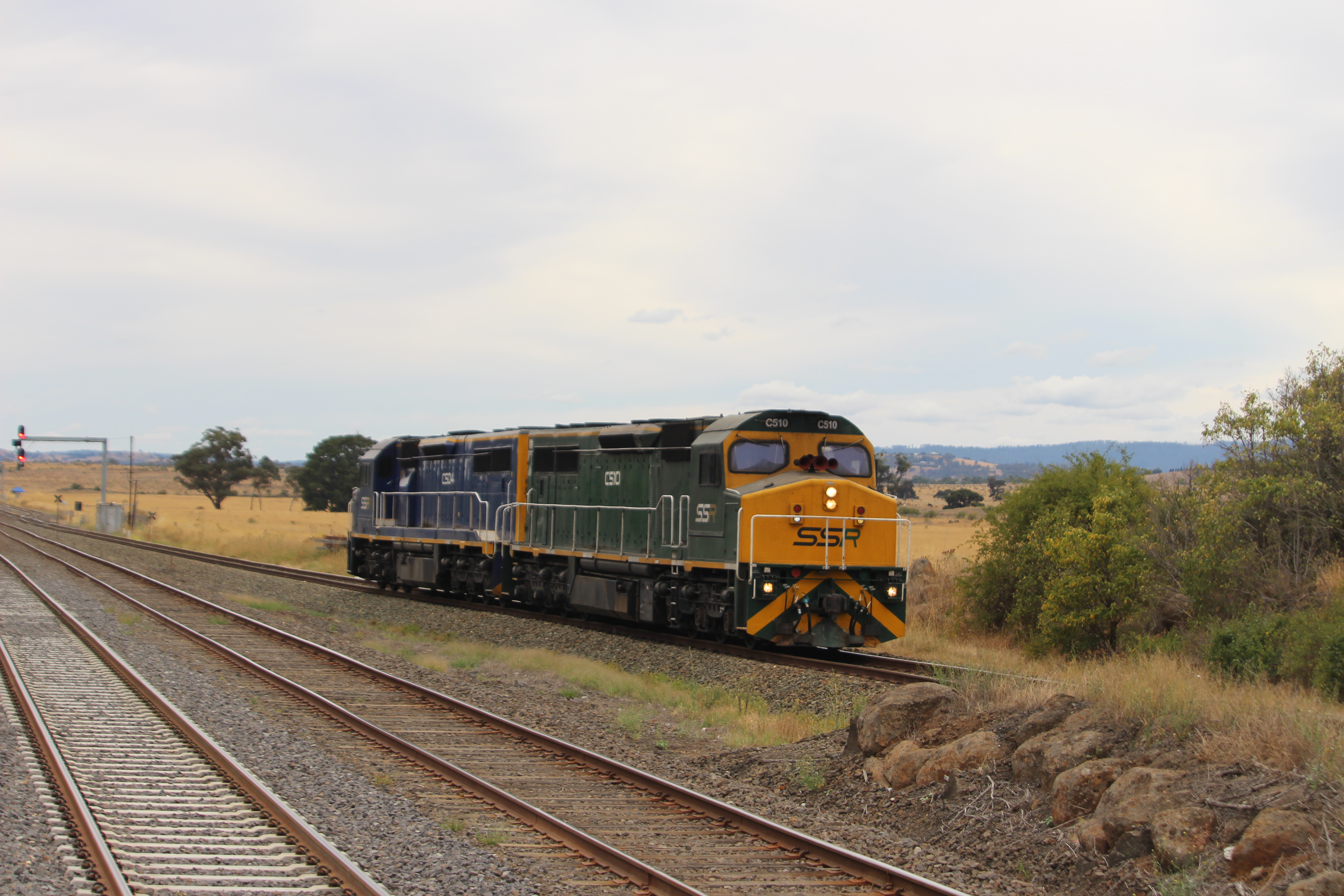
Southern Shorthaul Railroad C510 and C504 at Donnybrook

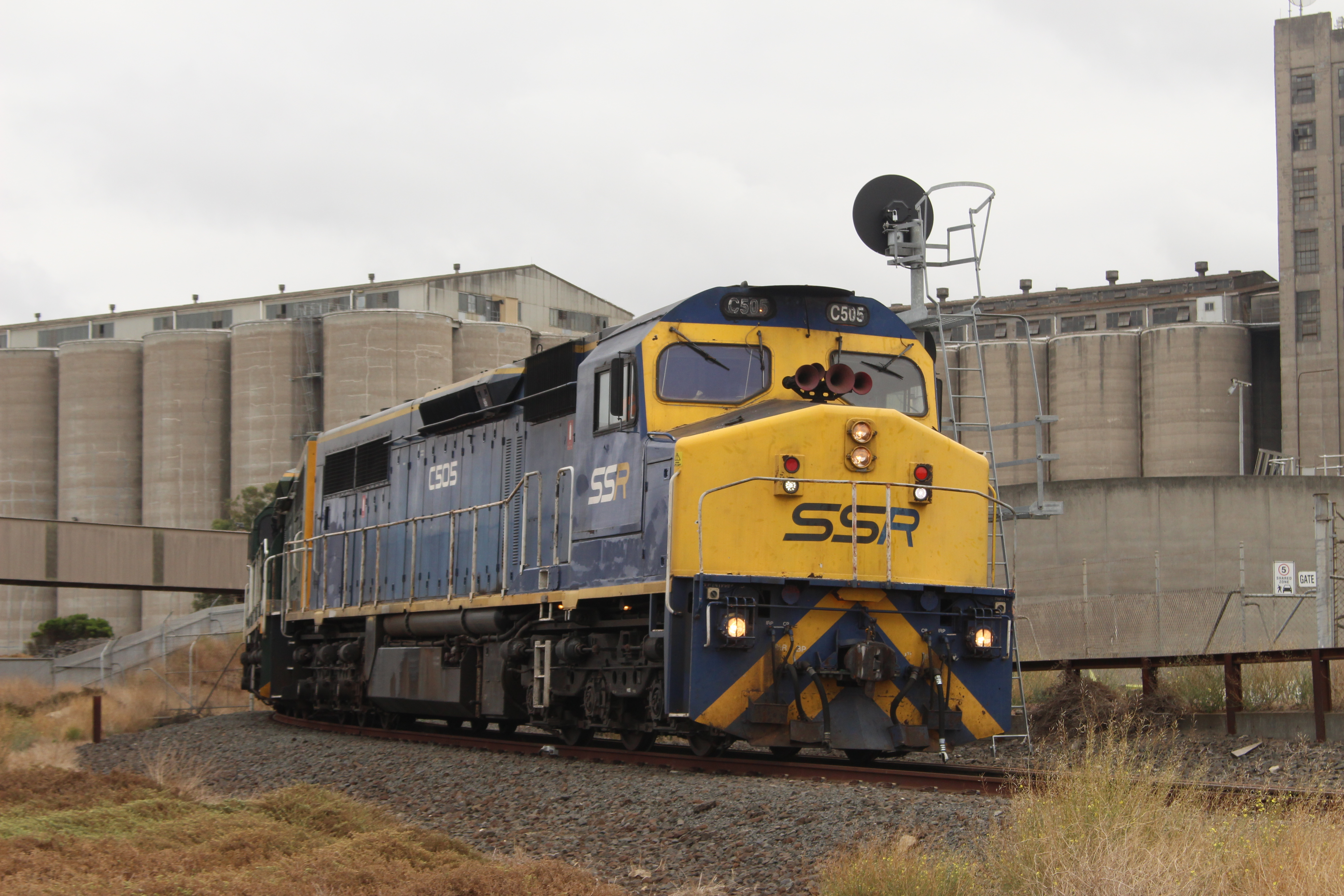
Southern Shorthaul Railroad C505 at North Geelong Grain Loop

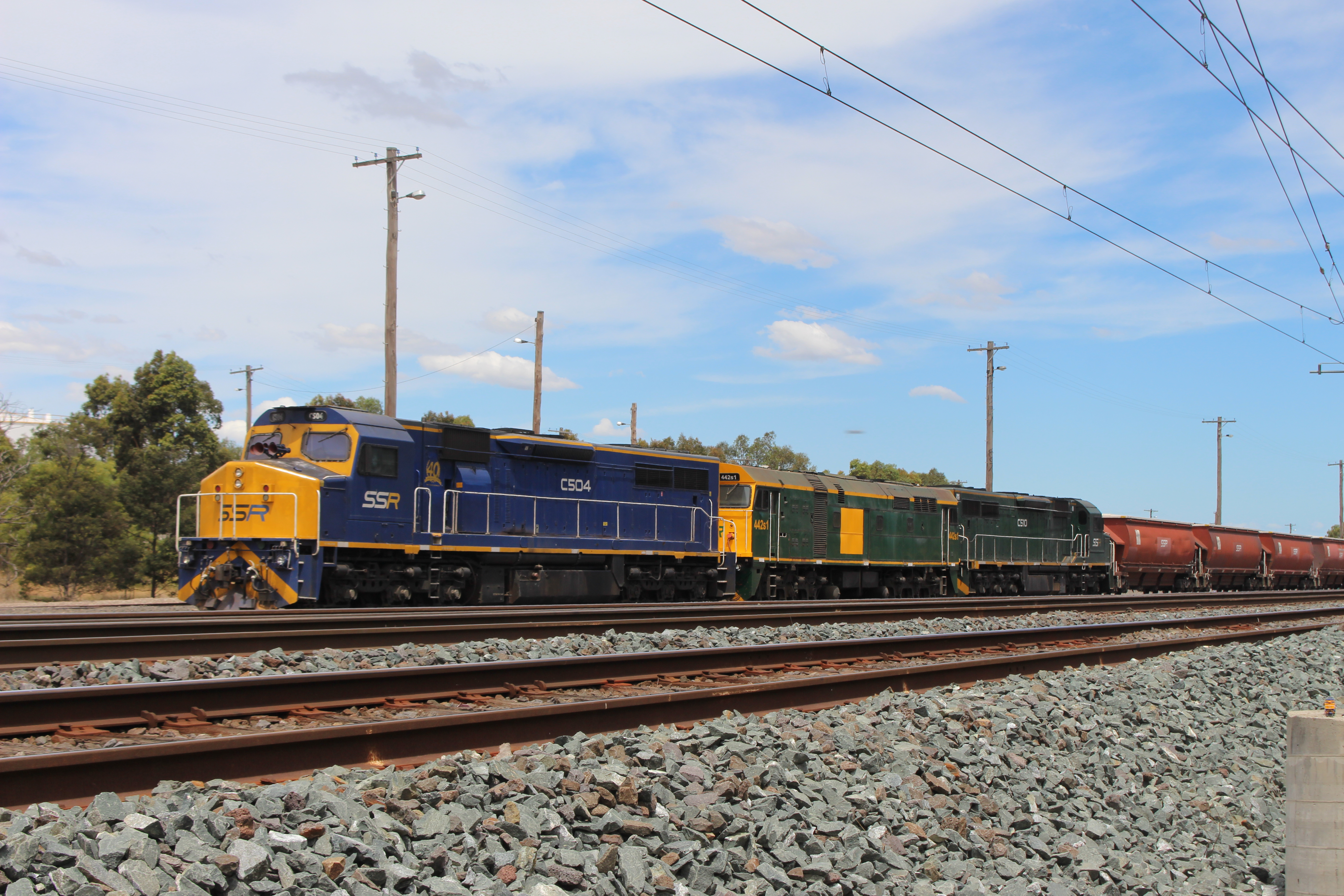
Southern Shorthaul Railroad C504-442s1-C510 Somerton

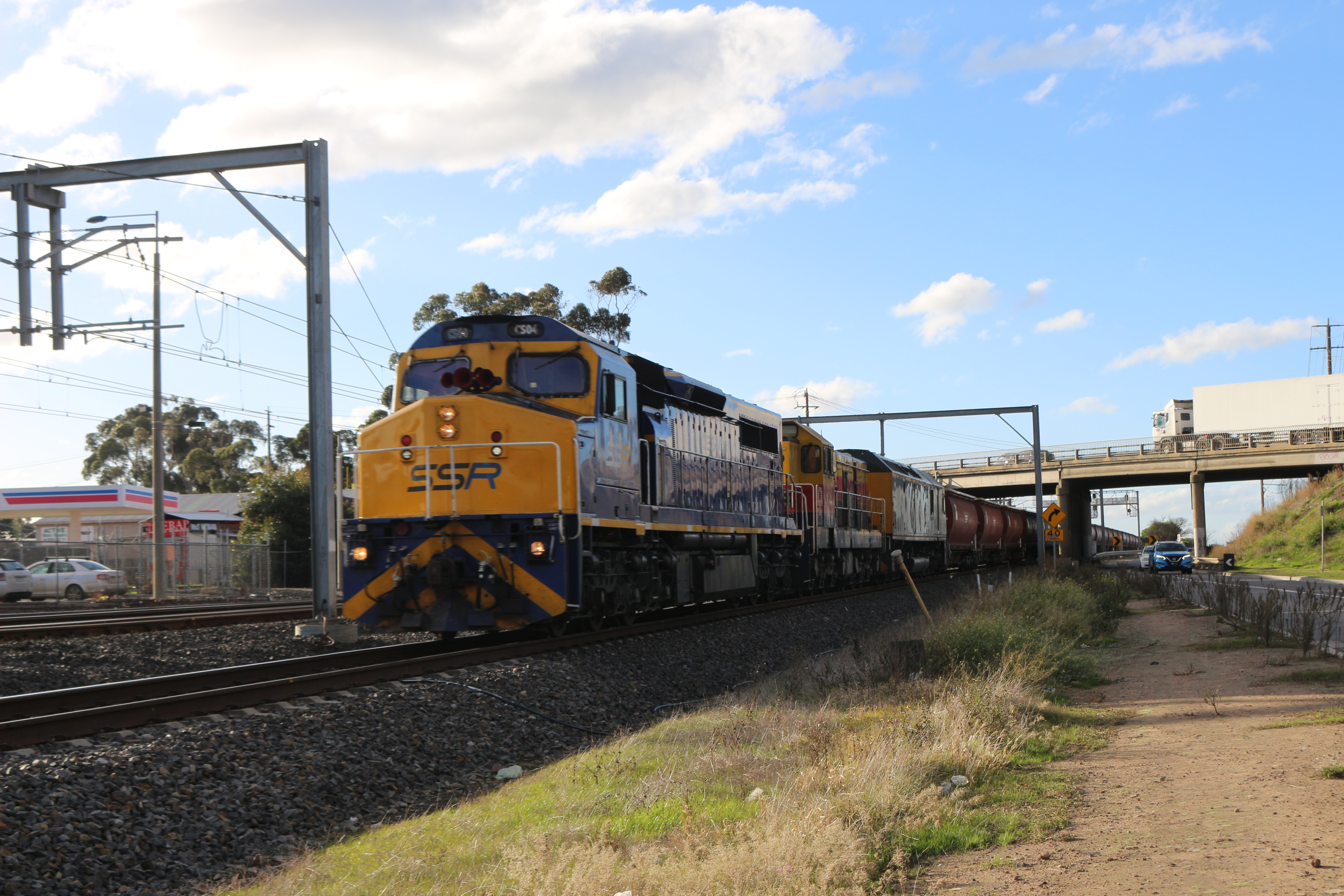
Southern Shorthaul Railroad C504 - 4911 - RL302 on a loaded SSR Grain train to Geelong at Craigieburn

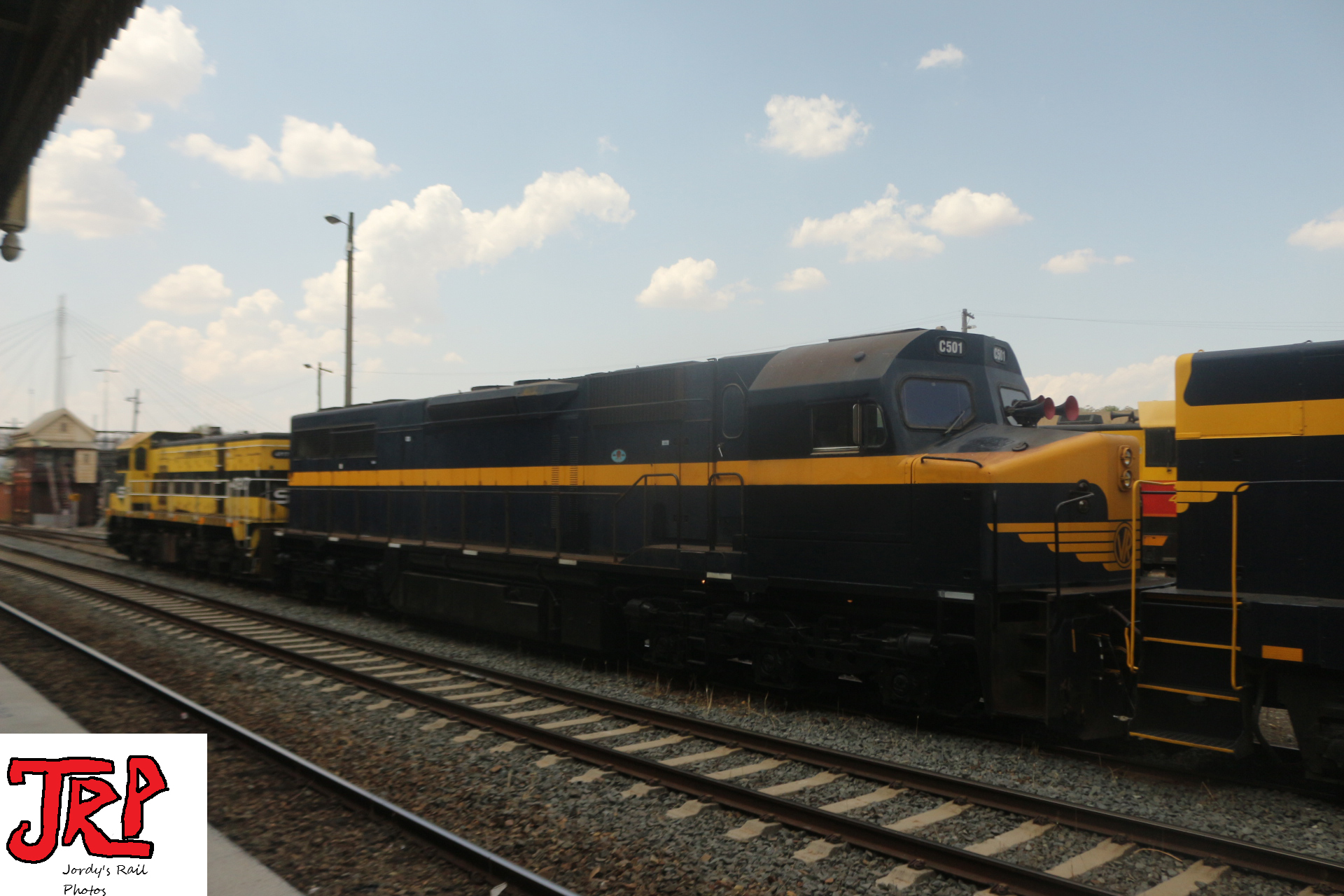
Victorian Railways Preserved C Class leader C501 in between Seymour Railway Heritage Centre's Victorian Railways T class (T357) and Southern Shorthaul Railroad's New South Wales 49 class locomotive (4917) at Albury
