= New South Wales 49 class locomotive =

Australian locomotive class

New South Wales 49 class
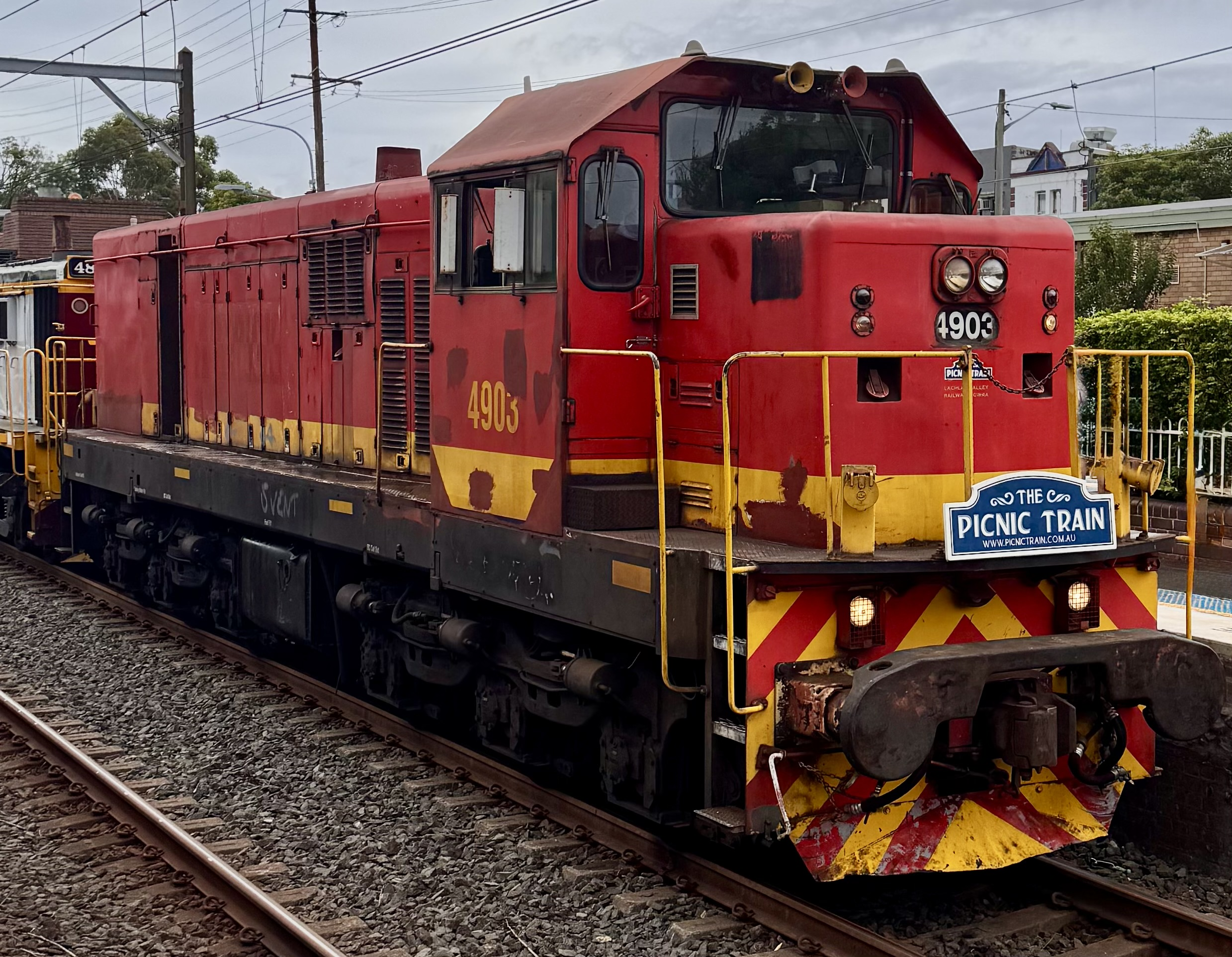
- 4903 at Sutherland in March 2026 on a Picnic Train tour to Kiama
Type and origin
- Power type: Diesel-electric
- Builder: Clyde Engineering, Granville
- Serial number: 60-221 to 60-226; 62-257 to 62-262; 64-342 to 64-347
- Model: EMD G8C
- Build date: 1960–1964
- Total produced: 18
Specifications
- Configuration
  - UIC: Co-Co
- Gauge: 4 ft 8 1/2 in (1,435 mm) standard gauge
- Wheel diameter: 40 in (1,016 mm)
- Length: Over headstocks: 46 ft 3 in (14.10 m), Over coupler pulling faces: 50 ft 5 in (15.37 m)
- Width: 9 ft 2 in (2.79 m)
- Height: 13 ft 9 in (4.19 m)
- Axle load: 13 long tons 6 cwt (29,800 lb or 13.5 t)
- Loco weight: 80 long tons 0 cwt (179,200 lb or 81.3 t)
- Fuel type: Diesel
- Fuel capacity: 690 imp gal (3,100 L; 830 US gal)
- Lubricant cap.: 108 imp gal (490 L; 130 US gal)
- Coolant cap.: 133 imp gal (600 L; 160 US gal)
- Sandbox cap.: 12 cu ft (0.34 m^{3})
- Prime mover: EMD 8-567C or 8-567CR
- RPM range: 275–835
- Engine type: Two-stroke V8 diesel
- Aspiration: Roots blower
- Generator: EMD D25
- Traction motors: EMD D29, 6 of
- Cylinders: 8
- Cylinder size: 8.5 in × 10 in (216 mm × 254 mm)
Performance figures
- Maximum speed: 77 mph (124 km/h)
- Power output: Gross: 950 hp (710 kW), For traction: 875 hp (650 kW)
- Tractive effort: Continuous: 37,200 lbf (165.47 kN) at 6.3 mph (10.1 km/h)
Career
- Operators: NSW Department of Railways
- Number in class: 18
- Numbers: 4901–4918
- Delivered: September 1960
- First run: 29 September 1960
- Last run: September 1964
- Preserved: 4903, 4906, 4916, 4918
- Disposition: 7 Operational, 5 Scrapped, 4 Preserved, 1 Stored, 1 Static

The 49 class is a class of diesel locomotives built by Clyde Engineering, Granville for the New South Wales Department of Railways between 1960 and 1964.

== History ==
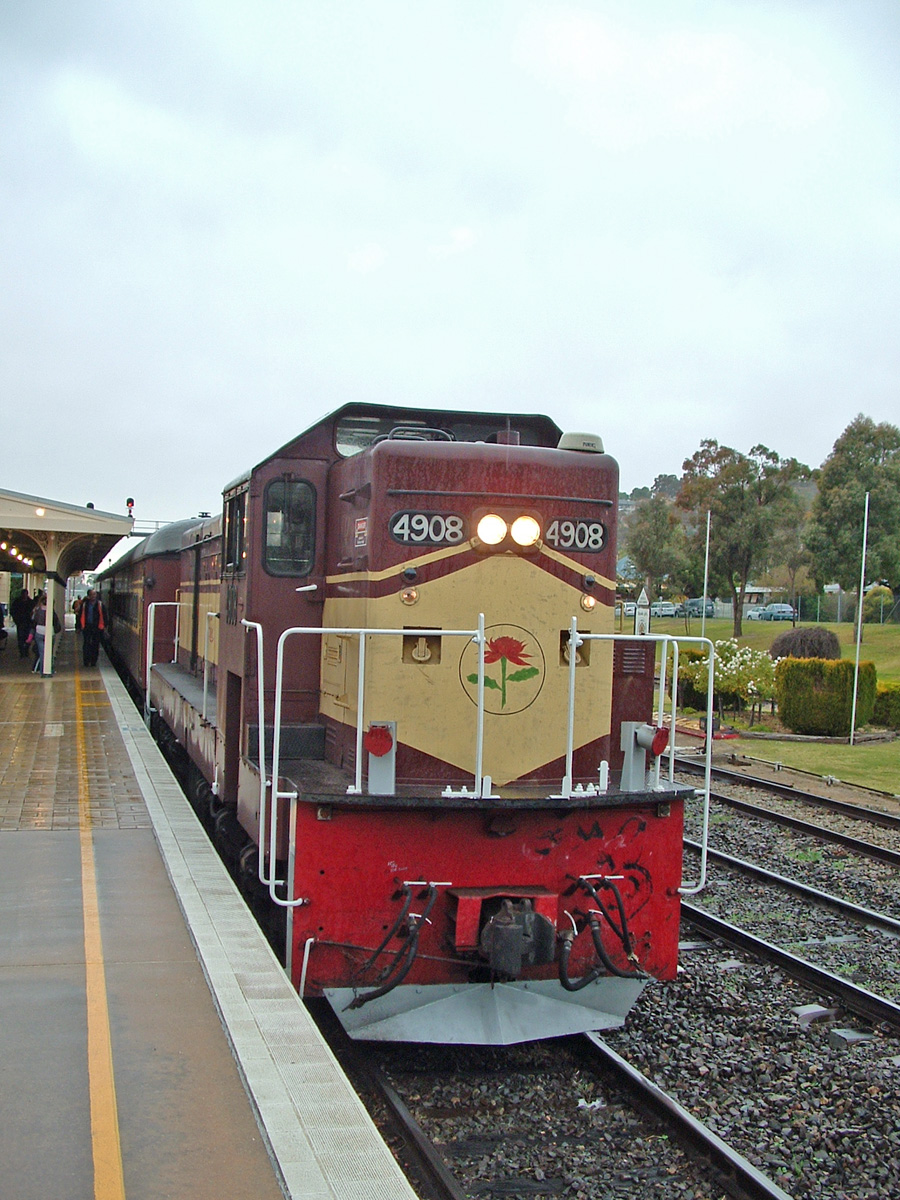
4908 when owned by 3801 Limited at Wagga Wagga in June 2006

The 49 class was ordered in three batches each of six locomotives. They entered service in the Western Region of New South Wales and hauled trains on all branchlines as well as mainlines west of Lithgow. They periodically travelled as far a field as Moree in the north-west and Cootamundra in the south-west.

Between July and November 1989, the whole class was transferred to Delec Locomotive Depot in Sydney. As well as metropolitan trip workings they were used on coal trains to Tahmoor on the Main South line. In January 1994, they began to operate on the Illawarra line to Bombo on ballast trains.

In June 1994, the Manildra Group leased 4907 from FreightCorp for use at its Gunnedah mill. Later in 1994, Manildra purchased 4907 along with 4913 and had them rebuilt by Clyde Engineering, Kelso with lower No.1 ends, the second being for use at their Manildra mill. To haul infrastructure trains in Victoria during the Melbourne-Adelaide railway standard gauge conversion project, 4903, 4912 and 4916 were leased to National Rail in late 1994.

In February 1995, the remaining examples still in service with FreightCorp were withdrawn. Most were returned to traffic later in 1995 before again being withdrawn in July 1997. In April 1998, 4910 was leased for seven months to Northern Rivers Railroad hauling services between Grafton and Murwillumbah.

By 1999, the 49s had begun to be sold with 3801 Limited, Chicago Freight Car Leasing Australia, Consolidated Rail Leasing, Patrick Portlink and Southern Shorthaul Railroad among those to have operated them, with many having had more than one owner post FreightCorp. Northern Rivers Railroad purchased a number, although none entered service. They were either resold or stripped for spares with the bogies off some used to regauge Queensland Railways 1502 class locomotives when converted to the 423 class.

Today, Southern Shorthaul Railroad own and operate 4904, 4908, 4910, 4911 and 4917, as well as Manildra Group's MM02 (ex- 4913) being used on some grain trains. 4910 has been out of service following a level crossing collision at Rockview in 2023, between Junee and Marrar, during which it derailed and tipped over. It is currently stored at SSR's North Bendigo Workshops pending possible repairs.

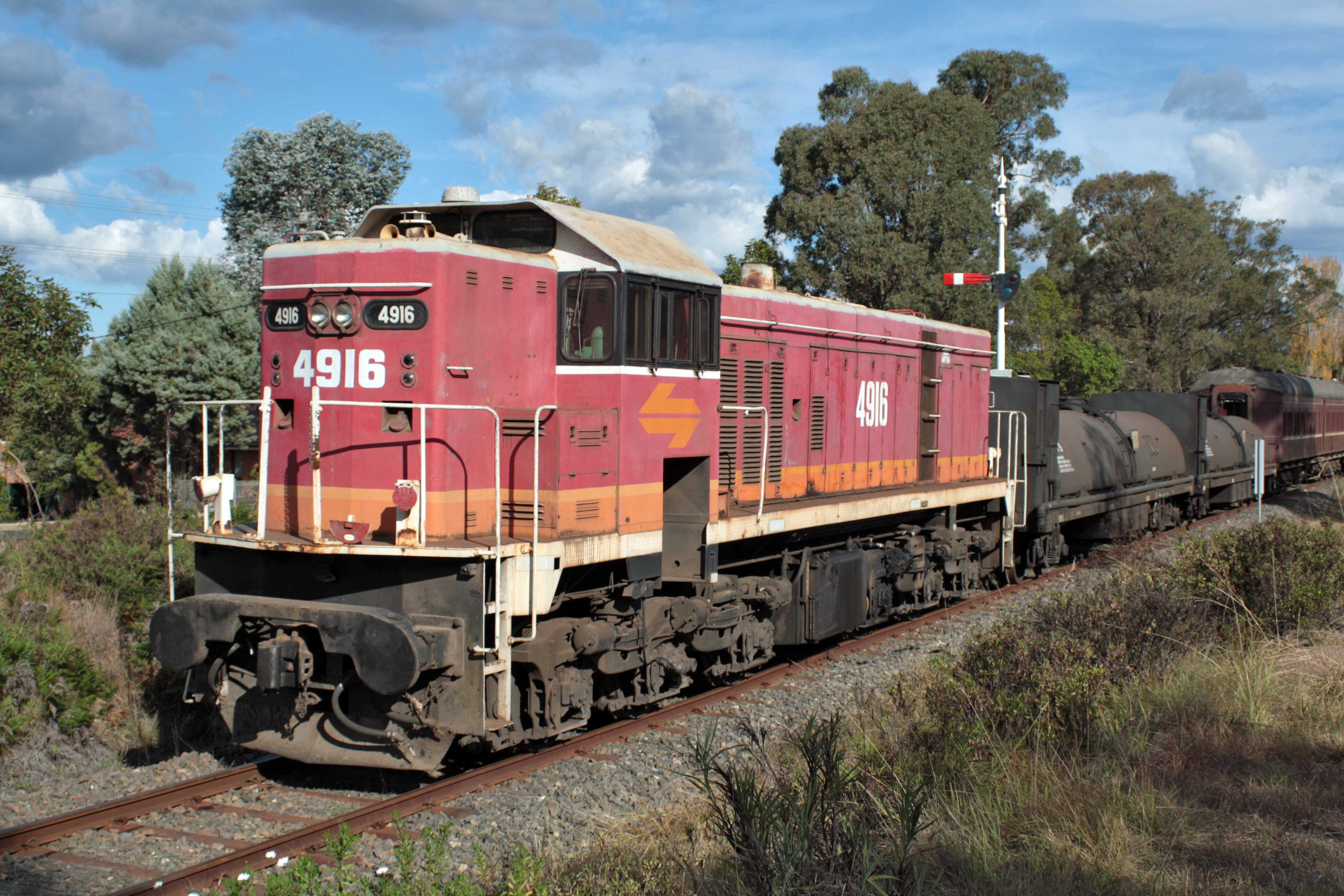
Locomotive 4916 at Thirlmere in 2010

4916 is owned by Transport Heritage NSW and can be regularly seen operating a variety of tourist trains around the state, or else stabled at the NSW Rail Museum, Thirlmere.

== Fleet status ==
Key:	In Service	Stored	Preserved	Converted	Under Overhaul	Scrapped

NSW No	Serial No	Entered service	Current/Last Owner	Livery	Status	Notes
4901	60-221	Sep 1960	Interail	Green & yellow	Scrapped	
4902	60-222	Oct 1960	Private owner	Green & yellow	Scrapped	Was previously stored at Seymour Railway Heritage Centre but scrapped in 2014
4903	60-223	Nov 1960	The Picnic Train	Patrick Portlink red, yellow & black	Preserved, operational	ex Patrick Portlink ex Interail
4904	60-224	Dec 1960	Southern Shorthaul Railroad	SSR yellow & black	Operational	ex Chicago Freight Car Leasing Australia
4905	60-225	Feb 1961	Traction Engineering	Traction Engineering orange	Static, Seymour Vic	
4906	60-226	Mar 1961	Lachlan Valley Railway	Patrick Portlink red, yellow & black	Preserved, operational	ex Patrick Portlink ex Interail
4907	62-257	Jun 1962	Manildra Group	Manildra blue & yellow	Operational	renumbered MM01
4908	62-258	Jul 1962	Southern Shorthaul Railroad	Greentrains green & yellow	Operational	ex Greentrains ex 3801 Limited
4909	62-259	Jul 1962	Interail	SRA candy	Scrapped	
4910	62-260	Aug 1962	Southern Shorthaul Railroad	SSR yellow & black	Under Overhaul	Rebuilding Bendigo Workshops ex Chicago Freight Car Leasing Australia KL81
4911	62-261	Oct 1962	Southern Shorthaul Railroad	CRL yellow, red & black	Operational	ex Manildra Group
4912	62-262	Nov 1962	Interail	SRA candy	Scrapped	
4913	64-342	Jun 1964	Manildra Group	Manildra blue & yellow	Operational	renumbered MM02
4914	64-343	Jun 1964	Interail	SRA candy	Scrapped	
4915	64-344	Jul 1964	State Rail Authority	PTC Indian Red	Scrapped	
4916	64-345	Aug 1964	Transport Heritage NSW	Tuscan	Preserved, operational	
4917	64-346	Aug 1964	Southern Shorthaul Railroad	SSR yellow & black	Operational	ex Chicago Freight Car Leasing Australia KL82
4918	64-347	Sep 1964	Dorrigo Steam Railway & Museum	Tuscan	Preserved, operational	
