= New South Wales 421 class locomotive =

Class of Australian diesel-electric locomotives

New South Wales 421 Class
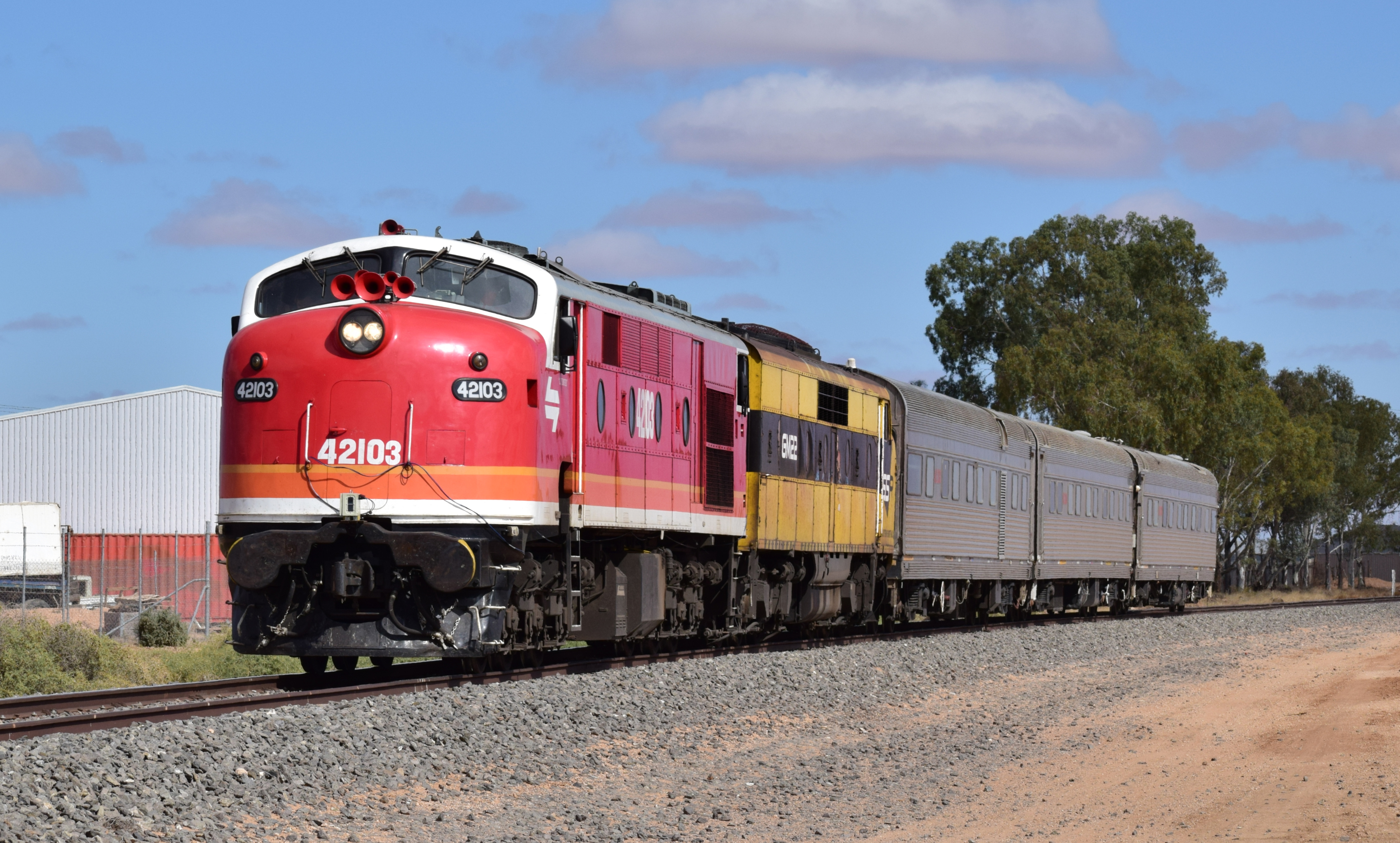
- 42103 and GM22 lead the AK cars from Yelta to Ouyen at Mildura. This was the first visit of a 421 class, or indeed any 'Candy' liveried locomotive to Mildura.
Type and origin
- Power type: Diesel-electric
- Builder: Clyde Engineering, Granville
- Serial number: 65-468, 66-469 to 66-477
- Model: EMD AJ16C
- Build date: 1965–1966
- Total produced: 10
Specifications
- Configuration
  - UIC: Co-Co
- Gauge: 4 ft 8 1/2 in (1,435 mm) standard gauge
- Wheel diameter: 40 in (1,016 mm)
- Length: Over headstocks: 57 ft 10 in (17.63 m), Over coupler pulling faces: 62 ft 0 3/4 in (18.92 m)
- Width: 9 ft 8 in (2.95 m)
- Height: 13 ft 10 1/2 in (4.23 m)
- Axle load: 18 long tons 0 cwt (40,300 lb or 18.3 t)
- Loco weight: 108 long tons 0 cwt (241,900 lb or 109.7 t)
- Fuel type: Diesel fuel
- Fuel capacity: 1,200 imp gal (5,500 L; 1,400 US gal)
- Lubricant cap.: 166 imp gal (750 L; 199 US gal)
- Coolant cap.: 175 imp gal (800 L; 210 US gal)
- Sandbox cap.: 12 cu ft (0.34 m^{3})
- Prime mover: EMD 16-567C
- RPM range: 275–835
- Engine type: Two-stroke V16 diesel
- Aspiration: Roots blower
- Generator: EMD D32F
- Traction motors: 6 x EMD D67
- Cylinders: 16
- Cylinder size: 8.5 in × 10 in (216 mm × 254 mm)
Performance figures
- Maximum speed: 70 mph (110 km/h)
- Power output: Gross: 1,810 hp (1,350 kW), For traction: 1,800 hp (1,340 kW)
- Tractive effort: Continuous: 70,900 lbf (315.38 kN) at 6.9 mph (11.1 km/h)
Career
- Operators: The Heritage Locomotive Company; Dorrigo Steam Railway & Museum; Private Owner
- Number in class: 10
- Numbers: 42101–42110
- Nicknames: Rocking Horses
- Delivered: 1965
- First run: December 1965
- Last run: July 1966
- Preserved: 42101, 42102, 42103, 42105
- Current owner: The Heritage Locomotive Company; Dorrigo Steam Railway & Museum; Private Owner
- Disposition: 1 stored, 4 preserved, 5 scrapped

The 421 class are a class of diesel locomotives built by Clyde Engineering, Granville for the Department of Railways New South Wales in 1965/66. These mainline locomotives were a follow on from the 42 class. The 421s retained the classic bulldog nose as with the other Clyde built GM and S locomotives at one end, but featured a flat-cab at the other end. In this respect, they are unique amongst bulldog nose locomotives in the world.

== History ==
The 421 class initially entered service on the Main South line before being transferred to Bathurst in 1970 to operate services on the Main Western line between Lithgow and Broken Hill including the new Indian Pacific service. However, due to their poor ride quality, they were returned to the Main South. In 1982, they were briefly used on through services to Melbourne.

All 10 were withdrawn from service in December 1986 and January 1987 and put in store at Junee Locomotive Depot, even though some had only recently been overhauled. In June 1989, two were moved to Cardiff Locomotive Workshops. One was resurrected from July 1989 until January 1990 before most were offered for sale in 1990.

Four locomotives were purchased by Northern Rivers Railroad. After undergoing some restoration work at Junee in October 1996, they worked to their new base at Casino where the work was completed ready for the commencement of operations in October 1997. Northern Rivers Railroad used them to haul the Ritz Rail tourist rail service from Casino to Murwillumbah on the Murwillumbah line and various freight and infrastructure trains on the North Coast line as a sub-contractor to FreightCorp. Northern Rivers Railroad purchased 42106 from a private owner, and moved it from storage at the New South Wales Rail Transport Museum, Thirlmere to Casino in September 1998.

Five have been preserved. In December 2009, 42101 was transferred from the Goulburn Rail Heritage Centre to Eveleigh Railway Workshops for restoration by 3801 Limited. After being fitted with refurbished traction motors at Chullora Railway Workshops in October 2011, it returned to Eveleigh to be restored back to operational condition in March 2012. It undertook its first trials on Cowan Bank on the evening of 25 October 2014 and was repainted in its original Indian red livery by UGL Rail, Auburn in January 2015.

In January 2011, 42102 moved from storage on Kooragang Island to the Dorrigo Steam Railway & Museum.

In late 2017, 42103 and 42105 were bought by a private owner for preservation. 42103 was first to be reactivated and made its first trip to Rothbury in December 2017. 42103's first tour after reactivation was working Lachlan Valley Railway's Blue Seude Express to Parkes with 4204 and 4716 in January 2018. Since then, it worked the Australia Day Flyer to Kiama and has been seen running light engine in numerous locations. It has now been affectionately named "Chumster". 42105 was officially re-launched into service in November 2023 after receiving many years of work in Goulburn. It has been painted into a modified Northern Rivers Railroad livery with Chumrail logos in place of the original NRR logos. The locomotive has been named "Chumsayer" as a nod to the person that did most of the work on it.

Locomotive 42107 was purchased by a private owner in April 2021 after a period of time spent in storage after Aurizon parked the engine up in early 2018. After reactivation the locomotive was painted at the Hunter Valley Workshops site at Rothbury into the Reverse livery previously only worn by class member 42104.

== Fleet Status ==
Key:	In Service	Stored	Preserved	Converted	Under Overhaul	Scrapped

NSW No	Serial No	Entered service	Current/Last Owner	Livery	Status
42101	65-468	22 Dec 1965	The Heritage Locomotive Company; Operated by East Coast Heritage Rail	Indian Red	Preserved, Operational
42102	66-469	24 Jan 1966	Dorrigo Steam Railway & Museum	SRA Candy	Stored
42103	66-470	15 Feb 1966	Chumrail	SRA Candy	Preserved, Operational
42104	66-471	28 Feb 1966	State Rail Authority	PTC Reverse	Scrapped
42105	66-472	15 Mar 1966	Chumrail	NRR Rainbow	Preserved, Operational
42106	66-473	14 Apr 1966	CFCLA	Undercoat	Scrapped
42107	66-474	12 May 1966	Private owner	Reverse	Preserved, Operational
42108	66-475	3 May 1966	State Rail Authority	SRA Candy	Scrapped
42109	66-476	6 Jul 1966	CFCLA	NRR Rainbow	Scrapped
42110	66-477	25 Jul 1966	State Rail Authority	Austerity Red	Scrapped
