= Interail =

Former Australian freight rail operator

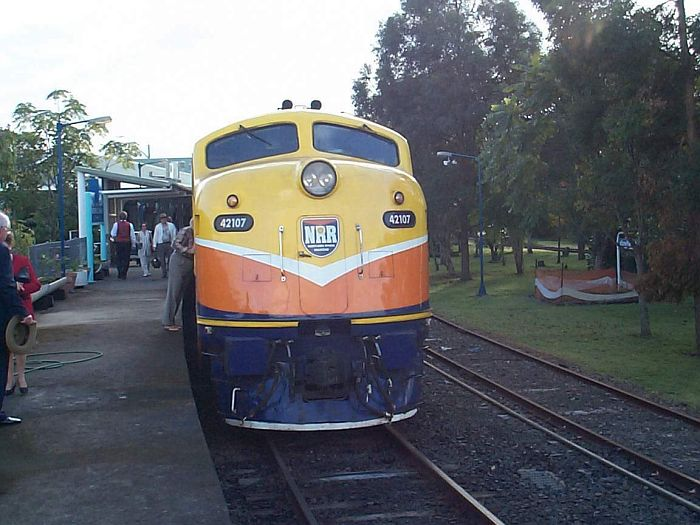
- 42107 at Murwillumbah station
- Industry: Railway operator
- Founded: 1990
- Defunct: 30 June 2011
- Headquarters: Casino
- Parent: QR National
- Website: www.interail.com.au

Interail was an Australian rail freight operator owned by QR National. In June 2011 it ceased trading as a separate brand, and became part of QR National (now known as Aurizon).

== Northern Rivers Railroad ==
Northern Rivers Railroad was established in 1990 with the intention of running tourist trains on the Casino to Murwillumbah line in northern New South Wales. Four 421 class locomotives were purchased in 1990 and along with some former South Australian Railways steel and State Rail Authority carriages were restored to operational condition at Junee Locomotive Depot before moving to Casino in October 1996.

On 22 September 1997, Northern Rivers Railroad commenced operating cement and flyash trains from Grafton to Casino and Murwillumbah under sub-contract to FreightCorp. A 49 class locomotive was hired from FreightCorp for a few months in 1998.

In May 1999, a tourist service started operating the Ritz Rail tourist train between Murwillumbah and Lismore. It also ran to other destinations including Brisbane. In 1999, two 422 class locomotives were purchased from FreightCorp. In 2000 Northern Rivers Railroad operated some infrastructure trains in the Hunter Valley.

== Sale to QR National ==
In March 2002, Northern Rivers Railroad was purchased by Queensland Rail and rebranded Interail, fulfilling a long-held ambition of to expand beyond its state borders. The tourist train was not included.

The first contract won by Interail was hauling infrastructure trains on the North Coast line of New South Wales for Rail Infrastructure Corporation. It was followed by a coal haulage contract from Duralie Colliery to Stratford Mine from March 2003, then haulage of containers between Casino and Brisbane from May 2003. Another coal contract in the Hunter Valley was won in late 2003 for the haulage of coal from Newstan Colliery, Fassifern to Vales Point Power Station.

In 2004. Interail began running Brisbane to Melbourne and Sydney to Melbourne intermodal services, in part due to the linehaul needs of CRT Group.

To operate these extra services two Queensland Railways 1502 class were rebuilt in 2002 as 423s using standard gauge bogies recovered from 49 class locomotives. A further four followed in 2004/05. Two former Westrail L class locomotives were acquired from Rail Technical Support Group in 2004. To operate the intermodal services two X class and two G class locomotives were transferred from Freight Australia as part of a deal requiring CRT Group to receive 10,000 hp (7,500 kW) of locomotive power should Freight Australia be sold to a competitor of CRT, which it was when sold to Pacific National. Locomotives were also often hired from Chicago Freight Car Leasing Australia.

Following the formation of QR National in 2004/05, all new business was done under this brand. The ex Freight Australia locomotives carried QR National branding from 2005 as did the last two 423s. In June 2011 it ceased trading as a separate brand, and became part of QR National.
