= Consolidated Rail Leasing =

Australian locomotive and rolling stock leasing company

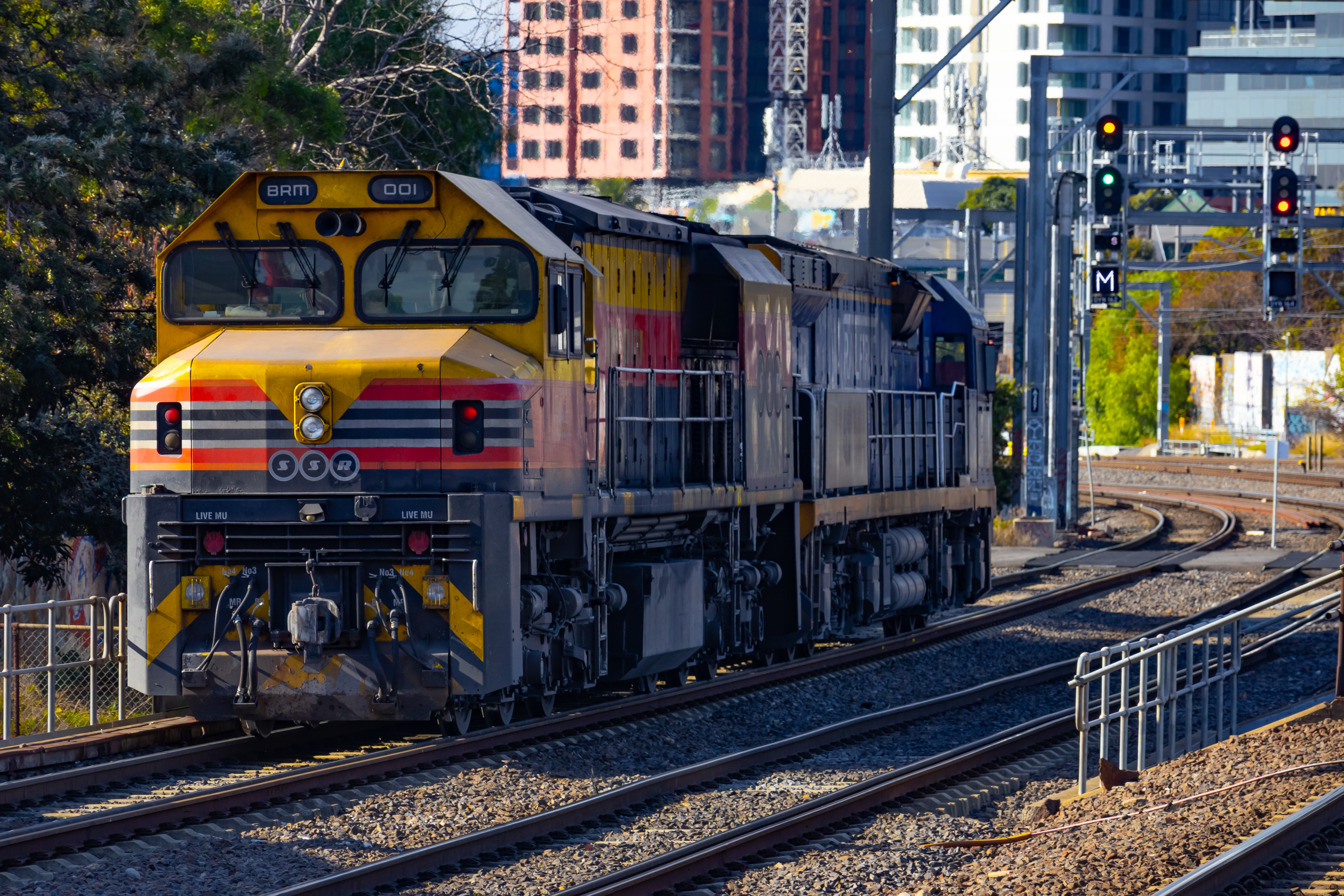
- Former CRL locomotive at Middle Footscray
- Type: Subsidiary
- Industry: Rail transport
- Founded: 2012
- Defunct: 2021
- Headquarters: Melbourne, Australia
- Area served: New South Wales; Victoria
- Services: Rolling stock leasing
- Parent: Southern Shorthaul Railroad
- Website: www.crleasing.com.au

Consolidated Rail Leasing was an Australian locomotive and rolling stock leasing company. It was formed in 2012 as BRM Leasing, a subsidiary of Southern Shorthaul Railroad.

In February 2013, the operational fleet consisted of 4911, BRM001 and BRM002 which were manufactured at Southern Shorthaul Railroad's North Bendigo workshop in 2012/13. Both spent all of their time in service with other Southern Shorthaul Railroad locomotives.

As part of its early operations, the company had former Victorian Railways locomotive B75 overhauled at North Bendigo, along with five UGL Rail C44aci units, and had an unspecified number of NRE E-3000E3B locomotives on order.

On 28 June 2014, was B75 returned to service after being overhauled by Southern Shorthaul Railroad. Along with 4911 and the two BRM locomotives, it was one of the four locomotives in the Consolidated Rail Leasing fleet.

In September 2021, a voluntary application was made to deregister Consolidated Rail Leasing. After the company ceased trading, its locomotives and wagons became part of the Southern Shorthaul Railroad fleet.
