= WAGR L class (diesel) =

Class of Australian diesel-electric locomotives (EMD GT26C)

Western Australian Government Railways L Class
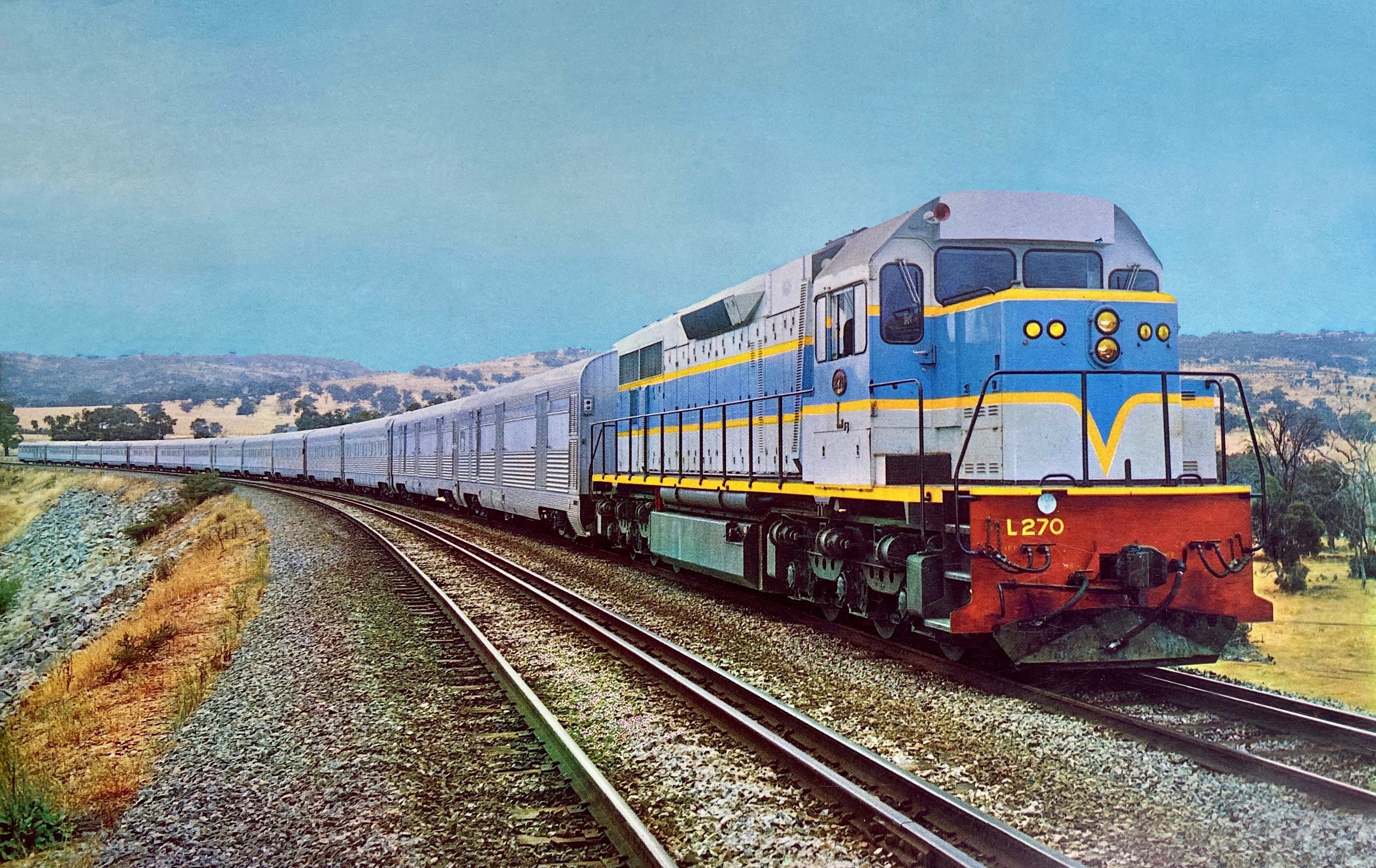
- L270 in a promotional photo for the Indian Pacific, February 1970
Type and origin
- Power type: Diesel-electric
- Builder: Clyde Engineering, Granville (L251–L273, R.1001–R.1002); Commonwealth Engineering (Subcontract), Rocklea (L274–L275)
- Serial number: 67-541–68-557, 68-617–69-622, 72-752–72-753, 73-779–73-780
- Model: EMD GT26C
- Build date: 1967–1969, 1972–1973
- Total produced: 27
- Rebuilder: NREC, Whyalla, Progress Rail, Port Augusta
Specifications
- Configuration
  - AAR: C-C
  - UIC: Co′Co′
- Gauge: 1,435 mm (4 ft 8 1/2 in) standard gauge
- Bogies: Clyde Hi-Ad
- Wheel diameter: 1,016 mm (40.0 in)
- Length: 20.218 m (66 ft 4.0 in)
- Width: 2.946 m (9 ft 8.0 in)
- Height: 4.228 m (13 ft 10.5 in)
- Axle load: 22.5 t (22.1 long tons; 24.8 short tons)
- Loco weight: 137 t (135 long tons; 151 short tons)
- Fuel type: Diesel
- Prime mover: EMD 16-645E3
- RPM range: 315–900
- Engine type: V16
- Aspiration: Turbocharged
- Alternator: EMD AR10A4
- Traction motors: EMD D77
- Cylinders: 16
- Transmission: Diesel-electric
Performance figures
- Maximum speed: 137 km/h (85 mph)
- Power output: Gross: 2,460 kW (3,300 hp); Traction: 2,240 kW (3,000 hp)
- Tractive effort: 337.2 kN (75,800 lbf)
Career
- Operators: Aurizon; Southern Shorthaul Railroad
- Number in class: 27
- Delivered: 27 October 1967
- First run: 30 October 1967
- Last run: 15 October 1973
- Current owner: Aurizon; Southern Shorthaul Railroad
- Disposition: 6 in service, 13 stored, 8 scrapped

The L Class are a class of diesel locomotives built by Clyde Engineering, Granville and Commonwealth Engineering (subcontracted by Clyde), Rocklea for the Western Australian Government Railways between 1967 and 1973.

== History ==
With the 657-kilometre (408 mi) Eastern Goldfields Railway between Perth and Kalgoorlie being converted to standard gauge, the Western Australian Government Railways started to take delivery of 23 Electro Motive Diesel GT26C locomotives from Clyde Engineering in October 1967. The design was based on the EMD SD40 reduced in height to fit within the Australian loading gauge. They were the first Australian locomotives to use a turbocharged EMD engine. At the time they were comfortably the largest and heaviest diesel locomotive operated by a government operator.

All were delivered from Sydney via Melbourne and Adelaide, necessitating them being placed on broad gauge bogies for the journey between Dynon and Port Pirie.

They entered service hauling iron ore trains from Koolyanobbing to Kwinana and the Indian Pacific. However they were quickly removed from passenger trains after it was realised the damage they could cause to the track at higher speeds.

In January 1972, Comalco purchased two locomotives of the same design for use on its 19.5-kilometre (12.1 mi) line at its bauxite mine in Weipa. These were built without dynamic brakes but had an extra 11 tonnes (11 long tons; 12 short tons) of ballast for increased adhesion. In 1973, the Western Australian Government Railways took delivery of a further two units, funded by Western Mining Corporation as part of the building of a nickel mine at Mount Windarra. The Comalco locomotives were built by Clyde Engineering's Granville factory in 1971/72, and the WMC funded locomotives were built under subcontract by Commonwealth Engineering at their Rocklea plant after Granville had closed in 1973.

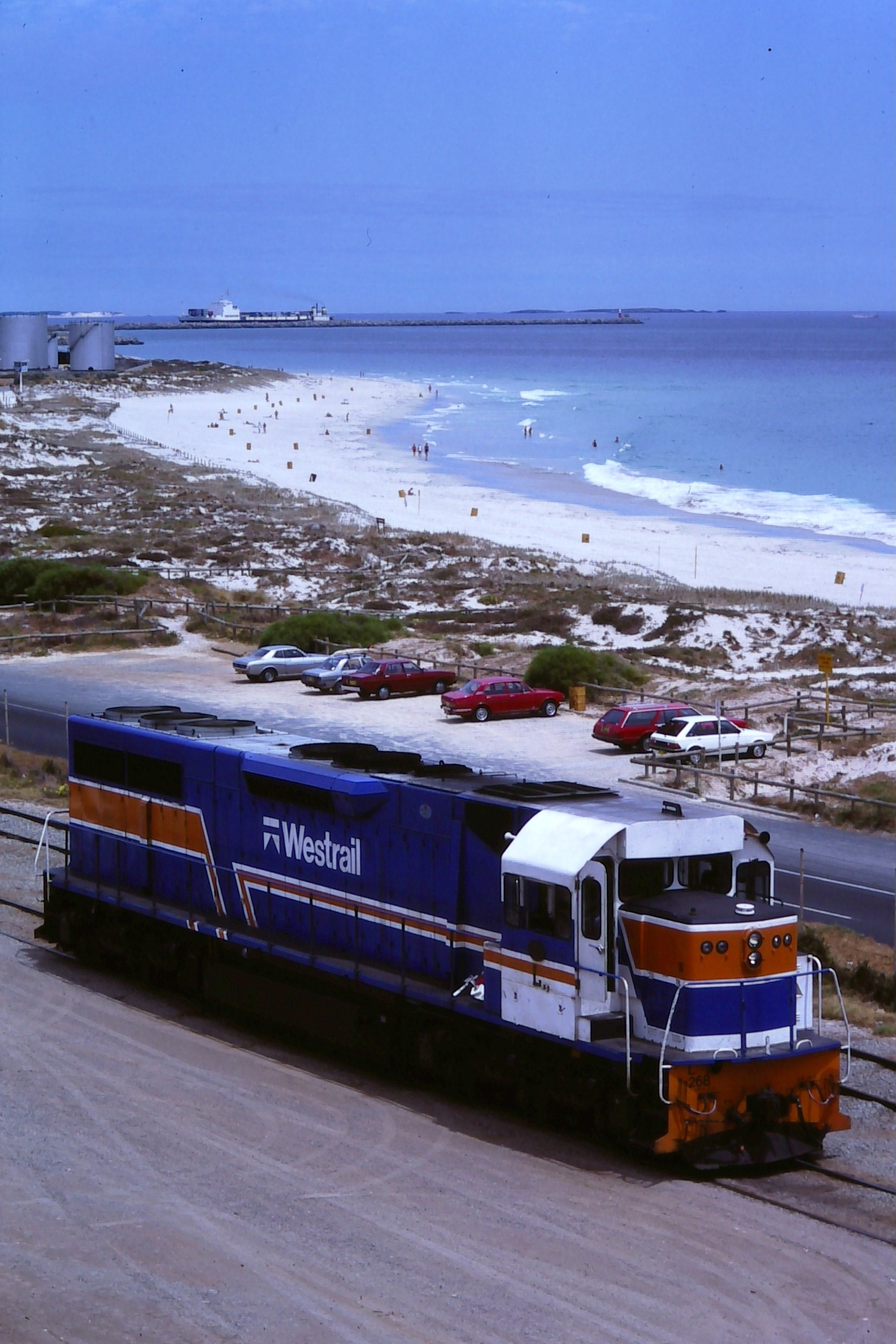
L268, in a one-off blue Westrail livery, at Leighton Marshalling Yard

In 1983, three were leased to V/Line to haul services on the standard gauge Melbourne to Albury line. One even operated through to Sydney in May 1984.

In 1994, following the purchase of GML10, Comalco's R1.001 was sent to Clyde Engineering, Kelso for overhaul. Upon its return in August 1994, R1.002 was sold to Westrail and placed in service as Lw276.

Following the delivery of the Q Class locomotives in 1997, many were withdrawn with those remaining in service relegated to trailing unit status.

In July 1998, seven were sold to Australian Transport Network. After being overhauled by National Railway Equipment Company, Whyalla, four were placed in service by ATN Access hauling grain trains in southern New South Wales and Victoria. Three were included in the sale of Australian Transport Network to Pacific National in February 2004 while the fourth along with the three unused examples along with one of the operational units were sold to Rail Technical Services, Dynon who resold them to QR National subsidiaries Interail and Australian Railroad Group for use in New South Wales.

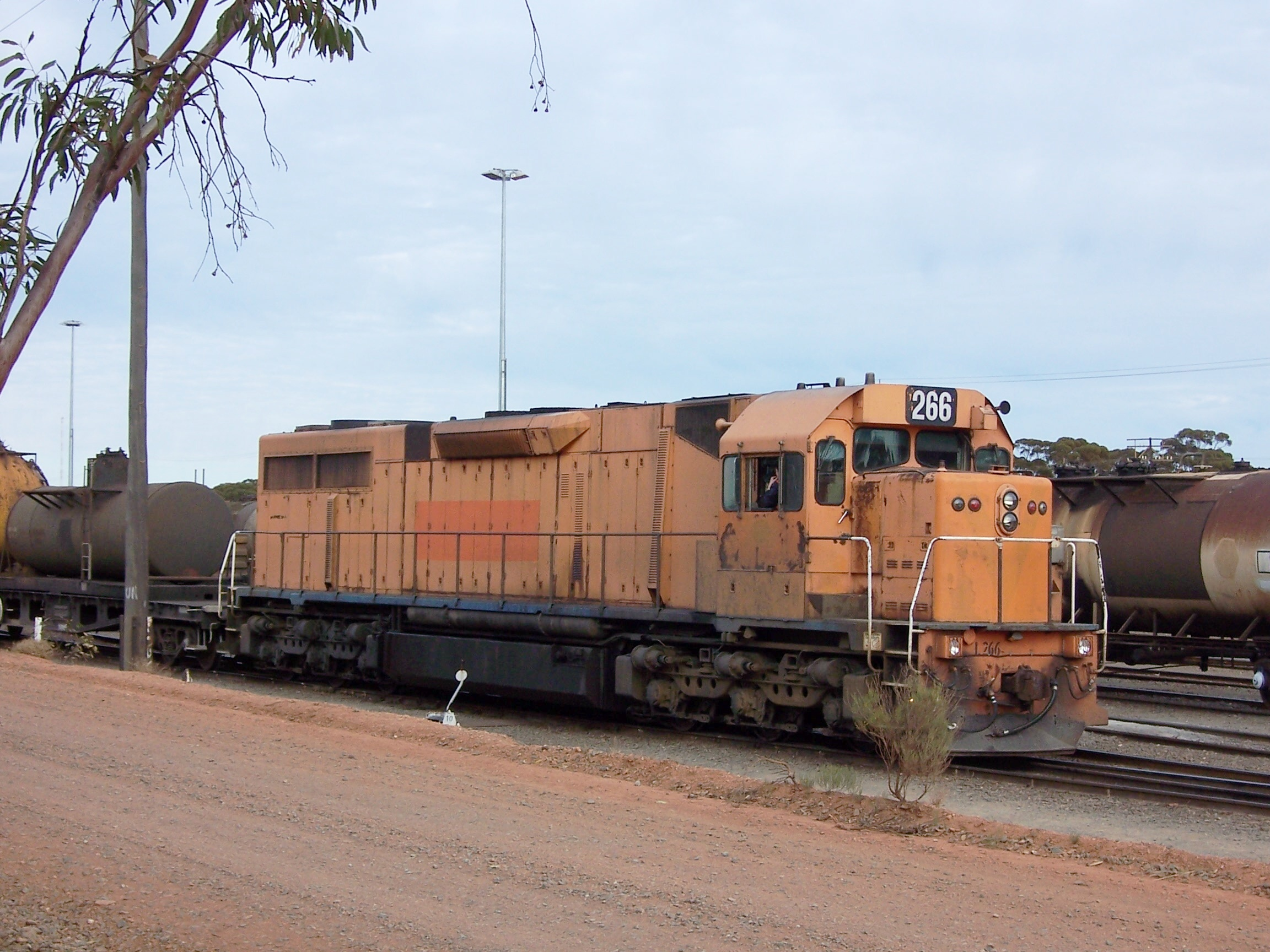
L266 at Kalgoorlie in January 2005

The remainder were included in the sale of Westrail to Australian Railroad Group in December 2000. All were included in the sale of Australian Railroad Group's Western Australian operations to QR National in June 2006. After being stored for some years, the Pacific National units were scrapped in 2015.

All of the locomotives under the control of the Australian Railroad Group have been renumbered as the 3100 class. Those fitted with Q-Tron traction control have had the "LQ" prefix applied, those with ZTR traction control were called "LZ". Some were transferred to New South Wales to haul trains from the Manildra Group's flour mills at Gunnedah, Manildra and Narrandera to Bomaderry from 2003 until 2008.

In 2011, Comalco sold R1.001 to Australian Locolease who placed it in service as L277 and leased it to El Zorro to operate grain trains in Victoria. After several years of storage and irregular use, L277 was sold to Southern Shorthaul Railroad in 2020 and was transferred to Cootamundra for reactivation work, which was completed in September 2020.

In 2018, all Aurizon owned units were placed into long-term storage, facing an uncertain future. LZ3111 hauled three sister units as well as flatbed and well wagons to Avon Yard on 12 January that year before returning light engine back to Forrestfield Marshalling Yard.

In July 2021, Aurizon reactivated LZ3119 and LZ3120 for use on grain trains in New South Wales. After spending a year and a half there, LZ3120 was transferred back to Western Australia in December 2022. Nearly a month prior to this, LZ3109 and LZ3114 were shipped by road to Progress Rail's workshops in Port Augusta for rebuilding and return to service.

On 19 July 2023, LZ3111 was reactivated and ran light engine to Avon Yard to take up shunting duties there. It was relocated to Aurizon's new Forrestfield intermodal terminal on 28 December the same year, also for shunting duties.

As of 2 November 2024, LZ3119 (formerly L253) is located at Nowra under lease to the Manildra Group, where it will serve as the onsite shunt locomotive at their manufacturing plant in Bomaderry.

== Status Table ==
Key:	In Service	Stored	Preserved	Converted	Under Overhaul	Scrapped

Serial number	Entered service	Original Road Number	Renumbered As	Name	Current/Last Owner	Livery	Status
67-541	30 October 1967	L251	-	Thunderbird 1	Pacific National	PN Blue & Yellow	Scrapped, 5 May 2015 (Werris Creek)
67-542	20 November 1967	L252	LZ3101	Kurra Kurraka	Aurizon	QR National Pineapple	Scrapped by accident in June 2016 (Casino)
67-543	14 December 1967	L253	LZ3119	-	Aurizon	ARG Orange w/ Aurizon Logo Patches	Reactivated July 2021. Hired to SSR for Manildra Group grain contract 10/24.
67-544	5 January 1968	L254	-	Enterprise NCC 1701	Pacific National	ATN Access Burgundy & Yellow	Scrapped after an engine fire, 4 November 2016 (Cardiff Locomotive Workshops)
67-545	8 February 1968	L255	LZ3105	-	Aurizon	G&W Orange & Black w/ ARG Logos	Stored, October 2014 (Avon Yard)
67-546	8 March 1968	L256	LZ3106	-	Aurizon	QR National Pineapple	Stored, 12 January 2018 (Avon Yard)
68-547	14 March 1968	L257	3102	Wagiman	J&P Metals	G&W Orange & Black w/ ARG Logos	Scrapped, 30 October 2021
68-548	28 March 1968	L258	LZ3107	-	Aurizon	G&W Orange & Black w/ ARG Logos	Stored, January 2018 (Forrestfield)
68-549	19 April 1968	L259	LZ3103	Aboriginal Stockman	Aurizon	Aurizon Pineapple	Stored (Avon Yard)
68-550	24 May 1968	L260	L3108	-	Aurizon	Westrail Yellow w/ Patches	Stored, October 2014 (Avon Yard)
68-551	14 August 1968	L261	LZ3109	-	Aurizon	Aurizon Bulk Yellow	Rebuilt by Progress Rail, Port Augusta
68-552	23 August 1968	L262	L3110	-	Aurizon	G&W Orange & Black w/ ARG Logos	Stored (Forrestfield)
68-553	11 October 1968	L263	LZ3111	-	Aurizon	G&W Orange & Black w/ ARG Logos	Reactivated in 2023 for shunting duties
68-554	16 October 1968	L264	LZ3112	-	Aurizon	ARG Mustard & Burgundy	Stored, 12 January 2018 (Avon Yard)
68-555	18 October 1968	L265	LQ3121	Shoalhaven	Aurizon	ARG Mustard & Burgundy	Stored (Avon Yard)
68-556	25 October 1968	L266	L3113	-	Aurizon	Westrail Orange & Blue Phase 2	Stored (Avon Yard)
68-557	28 November 1968	L267	LZ3114	-	Aurizon	Aurizon Bulk Yellow	Rebuilt by Progress Rail, Port Augusta, Leased to SSR
68-617	18 December 1968	L268	L3115	-	Aurizon	Westrail Yellow w/ ARG logos	Stored (Avon Yard)
68-618	17 January 1969	L269	-	-	Westrail	Westrail Orange & Blue Phase 1	Involved in a crossing accident in Esperance on 30 May 1995. Scrapped, February 1996
68-619	7 March 1969	L270	-	Red Dwarf	Pacific National	PN Blue & Yellow	Scrapped, 5 May 2015 (Werris Creek)
69-620	12 April 1969	L271	LQ3122	John Douglas Kerr	Aurizon	Interail Rainbow w/ Aurizon Logo Patches	Scrapped by accident in June 2016 (Casino)
69-621	20 May 1969	L272	L3116	-	Aurizon	Westrail Orange & Blue Phase 2 w/ Patches	Stored (Avon Yard)
69-622	13 June 1969	L273	LZ3104	Purnu	Aurizon	G&W Orange & Black w/ ARG Logos	Scrapped by accident in June 2016 (Casino)
72-752	March 1972	R1.001	L277	Phoenix/Hustle Muscle	Southern Shorthaul Railroad	Comalco Yellow & Orange w/ SSR Logos	Reactivated, September 2020
72-753	June 1972	R1.002	Lw276, LZ3120	-	Aurizon	ARG Orange w/ Aurizon Logo Patches	Reactivated for NSW grain traffic in July 2021 then returned to WA in December 2022
73-779	26 September 1973	L274	LZ3117	-	Aurizon	G&W Orange & Black w/ ARG Logos	Stored, 12 January 2018 (Avon Yard)
73-780	15 October 1973	L275	L3118	-	Aurizon	Westrail Orange & Blue Phase 2 w/ ARG Logos	Stored, October 2014 (Avon Yard)
