= EMD GT26 Series =

American designed locomotives

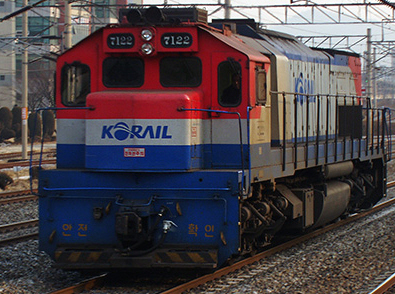
- KORAIL EMD GT26CW
Type and origin
- Power type: Diesel–electric
- Builder: Various licencees from Electro-Motive Division (see models below)
- Model: GT26CW, GT26CWP, GT26CW-2, GT26CW-2A, GT26CW-2B, GT26HCW-2, GT26MC, GT26CU-2, GT26CU-MP, GT36CW, GT36HCW, GT36CU-MP
- Build date: October 1967 - 2017
- Total produced: 1,387
Specifications
- Configuration
  - AAR: C-C
  - UIC: Co′Co′
  - Commonwealth: Co-Co
- Gauge: 4 ft 8 1/2 in (1,435 mm) or 3 ft 6 in (1,067 mm) or 1,000 mm (3 ft 3 3/8 in)
- Trucks: 6-Wheel
- Wheel diameter: 40 in (1,000 mm)
- Minimum curve: 24°
- Wheelbase: 11 ft 11 in (3,630 mm) between axles in each truck
- Pivot centres: 41 ft 0 in (12,500 mm) between truck centers
- Length
  - Over couplers: 64 ft 0 in (19,510 mm)
- Width: 9 ft 3 in (2,820 mm)) over the grabirons
- Height: 12 ft 5.65 in (3,801.1 mm)
- Loco weight: 105.51 t (103.84 long tons; 116.30 short tons)
- Fuel type: Diesel
- Fuel capacity: 1,600–3,200 US gal (6,100–12,100 L; 1,300–2,700 imp gal)
- Lubricant cap.: 243 US gal (920 L; 202 imp gal)
- Coolant cap.: 295 US gal (1,120 L; 246 imp gal)
- Sandbox cap.: 9 ft^{3} (250 L)
- Prime mover: EMD 16-645E, 16-645E3B, 16-645E3C & 16-645F3 (2 Stroke V Engine design)
- RPM
  - RPM idle: 316
  - Maximum RPM: 904
- Engine type: V16 diesel engine
- Aspiration: Turbocharged
- Alternator: GM D18
- Generator: Main: GM - AR6; Auxiliary: Delco A8102
- Traction motors: GM - D77 (6)
- Cylinders: 16
- Cylinder size: 9.02 in (229 mm) x 10 in (250 mm)
- Gear ratio: 62:15
- MU working: Yes
- Train heating: Vapor Clarkson Boiler #4625 (@ 2,500 lbf (1,100 kgf)/hr)
- Train brakes: Westinghouse 24RL (Air Brake)
Performance figures
- Maximum speed: 65–93 mph (105–150 km/h)
- Power output: 2,700–3,300 hp (2,000–2,500 kW)
- Tractive effort
  - Starting: 46,750 lbf (21,210 kgf) @ 25%
  - Continuous: 43,120 lbf (19,560 kgf) @ 12 mph (19 km/h)
Career
- Operators: Various
- Nicknames: "Karavela" (Yugoslavia) "특대 :(The Great Giant)" (South Korea)
- Locale: Algeria, Australia, Iran, Israel, Morocco, Nigeria, Pakistan, Peru, South Africa, South Korea, Sudan, Turkey, Yugoslavia and Zimbabwe.

The EMD GT26 Locomotive Series made their debut in 1967 after the rise in popularity of the American EMD SD40. Designed to meet most First World, Second World and Third World countries, the GT26 Series were now equipped with a turbocharged high horsepower EMD 645 Series engine as well as six axle HT-C trucks to provide better traction effort at slow speeds. Based on customer input, the GT26 Series would be defined by various designations that suit the customer's railway operations.

The standard suffix after the GT26 designation was the use of six-axle trucks (C); following the C designation, the customer had the option to purchase specific traction motors to fit Narrow Gauge (U) or Broad Gauge (W) rails. It was also around the mid 1970s that customers began to purchase EMD Dash 2 electronics to simplify maintenance.

The GT26 designation can freely apply to the designs of any EMD export model or a licensee of EMD as long as the electrical and mechanical gear were left unaltered.

== Overview ==
With the introduction of the EMD 645 Series engine now replacing the EMD 567 Series engine in 1967, the locomotive model designation number changed by adding 10 to a similar predecessor model (example: the G12 - 567 engined, now became the G22 - 645 engined). To meet customer demands for a high-horsepower model, EMD created the G16: A longer, six-axle version of the EMD G12 equipped with Flexicoil Type-C trucks and a larger engine with increased horsepower. A turbocharged variation also was available, designating the model as EMD GT16. While most GT26s shared a similar body style, Australian versions notably have significant visual differences.

However, as the EMD 645 Series engine was now in production, the G16 now became the GT26 equipped with a turbocharger. EMD applied the six axle (C) designation to further separate the model from any four-axle models similarly produced.

Several models were introduced:

- GT26CW
- GT26CWP
- GT26CW-2
- GT26CW-2A
- GT26CW-2B
- GT26HCW-2
- GT26MC
- GT26CU-2
- GT26CU-MP
- GT36CU-MP
- GT36CW
- GT36HCW

== GT26CW/CWP ==
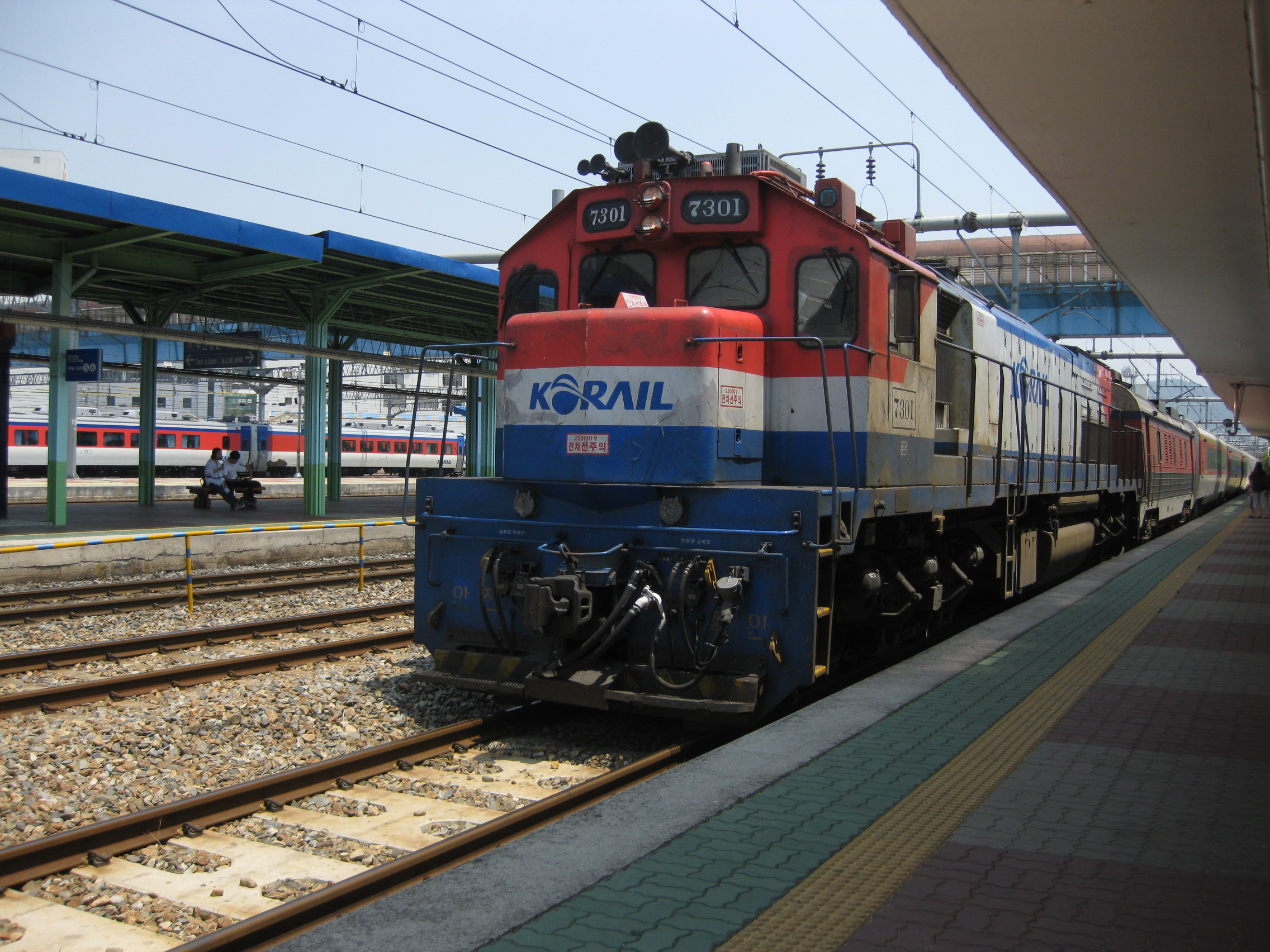
KORAIL 7301

The EMD GT26CW first appeared in 1967. Unlike its turbocharged predecessor the GT16, the GT26CW was identified with a W suffix which indicated that this model had traction motors that could fit the locomotive's axles from Indian gauge to Irish Gauge rails; thus Wide would be the understood term for the traction motors.

Production spanned from October 1967 to October 1988.

EMD GT26CW/CWP Orders
Builder	Country	Railroad	Quantity	Road numbers	Notes
Clyde Engineering	Australia	Western Australian Government Railways Comalco	27	L251 - L275, R1001 - R1002	See also WAGR L class (diesel)
Clyde Engineering	Australia	Victorian Railways	10	C501-C510	See also Victorian Railways C class (diesel)
Electro-Motive Division & General Motors Diesel Division	Algeria	Société Nationale des Transports Ferroviaires	94	060DD1 – 060DD29, 060DF1 – 060DF25, 060DG1 – 060DG15 060DL1-060DL25	DD & DF Series built by EMD; DG Series built by GMDD with high short hoods; DL series built by GM, similar to DD & DF
Electro Motive Division	Iran	Islamic Republic of Iran Railways	183	60.501 – 60.569, 60.801 – 60.914	
Electro-Motive Division & Hyundai Rolling Stock Company	South Korea	Korean National Railroad	186	7101 – 7120, 7121 – 7140, 7141 – 7190, 7201 – 7240, 7501 – 7556	7101-7120, 7121-7140, 7201-7210, 7212-7218, 7220, 7223-7224, 7227-7228, 7232-7234, 7236-7237, 7239, 7501-7551, and 7556 built by EMD. 7141-7190, 7211, 7219, 7221-7222, 7225-7226, 7229-7231, 7235, 7238, 7240, and 7552-7555 built by HDRS.

== GT26CW-2/-2A/-2B ==
Beginning on January 1, 1972, export customers now had the option to purchase EMD Dash 2 electronics on new orders of locomotives. Customers who did purchase EMD Dash 2 electronics had the -2 suffix applied to the end of the locomotive's model designation. The GT26CW-2 made its debut in 1972, but by the mid-1980s, two new designations were added based on mechanical/electrical improvements after the -2 suffix: Type A and Type B.

Production spanned from September 1972 to (Unknown) 2006.

EMD GT26CW-2/-2A/-2B Orders
Builder	Country	Railroad	Quantity	Road numbers	Notes
Electro-Motive Division	Yugoslavia	Yugoslav Railways	14	663.001 – 663.014	Yugoslav Class 663 Series delivered with JUGOSLAVENSKE ŽELJEZNICE (Croatian) lettering on carbodies
Electro-Motive Division	Morocco	Office National des Chemins de Fer du Maroc	22	DH351 – DH368, DH371 – DH374	
Electro-Motive Division & ABB Henschel	Pakistan	Pakistan Railways	66	4701 – 4736, 8201 – 8230	4701 – 4736 constructed by EMD; 8201 – 8230 designated GT26CW-2A & constructed by ABB Henschel with a redesigned cab, trucks and a 16-645E3C engine
General Motors Diesel Division	Peru	Empresa Nacional de Ferrocarriles del Perú	7	751 - 757	
General Motors Diesel Division & Hyundai Precision Company	Iran	Islamic Republic of Iran Railways	80	60.915 – 60.994	60.915 – 60.974 built by GMDD, 60.975 – 60.994 built by HPC and designated GT26CW-2A
Electro-Motive Division	Israel	Rakevet Israel	1	701	Equipped with a cowcatcher and gyralight
Equipamentos Villares S.A.	Nigeria	Nigerian Iron Ore	3	900 – 902	Designated GT26CW-2B
Hyundai Precision Company	Nigeria	Nigerian Railway Corporation	5	2001–2005	Built with extra jacking pads and without dynamic brakes
Türkiye Lokomotif ve Motor Sanayi A.Ş.	Turkey	Türkiye Cumhuriyeti Devlet Demiryolları	89	DE33001 – DE33089	'Headspace' cab design – Equipped with a 16-645E3C engine
Hyundai Precision Company & Korean Rail Vehicle Company	South Korea	Korean National Railroad	194	7301 – 7383, 7401 – 7484, 7557 – 7583	Equipped with triple clasp HT-C trucks; 7445 – 7484 built by Korean Rail Vehicle Company. Locomotive #7435 made the first trial run into South Korea on 17 May 2007; #7303 made another run on 11 December 2007.

== GT26HCW-2 ==
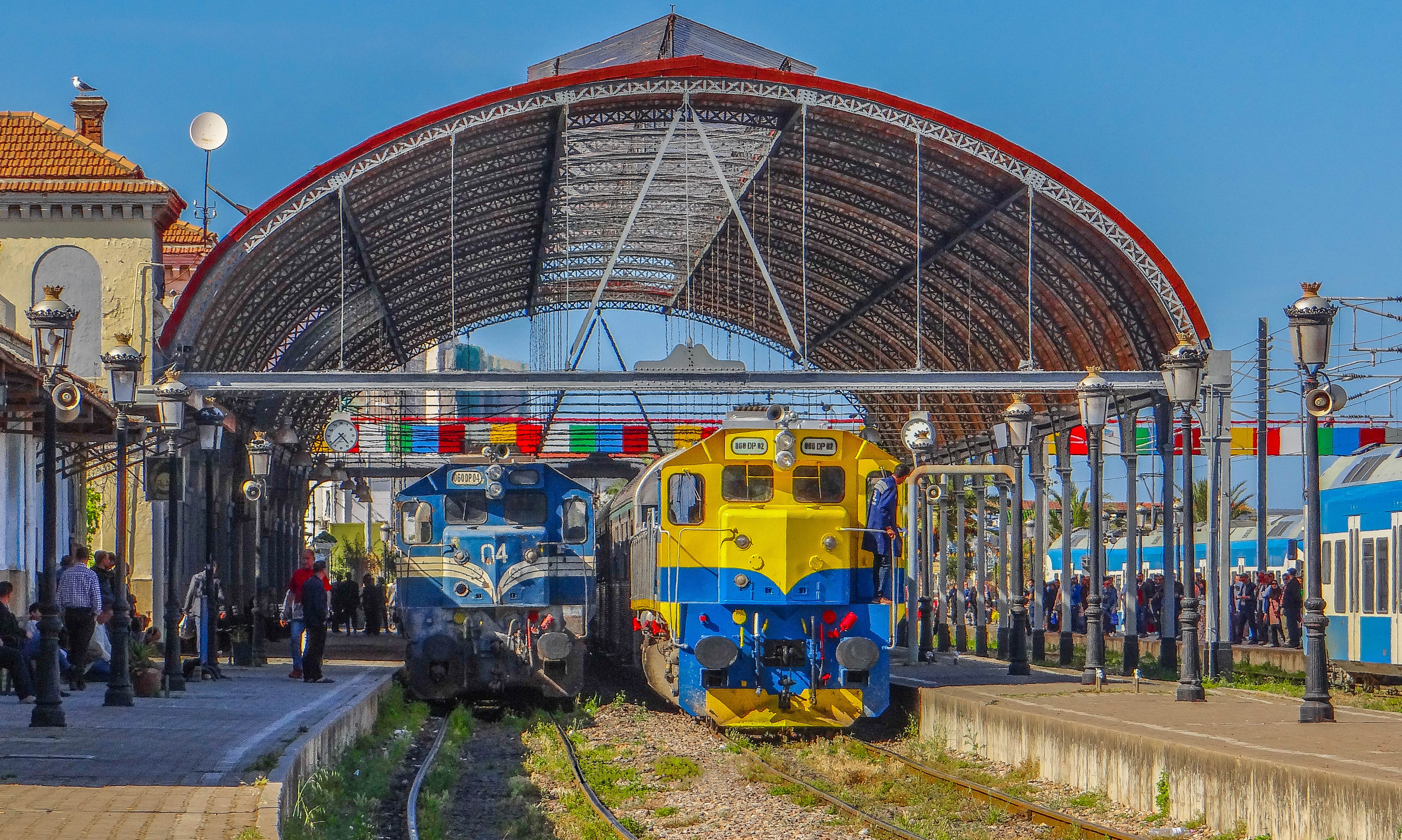
Two GT26HCW-2 locomotives at Algiers station in October 2018.

To provide high horsepower in the passenger service, EMD installed Vapor Clarkson boilers for Head End Power on the GT26 series. Customers who purchased locomotives with Head End Power had the H suffix applied after the GT26 designation. Designated GT26HCW-2, this model was only purchased by the SNTF, Algeria's national railway operator.

Two separate orders were placed by the SNTF, with the first resulting in the production of ten units designated as the 060-DM class in early 1990. A second order, again for ten units, was built in late 1994, and became known as the 060-DP class.

EMD GT26HCW-2 Orders
Builder	Country	Railroad	Quantity	Road numbers	Notes
General Motors Diesel Division	Algeria	Société Nationale des Transports Ferroviaires (SNTF)	10	060DM01 – 060DM10	Built by GMDD
Electro-Motive Division	Algeria	Société Nationale des Transports Ferroviaires (SNTF)	10	060DP01 – 060DP10	Built by EMD

== GT26MC ==
One of the earliest South African Narrow Gauge export customers for the GT26 Series, the South African Railways purchased custom built GT26MC locomotives that were equipped with lightweight frames shorter than standard a GT26 frame by 1 ft (304.8 mm) as well as a six axle (C) interlinked trucks.

The locomotives received the M suffix which identifies the lightweight frame as well as Universal type traction motors for 3 ft 6 in (1,067 mm) rail operation; thus Metric would be the understood term.

Production spanned from August 1971 to August 1982.

EMD GT26MC Orders
Builder	Country	Railroad	Quantity	Road numbers	Notes
Electro-Motive Division & General Motors South Africa	South Africa	South African Railways	308	34.201 – 34.250, 34.601 – 34.700, 34.801 – 34.858, 37.001 – 37.100	34.2 Series built by EMD; 34.6, 34.8 & 37.0 series built by GMSA. Various units sold to Spoornet Tração do Brasil Ltda. in the late 1990s. 3 ft 6 in (1,067 mm) gauge
General Motors South Africa	South Africa	KwaZulu Finance & Develop Corporation	1	666.0090	3 ft 6 in (1,067 mm) gauge

== GT26CU-2 ==
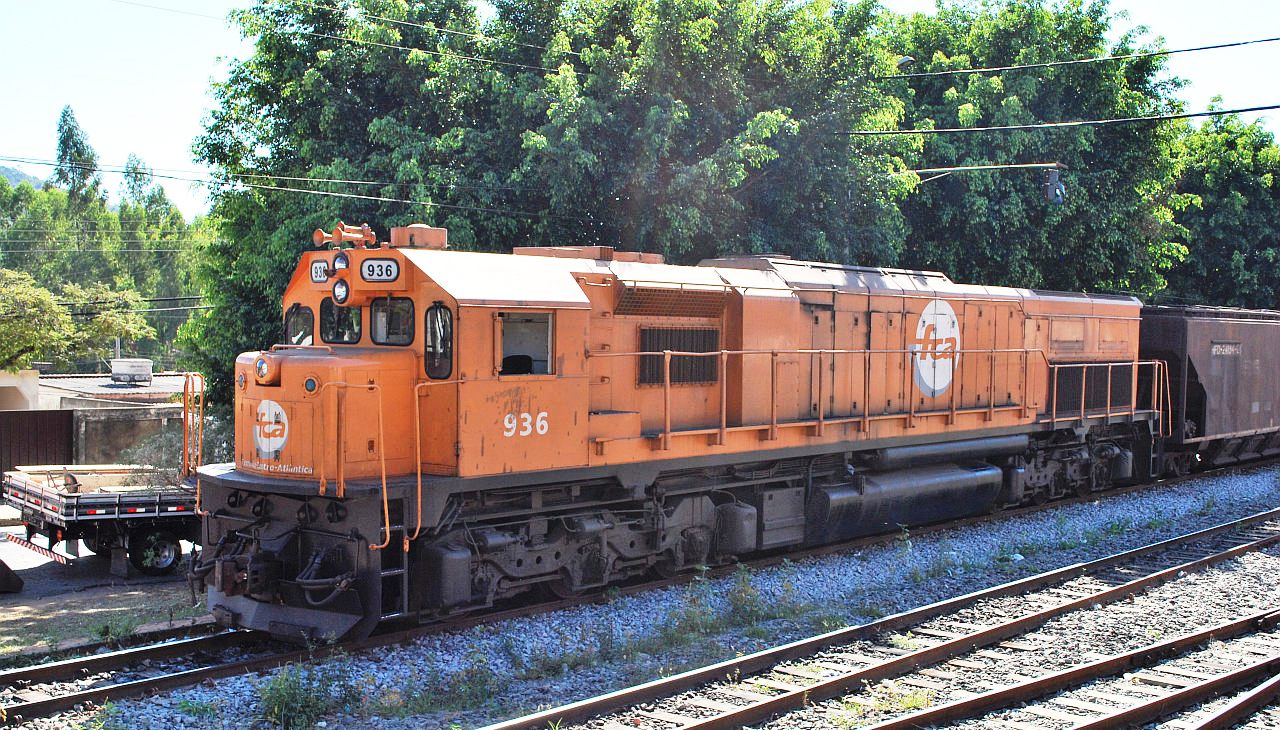
A GT26CU-2 in Brazil in 2009.

The EMD GT26CU-2 first appeared in 1976. Unlike its turbocharged predecessor the GT16, the GT26CU-2 was identified with a U suffix which indicated that this model had traction motors that could fit the locomotive's axles from Metre gauge to Irish gauge rails; thus Universal would be the understood term for the traction motors.

Production spanned from May 1976 to August 1992.

EMD GT26CU-2 Orders
Builder	Country	Railroad	Quantity	Road numbers	Notes
Electro-Motive Division & Material y Construcciones S.A.	Brazil	Estrada de Ferro Vitória a Minas	34	901 – 934	901 – 904 built by EMD, 905 – 934 built by MACOSA 1,000 mm (3 ft 3 3/8 in) gauge
Equipamentos Villares S.A.	Brazil	Estrada de Ferro Vitória a Minas	6	935 – 940	1,000 mm (3 ft 3 3/8 in) gauge
Electro-Motive Division	Zimbabwe	National Railways of Zimbabwe	13	2101–2113	3 ft 6 in (1,067 mm) gauge

== GT26CU-MP ==
In 1990, the GT26 Series made an unusual departure with the use of microprocessor equipped technology. Customers who purchased locomotives equipped with microprocessors were identified by a -MP suffix added after the model designation. Only the Estrada de Ferro Vitória a Minas was the sole purchaser of the GT26CU-MP locomotive model for use on its Narrow Gauge (U) rail lines. These locomotives are easily identified due to their full-length fuel tank, disappearance of the battery box cabinet, and a rectangular windshield on the engineer's side of the cab. Internally, the locomotive's standard control stand was now replaced with a short desktop control stand.

Production spanned from August 1990 to September 1991.

EMD GT26CU-MP Orders
Builder	Country	Railroad	Quantity	Road numbers	Notes
Equipamentos Villares S.A.	Brazil	Estrada de Ferro Vitória a Minas	9	941 – 949	1,000 mm (3 ft 3 3/8 in) gauge

== GT36CU-MP ==
With the introduction of the 16-645F3B engine for export use, the 26 Series was now identified as the 36 Series, by adding a Further 10 to the predecessor model. Only Zambia Railways purchased the GT36 series with six axle (C) universal traction motors (U) and microprocessor (-MP) controlled computer electronics – designating the model as GT36CU-MP.

Production spanned from October to November 1992.

EMD GT36CU-MP Orders
Builder	Country	Railroad	Quantity	Road numbers	Notes
General Motors Diesel Division	Zambia	Zambia Railways	15	01.601 – 01.615	3 ft 6 in (1,067 mm) gauge

== GT36CW/HCW ==
Made for Algeria's SNTF Standard Gauge network in 2007. CW is for freight and HCW for is passenger duties, painted in orange and sky-blue liveries respectively. The locomotives are classed as 060-DR in the freight series and 060-DS in the passenger series. Their design is very similar to Indian Railways' broad gauge GT46MAC (WDG-4) and GT46PAC (WDP-4) locomotives, except for the gauge difference and that they have a 3,600 HP (2.7 MW) 16-645F3B, with DC Traction, rather than the 4,000–4,500 HP (3–3.4 MW) 16-710G3B/C (EMD 710) with AC Traction used in the WDP4/WDG4, being the second set of models in the GT36 series, nearly 15 years after the GT36CU-MP's production ended.

GT36CW/HCW in Algeria

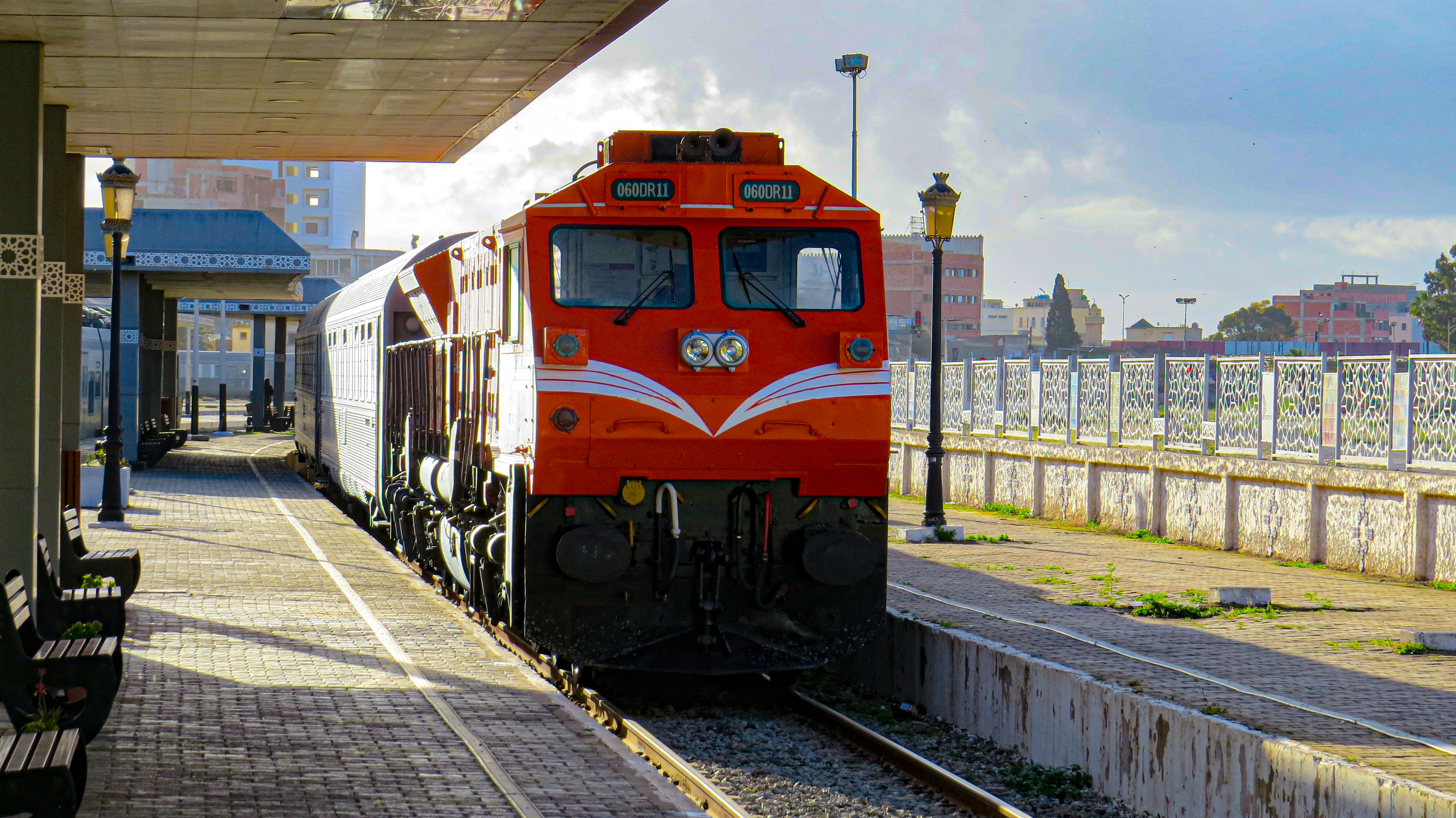
SNTF Class 060 DR (GT36 CW)

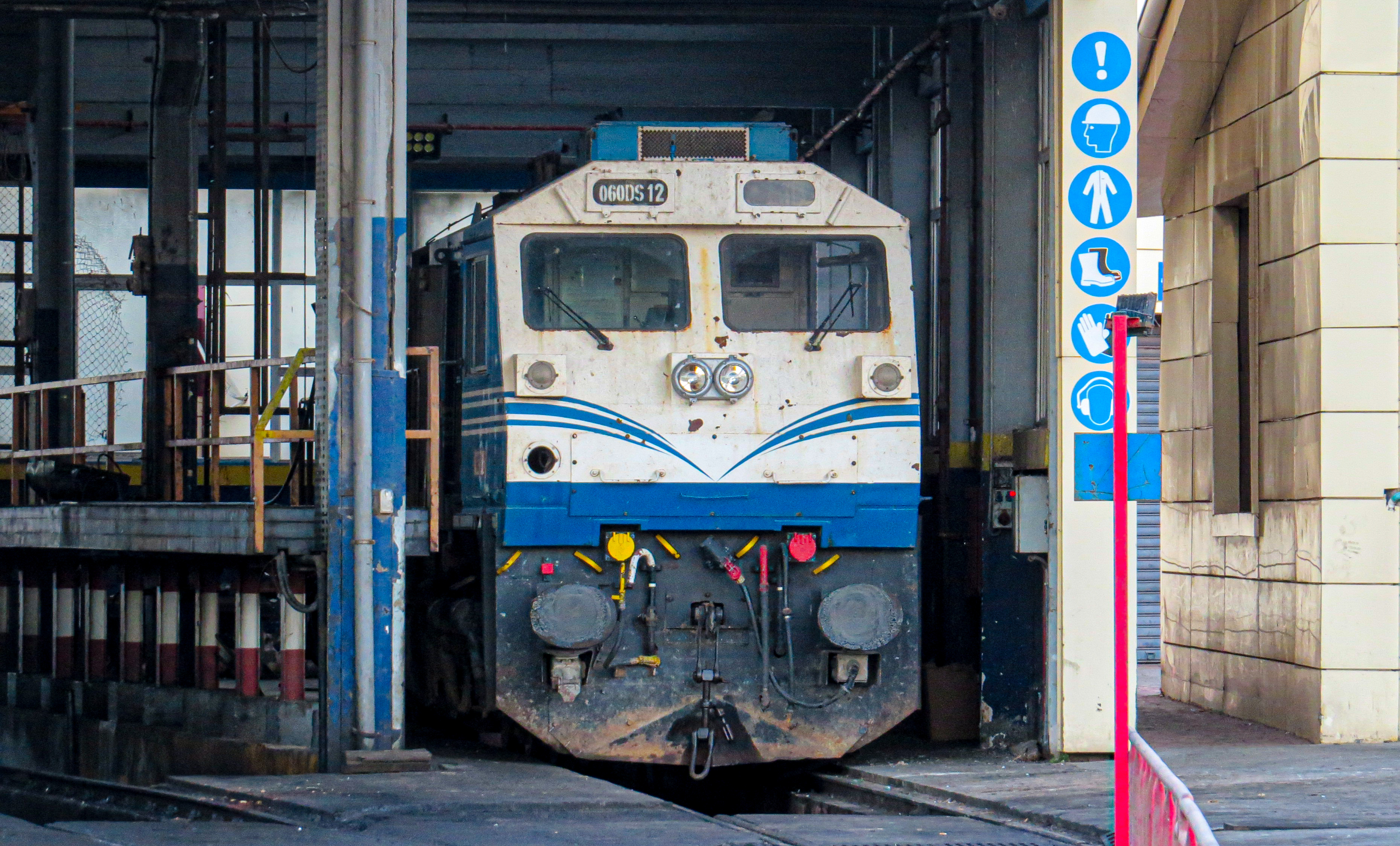
SNTF Class 060 DS (GT36 HCW)

EMD GT36CW/HCW Orders
Builder	Country	Railroad	Quantity	Road numbers	Notes
General Motors Diesel Division	Algeria	SNTF	-	-	1,435 mm (4 ft 8 1/2 in) gauge

== See also ==
- Iranian locomotives
