= Manildra Group =

Australian agribusiness

- Industry: Agribusiness
- Founded: 1952
- Founder: Dick Honan
- Headquarters: Gladesville
- Number of locations: 7 locations: Bomaderry; Cootamundra; Gunnedah; Harwood; Manildra
- Products: Ethanol; Glucose; Meat processing Starch
- Revenue: $1.2 billion
- Owner: Honan family
- Website: www.manildra.com.au

The Manildra Group is an Australian agribusiness based in Sydney. It was formed in 1952 when Dick Honan purchased a flour mill in Manildra. In 1966 a starch and gluten plant was established in Auburn. In the early 1970s, further starch plants opened in Bomaderry and Devonport, Tasmania, a glucose plant in Bomaderry and a flour mill in Gunnedah purchased.

In 1985 the Auburn plant closed with operations transferred to Bomaderry. In 1991, Ethanol production commenced in Bomaderry. In July 2014, Manildra diversified into meat production with the purchase of an abattoir in Cootamundra.

In 2021, Manildra was ranked 29th on FoodTalks' Top Global Specialty Oil Company list.

In October 2024, two grain silos at Manildra's Shoalhaven Starches plant in Bomaderry collapsed, spilling grain into the Shoalhaven River and triggering an emergency response. No significant environmental harm was caused to the river but the NSW Environment Protection Authority ordered Shoalhaven Starches to fund over $170,000 for local environmental projects and to undertake an environmental hazard analysis to prevent future incidents.

== Sunshine Sugar ==
Sunshine Sugar is partnership between the grower-owned New South Wales Sugar Milling Co-operative and the Australian family-owned business, Manildra Group.
