= GML10 =

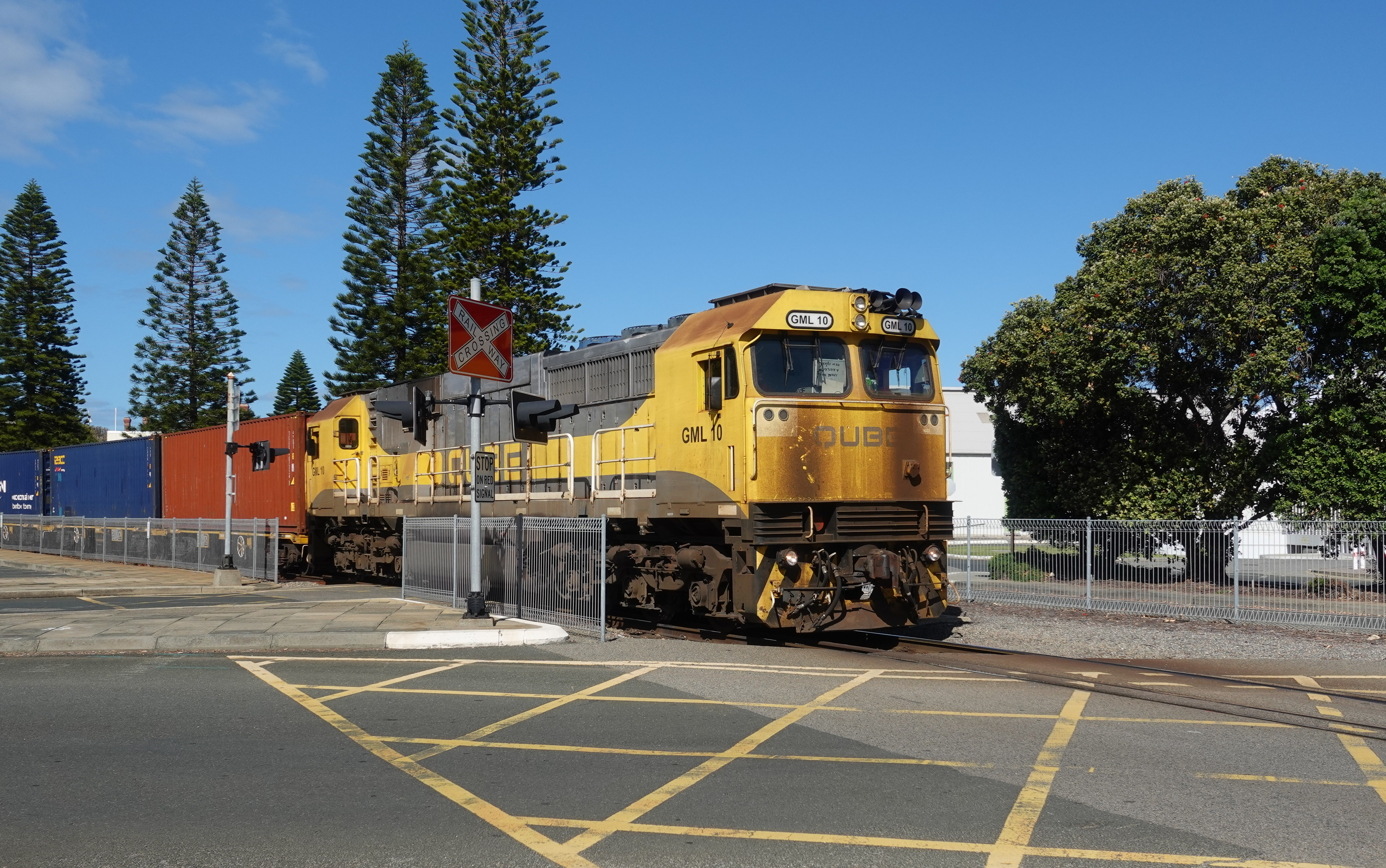
- GML10 in Fremantle, October 2022
Type and origin
- Power type: Diesel-electric
- Builder: Clyde Engineering, Kelso
- Serial number: 90-1277
- Model: EMD JT42C
- Build date: 1990
- Total produced: 1
Specifications
- Configuration
  - UIC: Co-Co
- Gauge: 1,435 mm (4 ft 8 1/2 in) standard gauge
- Length: 18.87 m (61 ft 11 in)
- Loco weight: 132 tonnes (130 long tons; 146 short tons)
- Fuel type: Diesel
- Prime mover: EMD 12-710G3
- Alternator: EMD AR11-WBA-CA5
- Traction motors: EMD D87ETR
- Cylinders: 12
Performance figures
- Maximum speed: 121 km/h (75 mph)
- Power output: 3,030 hp (2,260 kW)
- Tractive effort: 413 kN (93,000 lbf)
Career
- Operators: Qube
- Number in class: 1
- Numbers: GML10
- Delivered: May 1990
- First run: April 1990
- Current owner: Qube
- Disposition: 1 in service

GML10 is a diesel-electric locomotive built by Clyde Engineering, Kelso for the Goldsworthy Mining Company in 1990. It is currently operated by Qube.

== History ==
GML10's design is a hybrid of two earlier classes of Clyde-built locomotives, its frame and bodywork are essentially copied from the N class (EMD JT22HC-2) built for V/Line between 1985 and 1987, while its traction equipment and mechanical configuration is much closer to that employed on Australian National's DL class (model AT42C).

Construction commenced almost immediately after the final DL class unit had been delivered, and in April 1990, the new locomotive undertook a trial run of approximately 82 kilometres to Lithgow. It was subsequently worked to Perth in May 1990 at the head of a normal freight service, before being moved by road to the Goldsworthy railway.

Goldsworthy were acquired by BHP in late 1990, and during the amalgamation with BHP's other railway operations GML10 was renumbered to GML20 to avoid having two locomotives both using number 10.

In 1994 BHP listed the locomotive for sale, having elected to standardise on an all General Electric fleet. It was purchased by Comalco in August of that year and renumber R1004, for use on its 20 km (12 mi) bauxite railway at Weipa, Queensland.

In 2009, R1004 was sold to Australian Locolease who resold it to Qube. In late 2010, it was shipped to Newcastle before being taken to Chicago Freight Car Leasing Australia's Goulburn Railway Workshops for overhaul in March 2011. It returned to service in August 2011 as GML10 operating Qube services in South Australia and Victoria.

Though Clyde never built another GML class locomotive, the design did become the basis of FreightCorp's 82 class and Westrail's S class, both of which were also designated as JT42Cs. GML10 itself would be replaced by two JT42Cs in 2009. The EMD Class 66 in the UK and Europe (model number JT42CWRM) is a relative of GML10, the Class 82 and the S class.

In 2021, GML10 was transferred to Western Australia to work Watco Australia's Forrestfield to Fremantle Harbour intermodal container service.

== Liveries ==
GML10 was outshopped in a version of the V/Line orange and grey colour scheme, albeit without logos. After Goldsworthy's acquisition by BHP, it was repainted into BHP blue and white. After being sold to Comalco, it was repainted in their yellow and red colour scheme. Since 2011, it has worn Qube's silver and yellow.
