= P class =

P class or Class P may refer to:

== Computing ==
- P (complexity), a computational complexity class

== Rail transport ==
- MRWA P class, a class of steam locomotives of the Western Australian Government Railways and Midland Railway of Western Australia
- Two classes of steam locomotives used by the New Zealand Railways Department:
  - NZR P class (1876), of 1876
  - NZR P class (1885), of 1885
- WAGR P Class, a 1924 express steam-locomotive of the Western Australian Government Railways
- Westrail P class, a class of diesel locomotive
- V/Line P class, a type of diesel electric locomotive, in service with V/Line and Pacific National in Australia
- Victorian Railways P class (1859), a class of steam locomotives
- SECR P class, a class of locomotives of the South Eastern and Chatham Railway in the UK
- South Australian Railways P class, a class of steam locomotives
- Tasmanian Government Railways P class, a class of steam locomotive
- DSB class P, a class of steam locomotives of the Danish State Railways
- NER Class P, a class of steam locomotives of the North Eastern Railway
- Palestine Railways P class
- P-class Melbourne tram
- P-class Sydney tram

== Ships and yachts ==
- P-class cruiser, a class of 12 heavy cruisers planned for construction by the Kriegsmarine during the late 1930s, but cancelled before any could be built
- Pelorus-class cruiser, a class of 11 protected cruisers operated by the Royal Navy and Royal Australian Navy from the 1890s to the 1920s
- P-class destroyer, a class of 8 Royal Navy destroyers built during World War II
- P-class sloop, operated by the British navy during World War I
- P-class submarine (disambiguation), a number of submarine classes
- P-class sailing dinghy, a New Zealand sailing dinghy design first created in the 1920s, popularly used for sail training
- P-class yacht (Universal Rule), a development class for America's Cup racing yachts under the Universal Rule
