= Bauxite mining in Australia =

Extraction of Bauxite in Australia

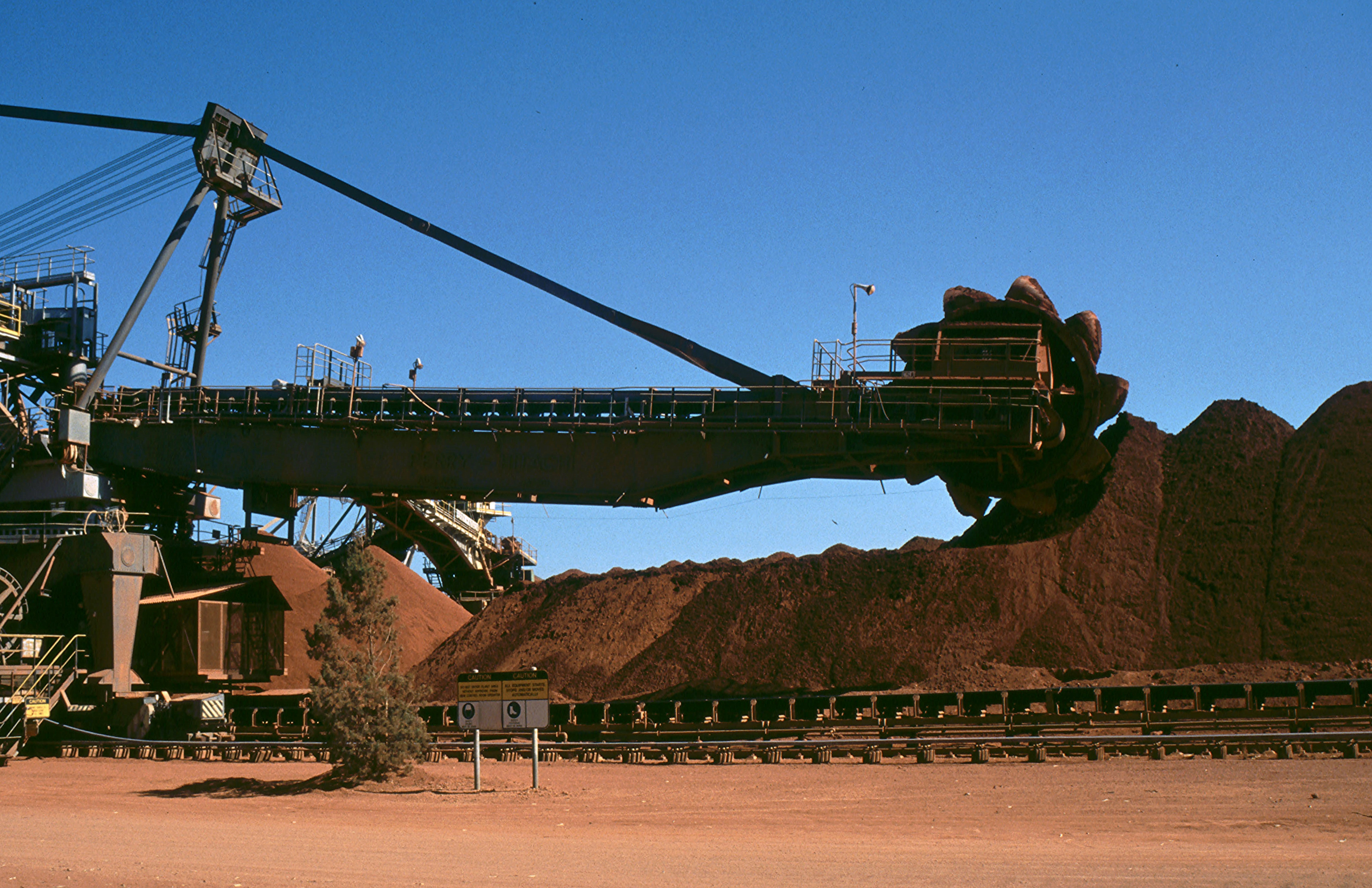
- Mining equipment at Weipa bauxite mine

Location
- Country: Australia

Production
- Commodity: Bauxite
- Production: 102 million tonnes
- Value: $3.3 billion AUD
- Year: 2018-19

Bauxite mining in Australia is an economically significant industry both for Australia and globally. The industry focuses on the mining of bauxite, the primary raw material for alumina and aluminium. Australia is the world's largest bauxite producer, producing almost a third of global bauxite.

Bauxite is mined in Australia using open-cut mining, which suits the relatively shallow bauxite deposits located mostly in Western Australia and Queensland. Mined bauxite is either exported or refined domestically into alumina. The large majority of domestic bauxite and alumina is exported to China. Australia produced approximately 102 million tonnes of bauxite in the 2018-19 year from seven main bauxite mines generating about $3.3 billion AUD of revenue. Sustainable bauxite mining in Australia is regulated under the Sustainable Bauxite Mining Guidelines.

== Uses ==
Bauxite is a raw material used primarily in the production of aluminium. The bauxite ore is refined into alumina before being smelted into aluminium. Australia is known for its high-grade ore, especially in the Weipa and Gove deposits. The quality of bauxite ore is determined by its available alumina (Al_{2}O_{3}) content. The presence of impurities, which make the ore more difficult to refine, are taken into consideration when grading ore quality. In 2020, IBISWorld predicted that about 49% of bauxite mined in Australia would be of high quality. One-quarter of the total bauxite ore mined in Australia is exported. Almost all of this goes to China. The other three-quarters is refined domestically into alumina using the Bayer process. In 2015, 90% of domestically refined alumina was exported.

== Mining ==
In Australia, bauxite is mined using an open-cut method. This is possible because most bauxite in Australia can be found at or relatively close to the surface and is easily accessible by this method. Open cut mining involves first removing the area above the bauxite ore called the overburden. Much of the topsoil is stored, conserving seeds, vegetation and soil for rehabilitation when mining operations finish. Once the overburden is cleared, excavators and front-end loaders mine the exposed bauxite ore. It is then loaded into haul trucks which transport the bauxite to storage. The hauled bauxite is then crushed and ground into smaller particles which allow for easy transportation to refineries and exportation. The generally high quality and low level of impurities in Australian bauxite means it does not need heavy processing or treatment.

== Industry overview ==
Australia has been mining bauxite since the early 1960s and is a major economic player in worldwide bauxite mining. It is the largest producer of bauxite in the world, producing 31% of global production in 2016. Australia is also the largest exporter and second highest producer of alumina worldwide, with 17% of global production. In 2018–19, Australia produced approximately 102 million tonnes of bauxite producing $3.26 billion AUD revenue and $1.2 billion AUD from bauxite ore exports. China dominates Australia's bauxite ore exports taking more than 95% of total production.

=== Industry influences ===
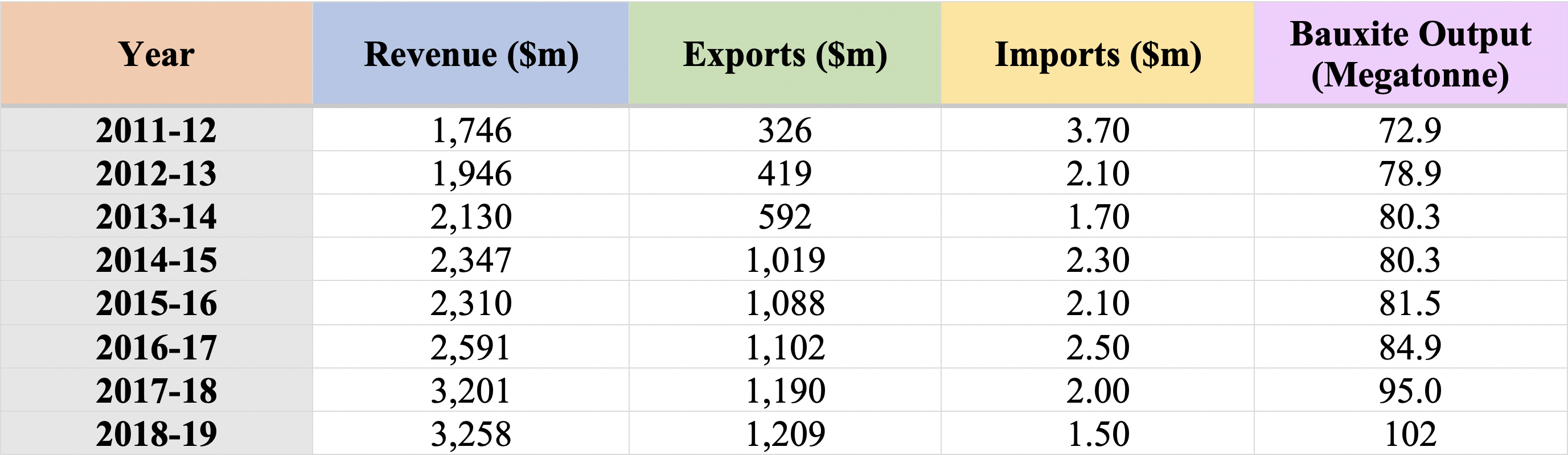
Historical Data for Bauxite mining in Australia

Global demand for alumina

Bauxite is currently the only economically viable raw material to produce alumina. Therefore, any shifts in demand for alumina will also create shifts in demand for the bauxite industry in Australia. This could be increased demand for bauxite ore so countries can produce their own alumina or increased demand for alumina, which would increase domestic bauxite mining and refining.

Aluminium/bauxite pricing

The raw bauxite ore does not have its own price. As a result, bauxite prices are often compared to world aluminium prices when bauxite is being sold. This means that when world aluminium prices are high, bauxite will rise in price and can be sold for more.

Chinese economy

The Chinese economy plays an important role in the demand for aluminium. China is the biggest user of aluminium in the world and to maintain this has begun increasing their domestic aluminium production and importing of bauxite and alumina. During periods of economic growth for China, a high demand for aluminium will lead to demand for bauxite and alumina exports from Australia. China is also the primary country for Australian bauxite exports.

Exchange rates

Exported bauxite and alumina is generally traded using US dollars instead of AUD. As a result, foreign countries may have shifts in demand depending on the exchange rates.

=== Major companies ===
- Rio Tinto
- Alcoa World Alumina and Chemicals
- South32
- Australian Bauxite Limited
- Metro Mining Limited

== Mines ==
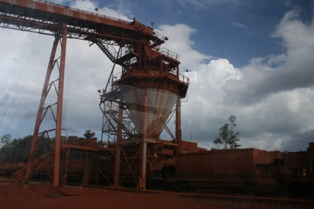
Bauxite mining in Weipa, Australia

=== Weipa Mine ===
Weipa bauxite mine is located on the Cape York Peninsula in Queensland and currently owned by Rio Tinto. In 2018, the mine produced 30.4 million tonnes of bauxite with an alumina percentage of approximately 50.6% Al_{2}O_{3}. The Weipa mine began operations in 1963. Bauxite mining at Weipa wasn't considered until the late 1950s when Harry Evans, a geologist, discovered the large-scale Weipa bauxite deposits. The deposit was originally part of Aboriginal reserves but was leased to Comalco (now known as Rio Tinto) to mine after the “Commonwealth Aluminium Corporation Pty. Limited Agreement Act 1957” removed Indigenous ownership of the area surrounding the deposits. Since then, Rio Tinto has joined three agreements with local Indigenous groups to benefit Indigenous communities surrounding the Weipa mine. These agreements are the ELY Bauxite Mining Project Agreement (EBMPA) made in 1997, the Western Cape Communities Co-Existence Agreement (WCCCA) made in 2001, and the Western Cape Regional Partnership Heads of Agreement made in 2008.

Weipa mine is currently made up of three separate bauxite mines at the East Weipa, Andoom and Amrun deposits. The East Weipa mine is where bauxite mining in Weipa began and has been operating continuously since 1963. Deposits at the East Weipa mine are beginning to run out which has led to the development of the Amrun mine in 2018. Rio Tinto has two refineries, the Alumina Limited refinery and the Yarwun alumina refinery, where bauxite mined at Weipa is refined. Otherwise, the raw bauxite ore is exported.

=== Gove Mine ===
Gove mine is located on the Gove Peninsula in the Northern Territory and is currently owned by Rio Tinto. In 2018, the mine produced 12.5 million tonnes of bauxite with an alumina percentage of approximately 49.2% Al_{2}O_{3}. Bauxite was discovered on Arnhem Land reserves in the Gove Peninsula by the Northern Territory Coastal Patrol Service in 1952. The discovery in Gove was mainly driven by the demand for domestic bauxite sources by the government in response to World War II. This was because, up until then, aluminium supply in Australia had largely depended on foreign bauxite mining and smelting. Unlike in Queensland and Western Australia, the Commonwealth Government determined policy surrounding bauxite mining, and so had power over the Gove bauxite deposit. However, the deposits were inaccessible for mining as they were on Aboriginal reserves. In 1953, the government persuaded the Northern Territory Legislative Council to allow mining on Aboriginal reserves by amending the Aboriginals Ordinance and Mining Ordinance. The French company Pechiney registered an Australian subsidiary, GOMINCO (Gove Mining and Industrial Corporation), formerly Gove Bauxite Corporation and a subsidiary of Australian company Duval Pty Ltd.

In 1963 the Yolngu people submitted the Yirrkala bark petitions to the Australian Parliament, which fought for the recognition of the Yolngu people as the rightful owners of Arnhem Land. In 1963 Pechiney was persuaded to abandon Gove, and the Commonwealth Government bought GOMINCO, and continued trying to lease the Gove bauxite deposits. Commonwealth policy for Gove was centred on two objectives: the industrial development of bauxite refineries in the remote areas of northern Australia, and significant Australian equity in the enterprise. With these objectives in mind, the Commonwealth Government judged companies seeking the bauxite deposits until 1968, when they signed an agreement with Nabalco. In response to the land lease, the Yolngu people challenged Nabalco in what would be the first Aboriginal land rights case: Milirrpum v Nabalco. The case was judged by Justice Blackburn, who ruled against the Yolngu people in 1971. Bauxite mining in Gove started in that same year.

In 2001, the Gove mine was purchased by Alcan, who in 2002 renamed Nabalco to Alcan Gove. Rio Tinto then bought Alcan in 2007 for $38.1 billion and was renamed Rio Tinto Alcan. Since, Rio Tinto has formed the Gove Traditional Owners Agreement under the Aboriginal Land Rights (Northern Territory) Act 1976, the first negotiated agreement over the Gove mine. Bauxite mined from Gove was refined at Rio Tinto's Gove refinery until 2014, when costs led to the refinery closing. While this has had an impact on employment in the local town of Nhulunbuy, bauxite production has been largely unaffected due to proximity and high export demand from China. Rio Tinto is predicting that their Gove mining operations will finish in 2030.

=== Huntly Mine ===
Huntley Mine is located in the Darling Ranges area near Dwellingup in Western Australia and is currently owned by Alcoa of Australia Limited. Huntly mine produces approximately 25 million tonnes of bauxite per year with an alumina percentage of approximately 32.7%. Despite the relatively low grade ore, bauxite mined at Huntly is low in silica, an impurity, which allows for cheaper production of refining. Bauxite mined at Huntly mine is transported to either the Pinjarra Alumina Refinery by an overland conveying system or the Kwinana Alumina refinery by conveyor and rail.

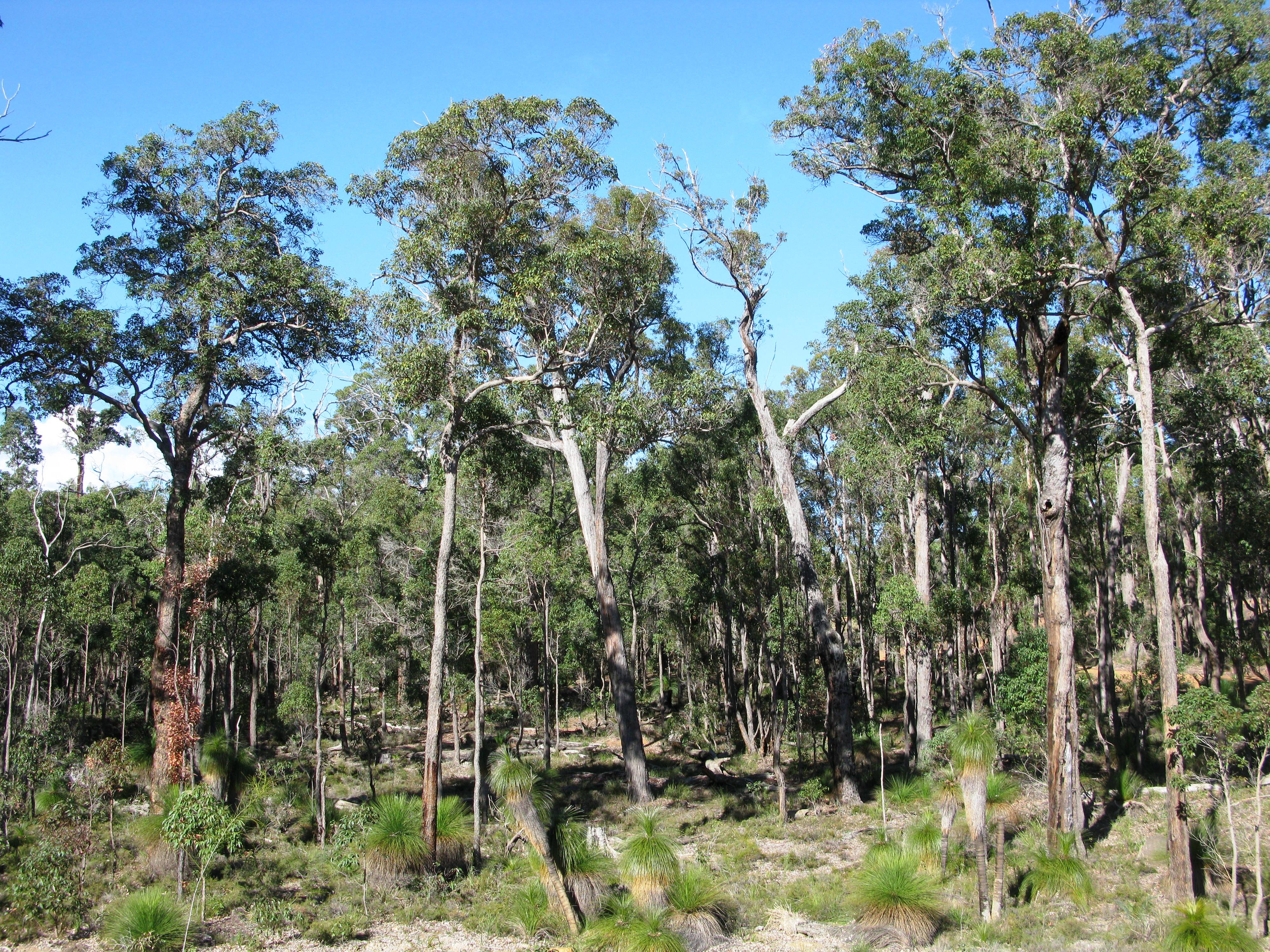
Jarrah forest

The Huntly mine is situated in the Jarrah forest. In 1961, Alcoa obtained a mineral lease ML1sa, which provided them access to bauxite ores in certain areas of the Jarrah forest. Huntly Mine was not established until 1976 and was the second mine in the Darling Ranges, following the Jarrahdale mine started in 1963. Following restoration efforts at Jarrahdale prompted by the government, restoration efforts for both Huntly and Willowdale Mines were implemented and refined over time. This is largely due to public pressure and restoration technology advancements which have led to tighter legislation. Mining operations at Huntly are currently monitored by the Mining and Management Program Liaison Group (MMPLG), a group of government representatives who approve mining plans.

=== Willowdale Mine ===
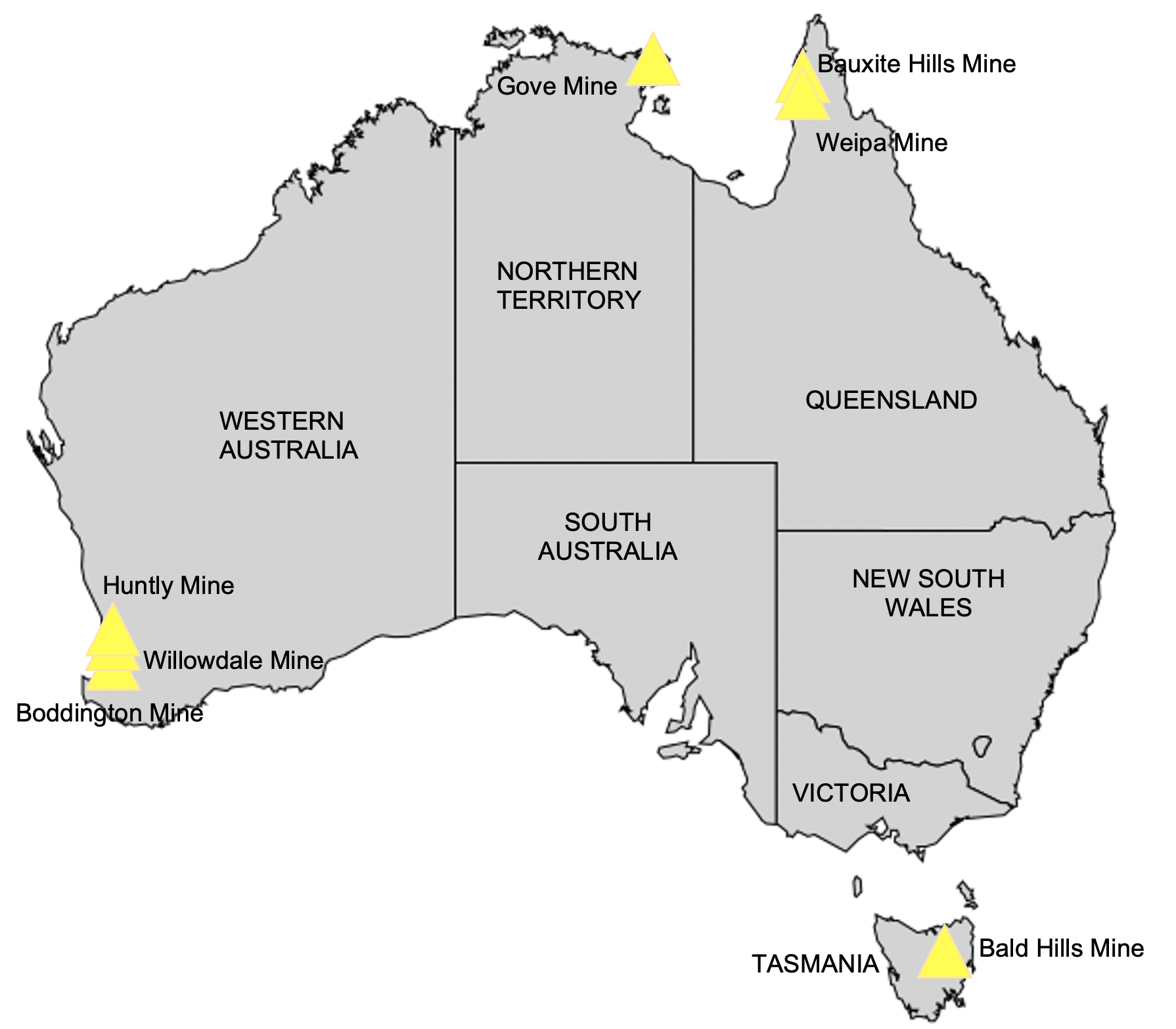
Bauxite mine locations in Australia

Willowdale Mine is located in the Darling Ranges area near Waroona in Western Australia and is currently owned by Alcoa of Australia Limited. Willowdale mine started in 1984 and produces approximately 10 million tonnes of bauxite per year with an alumina percentage of approximately 32.7%. This low grade ore is similar to Huntly mine bauxite in that it is low in silica which allows for cheaper processing costs. Bauxite mined at Willowdale is transported to the Wagerup Alumina refinery. Just like Huntly mine, Willowdale mine is on the Jarrah forest and also operates under the ML1sa mineral lease and is monitored by the MMPLG.

=== Boddington Mine ===
Boddington Mine is located near Boddington in Western Australia and is currently owned by South32. Boddington mine produces approximately 16.7 million tonnes of bauxite per year with an alumina percentage of approximately 28%. Bauxite mined at Boddington is delivered by a 51 km overland conveyor belt to the Worsley refinery, where it is processed into alumina before being delivered 55 km by rail to Bunbury port. Ships then export the Boddington alumina to be smelted into aluminium. The Boddington deposit area was obtained by South32 through a mining lease granted under the Alumina Refinery (Worsley) Agreement Act 1973. Operation of Boddington Bauxite mine did not start until 1984.

=== Bald Hill Mine ===
Bald Hill Mine is located in Campbell Town in Tasmania and is currently owned by Australian Bauxite Limited. Bald Hill mine began mining in 2014 and is currently the only bauxite mine in Tasmania.

=== Bauxite Hills Mine ===
Bauxite Hills Mine is located north of Weipa in North Queensland and is currently owned by Metro Mining Limited. Bauxite Hills mine began mining in 2018.

=== Table of Bauxite Mines in Australia ===
Bauxite/Alumina Mines in Australia
Name	Alternate Names	State	Coordinates	Status	Commodities	Geological Province	Geological Age	Deposit Model
Bauxite Hills		Queensland	11.8348°S 142.0449°E	Care And Maintenance	Bauxite, (Alumina)	Carpentaria Basin		
Ely	Wenlock River	Queensland	12.364°S 141.9°E	Operating Mine	Bauxite	Karumba Basin		
Jarrahdale		Western Australia	32.2716°S 116.074°E	Historic Mine	Bauxite, Alumina	Yilgarn craton, Southwest Terrane, Western Gneiss Terrane	Cenozoic	
Willowdale		Western Australia	32.8451°S 116.0618°E	Operating Mine	Bauxite, Alumina	Yilgarn craton, Southwest Terrane, Western Gneiss Terrane	Cenozoic	
Gove		Northern Territory	12.2611°S 136.837°E	Operating Mine	Bauxite, (Alumina)	Carpentaria Basin	Cenozoic	
Weipa bauxite mine	Weipa, Andoom, Ely	Queensland	12.6637°S 141.8732°E	Operating Mine	Bauxite, (Alumina)	Carpentaria Basin	Cenozoic	
Worsley Alumina	Worsley, Boddington Bauxite Mine, Mt Saddleback	Western Australia	32.9292°S 116.4559°E	Operating Mine	Bauxite, (Alumina)	Yilgarn craton, Southwest Terrane, Western Gneiss Terrane	Cenozoic	
Huntly		Western Australia	32.5558°S 116.1665°E	Operating Mine	Bauxite, (Alumina)	Yilgarn craton, Southwest Terrane, Western Gneiss Terrane	Cenozoic	
Wagerup		Western Australia	32.8985°S 115.9237°E	Historic Mine	Ilmenite, Rutile, Zircon, Leucoxene, Alumina	Southwest Terrane		
South of Embley	Amrun, Boyd	Queensland	12.973°S 141.633°E	Operating Mine	Bauxite, (Alumina)			

== Deposits ==
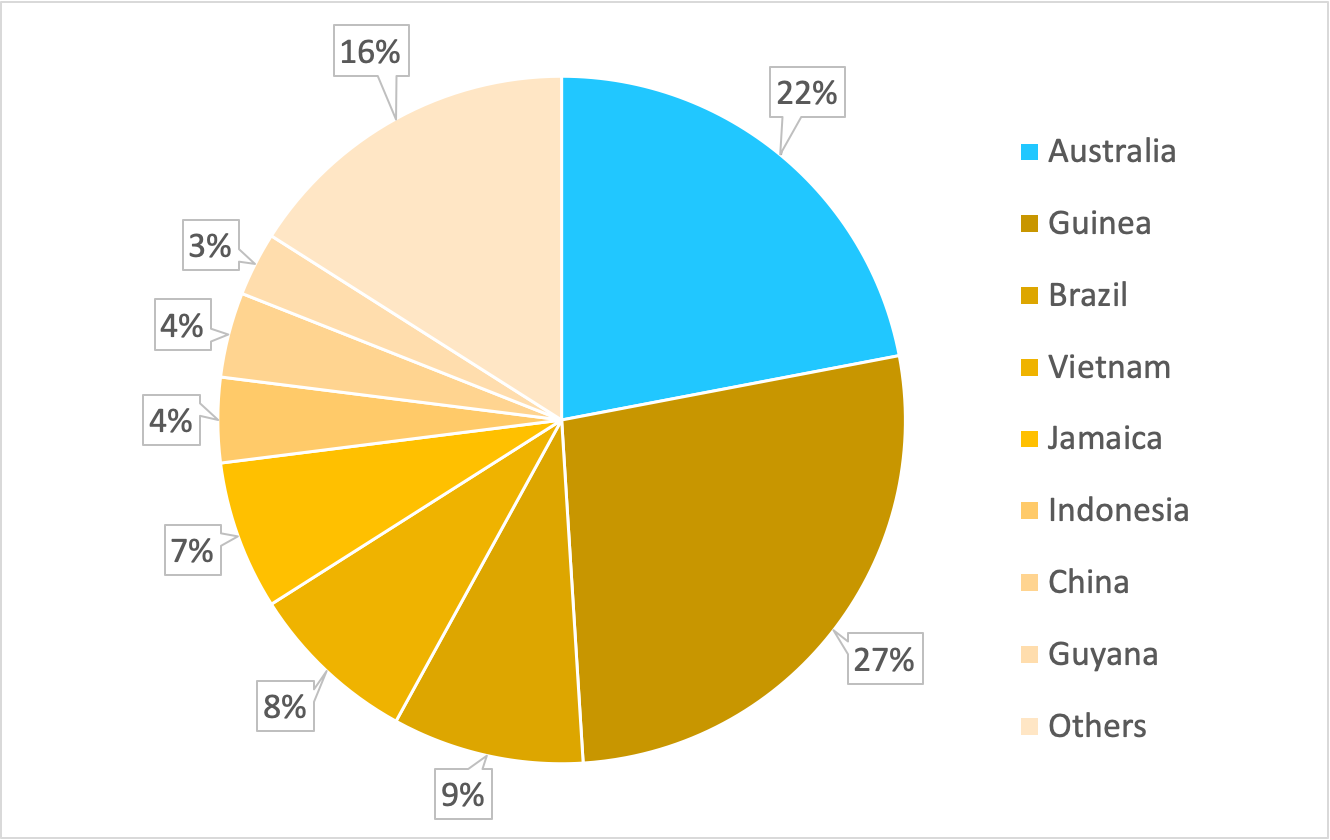
Percentage of worldwide bauxite deposits by country

As well as producing the most bauxite globally, Australia also contains 22% of global bauxite deposits and is second only to Guinea. The majority of bauxite is found in the deposits in far north Queensland and the south west of Western Australia. The deposits around Australia are:

New South Wales

- Guyra
- Inverell
- Nullamanna
- Taralga

Queensland

- Weipa
- South of Embley
- Aurukun
- South Johnstone
- Urquhart
- Hey Point
- Skardon River
- Bauxite hills
- Binjour
- Toondoon
- Monogorilby

Western Australia

- Athena and Ceres
- Dionysus
- Cardea 1 and 2
- Cardea 3
- Felicitas and Fortuna
- Aurora
- Juturna
- Rusina
- Minerva
- Cronus
- Vallonia
- Mitchell Plateau and Cape Bougainville
- Wandoo
- Huntly and Willowdale
- Worsley (Boddington)

Tasmania

- Bald Hill
- Fingal Rail
- Nile Road
- DL130 and Rubble Flat

Northern Territory

- Dhupuma
- Gove

== Guidelines ==
Bauxite mining in Australia is performed under the Sustainable Bauxite Mining Guidelines, an industry self-regulation initiative. The guidelines were developed in 2018 by a collaboration between the Australian Aluminium Council, International Aluminium Institute and the Brazilian Aluminium Association. These peak bodies represent bauxite mining organisations in Australia and globally. The guidelines are adopted voluntarily, with the aim of promoting sustainable and high-quality mining practices and minimising the social and environmental impacts arising from bauxite mining operations and post-closure.

== See also ==
- List of countries by aluminium production
