= Clyde Engineering =

Australian equipment and locomotive manufacturer

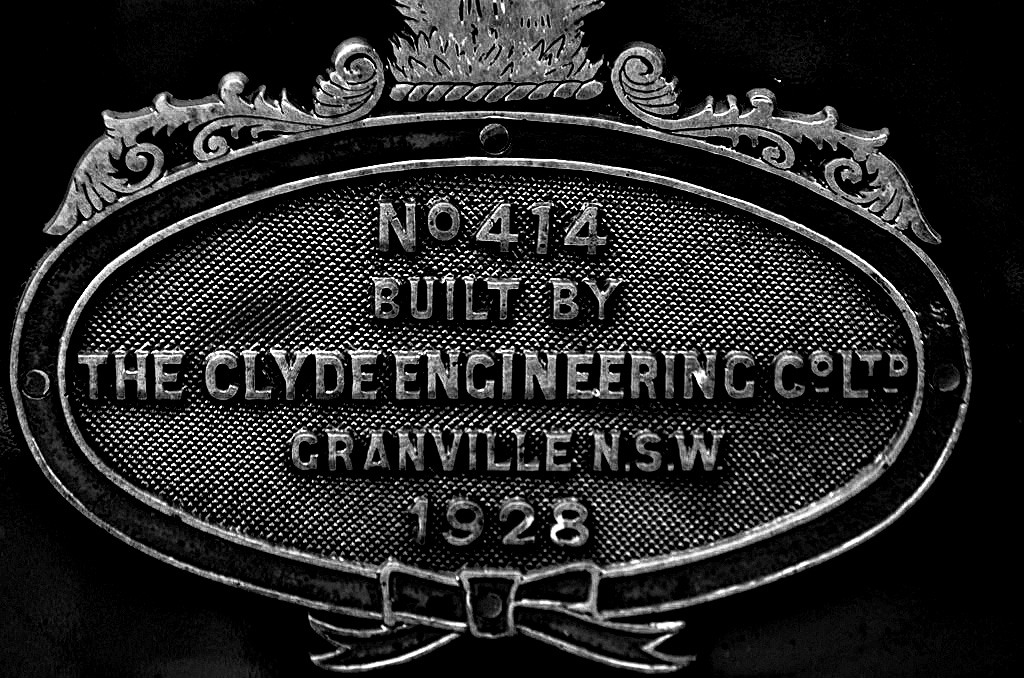
- Clyde Engineering Builder's plate

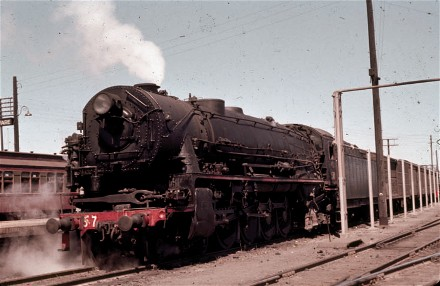
- New South Wales D57 class locomotive in Junee in September 1961
- Type: publicly listed
- Traded as: ASX: CLY
- Industry: Engineering
- Founded: September 1898
- Defunct: 15 July 1996
- Successor: Evans Deakin Industries (1996–2001); Downer Rail (2001–present)
- Headquarters: North Sydney
- Number of locations: Granville; Kelso; Somerton; Eagle Farm; Rosewater
- Subsidiaries: Martin & King

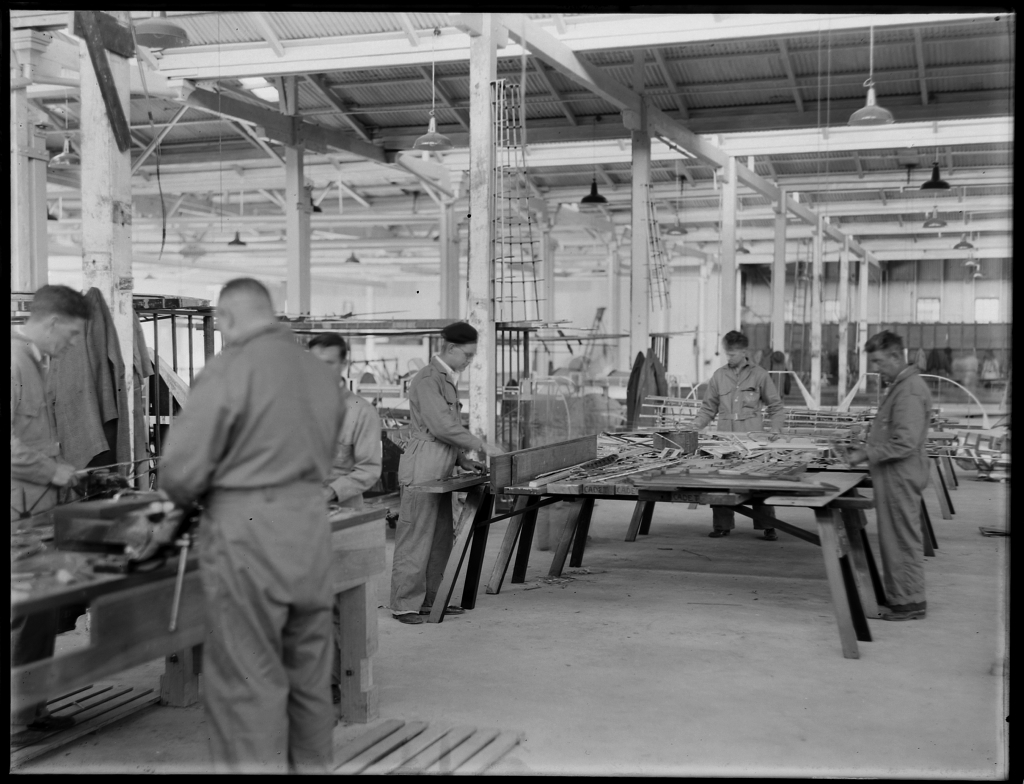
Men at work in the aircraft workshop at Clyde Engineering

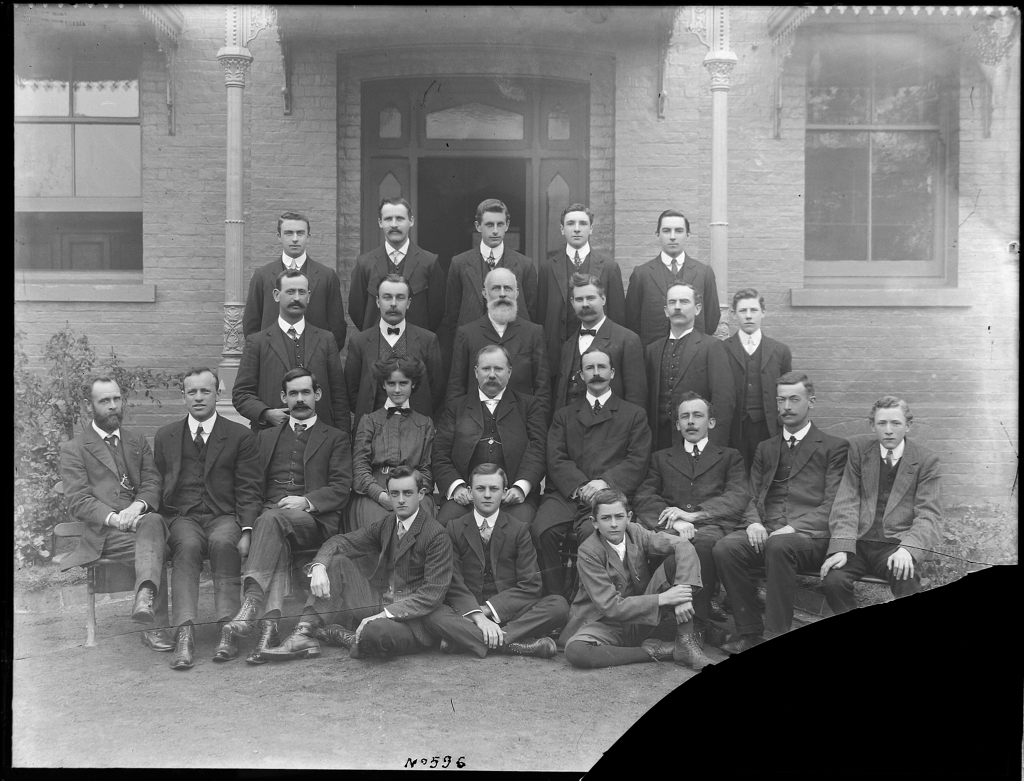
The senior staff of Clyde Engineering in a historic photo

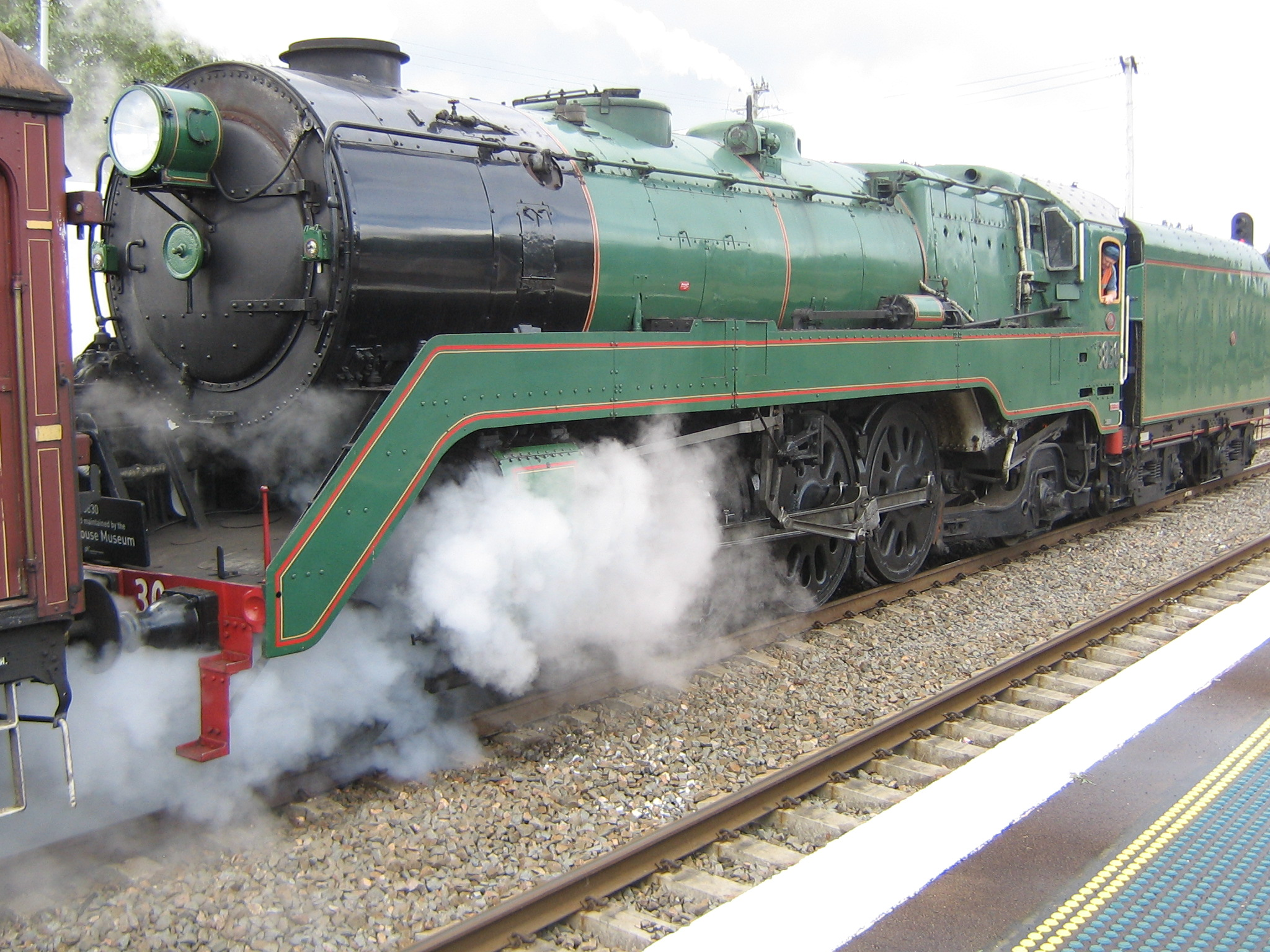
3830 at the Hunter Valley Steamfest in April 2008

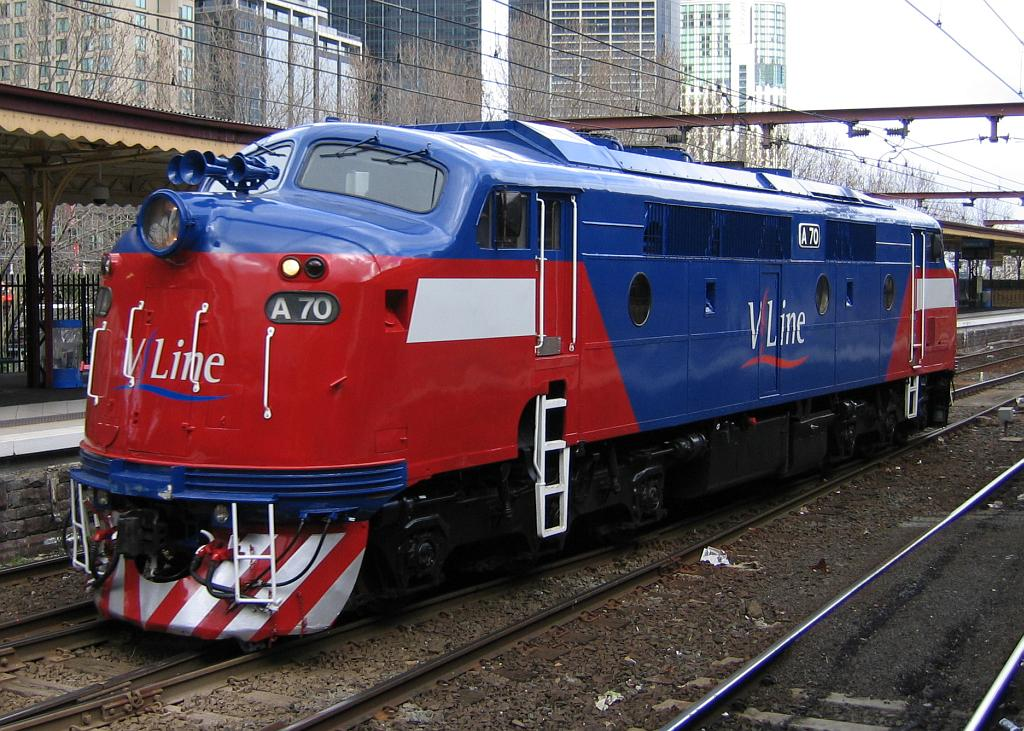
V/Line A class locomotive at Flinders Street station in August 2006

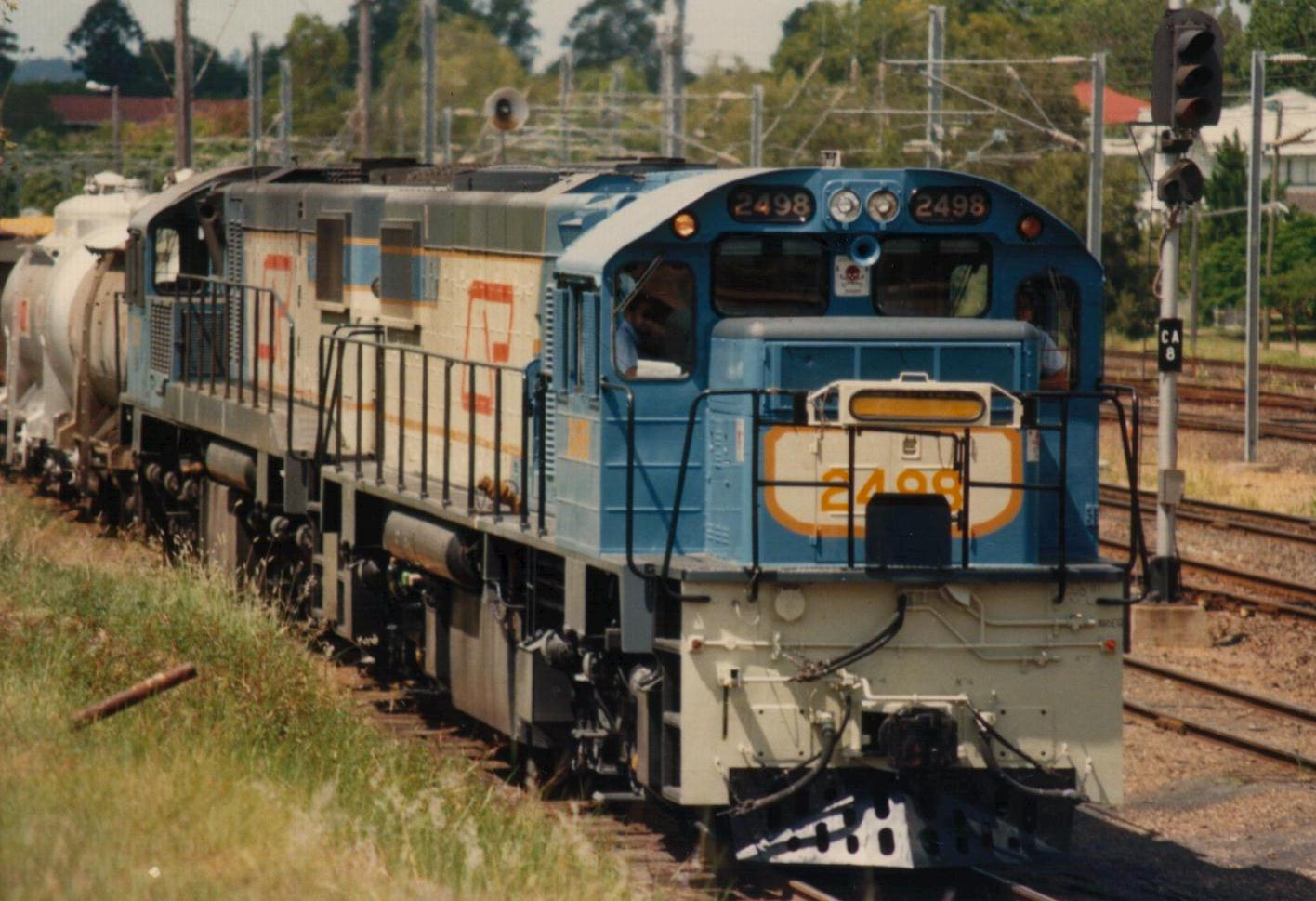
Queensland Rail 2470 class locomotive at Corinda in February 1998

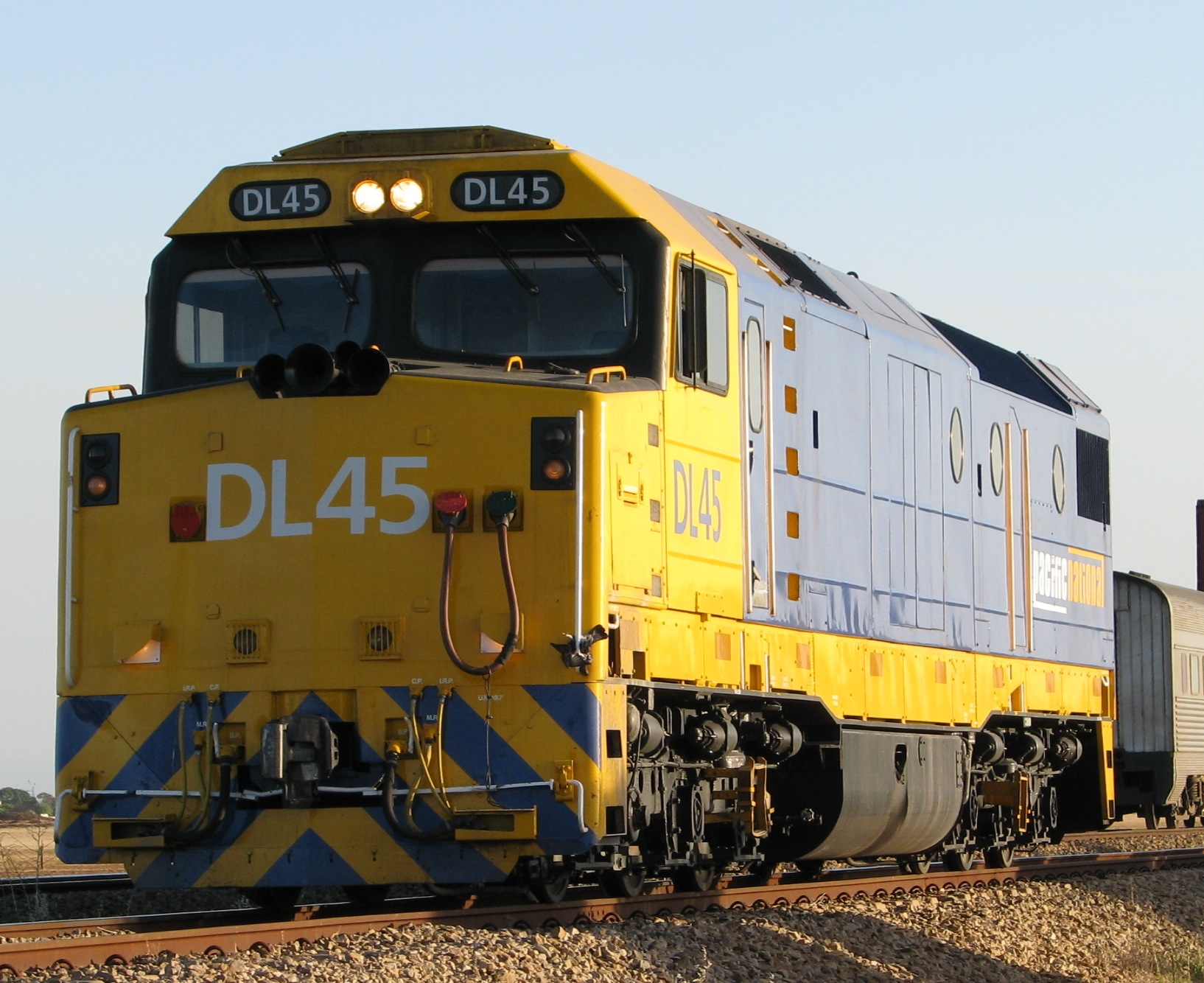
Pacific National DL class locomotive at Two Wells in December 2007

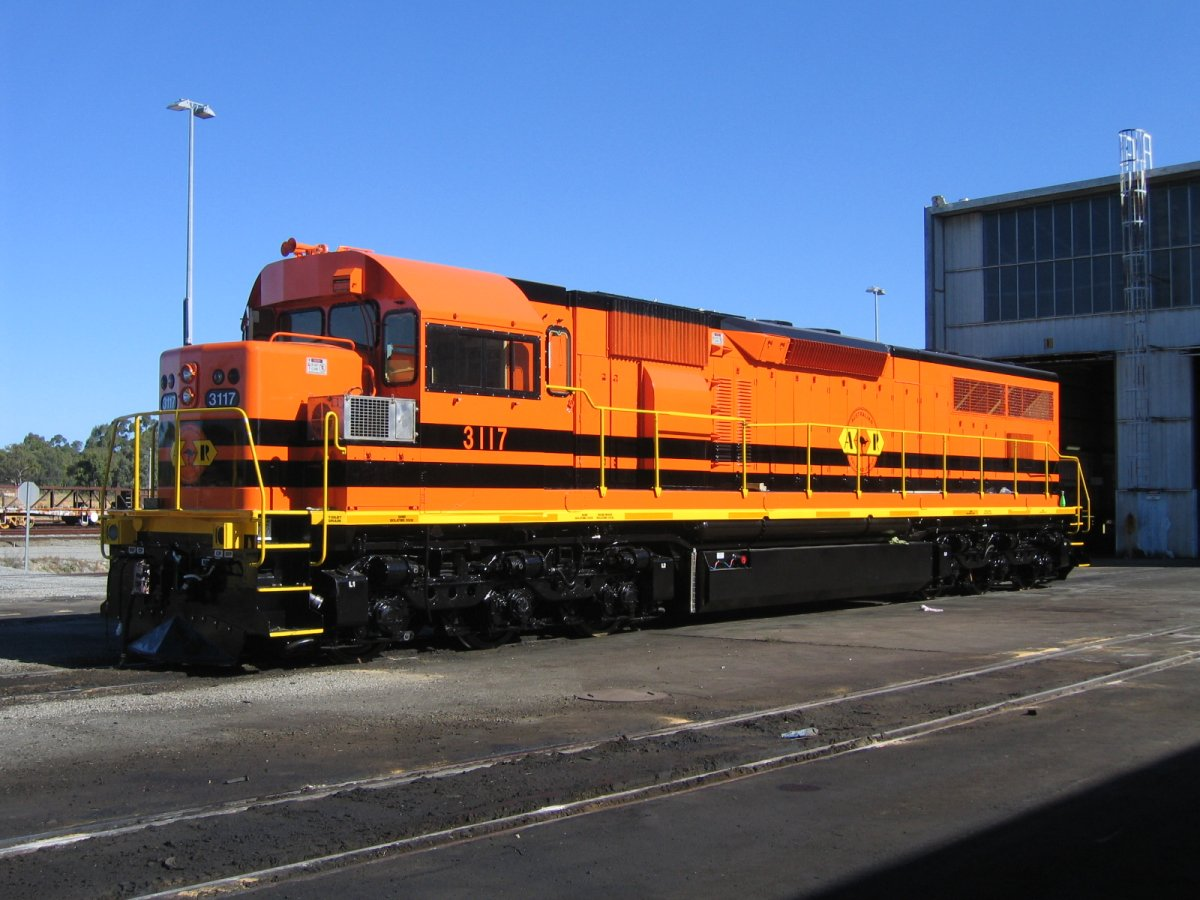
Australian Railroad Group L class locomotive at Forrestfield in December 2012

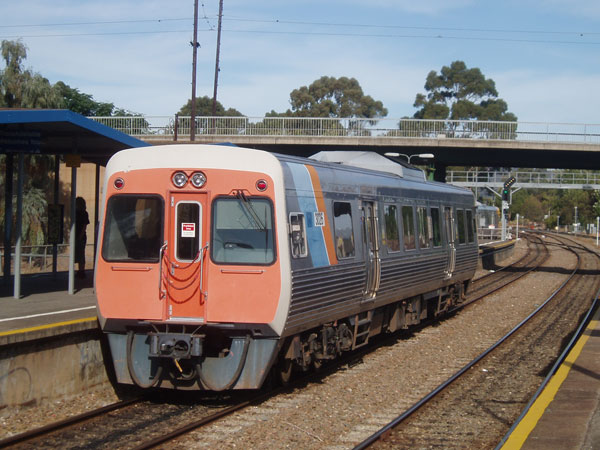
South Australian State Transport Authority 3000 class railcar at Goodwood station in May 2005

Clyde Engineering was an Australian manufacturer of locomotives, rolling stock, and other industrial products.

It was founded in September 1898 by a syndicate of Sydney businessmen buying the Granville factory of timber merchants Hudson Brothers. The company won contracts for railway rolling stock, a sewerage system, trams and agricultural machinery. In 1907 it won its first contract for steam locomotives for the New South Wales Government Railways. By 1923 it had 2,200 employees. After contracting during the depression it became a major supplier of munitions during World War II.

In 1950, it was awarded the first of many contracts for diesel locomotives by the Commonwealth Railways after it was appointed the Australian licensee for Electro-Motive Diesel products. Apart from building locomotives and rolling stock, Clyde Engineering diversified into telephone and industrial electronic equipment, machine tools, domestic aluminium ware, road making and earth making equipment, hydraulic pumps, product finishing equipment, filtration systems, boilers, power stations and firing equipment, car batteries, hoists and cranes, door and curtain tracks and motor vehicle distribution.

In July 1996, it was taken over by Evans Deakin Industries. In March 2001, Evans Deakin was taken over by Downer Group to form Downer EDi.

== Products ==
Amongst the classes of locomotives built by Clyde Engineering were:

=== Steam locomotives ===
==== Commonwealth Railways ====
- 4 G class Granville
- 10 L class Granville
- 8 K class

==== New South Wales ====
- 10 C30T class rebuilt from C30 class Granville
- 45 C32 class Granville
- 65 C36 class Granville
- 5 C38 class Granville
- 30 D50 class Granville
- 160 D53 class Granville
- 120 D55 class Granville
- 25 D57 class Granville

==== South Australia ====
- 10 740 class Granville

=== Tasmania ===
- 20 Q class Granville
- 1 P class Granville

=== Diesel locomotives ===
==== Commonwealth Railways / Australian National ====
- 47 GM class Granville
- 17 CL class Granville
- 6 NJ class Granville
- 8 AL class Rosewater
- 10 BL class Rosewater
- 15 DL class Kelso
- 11 AN class Somerton

==== New South Wales ====
- 6 42 class Granville
- 10 421 class Granville
- 20 422 class Granville
- 18 49 class Granville
- 84 81 class Kelso
- 58 82 class Braemar

==== Victoria ====
- 26 B class Granville
- 18 S class Granville
- 94 T class Granville
- 75 Y class Granville
- 24 X class Granville / Rosewater
- 10 C class Rosewater
- 33 G class Rosewater / Somerton
- 11 A class (rebuilt from B class) Rosewater
- 13 P class (rebuilt from T class) Somerton
- 25 N class Somerton
- 5 H class (Modified T class) Granville

==== Queensland ====
- 13 1400 class Granville
- 10 1450 class Granville
- 42 1460 class Granville
- 29 1502 class Granville
- 27 1550 class Eagle Farm
- 12 1700 class Eagle Farm
- 56 1720 class Eagle Farm
- 27 2100 class Eagle Farm
- 11 2130 class Eagle Farm
- 8 2141 class Eagle Farm
- 14 2150 class Eagle Farm
- 45 2170 class Eagle Farm
- 24 2400 class Eagle Farm
- 18 2450 class Eagle Farm
- 38 2470 class Eagle Farm

==== Western Australia ====
- 25 A class Granville
- 5 J class Granville
- 27 L class Granville / Eagle Farm
- 13 DB class Rosewater
- 19 Q class Forrestfield
- 11 S class Forrestfield

==== Mining ====
- 9 BHP Whyalla DE class Granville
- 5 Hamersley Iron EMD SD50 class Rosewater
- 1 Goldsworthy Mining Company GML10 Kelso

==== New Zealand ====
- D^{A} class N^{O}'s 1430–1439, Phase II variant of the class. Featured longer-than-standard chassis to accommodate a larger fuel tank than the earlier Phase I (1955) variant.
- DBR class rebuilt from Canadian-built D^{B} class in 1980–1982.
- D^{C} class rebuilt from Canadian-built Phase III D^{A} class locomotives from 1978 to 1981.

=== Electric locomotives ===
==== Queensland ====
- 22 3300/3400 class Kelso / Somerton

=== Diesel railcars ===
==== South Australia ====
- 50 3000 class railcars Somerton

=== Electric multiple units ===
==== New South Wales ====
- 205 Suburban single deck carriages

=== Electric tramcars ===
==== New South Wales ====
- 10 C-Class Granville (delivered 1899–1900)
- D-Class Granville (1890s)
- 70 E-Class Granville (delivered 1902–1903)
- 260 F-Class Granville (delivered 1899–1902)
- 195 R-Class Granville (delivered 1933–1935)
- 55 R1-Class Granville (delivered 1935)

=== Other non-rail related products ===
- Lawnmowers and lead batteries – 1930s
- Servicing aircraft, naval vessels
- Mining equipment
- Automobile parts and accessories
- Bulldozers
- Bus bodies
- Bridges (e.g. The Batemans Bay vertical lift bridge)
- Cranes
- Structural steel (e.g. trusses for the Peats Ferry Bridge)
- Air cargo
- Lorries
- Filtration Systems (e.g. fume hoods, dust extractors, air filters)
- Roller Doors
- Materials Handling Equipment
- Automobile Assembly Paint Lines

== Manufacturing Facilities ==
- Granville closed 1973
- Kelso opened early 1970s, closed before 2014
- Somerton
- Eagle Farm closed 1995
- Rosewater opened 1974, closed April 1986
- Forrestfield established in 1997 to assemble the Westrail Q and S classes, closed 1998

=== Non rail products ===
- Woodville North – Clyde Apac Industries (Air filtration systems, Lemcol materials handling systems, Selson air jacks)
- Revesby – B&D roller door systems
- Port Kembla – Clyde Carruthers

Because of capacity constraints, in the 1990s Clyde leased Australian National Industries' Braemar factory to fulfill its order for FreightCorp 82 class locomotives.
