= Westrail S class =

Class of Australian diesel locomotives

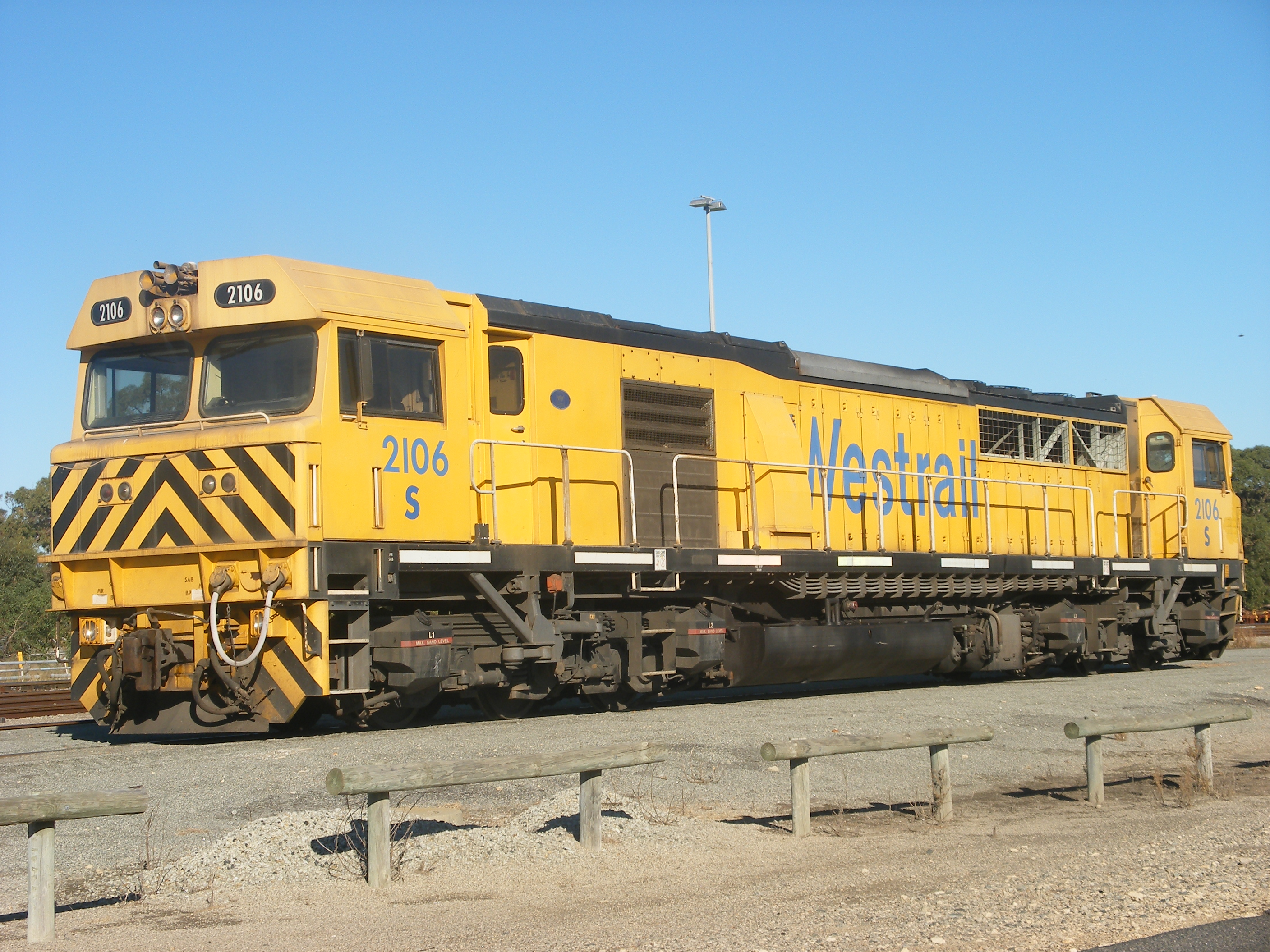
- S2106 in July 2008
Type and origin
- Power type: Diesel-electric
- Builder: Clyde Engineering, Forrestfield
- Model: Electro Motive Diesel JT42C
- Build date: 1998
- Total produced: 11
Specifications
- Configuration
  - AAR: C-C
  - UIC: Co-Co
- Gauge: 3 ft 6 in (1,067 mm)
- Length: 20.8 m (68 ft 3 in)
- Loco weight: 116 long tons (117.9 t; 129.9 short tons)
- Fuel type: Diesel
- Prime mover: Electro Motive Diesel 12N-710GB-ES
Performance figures
- Maximum speed: 115 km/h (71 mph)
- Power output: 3,010 hp (2,240 kW)
- Tractive effort: 74,440 lbf (331.1 kN)
Career
- Operators: Westrail
- Number in class: 11
- Numbers: S3301–S3311
- First run: 6 March 1998
- Current owner: Aurizon
- Disposition: 11 in service

The S class are a class of diesel locomotives built by Clyde Engineering, Forrestfield for Westrail in 1998.

== History ==
The S class were the first and only dual-cab locomotives purchased by Westrail. In May 1996 nine were ordered from Clyde Engineering as part of an order that also included 15 1,435 mm (4 ft 8 1/2 in) standard gauge Q class locomotives. The order later extended to eleven. They are an evolution of the FreightCorp 82 class. All were assembled at a facility established by Clyde Engineering within Westrail's Forrestfield Depot to fulfill the contract. The frames were built at Clyde's Somerton plant with other components manufactured at Kelso.

The S class locomotives entered service in June 1998 hauling ore and mineral trains in South West Western Australia. All were in service by November 1998

All were included in the sale of Westrail to Aurizon in December 2012, with the class redesignated as the 3300 class. In 2012, all were included in service operated by Aurizon.

In 2008, Rio Tinto ordered two standard gauge JT42Cs of the same design as the S class for the Weipa bauxite railway, numbered R1005 and R1006. They were delivered in 2009. R1005 remains in service today, while R1006 was withdrawn following a collision in September 2019. As of 2024, it was at the Progress Rail workshops in Port Augusta awaiting rebuilding.
