= 740 class =

740 class or Class 740 may refer to:

- FS Class 740, 2-8-0 steam locomotives
- South Australian Railways 740 class, 2-8-2 steam locomotives
