= B&D Australia =

Australian building products company

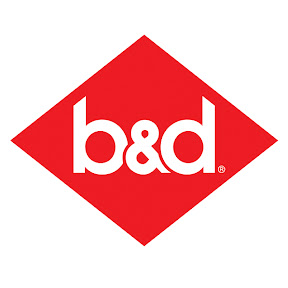
- Type: Private
- Industry: Garage door
- Founded: 1946
- Founder: Arthur Byrne and Paul Davidson
- Headquarters: Revesby, Australia
- Area served: Worldwide
- Products: Shutters and Doors
- Website: www.bnd.com.au

B&D Australia Pty Ltd. is an Australian company founded in 1946 that manufactures metal doors, sash, trim products, and shutters for residential and industrial garage doors and shutters.

== History ==
B&D was founded in 1946 as a steel fabricating business by Arthur Byrne and Paul Davidson with £140 in Botany, Sydney. In 1956 inventor Ben Saul designed and invented the original Roll-A-Door and then sold the idea to Byrne. Byrne and Davidson worked with boilermaker Gordon Lambert to debut the Roll-A-Door at the Daily Mirror Sydney Home Show in 1956. The door was made of compressed metal sheets fastened together and was the first all-steel door that could be rolled and unrolled without cracking. B&D introduced the slogan, "Even a child can open it" for a safe, secure garage door that would not slam shut and was easy to open.

In 1957 B&D founder Paul Davidson left the company and Ray Willoughby was appointed.

In the 1960s B&D went national, opening a factory in Melbourne and exporting the Roll-A-Door to New Zealand, and by 1963 the company was in the United States and Europe.

In 1985 Arthur Byrne and Ray Willoughby sold B&D to Clyde Industries and the company was renamed B&D Doors.

In 2000 B&D Doors sold the five millionth garage door worldwide, a figure that included more than 2.5 million Roll-A-Doors in Australia alone. In 2001 B&D was acquired by Queensland-based CSI Doors and Catalyst Investment Managers Proprietary Limited and, in 2003, acquired Automatic Technology Australia (ATA) to become Australia ’s largest door opener manufacturer. In 2004 it was bought by Australian company Alesco. In 2005 bought out its largest competitor in the New Zealand market, Dominator New Zealand, to become the largest door and opener manufacturer across Australasia. B&D was acquired by Dulux in 2012. In 2019, B&D's parent company Dulux was acquired by Nippon Paint, a Japanese multi-national paint and paint products manufacturer.

== Recognition ==
- Recognised by the National Museum of Australia as an Australian icon.
- Australia Post stamps for ‘Inventive Australia’
- New advert – A lion is the only alternative.
- 1969 - Moon landing advert.

== Philanthropy ==
The Cure Cancer Foundation of Australia (Cure Cancer Australia) was founded by B&D founder Arthur Byrne in 1979.
