= Commonwealth Railways L class =

Class of Australian 2-8-2 locomotives

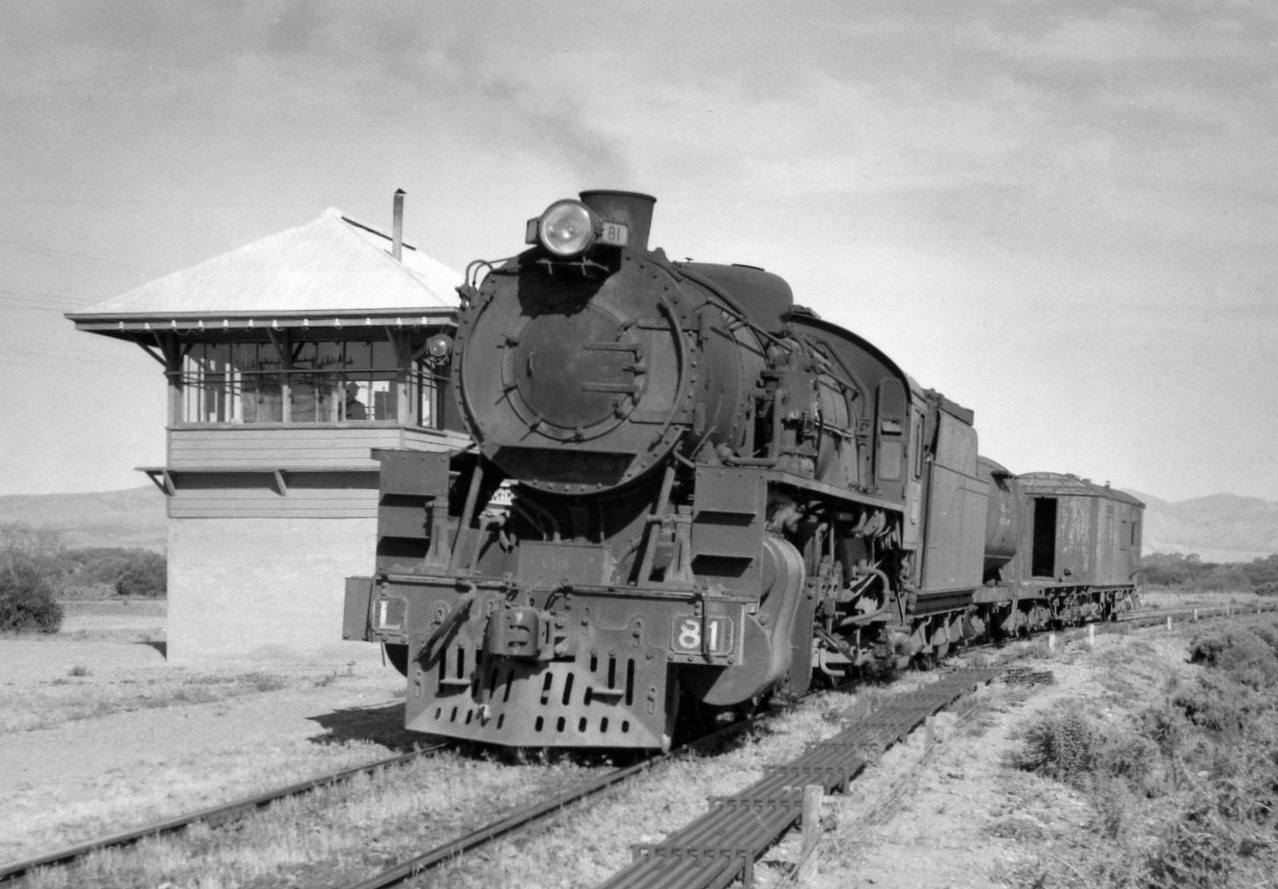
Type and origin
- Power type: Steam
- Builder: Clyde Engineering
- Build date: 1951–1952
- Total produced: 10
Specifications
- Configuration
  - Whyte: 2-8-2
- Gauge: 1,435 mm (4 ft 8 1/2 in) standard gauge
- Loco weight: 165 long tons (168 t; 185 short tons)
- Fuel type: Coal
- Firebox
  - Grate area: 47 sq ft (4.4 m^{2})
- Boiler pressure: 200 psi (14 bar; 1,379 kPa)
- Cylinder size: 22 in × 28 in (559 mm × 711 mm)
Performance figures
- Tractive effort: 40,418 lbf (179.79 kN)
Career
- Operators: Commonwealth Railways
- Numbers: L80-L89
- Withdrawn: May 1959
- Scrapped: Mid 1960
- Disposition: All scrapped

The Commonwealth Railways L class was a class of 2-8-2 freight locomotives built in 1951–1952 by Clyde Engineering, Granville, for the Commonwealth Railways, Australia.

== History ==
In the late 1940s, the federal government placed an order with Clyde Engineering, Granville for fifty 2-8-2 locomotives. These were ordered as part of Australia's contribution to the United Nations Relief and Rehabilitation Administration rehabilitation of China. With the first locomotives under construction, China fell to the Communists and Australia's obligations ceased.

The government was able to renegotiate the contract, with only twenty built. Ten were taken by the Commonwealth Railways, even though it already had diesel locomotives on order, with the other ten going to the South Australian Railways as the 740 class. Some were immediately placed on the scrap line at Port Augusta and never entered service. All were officially withdrawn by May 1959. They were scrapped in the mid-1960s with the boilers sold overseas.

Some of the tenders were converted into water carriers for use on the Commonwealth Railways weed killer train, still being in use in the early 1980s.
