= Bell Bay aluminium smelter =

Aluminium smelter in Tasmania, Australia

Coordinates: 41°07′26″S 146°52′08″E

The Bell Bay aluminium smelter is located on the Tamar River at Bell Bay, Tasmania, Australia. The smelter has a production capacity of 178,000 tonnes of aluminium per year. It is owned and operated by Pacific Aluminium, a wholly owned subsidiary of Rio Tinto Alcan.

== History ==
The Bell Bay smelter commenced production in 1955 as a joint venture between the Commonwealth and Tasmanian governments. The smelter was the first built in the Southern Hemisphere primarily to overcome difficulties importing aluminium during wartime. Bell Bay was chosen as the location because of the available hydroelectric power and deep water facilities. Rio Tinto Aluminium purchased the smelter in 1960, when production was about 12,000 tonnes per year. The original potline (Line 1) used British Aluminium Söderberg technology. It was converted to use prebake anodes in 1965 and shut down in 1981.

The smelter had financial loss of $35 million in 2023, and lost $18.5 million in 2024. It had a 10-year electricity contract with Hydro Tasmania expiring at the end of 2025. Power consumption could reach 355 MW.

== Technology ==
The smelter currently comprises three potlines of Kaiser P-57 reduction cells

Line 2 and Line 3 were built in the early 1960s. Line 4 was built in two stages in the early 1980s.

== See also ==
- Rio Tinto Aluminium
- Aluminium smelting
- List of aluminium smelters
