= P-class submarine =

P-class submarine may refer to:

- Parthian-class submarine, of the Royal Navy
- Porpoise-class submarine, of the Royal Navy
- Pravda-class submarine, of the Soviet Navy
- Porpoise-class submarine, of the United States Navy
