= Rio Tinto Aluminium =

- Founded: 1956 (as Comalco)
- Headquarters: Australia
- Products: Aluminium
- Parent: Rio Tinto Group

Rio Tinto Aluminium (RTA), previously known as Comalco (Commonwealth Aluminium Corporation Pty Ltd), are historic companies, which were absorbed into what is now Rio Tinto Alcan, headquartered in Montreal, Canada. The companies' business is focused on bauxite, alumina, and primary aluminium.

== History ==
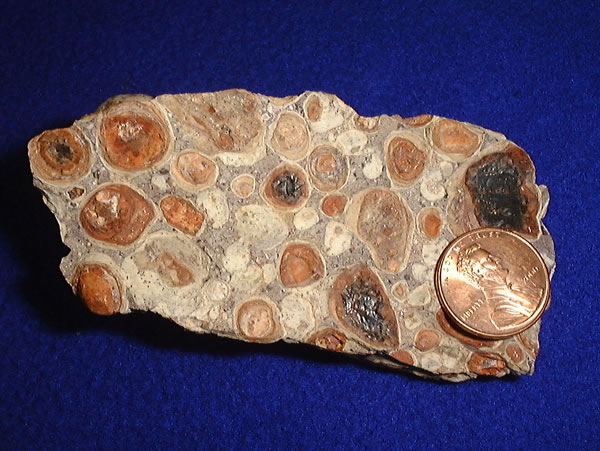
Rio Tinto Alcan is the world's leading producer of bauxite (shown here with a US cent for scale)

In 1956 the Australian Government formed the Commonwealth Aluminium Corporation Pty Ltd to develop bauxite deposits at Weipa, in Queensland. In 1957, it entered into a partnership with British Aluminium Company, but this company withdrew from the partnership in 1960. Comalco then entered a partnership with Consolidated Zinc Corporation Ltd and Kaiser Aluminium & Chemical Corporation, at which time it rebranded as Comalco Industries Pty Ltd, which was registered Victoria on 15 December 1960.

Comalco mined bauxite at Weipa and Aurukun, and operated aluminium smelters at three locations: Bell Bay, Queensland; Gladstone, Tasmania; and Bluff, in New Zealand. In 1962 Kaiser Aluminium sold its shares in Comalco to Conzinc Riotinto of Australia (CRA) and other companies.

The company listed on the stock exchange as Comalco Ltd in 1970 and issued a small shareholding to the public. Rio Tinto later acquired the remaining shares, and the company was delisted, becoming a wholly-owned subsidiary of Rio Tinto Ltd.

On 14 November 2007, Rio Tinto completed its largest acquisition to date, purchasing Canadian aluminium company Alcan for $38.1 billion, The new division was renamed Rio Tinto Alcan, with its headquarters situated in Montreal. Combined with Rio Tinto's existing aluminium-related assets, the new aluminium division vaulted to the world number-one producer of bauxite, alumina and aluminium.

== Description ==
Rio Tinto Alcan owns the Weipa bauxite mine, Yarwun Alumina Refinery, and Bell Bay aluminium smelter.

It also has or had interests (manages or joint-venture) in other aluminium related businesses:

- Boyne Smelters Ltd (aluminium smelter)
- New Zealand Aluminium Smelters Limited (Tiwai Point aluminium smelter)
- Queensland Alumina Limited (alumina refinery)
- Gladstone Power Station (power station)
- Anglesey Aluminium (aluminium smelter – closed September 2009)
- Eurallumina SpA (alumina refinery)(Now sold)

== Weipa railway fleet ==
In January 1972, Comalco (as the company was then known) ordered two GT26C locomotives to the same design as the Western Australian Government Railways L class (albeit without dynamic brakes), numbered 1.001 and 1.002. A switcher was also imported from Canada, numbered 1.003. In 1994, 1.002 was sold to Westrail and renumbered L276, and would later go on to have dynamic brakes retrofitted, also being renumbered LZ3120. The railway also acquired a prototype JT42C, GML10, from BHP, which was renumbered R1004 (1.001 was also renumbered R1001). In 2009, both R1001 and R1004 were sold to railways on the East Coast of Australia (1001 to El Zorro [renumbered L277] and 1004 to Qube [reverted to its original GML10 designation]), and were replaced by two production-model JT42Cs, R1005 and R1006. 1.003 was scrapped in 2000 after years of disuse.

R1006 was withdrawn and scrapped following a collision in September 2019.

== Litigation ==
- Commonwealth Aluminium Corporation Ltd v Attorney-General of Queensland [1976] Qd R 231 (Comalco Case)

== See also ==
- List of alumina refineries
- Nabalco (also now part of Rio Tinto Alcan)
