= New South Wales 82 class locomotive =

Class of diesel locomotives

New South Wales 82 class
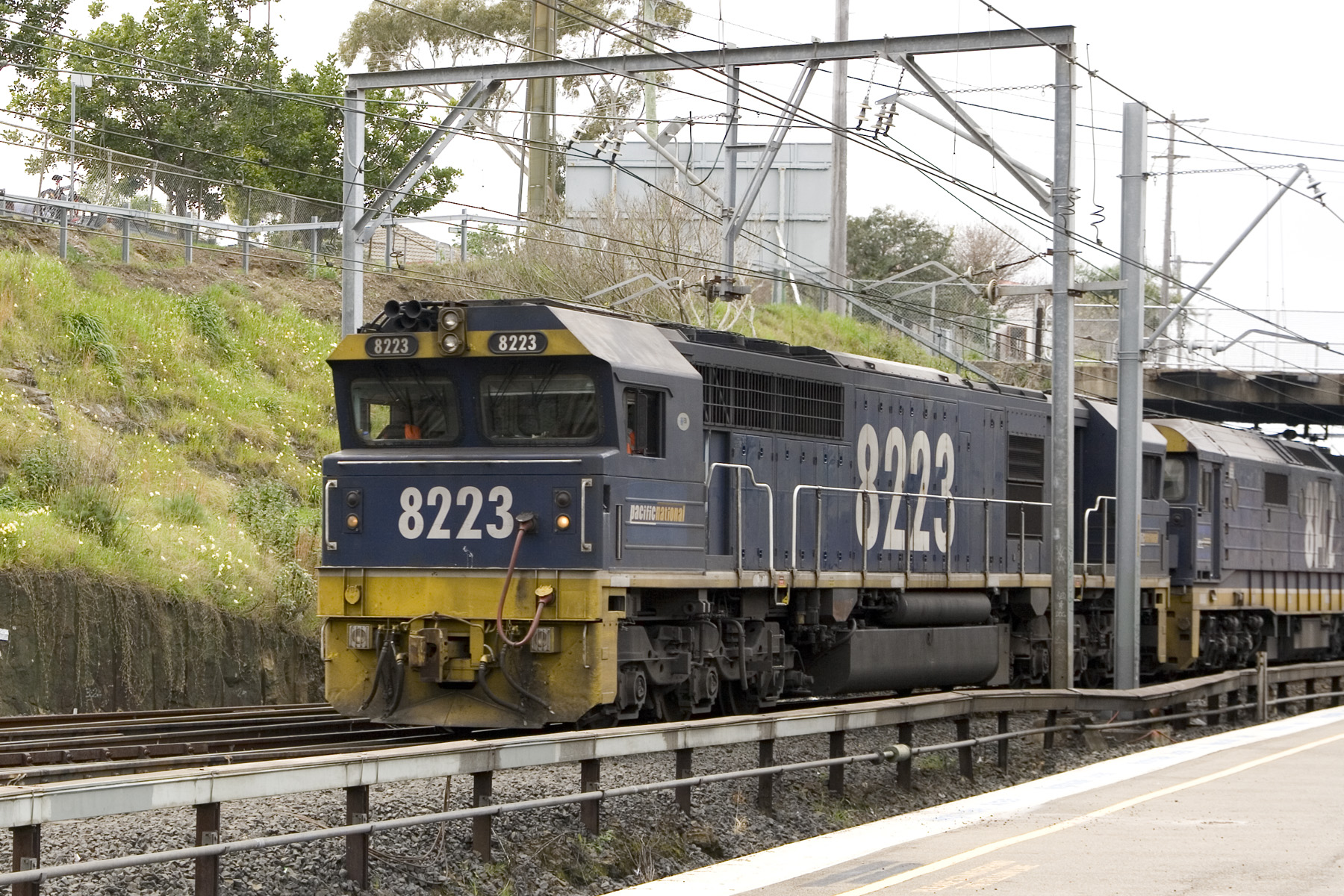
- 82 class locomotive in Sydney in 2007
Type and origin
- Power type: Diesel-electric
- Builder: Clyde Engineering, Braemar
- Serial number: 94-1308 to 94-1340; 95-1341 to 95-1365
- Model: EMD JT42C
- Build date: 1994–1995
- Total produced: 58
Specifications
- Configuration
  - AAR: C'C
  - UIC: Co-Co
- Gauge: 1,435 mm (4 ft 8 1/2 in) standard gauge
- Length: 22 m (72 ft 2 1/8 in)
- Axle load: 22 t
- Loco weight: 132 t (130 long tons; 146 short tons)
- Fuel type: Diesel
- Fuel capacity: 10000 L as built (some units have subsequently been restricted to 8000 L capacity)
- Prime mover: EMD 12-710G3A
- Engine type: 12-cylinder two-cycle diesel
- Aspiration: Turbochargers
- Displacement: 139 L
- Alternator: EMD AR11
- Traction motors: EMD D87ETR
- Cylinders: 12
- Transmission: DC Electric
- MU working: AAR 27-pin modified
- Train heating: No
- Loco brake: Air and Dynamic brake
- Train brakes: Air
- Safety systems: Driver Vigilance control device
Performance figures
- Maximum speed: 121 km/h (75 mph)
- Power output: 3,030 hp (2,260 kW)
Career
- Operators: Pacific National
- Number in class: 58
- Numbers: 8201–8258
- Delivered: 1994
- First run: 1994
- Last run: 1995
- Current owner: Pacific National
- Disposition: 54 in service, 4 scrapped

The 82 class is a class of diesel locomotives built by Clyde Engineering, Braemar for The New South Wales State Rail Authority's FreightRail division (FreightCorp from 1996) in 1994–1995. The sale of FreightCorp and its assets along with National Rail in 2002 saw ownership of all 55 remaining 82 class locomotives (three units had already been destroyed in a major collision at Beresfield train station in 1997) transferred to the newly formed Pacific National and patched over with its logos. As of October 2024, all but one of these locomotives remains in active service with Pacific National, one having been scrapped in 2016 after sustaining significant fire damage.

== History ==
In 1992, a fleet of 55 EMD JT42C locomotives was ordered from Clyde Engineering, which was later increased to 58. The design was based on the prototype locomotive GML10 built by Clyde Engineering, Kelso in 1990. They have two cabs, built in a hood style. They were originally to be built at Kelso, but a lack of capacity saw Clyde Engineering lease Australian National Industries' Braemar plant.

Early artists' impressions showed them numbered as the 94 class. The first two were originally numbered 9401 and 9402 but renumbered 8201 and 8202 before leaving the factory.

In October 1997, three were destroyed in the Beresfield rail accident (8219, 8246, 8247). The remaining 55 were included in the sale of FreightCorp to Pacific National in February 2002.

On 5 June 2014, 8221 caught fire near Awaba while running as the fourth locomotive on a loaded ER64 coal service. The locomotive was subsequently hauled to EDI Cardiff where examination was undertaken to determine the cause of the fire, ultimately being attributed to a fuel leak. Having suffered substantial damage, the locomotive remained stored at Cardiff for some time before being progressively stripped, and eventually scrapped, in October 2016.

Pacific National having lost a number of coal haulage contracts has seen the majority of the 82 class cascaded into other bulk haulage roles, with most now allocated to grain services throughout NSW and servicing various Boral contracts in the NSW Southern Highlands. They previously could also be seen on flour workings for the Manildra Group, however the cessation of Pacific National's contract hauling all Manildra traffic however has seen this work cease as of October 2024. Only a small number remain in coal traffic, with remaining Pacific National coal services now largely hauled by TT class locomotives.

== Liveries ==
The 82 class are being progressively repainted to Pacific National livery, commencing with 8202 in August 2016. As of May 2024, only 8211, 8242, 8250, 8251, 8253, 8254, 8256 & 8258 remain in FreightCorp blue, with the remaining 44 in Pacific National Blue & Yellow. Some variations exist; 8239 has a moustache on the cab for Movember, and 8224 had an RUOK decal on the long-hood briefly when it was in FreightCorp Blue.

== Fleet Status ==
Key:	In Service	Stored	Preserved	Converted	Under Overhaul	Scrapped

Locomotive	Name	Entered service	Out of service	Livery	Operator	Status	Notes
8201	-	1994		Pacific National Blue and Yellow	Pacific National	Operational	
8202	-	1994		Pacific National Blue and Yellow	Pacific National	Operational	
8203	-	1994		Pacific National Blue and Yellow	Pacific National	Operational	
8204	-	1994		Pacific National Blue and Yellow	Pacific National	Operational	
8205	-	1994		Pacific National Blue and Yellow	Pacific National	Operational	
8206	-	1994		Pacific National Blue and Yellow	Pacific National	Operational	
8207	-	1994		Pacific National Blue and Yellow	Pacific National	Operational	
8208	-	1994		Pacific National Blue and Yellow	Pacific National	Operational	
8209	-	1994		Pacific National Blue and Yellow	Pacific National	Operational	
8210	-	1994		Pacific National Blue and Yellow	Pacific National	Operational	
8211	-	1994		FreightCorp Blue	Pacific National	Operational	
8212	-	1994		Pacific National Blue and Yellow	Pacific National	Operational	
8213	-	1994		Pacific National Blue and Yellow	Pacific National	Operational	
8214	-	1994		Pacific National Blue and Yellow	Pacific National	Operational	
8215	-	1994		Pacific National Blue and Yellow	Pacific National	Operational	
8216	-	1994		Pacific National Blue and Yellow	Pacific National	Operational	
8217	-	1994		Pacific National Blue and Yellow	Pacific National	Operational	
8218	-	1994		Pacific National Blue and Yellow	Pacific National	Operational	
8219	-	1994	1997	FreightCorp Blue	FreightCorp	Scrapped	Accident In Beresfield
8220	-	1994		Pacific National Blue and Yellow	Pacific National	Operational	
8221	-	1994	2014	FreightCorp Blue	Pacific National	Scrapped	Accident In 2014
8222	-	1994		Pacific National Blue and Yellow	Pacific National	Operational	
8223	-	1994		Pacific National Blue and Yellow	Pacific National	Operational	
8224	-	1994		Pacific National Blue and Yellow	Pacific National	Operational	
8225	-	1994		Pacific National Blue and Yellow	Pacific National	Operational	
8226	-	1994		Pacific National Blue and Yellow	Pacific National	Operational	
8227	-	1994		Pacific National Blue and Yellow	Pacific National	Operational	
8228	-	1994		Pacific National Blue and Yellow	Pacific National	Operational	
8229	-	1994		Pacific National Blue and Yellow	Pacific National	Operational	
8230	-	1994		Pacific National Blue and Yellow	Pacific National	Operational	
8231	-	1994		Pacific National Blue and Yellow	Pacific National	Operational	
8232	-	1994		Pacific National Blue and Yellow	Pacific National	Operational	
8233	-	1994		Pacific National Blue and Yellow	Pacific National	Operational	
8234	-	1994		Pacific National Blue and Yellow	Pacific National	Operational	
8235	-	1994		Pacific National Blue and Yellow	Pacific National	Operational	
8236	-	1994		Pacific National Blue and Yellow	Pacific National	Operational	
8237	-	1994		Pacific National Blue and Yellow	Pacific National	Operational	
8238	-	1994		Pacific National Blue and Yellow	Pacific National	Operational	
8239	-	1994		Pacific National Blue and Yellow	Pacific National	Operational	
8240	-	1995		Pacific National Blue and Yellow	Pacific National	Operational	
8241	-	1995		Pacific National Blue and Yellow	Pacific National	Operational	
8242	-	1995		FreightCorp Blue	Pacific National	Operational	
8243	-	1995		Pacific National Blue and Yellow	Pacific National	Operational	
8244	-	1995		Pacific National Blue and Yellow	Pacific National	Operational	
8245	-	1995		Pacific National Blue and Yellow	Pacific National	Operational	
8246	-	1995	1997	FreightCorp Blue	FreightCorp	Scrapped	Accident In Beresfield
8247	-	1995	1997	FreightCorp Blue	FreightCorp	Scrapped	Accident In Beresfield
8248	-	1995		Pacific National Blue and Yellow	Pacific National	Operational	
8249	-	1995		Pacific National Blue and Yellow	Pacific National	Operational	
8250	-	1995		FreightCorp Blue	Pacific National	Operational	
8251	-	1995		FreightCorp Blue	Pacific National	Operational	
8252	-	1995		Pacific National Blue and Yellow	Pacific National	Operational	
8253	-	1995		FreightCorp Blue	Pacific National	Operational	
8254	-	1995		FreightCorp Blue	Pacific National	Operational	
8255	-	1995		Pacific National Blue and Yellow	Pacific National	Operational	
8256	-	1995		Pacific National Blue and Yellow	Pacific National	Operational	
8257	-	1995		Pacific National Blue and Yellow	Pacific National	Operational	
8258	-	1995		Pacific National Blue and Yellow	Pacific National	Operational	
