= South Australian Railways 740 class =

Class of Australian steam locomotives

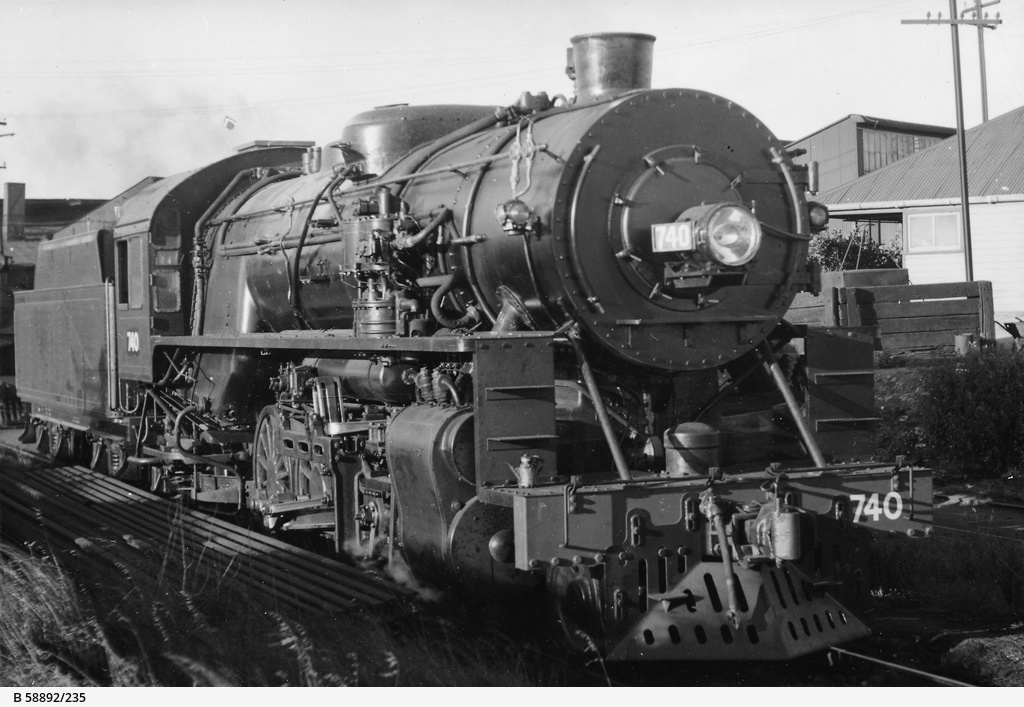
- 740 at Mile End in March 1952
Type and origin
- Power type: Steam
- Builder: Clyde Engineering
- Serial number: 520-533
- Build date: 1951-1953
- Total produced: 10
Specifications
- Configuration
  - Whyte: 2-8-2 1′D1′ 2′2′
- Gauge: 1,600 mm (5 ft 3 in)
- Leading dia.: 2 ft 9 in (838 mm)
- Driver dia.: 4 ft 9 in (1,448 mm)
- Trailing dia.: 3 ft 6 in (1,067 mm)
- Length: 73 ft 1 1/2 in (22.29 m)
- Height: 14 ft 0 in (4,254.5 mm)
- Axle load: 17 long tons 17 cwt (40,000 lb or 18.1 t)
- Loco weight: 93.95 long tons 0 cwt (210,400 lb or 95.5 t)
- Tender weight: 71.10 long tons 0 cwt (159,300 lb or 72.2 t)
- Total weight: 165 long tons 1 cwt (369,700 lb or 167.7 t)
- Fuel type: Coal
- Fuel capacity: 10 long tons 0 cwt (22,400 lb or 10.2 t)
- Water cap.: 6,350 imp gal (7,630 US gal; 28,900 L)
- Firebox
  - Grate area: 47 sq ft (4.4 m^{2})
- Boiler pressure: 200 psi (1,379 kPa)
- Heating surface
  - Firebox: 194 sq ft (18.0 m^{2})
  - Tubes: 2,400 sq ft (220 m^{2})
- Superheater
  - Heating area: 620 sq ft (58 m^{2})
- Cylinders: 2
- Cylinder size: 22 in × 28 in (559 mm × 711 mm)
- Valve gear: Walschaerts
- Valve type: Piston
Performance figures
- Tractive effort: 40,454 lbf (179,950 N)
- Factor of adh.: 3.81
Career
- Operators: South Australian Railways
- Class: 740
- Number in class: 10
- Numbers: 740-749
- First run: 1/3/1952
- Withdrawn: 1963-1965
- Scrapped: 1963-1966
- Disposition: All scrapped

The South Australian Railways 740 class was a class of 2-8-2 freight locomotives built by Clyde Engineering, Granville for the South Australian Railways in 1951–1952.

== History ==
In the late 1940s, the federal government placed an order with Clyde Engineering, Granville for fifty 2-8-2 locomotives. These were ordered as part of Australia's contribution to the United Nations Relief and Rehabilitation Administration rehabilitation of China. With the first locomotives under construction, China fell to the Communists and Australia's obligations ceased.

The government was able to renegotiate the contract, with only twenty built. Ten were taken by the Commonwealth Railways as the L class, with the other ten going to the South Australian Railways as the 740 class after being converted for broad gauge operation. The 740 class remained in service until the early 1960s when replaced by diesels. The last was condemned in November 1965.
