= Tasmanian Government Railways P class =

Type and origin
- Power type: Steam
- Builder: Clyde Engineering
- Serial number: 241
- Build date: 1919
- Total produced: 1
Specifications
- Configuration
  - Whyte: 2-6-2T
- Gauge: 1,067 mm (3 ft 6 in)
- Driver dia.: 3 ft 6 in (1,067 mm)
- Trailing dia.: 2 ft 2 in (660 mm)
- Wheelbase: 23 ft 0 in (7,010 mm)
- Length: 35 ft 3 in (10,744 mm) over cowcatchers
- Total weight: 98 long tons 2 cwt (219,700 lb or 99.7 t)
- Fuel type: Coal
- Cylinder size: 20 in × 24 in (508 mm × 610 mm)
- Train brakes: Vacuum
Performance figures
- Tractive effort: 15,244 lbf (67.81 kN)
Career
- Operators: Tasmanian Government Railways
- Numbers: P1
- Locale: Launceston
- Delivered: Early 1921
- First run: 14 April 1921
- Retired: Between 1941 and 1945
- Disposition: Scrapped

The Tasmanian Government Railways P Class was a 2-6-2T locomotive bought second hand from a timber company in New South Wales. It was withdrawn in c.1941; having spent the majority of its service in or around Launceston Workshops and Yards.

== Industrial Service ==
The locomotive was built in 1919 at the Clyde Engineering works in Sydney for the Allen Taylor & Company that operated a 1067 mm bush tramway on the Mid North Coast from Myall Lakes through Wootton and over the Pacific Highway to timber leases at Coolongoolook. The locomotive was named Wootton and commenced service in January 1920. However, it proved too heavy for the line and within a year it was put up for sale.

At the same time, the Tasmanian Government Railways (TGR) was short of rolling stock and locomotives. The sale of a virtually new locomotive attracted their interest and it was purchased sometime between late 1920 and early 1921.

== Tasmanian Government Railways ==
After some modifications and the numbering of P1, the locomotive was put into service on 14 April 1921, wearing a lined black livery. It had been hoped to use it on the Ulverstone - Nietta line, but was deemed unsuitable; it was subsequently employed on an extension of the route from Myalla to Wiltshire, but again failed to make an impression. The TGR therefore attempted to sell the locomotive later that year.

Thereafter, P1 worked as a shunter around the Launceston roundhouse and workshops, accruing low mileage. It was overhauled in 1927 and 1932 and, according to uncorroborated word of mouth recollections, may have run Melrose branch on limestone trains.

It is not known when the locomotive was withdrawn, as it is not mentioned in any official documents until 31 January 1945 when it was proposed for written off. It was dumped at Launceston until February 1951, when it was transferred to Mowbray in October that year and sold for scrap. The actual date of scrapping is not known.
