= Weipa bauxite mine =

Bauxite mine in Queensland, Australia

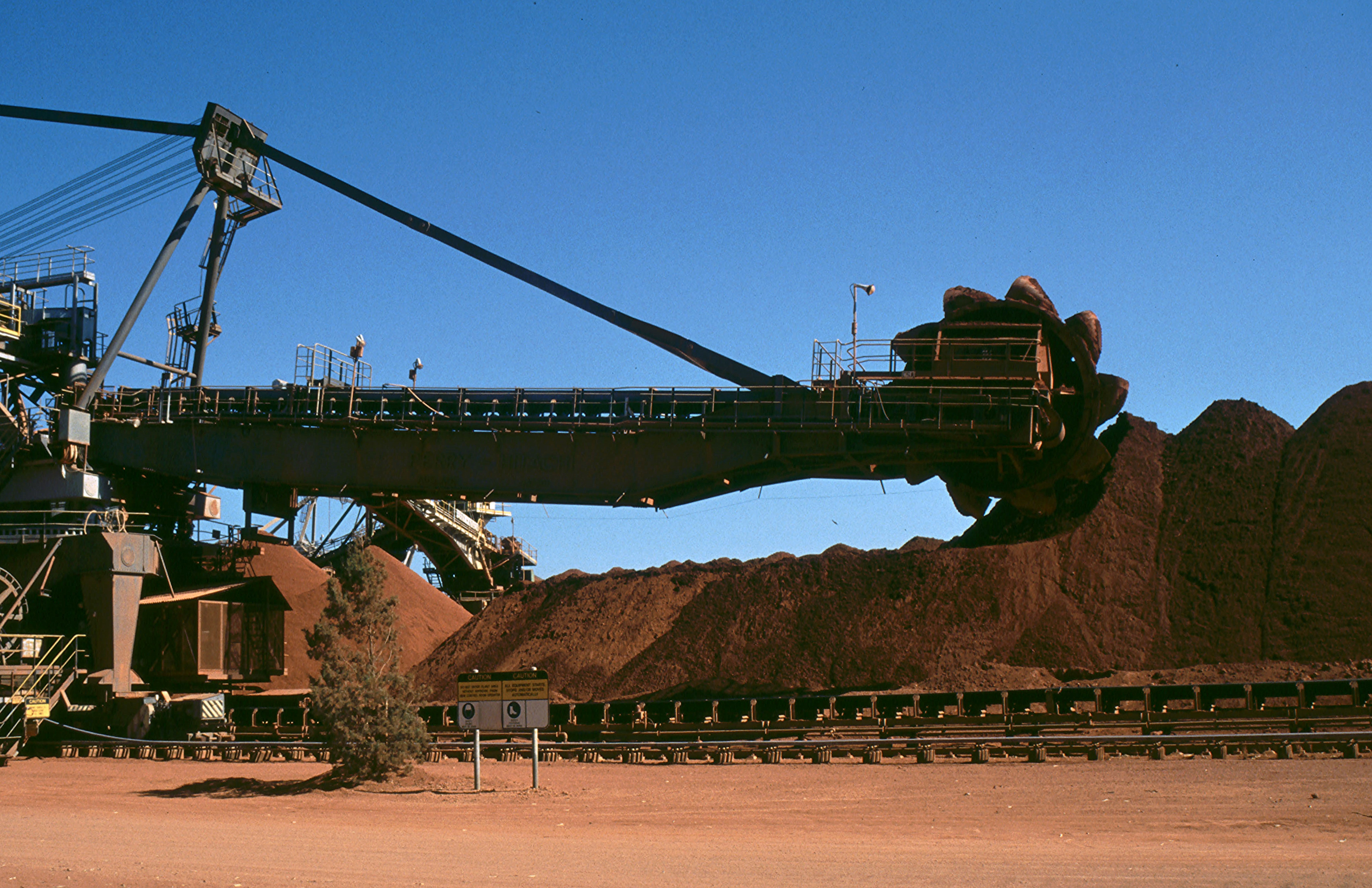
- Mining equipment at the mine, 1995
- Location: Queensland, Australia
- Products: Bauxite
- Production: 34.5 million tonnes
- Discovered: 1955
- Opened: 1963
- Company: Rio Tinto
- Website: www.riotinto.com/Operations/australia/weipa

The Weipa bauxite mine is a bauxite mine at Weipa on the western Cape York Peninsula in Far North Queensland, Australia. A geologist named Harry Evans discovered the vast bauxite resource in 1955. Operations commenced in 1963.

The mine is owned by Rio Tinto. Power to the mine is supplied via a 6.7MW solar photovoltaic solar farm on site. The ore is transported to the port via a 19 kilometre Standard Gauge railway. The majority of the mined bauxite is sent to the Queensland Alumina Limited and Rio Tinto Aluminum Yarwun refineries, both located in Gladstone.

== History ==
Difficult market conditions lead to a nine per cent cut in production in 2009. In 2009, 16.3 million tonnes of bauxite was produced at the mine. In 2022, production totaled 34.5 million tonnes.

== See also ==
- Bauxite mining in Australia
- Mining in Australia
