= FreightCorp =

Former feight rail operator in New South Wales

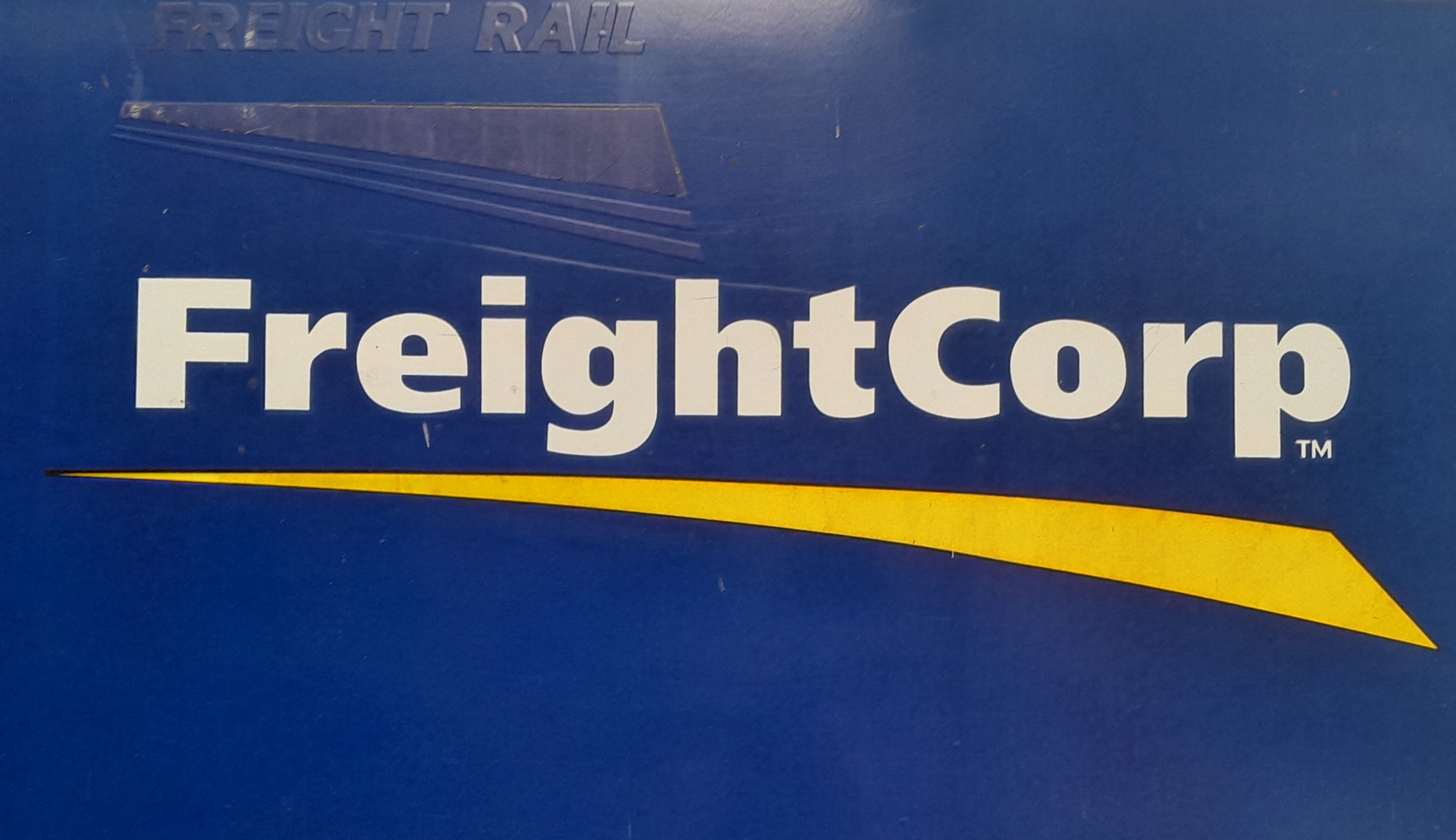
- Logo on an 86 class locomotive

State-owned corporation overview
- Formed: 16 January 1989
- Preceding state-owned corporation: State Rail Authority
- Dissolved: 31 January 2002
- Superseding state-owned corporation: Pacific National
- Jurisdiction: New South Wales
- Headquarters: Parramatta
- Minister responsible: Minister for Transport
- Parent state-owned corporation: State Rail Authority
- Key document: Transport Administration Act 1988 (NSW)

FreightCorp, formerly Freight Rail, was a railway operator owned by the Government of New South Wales, in Australia. It was responsible for intrastate and some interstate railway cargo handling from its foundation in January 1989 until its privatization in August 2002.

== History ==
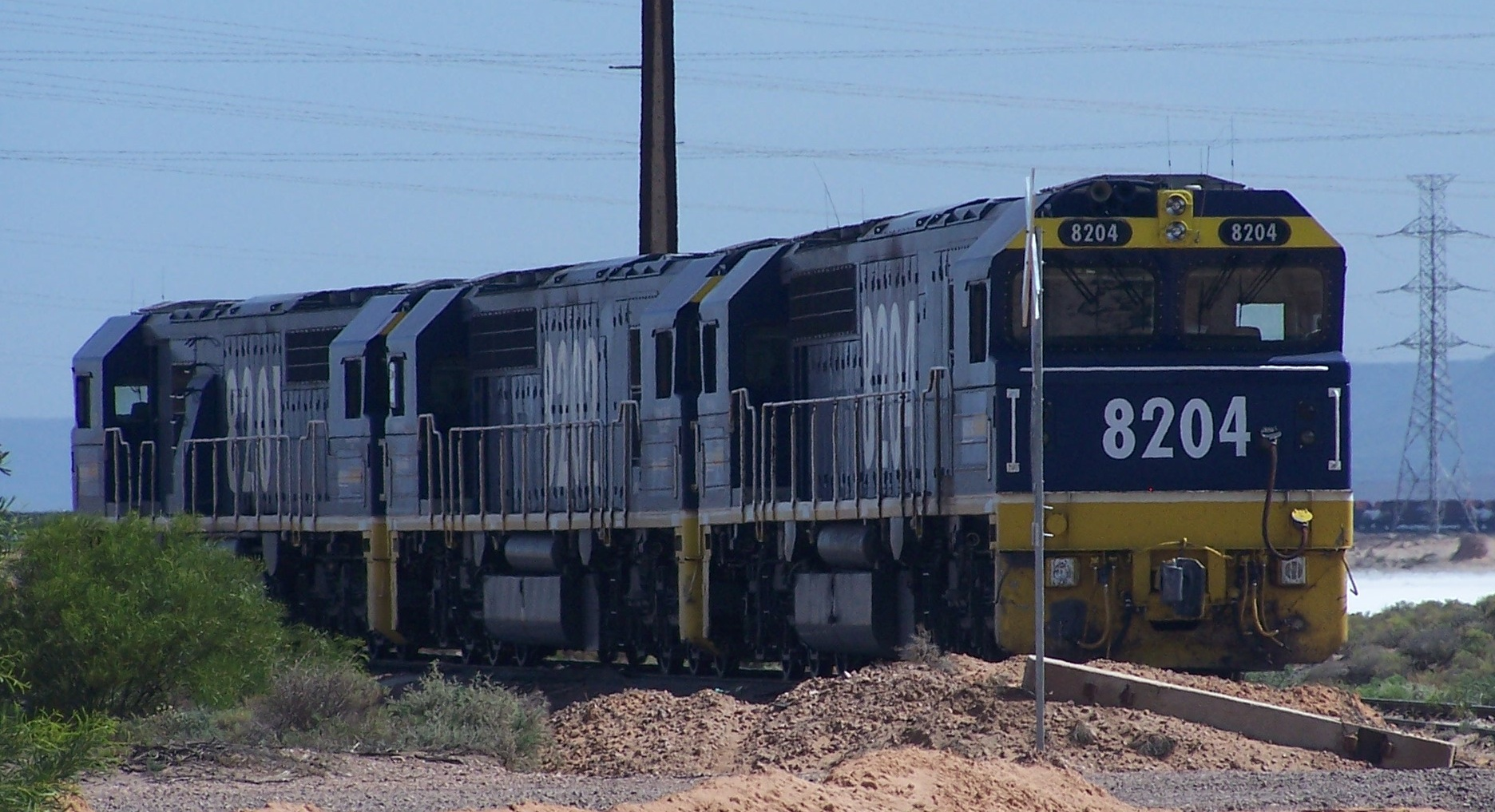
FreightCorp liveried 82 class locomotives at Port Augusta in December 2006

In January 1989, the freight operations of the State Rail Authority were transferred to Freight Rail pursuant to the Transport Administration Act 1988 (NSW).

On 1 July 1996, Freight Rail was corporatised. On 24 October 1996, Freight Rail was relaunched as FreightCorp.

On 1 February 2002, along with National Rail, FreightCorp was sold to a joint venture between Patrick Corporation and Toll Holdings as Pacific National.

== Operations ==
When established in 1989, Freight Rail was responsible for the operation of all rail freight services in New South Wales. It was also responsible for providing locomotives to haul passenger services for CityRail and CountryLink. Following the opening up of the New South Wales network to other operators, it began to face competition. Interstate services were transferred to National Rail in the mid-1990s. In 1999, it began to operate coal trains in South Australia on the Leigh Creek to Stirling North line to the Northern Power Station, Port Augusta.

== Fleet ==
Freight Rail inherited all of the State Rail Authority's locomotive fleet. In February 1992, it awarded contracts for fifty-eight 82 class and twenty-nine 90 class locomotives. These allowed it to withdraw most of the 422, 44, 442, 45 and 49 class locomotives. After experimenting with a green and yellow livery, a dark blue, yellow and white livery was introduced in 1991.
