= UGL Rail C44aci =

Australian diesel electric locomotive

C44aci/C44ESaci
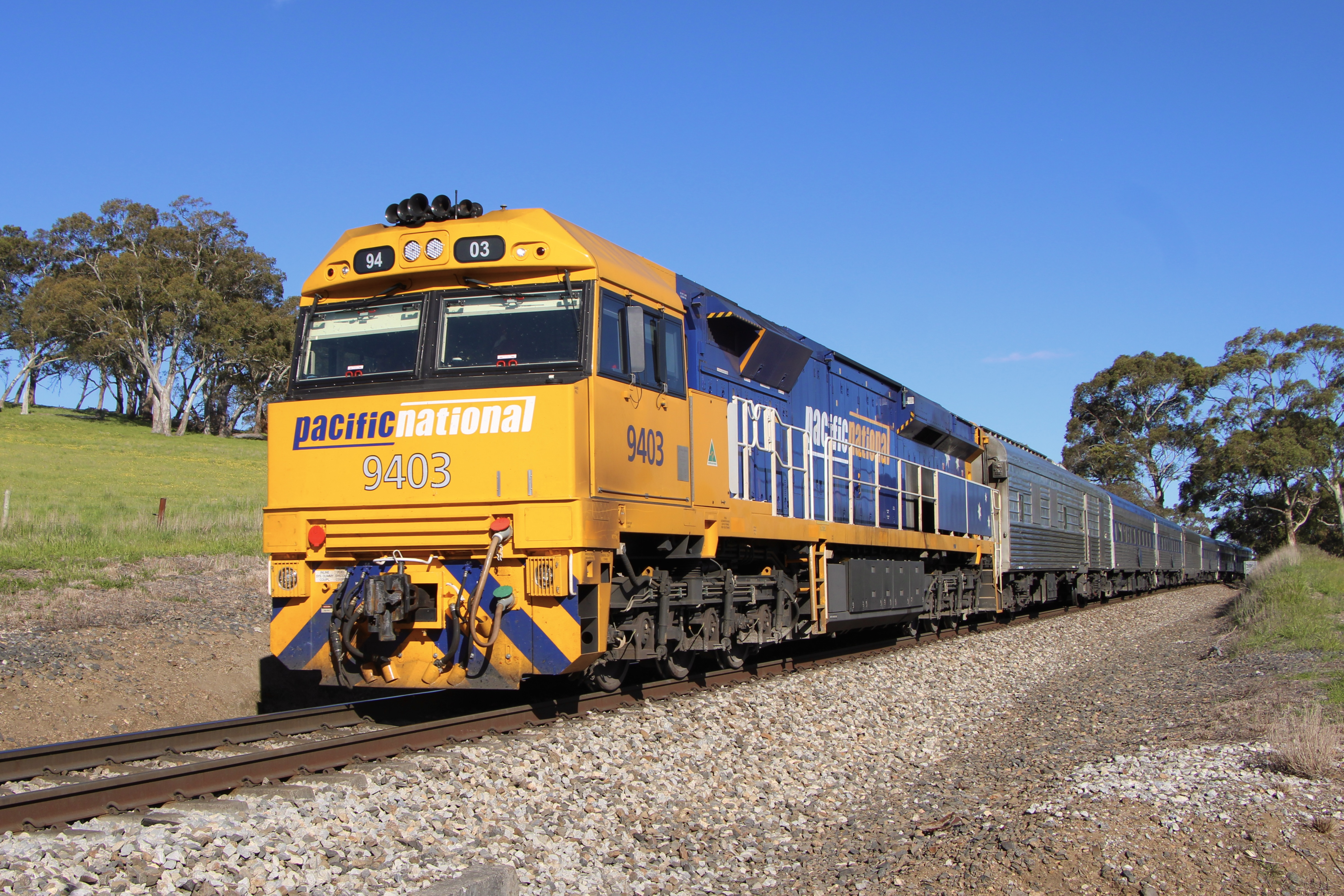
- Pacific National 94 class (C44ESaci) 9403 hauling The Overland at Mount Barker Junction, October 2025
Type and origin
- Power type: Diesel-Electric
- Builder: C44aci Series UGL Rail, Broadmeadow; C44ESACi = Underframe PT INKA, Madiun, Final UGL Rail, Broadmeadow
- Model: GE C44aci
- Build date: 2008-present
- Total produced: 233
Specifications
- Configuration
  - UIC: Co-Co
- Gauge: 1,435 mm (4 ft 8 1/2 in) standard gauge
- Length: 22.0 m (72 ft 2 in)
- Loco weight: 140 tonnes (high); 138 tonnes (med); 134 tonnes (low)
- Fuel type: Diesel
- Prime mover: GE 7FDL-16 GEVO-12
- Alternator: GE GMG192
- Traction motors: GE 5GEB30
- Cylinders: 16
Performance figures
- Maximum speed: 115 km/h (71 mph)
- Power output: Pre-2010 Gross BHP: 4,400 hp (3,300 kW); Pre-2010 Nett THP: 4,264 hp (3,180 kW) 2010- onwards Gross BHP: 4,500 hp (3,400 kW); 2010- onwards Nett THP: 4,356 hp (3,248 kW)
- Tractive effort: 565 kN (127,000 lbf)
Career
- Operators: Aurizon; East Coast Rail; Pacific National; Qube Holdings; Rail First Asset Management; Southern Shorthaul Railroad
- Delivered: 2008
- First run: 2008
- Current owner: Aurizon; Centennial Coal; Fletchers International Exports; Southern Shorthaul Railroad; Pacific National; Qube Holdings; Rail First Asset Management; East Coast Rail
- Disposition: 233 in service

The C44aci and C44ESACi are two models of Australian heavy duty diesel electric locomotive designed by UGL Rail and built at the Broadmeadow factory. They are operated by a number of rail freight operators. The design is based on the National Rail NR class but with some modifications and upgraded features.

== Design ==
The C44aci (initially designated as C43aci) was designed by UGL Rail in response to a tender issued by Pacific National, who required a locomotive to match the performance of their existing 90 class units when hauling heavy coal traffic, while still having the ability to work high speed intermodal services, with the change between applications to be simple.

The existing Cv40-9i (NR class) locomotive design was used as a base, but with alterations including:

- Higher horsepower prime mover
- Smaller main alternator
- Enlarged radiator size now overhangs the walkway at the number 2 end to cope with the more powerful engine cooling & improve air to water aftercooling
- AC traction motor allowing an increase in haulage capacity
- Addition of inline refuelling fittings
- Isolated cab for reduced noise and vibration
- A new design of fabricated bogies
- Increased use of modular construction
- Revised transition curves in the underframe to reduce the probability of fatigue cracking
- Various body and cab modifications
- A brand-new Nathan K5UL-AU-LS horn.

The NR class design had also been used as a basis for the AC traction QR National 5000 class introduced in 2005. This design did not meet the requirements for Pacific National due to the heavy axle load, acceptable on the heavily laid coal routes, but not on lines outside of the Hunter Valley.

To reduce the weight, the level of fuel carried is altered: for intermodal applications the fuel level is 7,300 litres, for coal applications that permit higher axle loads the fuel level is increased to 13,500 litres, with an intermediate fuel level of 10,750 litres also available. These limits are enforced during refuelling by a float switch in the tank, the permitted level being set by a key switch with an indication displayed in the cab if the limits are breached. The provision of inline refuelling permits the topping up of the tanks in transit from a separate tank wagon behind the locomotives.

The older GE Transportation FDL series engine was chosen instead of the newer GE Evolution Series engine used in the United States, due to the greater height not fitting in the restricted Australian loading gauge, and there being no legal requirement to meet stringent Tier 2 emissions standards which drove adoption of the GEVO series elsewhere. The C44aci has one inverter per traction motor, this differs from competing Downer EDi Rail locomotives that have only one inverter per bogie. A further difference between the C44aci and the competing GT46C ACe is the lack of steering bogies to improve tracking properties and reduce the rate of wheel wear, instead fixed-frame pedestal-type bogies are used where all three axles are always held parallel. However, QUBE's QL class were built with steering bogies included.

Simulation work showed that three C44aci locomotives could equal the performance of 90 class units in heavy mode, while in intermodal mode could outperform the older NR class units by 20% on services, with the same sectional running times and in some areas a slight reduction in fuel consumed due to the increased adhesion resulting from AC traction. However the 4400BHP C44aci was outperformed by the competitors 4500BHP GT46C-ACe locomotive produced by Downer EDi Rail in back-to-back trials performed by RailCorp on the steeply graded Cowan Bank.

== By operator ==
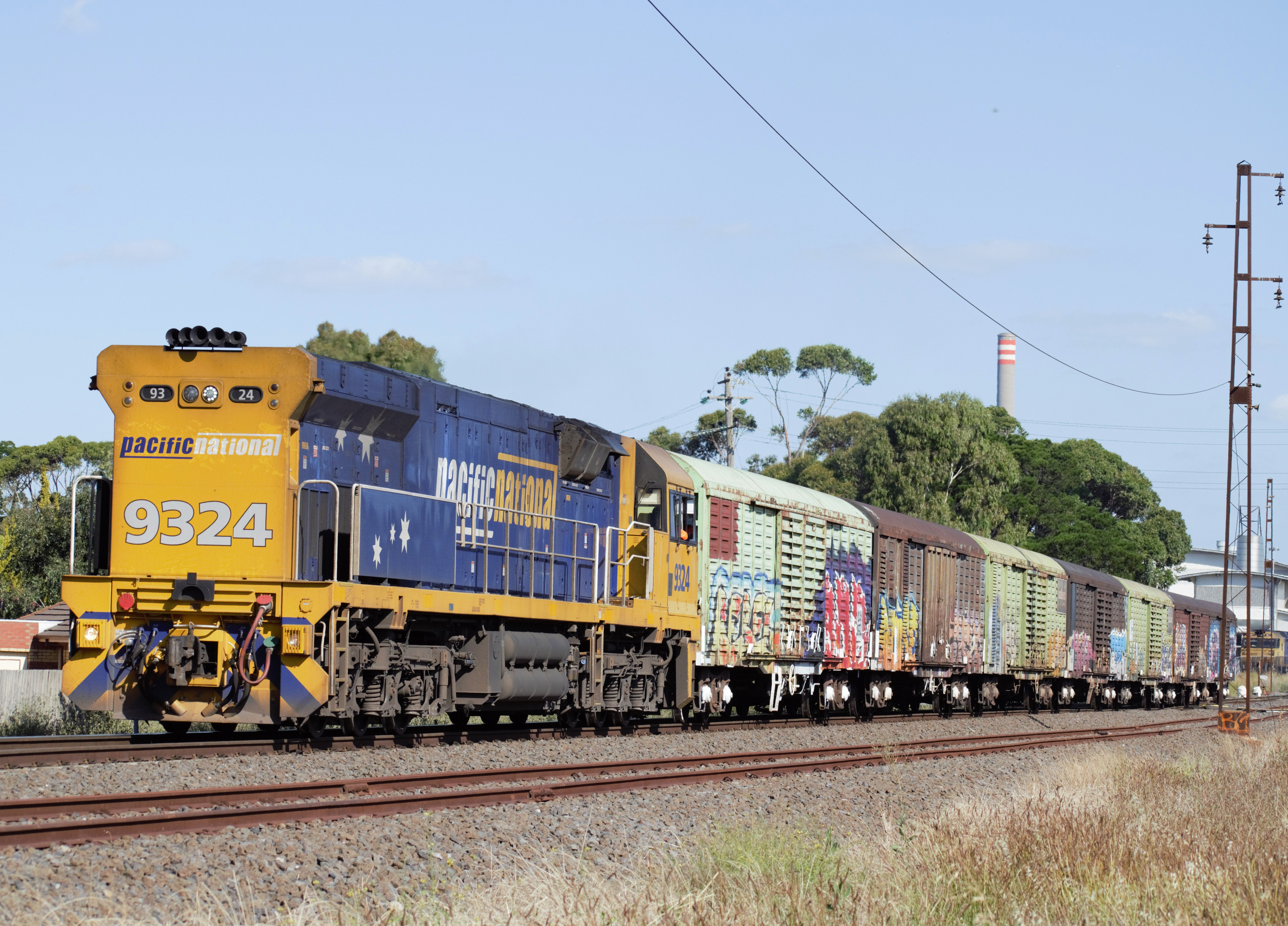
9324 on a Sadliers transfer at Spotswood

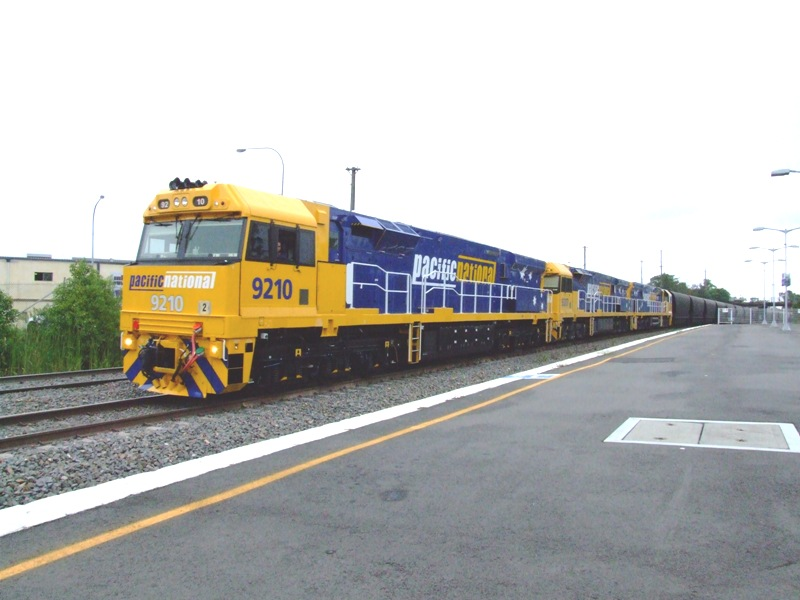
Pacific National 92 Class at East Maitland

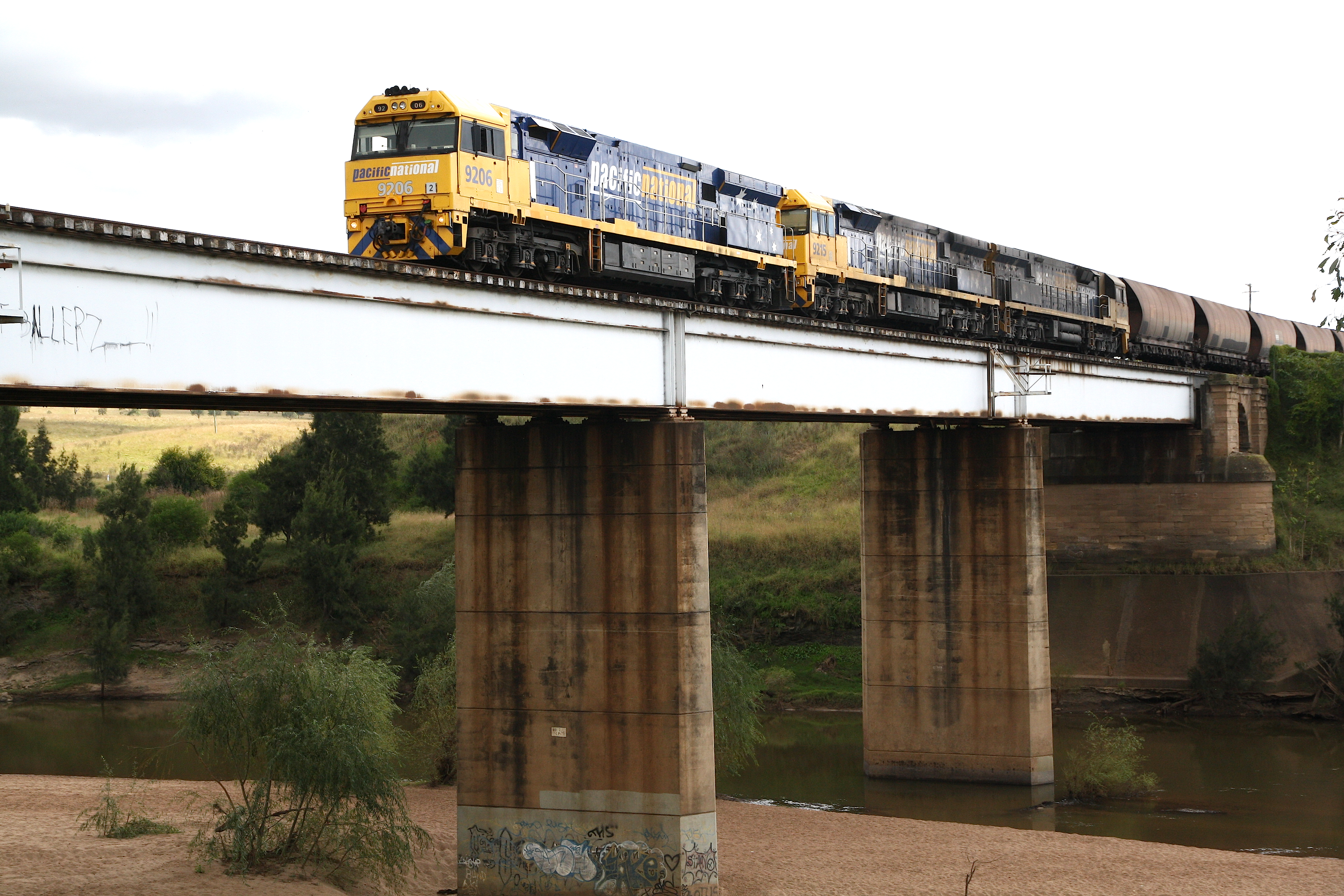
Triple-header 92 class coal train crossing the Hunter River at Singleton in April 2012

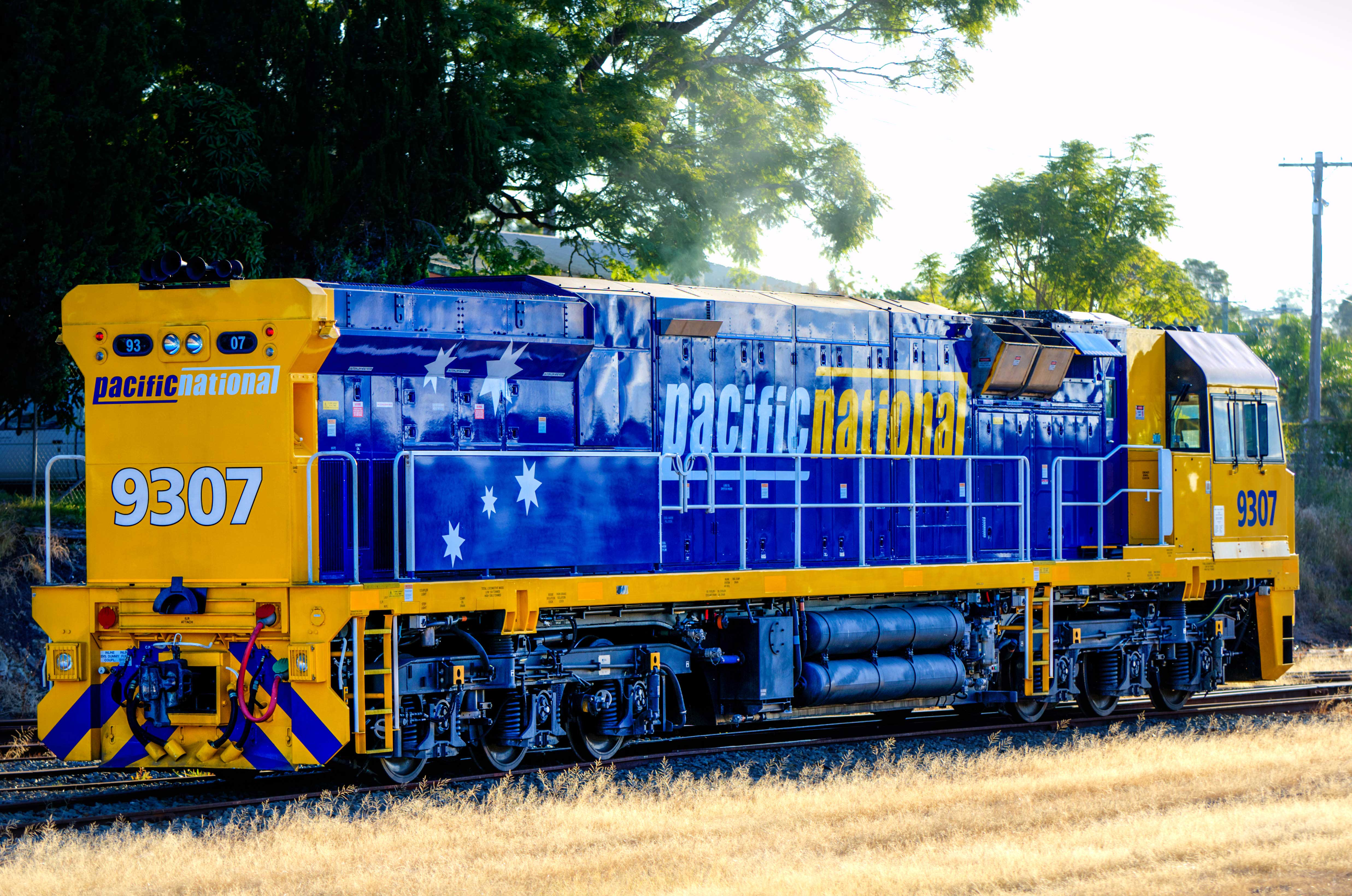
No 2 end of Pacific National 9307 at Taree in May 2013

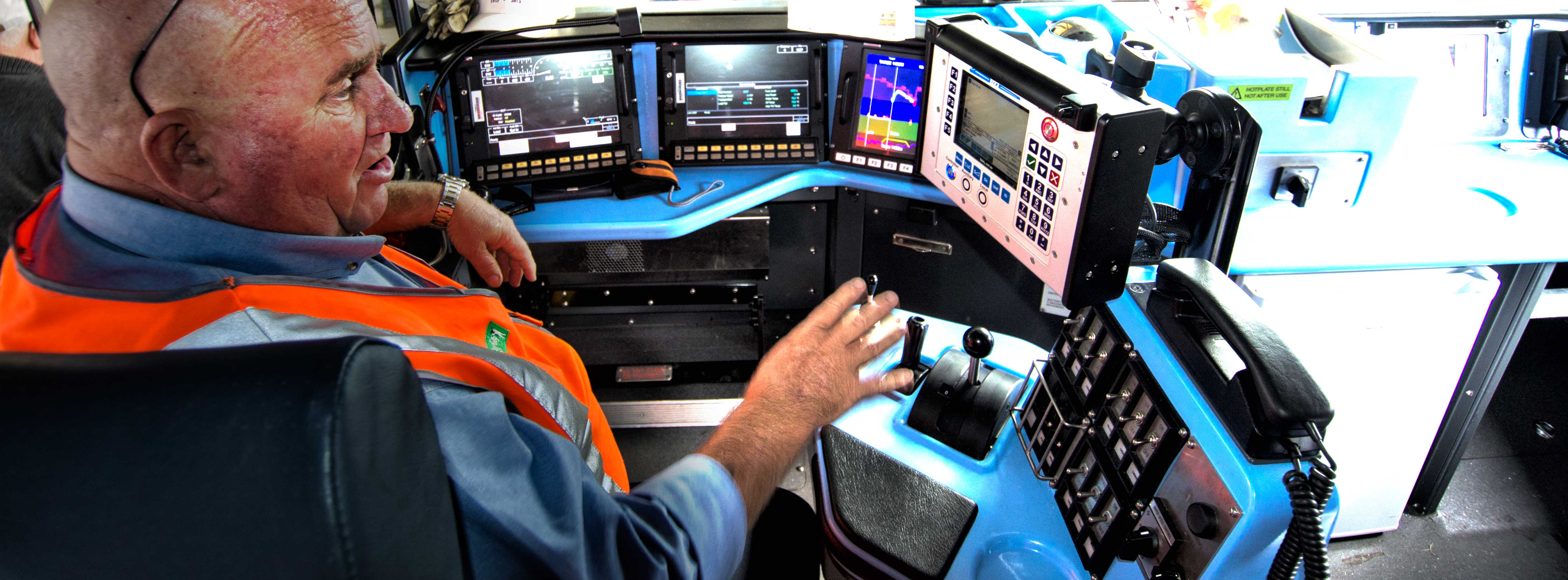
Cab view of Pacific National 9307 in May 2013

=== Pacific National ===
The first of the Pacific National 92 class was officially launched at Port Waratah on 3 October 2008. All 15 entered service on Hunter Valley coal trains and were trialed on Brisbane—Melbourne freights and return. In 2012 Pacific National took delivery of six 93 class C44aci locomotives optimised for intermodal freight transport between Melbourne and Brisbane. On 17 January 2013, Pacific National placed an order for another two (later expanded to five) 93 class locomotives. In 2014, Pacific National extended the order of the 93 class to 9324 in which all 24 93 class are in service. Until late 2023, 9301-24 In late 2023 they were transferred to the Hunter Valley, displacing older 90 Class locomotives. All other examples are run almost exclusively in the Hunter Valley on coal services.

In October 2021 it was announced that UGL had secured a $297 million (later $330 million) order for 50 C44ESACi locomotives from Pacific National, these locomotives are to have GE's newer Evolution series of engine. The locomotives are to be designed and delivered over a period of 7 years, with deliveries starting in 2024. They are to be designated the 94 Class.

The three class leaders 9401, 9402 and 9403, were either complete or awaiting final livery completion at Broadmeadow in July 2024. The 94 class started initial testing in late September with TT class locomotives, eventually commencing in service trials in August 2025 between Melbourne and Adelaide on freight services. The C44ESACi features new technology including GE's newer Evolution series prime mover and a redesigned cab roof.

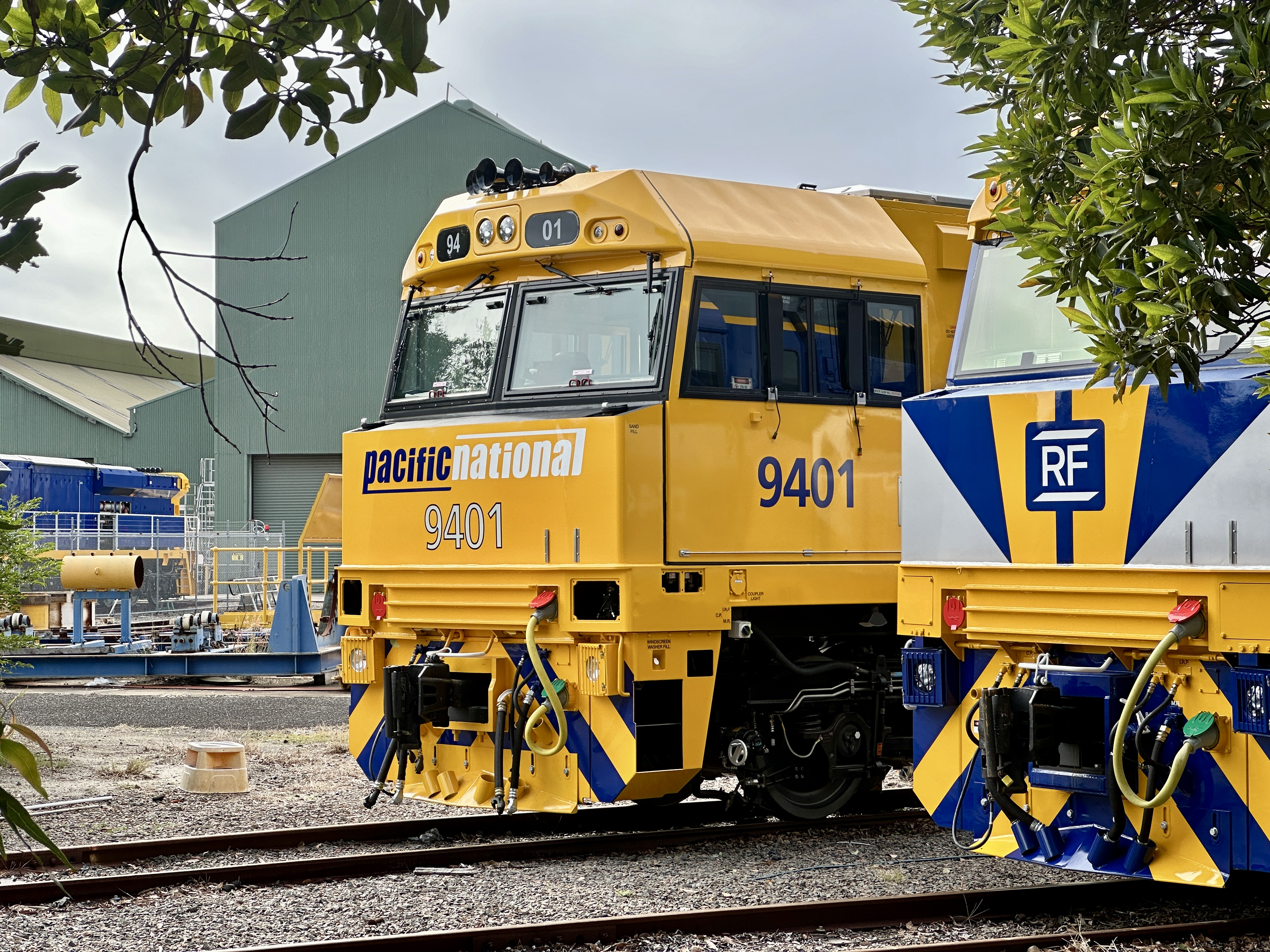
Class leader 9401 sits outside the UGL Broadmeadow facility, in full livery early in July 2024. 9402 and 9403 were nearby awaiting Pacific National logos and class numbering.

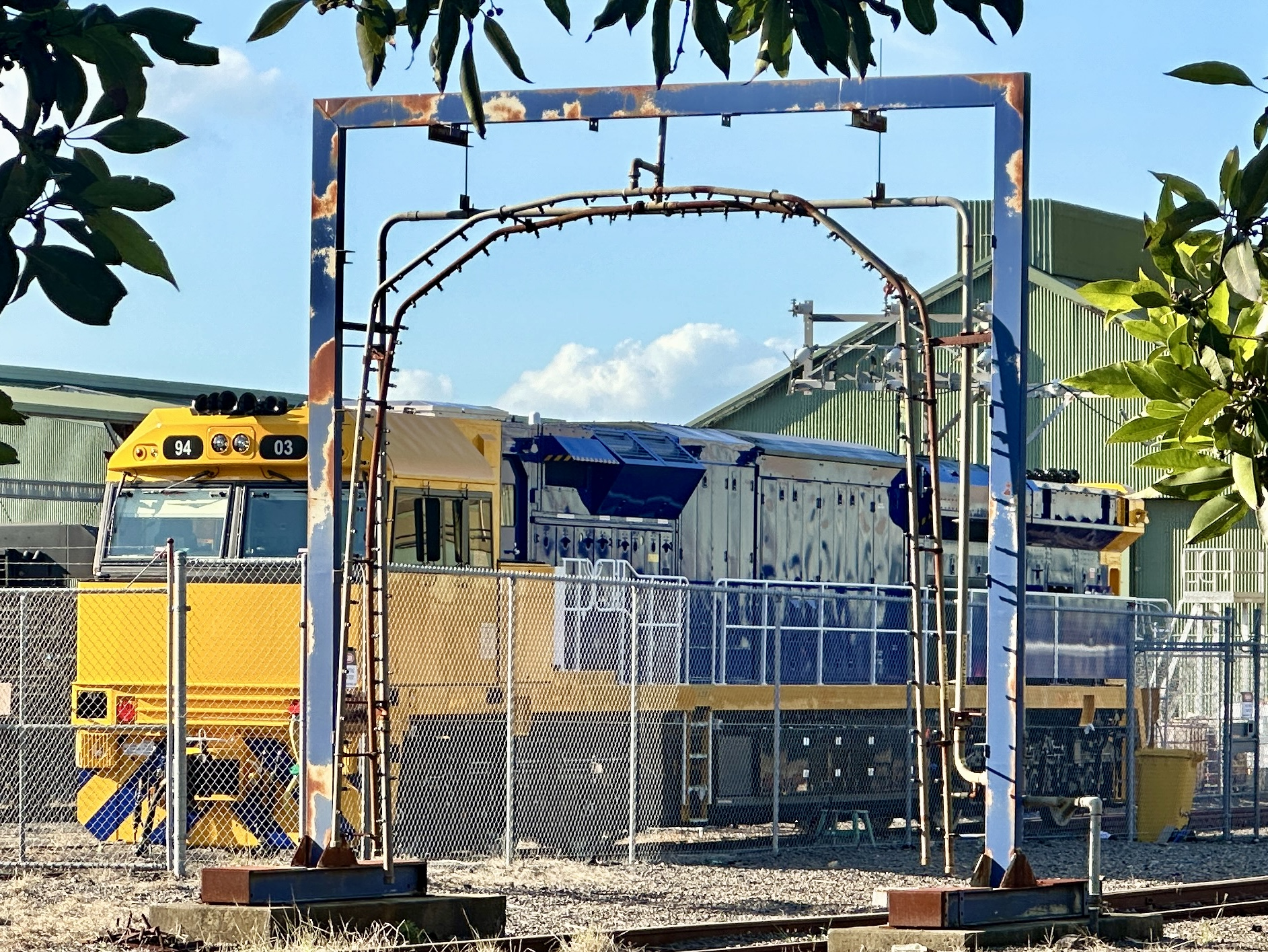
Pacific National new 94 class locomotive 9403 at UGL Broadmeadow in May 2024

=== Aurizon ===
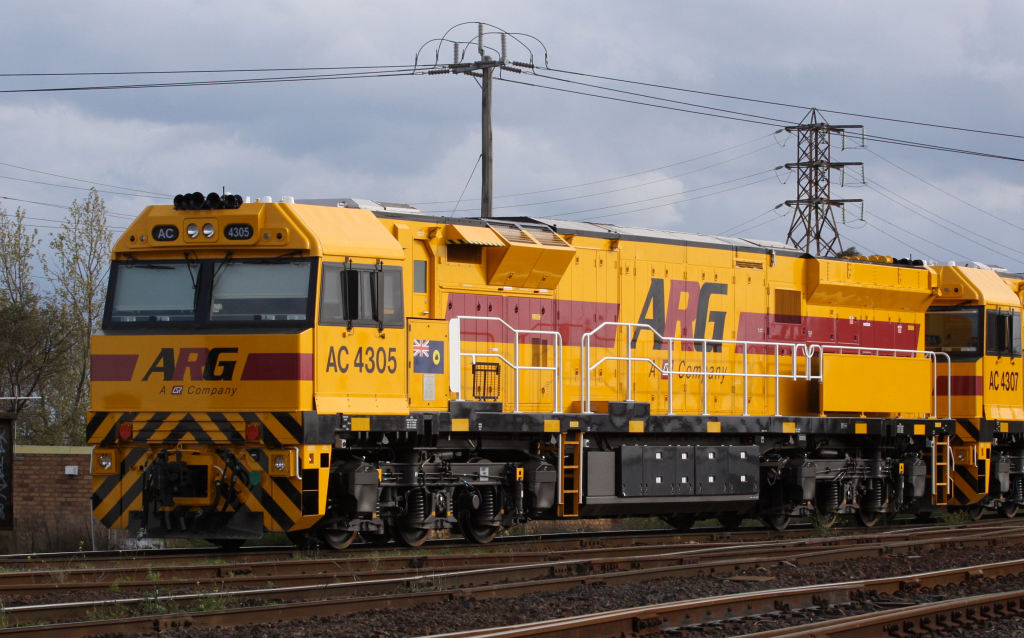
Australian Railroad Group AC4305 at North Dynon in September 2009

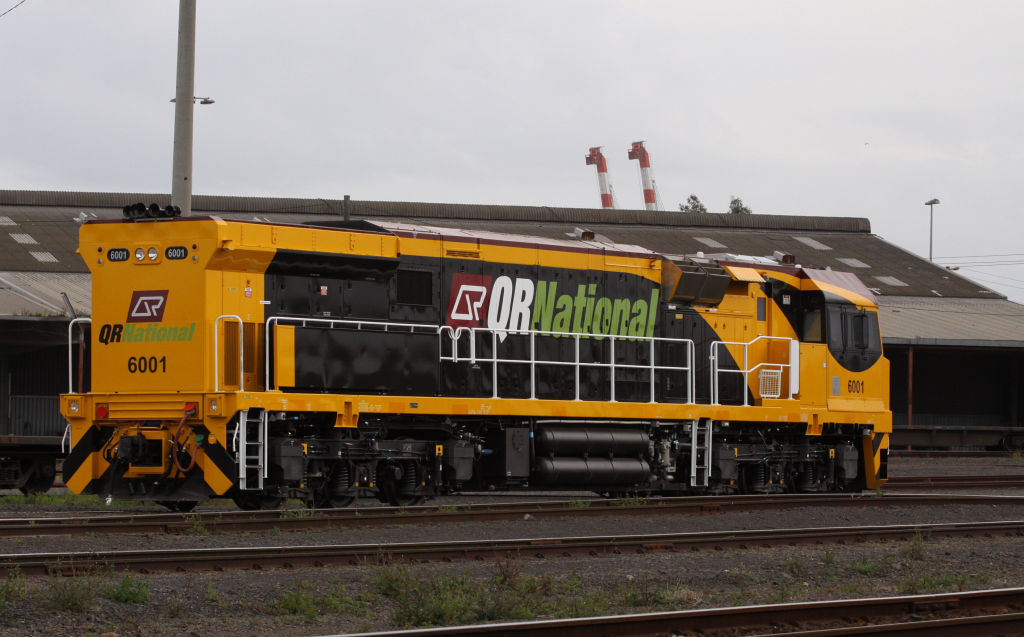
C44Aci QR National Number 6001

In July 2008, QR National subsidiary Australian Railroad Group ordered eight locomotives, with options for 16 more units. Intended for use on their Western Australian standard gauge lines, they were delivered between August and September 2009. These units feature updated electronic control and engine management systems, and had their entry to service delayed by weight issues, with steel body side doors being replaced with lighter aluminium substitutes. Since entering service they have been used on the Koolyanobbing to Esperance iron ore service, in the full fuel load (139 tonnes) configuration.

In January 2009, QR National ordered twelve 6000 class units for use on coal haulage. The first was delivered in October 2009. These units were to be fitted with electronically controlled pneumatic braking equipment, for operation with Hunter Valley coal wagons.

QR National subsequently ordered an additional 12 locomotives to operate intermodal trains. The first nine were delivered in 2012 as the 6020 class with the final three diverted to Australian Railroad Group as the ACC class.

Aurizon purchased five new 6040 class units were built in 2017–18.

Aurizon ordered 10 new C44aci locomotives in 2021, numbered ACD 6046–6055. 6046 entered service on 19 March 2022, 6047 on 24 March 6048 on 23 April 6049 on 24 April. ACD 6050 entered service on 10 October 2022, and 6051 entered service on 12 October 2022. ACD 6052 entered service on 19 December 2022, ACD 6053 entered service on 29 December 2022, 6054 on the 27th, and ACD 6055 entered service on 13 February 2023. 6055's livery features Australian Aboriginal artwork on the long end.

In 2021, ORA took delivery of GWU012-GWU015, these are now owned by Aurizon.

In mid 2024, Aurizon saw two new ACD class locomotives enter service, ACD6056 and ACD6057. ACD6058 and ACD6059 are soon to follow, with ACD6060-ACD6075 later. They have been used on Aurizon's intermodal services between Perth and Melbourne, Melbourne and Brisbane and Sydney and Perth. All are expected in service during 2025. The order was later reduced by nine class members.

=== East Coast Rail ===
East Coast Rail comprises the former One Rail Australia's east coast coal operations in Queensland and NSW. In 2012 and in 2020, Genesee & Wyoming Australia took delivery of 11 locomotives for use on Hunter Valley Coal trains services, numbered GWU001-GWU011. They eventually found themselves back in NSW. All 30 of the former Glencore and One Rail Australia XRN class are now owned by East Coast Rail as well, though still wearing the GWA/ORA livery. All are used on Hunter Valley coal trains.

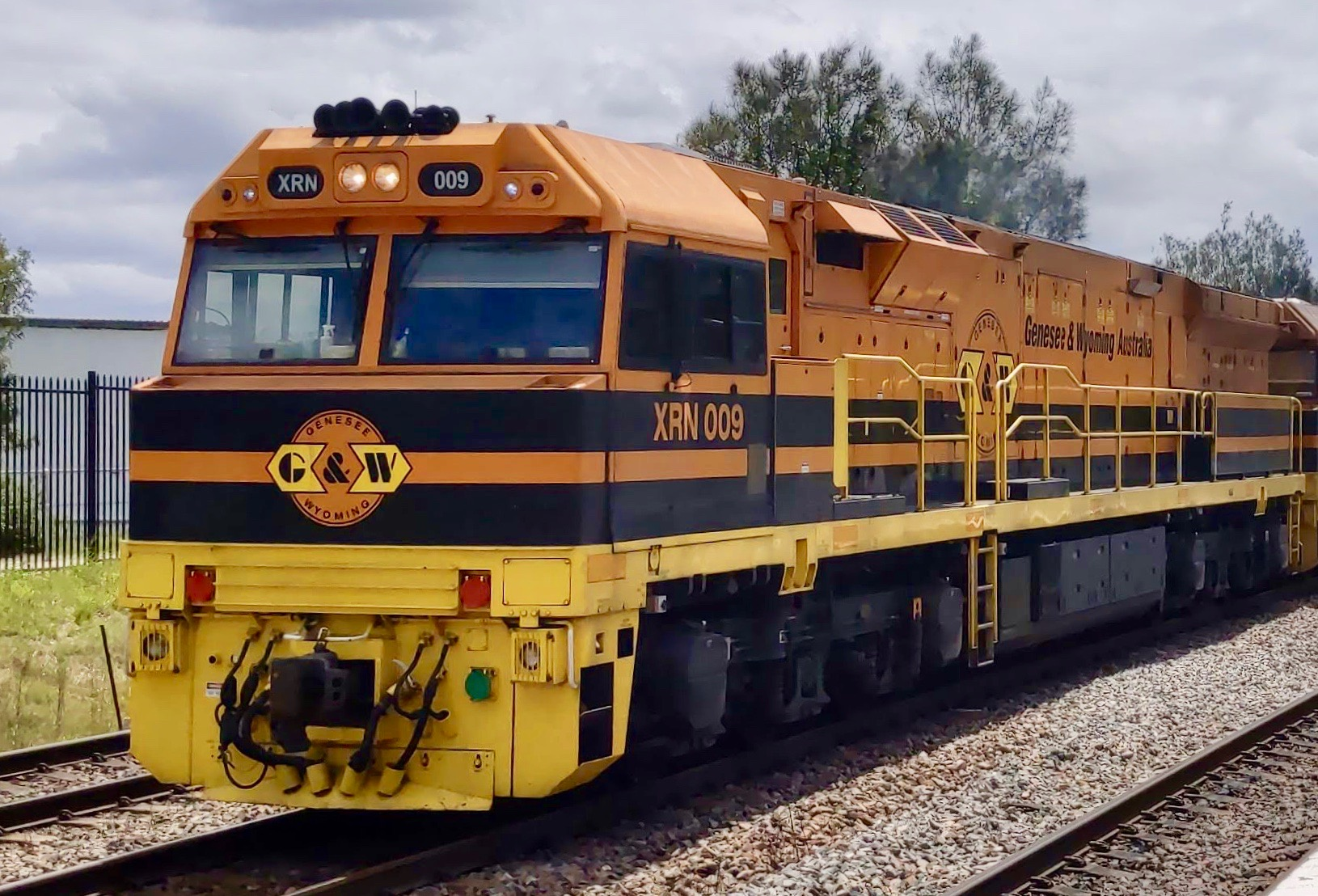
One Rail Australia XRN Class C44ACI

=== RailFirst Asset Management ===
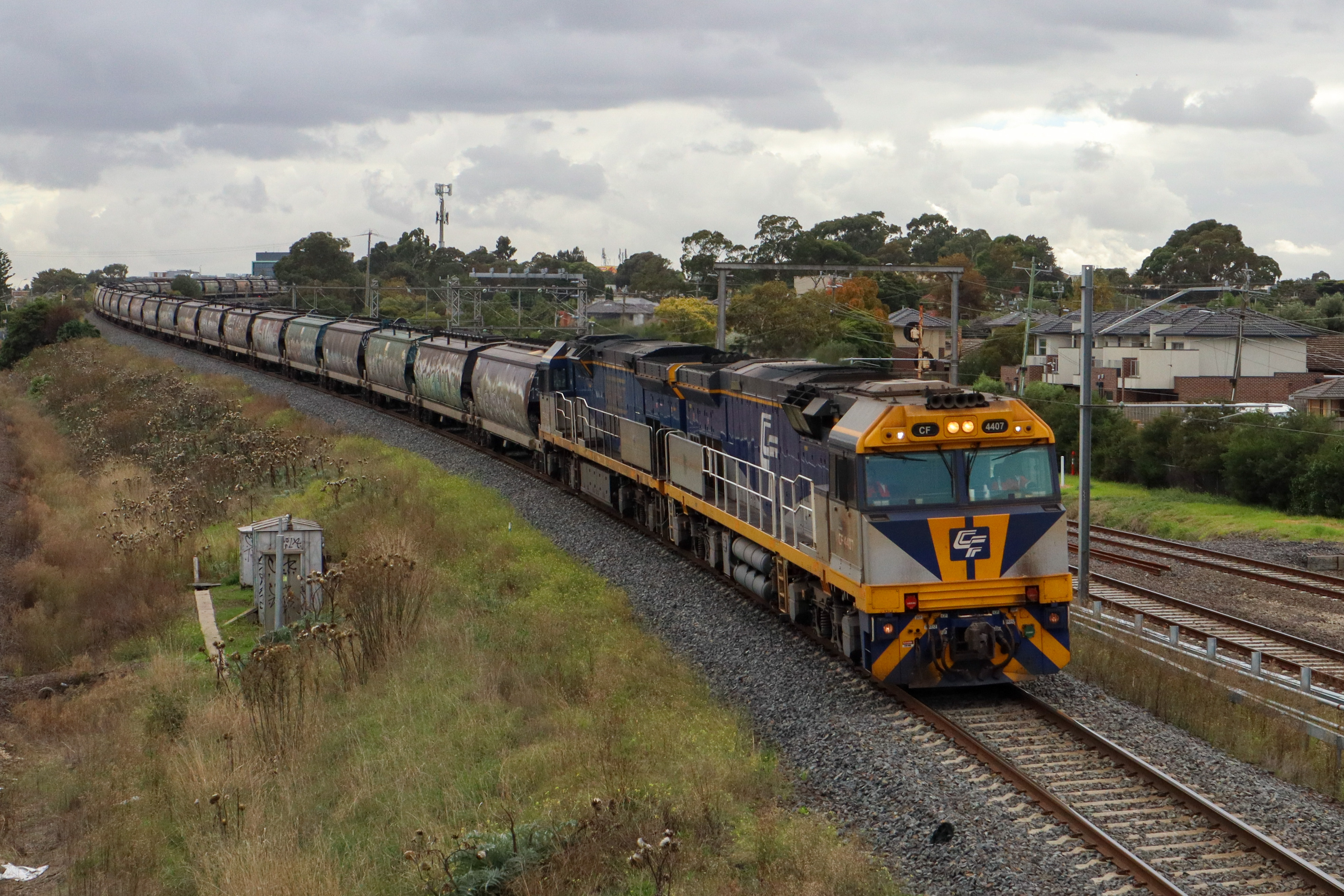
RFAM CF Class C44ACi

In 2012–13, RFAM took delivery of 12 C44aci locomotives as the CF class, numbered CF4401-CF4412. CF4412 was named Black Caviar and painted in salmon pink, silver and black (which were the racing colours of Black Caviar), as opposed to the standard blue, silver and yellow that CFCLA usually used. 10 locomotives were included in the transfer of assets to Anchorage Capital Partners in January 2020, and subsequent rebranding as Rail First Asset Management in early 2021. Four more were ordered in 2021, and a further four in 2023.

=== Centennial Coal ===
In 2012, Centennial Coal took delivery of seven locomotives for their coal operations. These are operated by Southern Shorthaul Railroad.

=== Mineral Resources ===
UGL Rail had four units on the production line for Consolidated Rail Leasing as the CRL class before the order was cancelled. They were completed and retained by UGL as lease units. They along with two units completed for but not delivered to Genesee & Wyoming Australia were sold to Mineral Resources as the MRL class. The first entered service in June 2014 hauling iron ore train from Mount Walton to Kwinana.

Following Mineral Resources services being taken over by Aurizon with its own locomotives, the six MRL units were sold to Southern Shorthaul Railroad in 2025.

=== Fletcher International Exports ===
In 2014, three were completed for Fletcher International Exports in attractive red and blue livery to haul the Fletcher's container service from Dubbo to Port Botany. Trains are run by Southern Shorthaul Railroad. A fourth unit (FIE004) was ordered in 2021. In November 2022, it was undergoing outdoor commissioning at UGL Broadmeadow with ACD6052, entering service on 16 November 2022.

=== Crawfords Freightlines ===
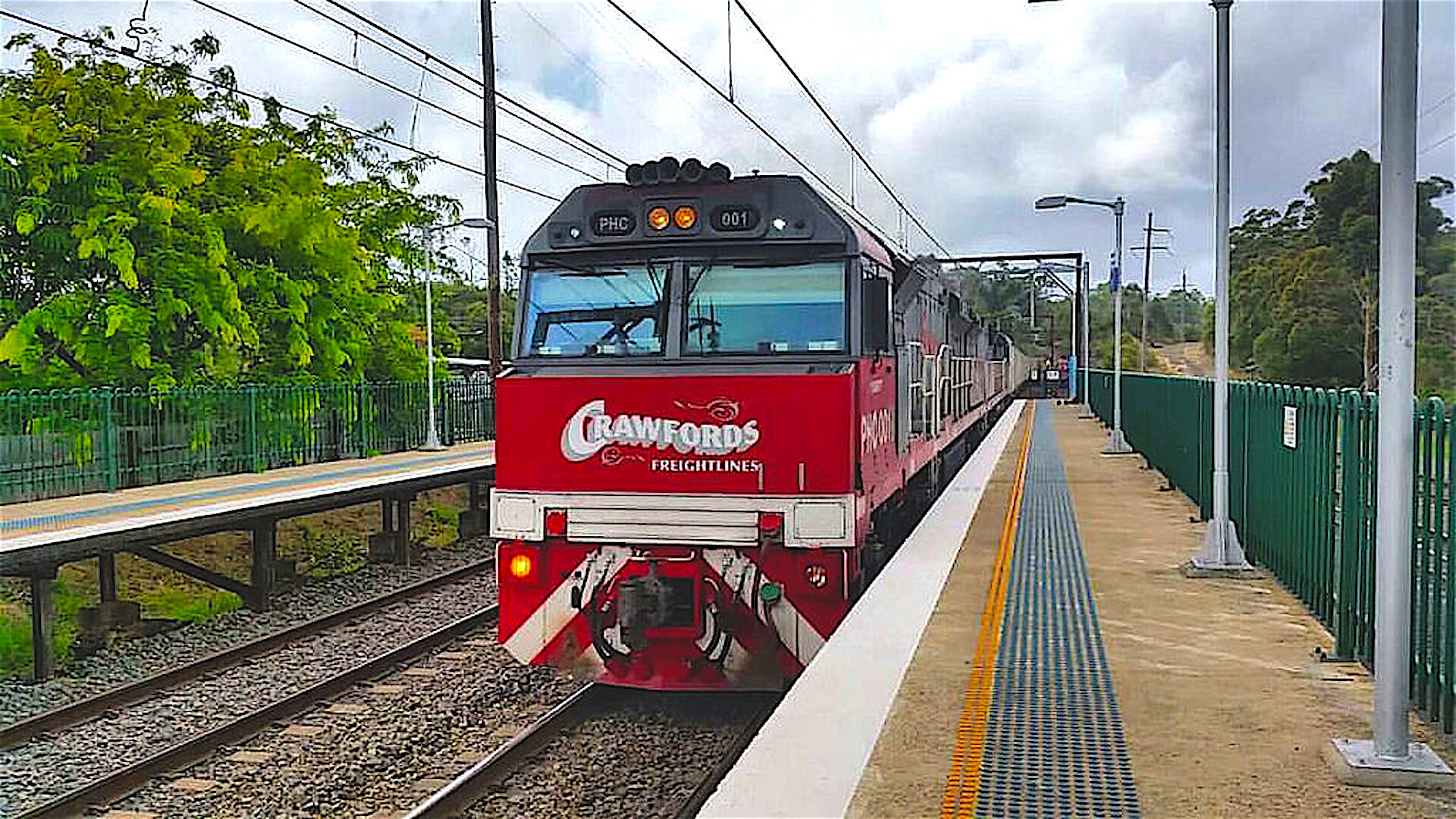
PHC001 at Cowan in 2016

Two locomotives (known as Spud and Carrot) have become the permanent motive power for the Sandgate to Port Botany container train operated by Crawfords Freightlines, replacing the leased C class locomotives as the motive power.

=== Qube Holdings ===
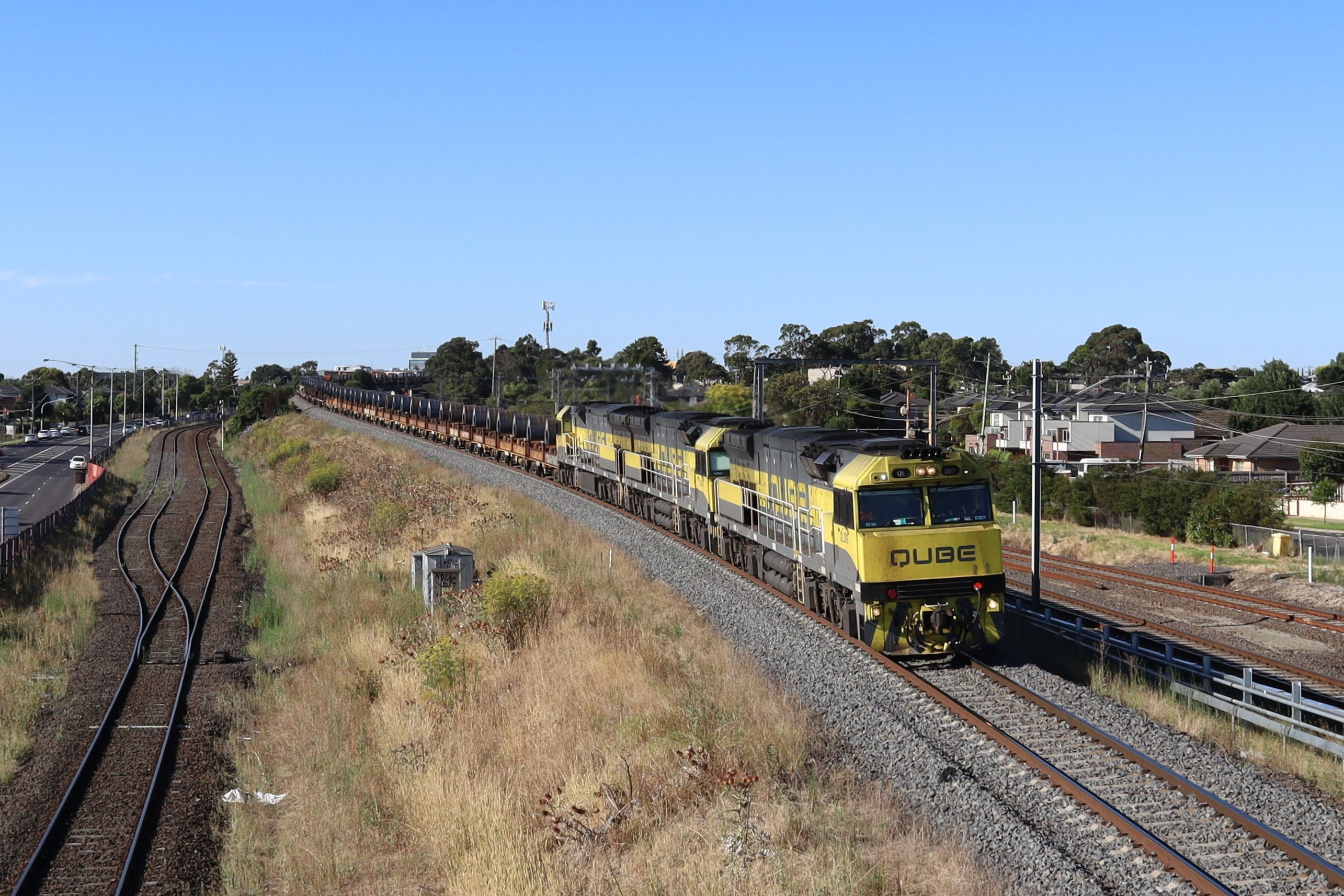
QL009 at Jacana in 2022

Qube announced the purchase of an unspecified number of locomotives in March 2020, for delivery over 18 months. It was later confirmed that 12 locomotives were to be built as QL class. As of 9 November 2021, all 12 locomotives are in service. After initially seeing use on QUBE's various trains throughout NSW they now mainly see use on the BlueScope Steel services out of Port Kembla to Melbourne (North Dynon then to Long Island on broad gauge) and Brisbane, now that QUBE have taken this contract over from Pacific National from 1 January 2022. In June 2022 QUBE ordered 8 more locomotives. QL013 entered service on 14 May 2023 and QL014 entered service on 24 May 2023. QL015 entered service on 6 June 2023, QL016 on 27 June 2023, QL017 entered service on 30 June 2023 and QL018 entered service on 15 July 2023. QL019 entered service on 15 August 2023. QL019 and QL020 wear a predominantly blue Aboriginal design with a map of Australia.

== Fleet ==
Owner	Operator	Class	Number in class	Road numbers	Built	Notes
Pacific National		92	15	9201–9215	2008–09	Allocated to Hunter Valley coal services.
Pacific National		93	24	9301–9324	2012–13 (9301–9317), 2016–17 (9318–20), 2020 (9321–24).	Allocated to Hunter Valley coal services.
Pacific National		94	50	9401–9450	2024–29	Part of fleet rejuvenation in intermodal/interstate operations, plus future Inland Rail. Will have the Evolution series engine. 'C44ESACi'
Aurizon		6000	12	6001-6012	2009	
Aurizon		6020	9	6021–6029	2012	
Aurizon		6040	5	6041-6045	2017–2018	
Aurizon		CF	2	CF4401 & CF4409	2011-13	Purchased from Rail First Asset Management
Aurizon		AC	8	AC4301–AC4308	2009	
Aurizon		ACB	6	ACB4401–ACB4406	2011	
Aurizon		ACC	3	ACC6030–ACC6032	2012	
Aurizon		ACD	30	ACD6046–ACD6075	2022-2025	
Aurizon		GWU	4	GWU012–GWU015	2021	
East Coast Rail		GWU	11	GWU001-GWU011	2012-2020	Used on Hunter Valley coal operations.
East Coast Rail		XRN	30	XRN001-XRN030	2010-2012	Used on Hunter Valley coal operations.
Rail First Asset Management	lease units	CF	37	CF4402-CF4408, CF4410-CF4439	2011-Present	Leased to operators as required. They have seen service with Pacific National, Aurizon, SCT Logistics, Qube Holdings, Southern Shorthaul Railroad and Sydney Rail Services have also operated these locos on behalf of Crawfords Freightlines. CF4412 is named Black Caviar and is painted in the famous horses salmon and black dots racing colours. 12 more have been ordered to replace the EL class locomotives in mid-2026.
Centennial Coal	Southern Shorthaul Railroad	CEY	7	CEY001–CEY007	2011-2012	Painted in the SSR livery, but with green replacing black for the stripe. Used on coal trains from the Blue Mountains to Newcastle, and on occasion to the Illawarra.
Fletcher International Exports	Southern Shorthaul Railroad	FIE	4	FIE001–FIE004	2014-2022	Used between Dubbo and Port Botany, and an infrequent shuttle from Dubbo to Hermidale.
Southern Shorthaul Railroad		MRL	6	MRL001–MRL006	2013-2014	Four originally ordered by Consolidated Rail Leasing, then purchased by Mineral Resources with two additional locos newly built for use in Western Australia hauling iron ore trains. Purchased by Southern Shorthaul Railroad in 2025.
Crawford's Freightlines	Sydney Rail Services	PHC	2	PHC001–PHC002	2016	PHC001 named Carrot and PHC002 named Spud. In operated by Sydney Rail Services
Qube Holdings		QL	20	QL001–QL020	2021-2023	20 in service. Fitted with steering bogies.

== Related development ==
- National Rail NR class, ancestor model Cv40-9i
- QR National 5000 class, ancestor model C40aci
- QR National 5020 class, heavy haul variant model C44acHi
- Downer EDI Rail GT46C ACe, principal competitor
