= HVCC =

HVCC may refer to:

- Hudson Valley Community College, college in New York, USA
- Home valuation code of conduct, American document
- Hunter Valley Coal Chain, Australian mining chain
