= 5000 class =

5000 class may refer to:

- PNR 5000 class, diesel-electric locomotives
- QR National 5000 class, diesel-electric locomotives
