= Class 90 =

Class 90 may refer to:

- British Rail Class 90
- German Class 90 tank locomotives with a 0-6-2T wheel arrangement operated by the Deutsche Reichsbahn and its successor administrations, comprising:
  - Class 90.0-2: Prussian T 9, LBE T 9, PKP Class TKi1
  - Class 90.3: ČSD Class 312.7
  - Class 90.10: BBÖ 30 (2-6-2T)
  - Class 90.11: JDŽ Class 51 (2-6-2T)
  - Class 90.64: various locomotives taken over in 1949 by the Deutsche Reichsbahn (GDR)
  - Class 90.70: EWA IIIb
- New South Wales 90 class locomotive, diesel-electric locomotives
