= New South Wales 90 class locomotive =

Heavy Australia diesel locomotive

New South Wales 90 class
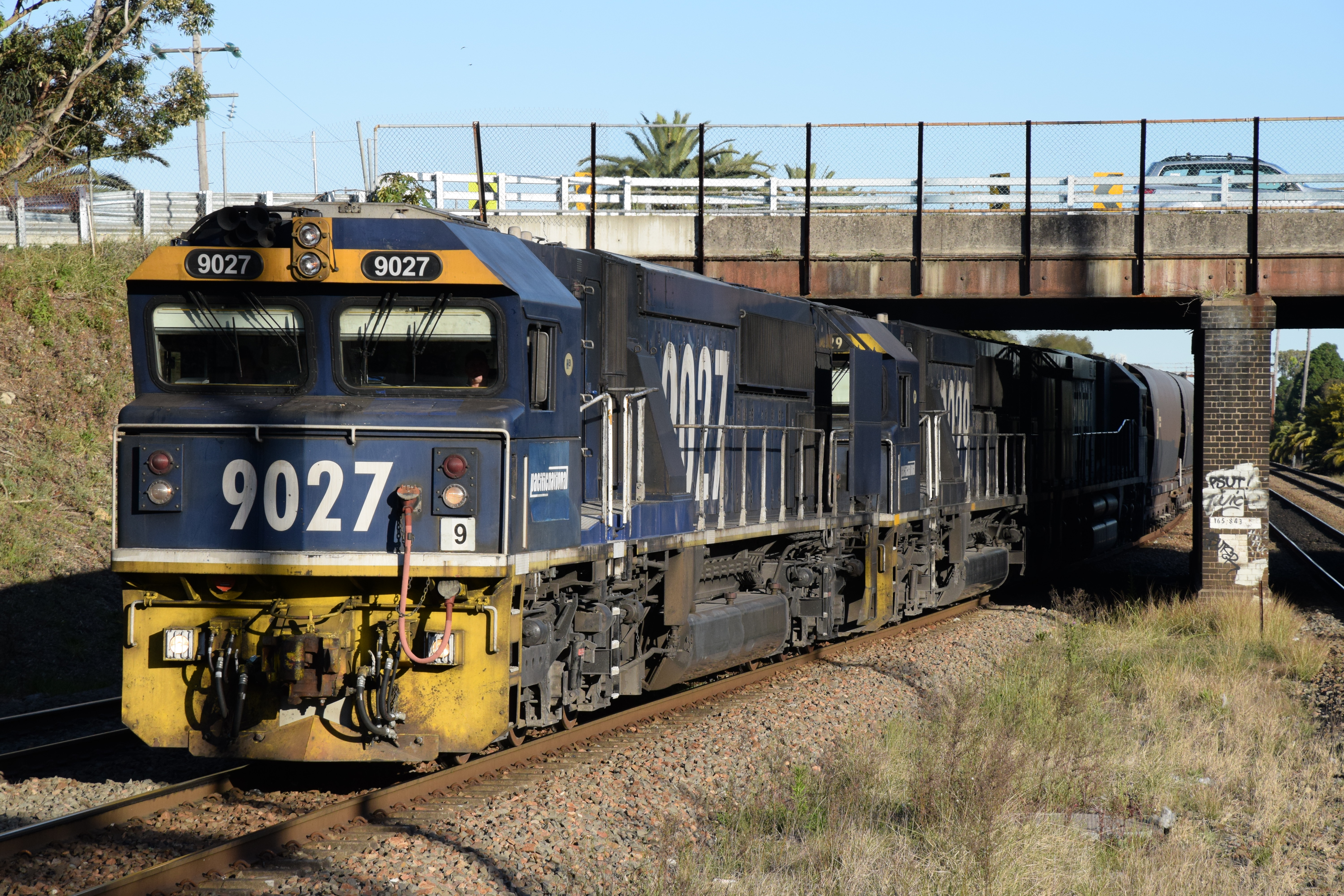
- Pacific National 9027 at Waratah in September 2018
Type and origin
- Power type: Diesel-electric
- Builder: Electro-Motive Division, London, Ontario (9001–9031); EDi Rail, Cardiff, NSW (9032–9035)
- Model: EMD GT46CWM
- Build date: 1994-2005
- Total produced: 35
Specifications
- Configuration
  - UIC: Co'Co'
- Gauge: 1,435 mm (4 ft 8 1/2 in) standard gauge
- Length: 22 m (72 ft 2 1/8 in)
- Loco weight: Original: 165 t (162 long tons; 182 short tons); Modified: 177 t (174 long tons; 195 short tons)
- Fuel type: Diesel
- Prime mover: EMD 16-710G3A
- Engine type: V16
- Aspiration: Turbochargers
- Alternator: EMD AR11
- Traction motors: EMD D87ETR
- Cylinders: 16
- Transmission: Electric
- MU working: Equipped
- Loco brake: Air and Dynamic braking
- Train brakes: Air
- Safety systems: Nathan P5 air horn, vigilance
Performance figures
- Maximum speed: 115 km/h (71 mph)
- Power output: 4,060 hp (3,030 kW)
Career
- Operators: Pacific National
- Number in class: 35
- Numbers: 9001–9035
- Delivered: 1994
- First run: May 1994
- Last run: 30th August 2026
- Current owner: Pacific National
- Disposition: 17 stored, 18 scrapped

The 90 class locomotives were a class of heavy haul diesel-electric locomotives built 1994 to 2005 by Electro-Motive Division, Canada & EDi Rail, Cardiff for Pacific National for use on high tonnage Hunter Valley coal workings.

== History ==
Ordered in July 1992 under the Clyde Ready Power contract along with the 82 class, the first batch of 31 locomotives was built by Electro-Motive Division in London, Ontario, Canada in 1994. The second batch of four locomotives was delivered in November 2005, assembled by EDi Rail at Cardiff Workshops to the same specification from components imported from Canada and frames built in Port Augusta, South Australia.

The 90 class were designed specifically for heavy coal haulage in the Lower Hunter Valley region of New South Wales, to meet the required specifications the class was designed with much heavier frames than typical for locomotives then in use specifically to increase their tractive effort. This made them the heaviest locomotives in use in Australia outside the Pilbara region until delivery of the QR National 5020 class in 2010. This has restricted the class to the Hunter Valley coal network for their entire career with minimal exception.

The locomotives were designed with many component commonalities with the 82 Class for ease of maintenance at the Clyde Engineering Kooragang Island servicing facility, a purpose built maintenance depot for the 90 and 82 class locomotives constructed as part of the Clyde ReadyPower contract, opening in June 1994.

A number of the class were named after Australian Olympic Games athletes.

All passed to Pacific National when FreightCorp was privatised in February 2002.

The majority of the Canadian built locomotives retain their FreightCorp livery with Pacific National decals, while the later EDi batch were all delivered in Pacific National livery. Slowly, Canadian built locomotives are being repainted into the Pacific National Livery, with 9012 being the first repainted in November 2018.

Units 9032, 9033 and 9034 were modified by EDi Rail in May 2017 to increase their mass to 177 tonnes, bringing their tractive effort on par with more modern AC units. Later all units 9024 through 9035 were modified increasing mass to 177 tonnes.

Many of the design features of the class were incorporated into the Downer EDI Rail GT46C.

== Operations ==
Usually restricted to Hunter Valley coal trains, the 90 class operate these services from various Newcastle coal export terminals and the Eraring Power Station as far a field as Muswellbrook and Ulan, usually double or triple heading trains of up to 96 coal wagons. Until recently this was the only revenue work the locomotives had performed, this changing in 2020 with Pacific National now allocating three locomotives at a time for banking duties over the Liverpool Ranges at Ardglen. This being achieved after gradual axle-loading upgrades of the Main North Line past Muswellbrook to support the boom of coal output from the Gunnedah Basin, and an upgrade of Progress Rail's yard infrastructure in Werris Creek, where the locomotives are serviced whilst allocated to banking. Members of the class have also visited the wheel lathe at Delec Locomotive Depot in Sydney and one was on display at Sydney Central for the 100th anniversary of Clyde Engineering in 1998. To minimise weight, they operated as light engine and with only a small amount of fuel.

== Future ==
With ARTC's intention for all Hunter Valley coal trains to operate using Electronically controlled pneumatic brakes (ECP) in the near future, the 90 class lack this capability. Along with the continued obsolescence of the class's DC traction package when compared to more modern AC locomotives the class are approaching the final years of their niche in heavy coal haulage outside of undergoing a major rebuild. What will happen is unclear as Pacific National have made conflicting statements and actions regarding whether the locomotives will be rebuilt or withdrawn from service in the near future, with members of the class coming in and out of storage, although none at this time have been scrapped. Their heavy weight still restricts their field of operation greatly, so once retired from coal work the locomotives will struggle to fit other work outside the before-mentioned banking duties.

As of 1 August 2025, Southern Shorthaul Railroad are set to take over Pacific National's Boral aggregate contract. This means that the TT classes assigned to these duties are likely to move to the Hunter Valley. Additionally, Pacific National have recently acquired Qube Holdings locomotives QE007 - QE012 (Re-numbered TT201-TT206). The use of these extra units are currently unknown (as of 1 August 2025). With all of these factors, it is likely that the 90 class will not be around for much longer.

== Demise ==
As of the 31st of August 2026, the 90 class no longer operate, their tenure concluding with 9015 running light engine to Kooragang in the early hours of the morning. 18 of the 35 built have been scrapped at Werris Creek Locomotive Depot with the rest to follow in the near future. The 90 class were replaced by multiple types of locomotive, including but not limited to the TT200 class, ex Boral TT classes and the 94 classes. With the main reasons being Australian Rail Track Corporation wanting all Hunter coal trains to operate with ECP, their heavy weight, loss of contracts as well as colliery closures and their obsolete DC traction. It is unlikely any of the remaining 17 will be preserved as they have been claimed to have a lack of significance, thus marking the end of 32 years of service from the 90 class.

== Status table ==
Key:	In service	Stored or withdrawn	Preserved	Under Overhaul	Converted	Scrapped

Locomotive	Name	Serial No	Entered service	Operator	Livery	Status
9001	Ernest Henry	1373/918266-3	May 1994	Pacific National	FreightCorp blue	Scrapped - Werris Creek
9002	Michael Wenden	1374/918266-2	May 1994	Pacific National	FreightCorp blue	Scrapped - Werris Creek
9003	Matthew Ryan	1375/918266-1	Aug 1994	Pacific National	FreightCorp blue	Scrapped - Werris Creek
9004	Kevin Nichols	1376/918266-4	May 1994	Pacific National	FreightCorp blue	Scrapped - Werris Creek
9005	Kevin Barry	1377/918266-5	May 1994	Pacific National	FreightCorp blue	Scrapped - Werris Creek
9006	Murray Rose	1378/918266-6	May 1994	Pacific National	FreightCorp blue	Scrapped - Werris Creek
9007	Dunc Gray	1379/918266-7	May 1994	Pacific National	FreightCorp blue	Scrapped - Werris Creek
9008	Ralph Doubell	1380/918266-8	Aug 1994	Pacific National	FreightCorp blue	Stored - Werris Creek 2026
9009	Lionel Cox	1381/918266-9	Jul 1994	Pacific National	FreightCorp blue	Scrapped - Werris Creek
9010	John Devitt	1382/918266-10	Jul 1994	Pacific National	FreightCorp blue	Scrapped - Werris Creek
9011	Kevan Gosper	1383/918266-11	Jul 1994	Pacific National	FreightCorp blue	Scrapped - Werris Creek
9012	Neil Brooks/Peter Evans/ Mark Kerry/Mark Tonelli	1384/918266-12	Jun 1994	Pacific National	Pacific National blue & yellow	Scrapped - Werris Creek
9013	Michael Diamond	1385/918266-13	Jun 1994	Pacific National	FreightCorp blue	Scrapped - Werris Creek
9014	Peter Antonie/Stephen Hawkins	1386/918266-14	Jul 1994	Pacific National	FreightCorp blue	Scrapped - Werris Creek
9015	Duncan Armstrong	1387/918266-15	Jul 1994	Pacific National	FreightCorp blue	Stored - Werris Creek 2026
9016	Herb Elliott	1388/918266-16	Jul 1994	Pacific National	FreightCorp blue	Scrapped - Werris Creek
9017	Andrew Cooper/Nicholas Green/ Mike McKay/James Tomkins	1389/918266-17	Jun 1994	Pacific National	FreightCorp blue	Scrapped - Werris Creek
9018	John Konrads	1390/918266-18	Jul 1994	Pacific National	FreightCorp blue	Scrapped - Werris Creek
9019	Dean Lukin	1391/918266-19	Jul 1994	Pacific National	FreightCorp blue	Stored - Werris Creek 2026
9020	Russell Mark	1392/918266-20	Jun 1994	Pacific National	FreightCorp blue	Stored - Werris Creek 2026
9021	Ian O'Brien	1393/918266-21	Aug 1994	Pacific National	FreightCorp blue	Stored - Cardiff 2021
9022	Clint Robinson	1394/918266-22	Aug 1994	Pacific National	FreightCorp blue	Scrapped - Werris Creek
9023	Robert Windle	1395/918266-23	Oct 1994	Pacific National	FreightCorp blue	Scrapped - Werris Creek
9024	John Winter	1396/918266-24	Aug 1994	Pacific National	FreightCorp Blue	Stored - Werris Creek 2026
9025	Tony O'Brien	1397/918266-25	Aug 1994	Pacific National	FreightCorp blue	Stored - Werris Creek 2026
9026	David Theile	1398/918266-26	Oct 1994	Pacific National	FreightCorp blue	Stored - Werris Creek 2026
9027	–	1399/918266-27	Aug 1994	Pacific National	FreightCorp blue	Stored - Werris Creek 2026
9028	–	1400/918266/28	Aug 1994	Pacific National	FreightCorp blue	Stored - Werris Creek 2026
9029	–	1401/918266/29	Aug 1994	Pacific National	FreightCorp blue	Stored - Werris Creek 2026
9030	Australian Men's Hockey Team	1402/918266-30	Aug 1994	Pacific National	FreightCorp blue	Stored - Werris Creek 2026
9031	Len Howell	1403/918266/31	Aug 1994	Pacific National	Pacific National blue & yellow	Stored - Werris Creek 2026
9032	–	05–1692	Nov 2005	Pacific National	Pacific National blue & yellow	Stored - Werris Creek 2026
9033	–	05–1693	Nov 2005	Pacific National	Pacific National blue & yellow	Stored - Werris Creek 2026
9034	–	05–1694	Nov 2005	Pacific National	Pacific National blue & yellow	Stored - Werris Creek 2026
9035	–	05–1695	Nov 2005	Pacific National	Pacific National blue & yellow	Stored - Werris Creek 2026

== Related development ==
- Downer EDI Rail GT46C
