= Crawfords Freightlines =

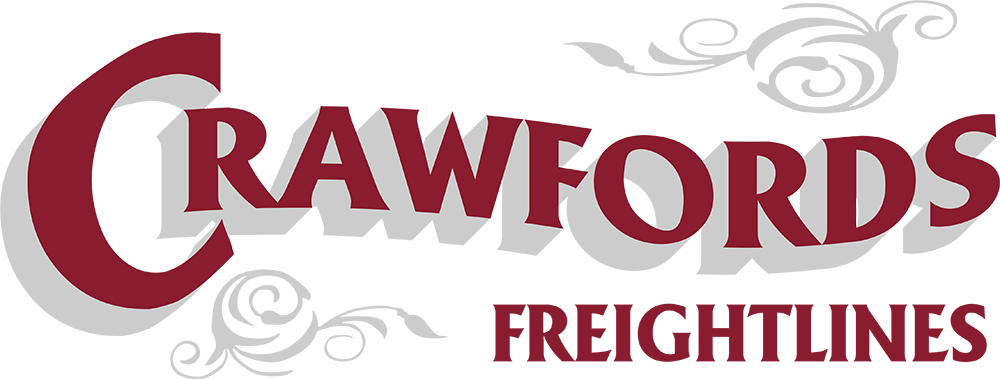

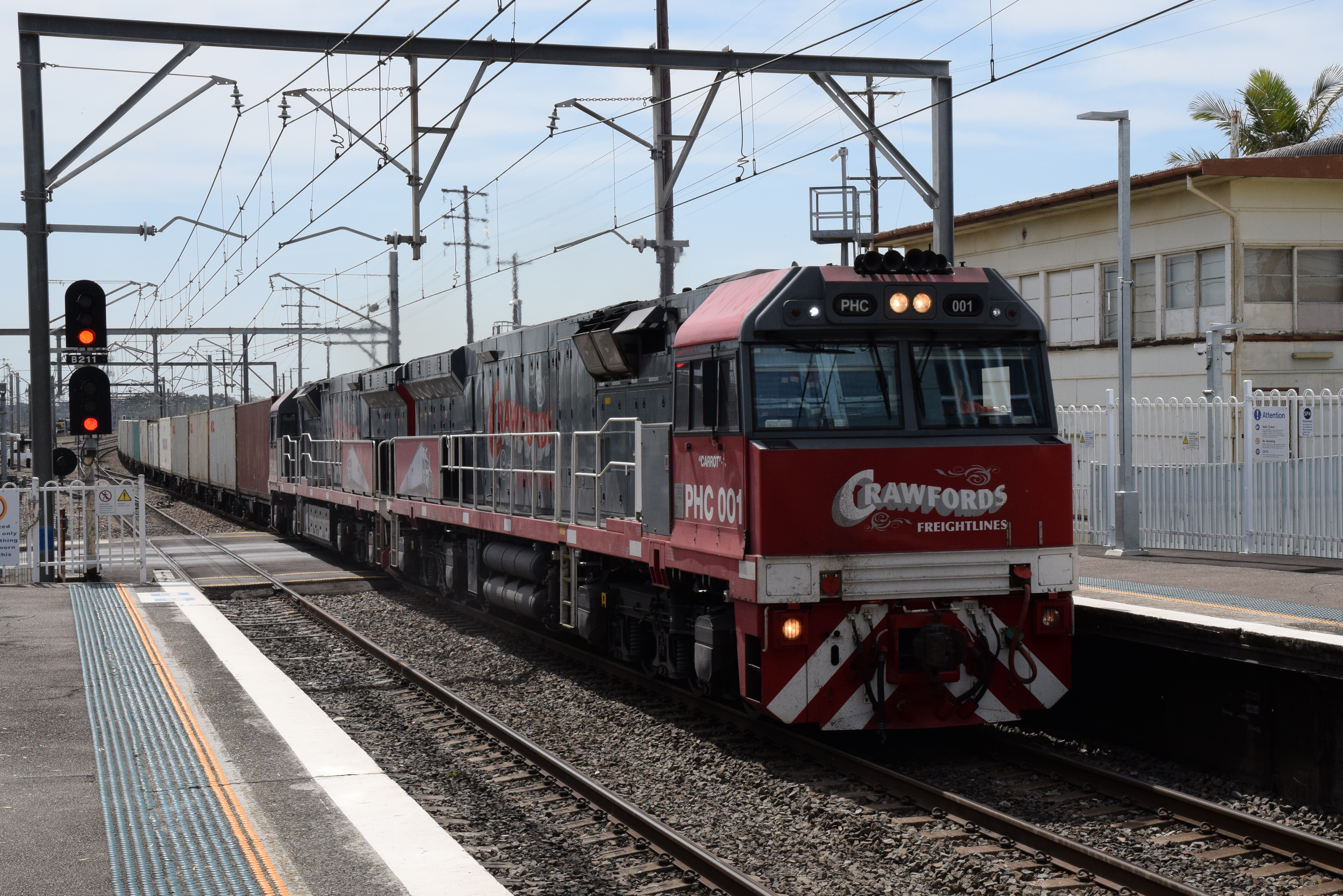
- UGL Rail C44aci locomotives hauling a Port Botany bound intermodal fright train.
- Industry: Freight transport
- Founder: Peter Crawford
- Headquarters: Sandgate, New South Wales
- Number of locations: 4 Sites
- Owner: Peter Crawford
- Number of employees: 260
- Website: crawfordsfreightlines.com.au

Crawfords Freightlines is a freight transportation company based in Sandgate, New South Wales.

== Road services ==
Crawfords Freightlines operates 100 trucks out of Singleton, Werris Creek and Sandgate New South Wales, and Gracemere Queensland.

== Rail Services ==
Crawfords Freightlines operates a daily freight train from Sandgate to Port Botany carrying intermodal containers. All crew and logistics services are provided by Sydney Rail Services. The service commenced in 2012 using the accreditation of El Zorro and then Espee Railroad Services. Sydney Rail Services gained its own accreditation in November 2013.

Initially the service was hauled by C class locomotives leased from Greentrains. These were replaced on 6 March 2016 by two UGL Rail C44acis purchased by Crawfords.

In January 2017 Crawfords operated a couple of trial services out of Goulburn, transporting containerised logs, and in late May/June of that year, they were successful in acquiring that work along with Scrap Metal out of the ACT permanently. On 28 June 2018 Crawfords was awarded the contract by Heron Resources Limited to provide road and rail transportation services for its Woodlawn Zinc-Cooper Project near Goulburn in New South Wales.

In June 2019, Crawfords commenced operations at its newly developed, Werris Creek Intermodal Rail Terminal. This service has quickly grown, from 3x900m services, to 3x1280m services, to Port Botany per week. With their Sandgate service sometimes operating an additional 800m service every couple of weeks. As of October 2019, they had also commenced operating a shuttle service between Werris Creek and Narrabri for some newly acquired export clients in the North West.
