= QR National 5000 class =

Class of Australian diesel-electric locomotives

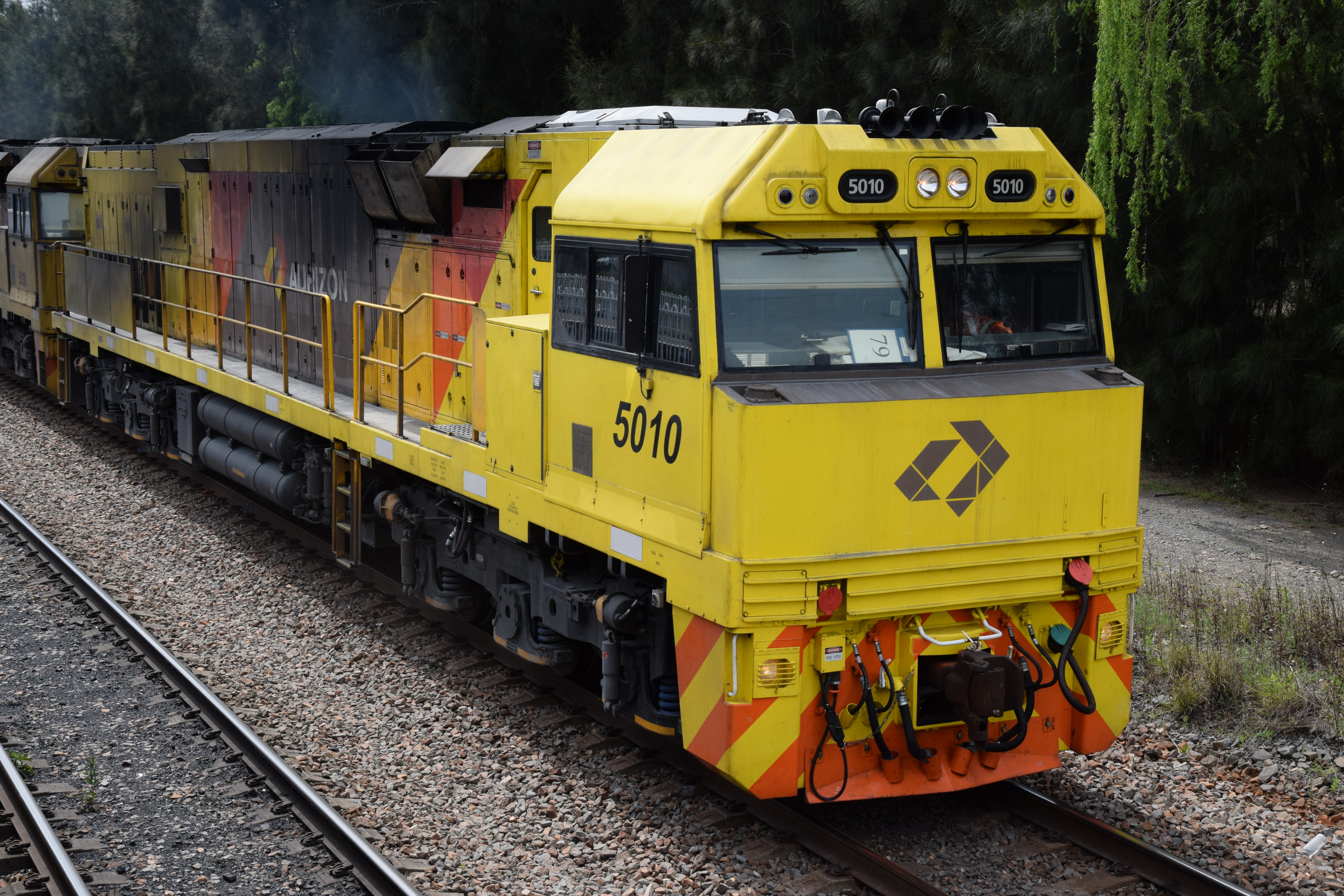
- 5010, under Aurizon branding, nearing Sandgate, NSW in 2018
Type and origin
- Power type: Diesel-electric
- Builder: UGL Rail, Broadmeadow
- Model: General Electric C40aci
- Build date: 2005–2007
Specifications
- Configuration
  - UIC: Co-Co
- Gauge: 1,435 mm (4 ft 8 1/2 in)
- Length: 20.83 m (68 ft 4 in)
- Width: 2.94 m (9 ft 8 in)
- Height: 4.25 m (13 ft 11 in)
- Loco weight: 176 tonnes
- Fuel type: Diesel
- Fuel capacity: 9,900 L (2,200 imp gal)
- Prime mover: GE 7FDL-16
- Alternator: GE GMG192
- Traction motors: GE 5GEB13
- Cylinders: 16
Career
- Operators: Aurizon
- Number in class: 12
- Numbers: 5001–5012
- First run: May 2005
- Last run: june 2007
- Current owner: Aurizon
- Disposition: 12 in service

The 5000 class are a class of diesel locomotive built by United Group Rail, Broadmeadow for QR National between 2005 and 2007.

== History ==
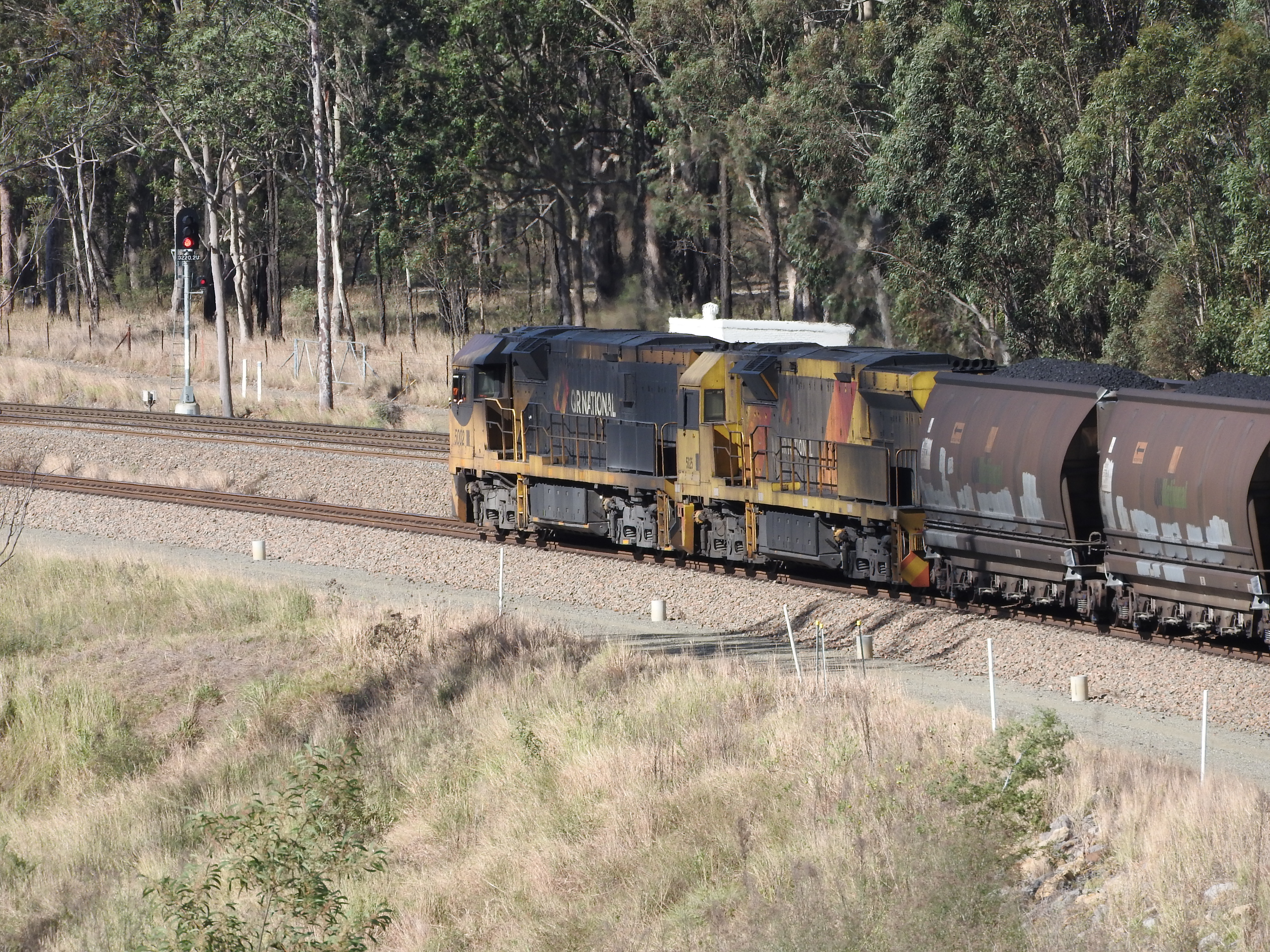
5002 and 5025 at Belford, NSW

In 2004, QR National ordered twelve 5000 class locomotives from United Group Rail. They were a heavy haulage version of the NR class and were purchased to haul coal trains from Mount Arthur coal mine, Muswellbrook in the Hunter Valley. Each locomotive utilises the 3169kw (4250 hp) General Electric 7FDL16 power plant also seen in American locomotives such as the Dash 9. GE 5GEB13 AC traction motors transfer this power to the rail through bogies in the Co-Co formation. The 5000 class weighs approximately 180 tonnes.

In 2012 QR National was rebranded as Aurizon and a number of 5000 class locomotives were repainted into the new yellow Aurizon livery. 5000 class locomotives are often seen operating in Distributed Power mode with one unit at the front of the train and one at the rear either with other 5000 class units or 5020 class units. A third locomotive is required for heavier trains.
