= Home valuation code of conduct =

The Home Valuation Code of Conduct (HVCC or the 'Code') is an American document created jointly by members of Freddie Mac and the Federal Housing Finance Agency, along with the New York State Attorney General.

The document states effective May 1, 2009, Freddie Mac will no longer purchase mortgages from sellers that do not adopt the code with respect to single-family mortgages that are delivered to Freddie Mac.

Also, effective for single-family mortgages made after May 1, 2009, Freddie Mac seller/servicers must represent and warrant that the appraisal report is obtained in a manner consistent with the Code.

Certain types of mortgages are excluded from the Code, including: FHA/VA mortgages, Section 184 Native American mortgages, and section 502 Guaranteed Rural Housing Mortgages.
