= QR National 5020 class =

Class of Australian diesel-electric locomotives

Aurizon 5020 class
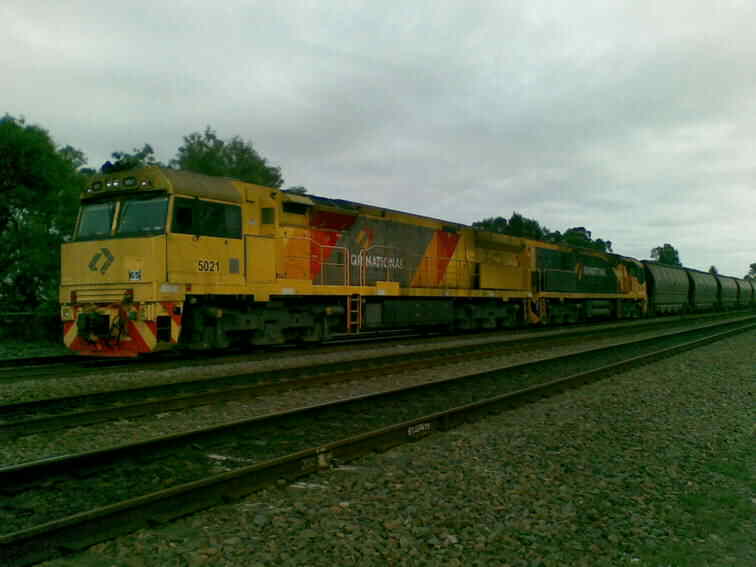
- Aurizon 5020 Class
Type and origin
- Power type: Diesel-electric
- Builder: UGL Rail, Chullora
- Model: General Electric C44acHi
- Build date: 2010–2024
Specifications
- Configuration
  - UIC: Co′Co′
  - Commonwealth: Co-Co
- Gauge: 1,435 mm (4 ft 8 1/2 in)
- Length: 20.83 m (68 ft 4 in)
- Width: 2.94 m (9 ft 8 in)
- Height: 4.25 m (13 ft 11 in)
- Loco weight: 180 tonnes
- Fuel type: Diesel
- Prime mover: GE 7FDL-16
- Aspiration: Turbocharged
- Alternator: GE GMG192
- Traction motors: GE 5GEB13
- Cylinders: 16
Performance figures
- Power output: 3,400 kW (4,500 hp)
Career
- Operators: Aurizon
- Number in class: 25
- Numbers: 5021–5045
- Delivered: 2010
- First run: 2010
- Last run: 2024
- Current owner: Aurizon
- Disposition: 25 in service

The 5020 class is a class of diesel locomotive built by UGL Rail, Chullora for Aurizon in 2010-2024.

== Design ==
In November 2010 ordered 25 Locomotives As 5020 class haul coal trains in the Hunter Valley. They are a heavy haul variant of the UGL Rail C44aci, with C44aci models being a medium weight, power improved version of the heavy haul UGL-GE C40aci Aurizon 5000 class.
