= Hunter Valley Coal Chain =

Chain of coal delivery in New South Wales, Australia

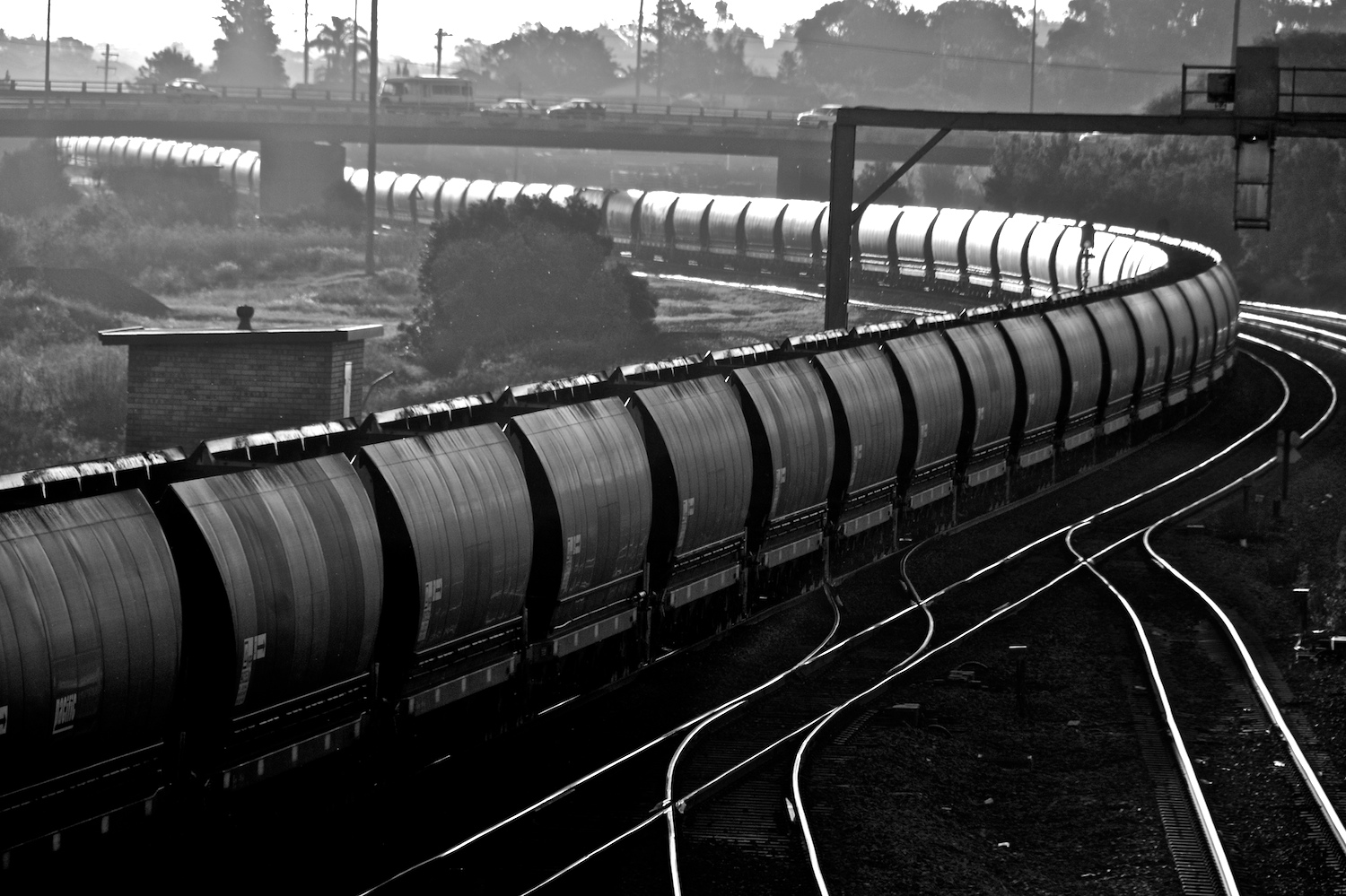
An empty coal train heads west through Maitland bound for the coal mines

The Hunter Valley Coal Chain (HVCC) is a method of coal delivery in New South Wales, Australia from (mainly open-cut) coal mines in the Hunter Valley to the Port of Newcastle and domestic coal-fired power stations in the Hunter Valley. The HVCC essentially follows the path of the Hunter River travelling south-east from the mining areas in the Hunter Valley to Newcastle.

The HVCC mainly deals in the sea-borne export coal trade, especially to Asia. It is one of six major coal chains in Australia:

- four in Queensland: Abbot Point, Dalrymple Bay/Hay Point, Gladstone and Brisbane; and
- two in New South Wales: the Ports of Newcastle (also known as Port Waratah) and Port Kembla.

The port of Newcastle is the world's largest coal export port. Rising demand for coal, particularly in the Asian region has resulted in a strong increase in the volume of coal exported through the port. In 2013 port throughput was 150.5 million tonnes, up from 68 million tonnes in 2000.

== The chain ==
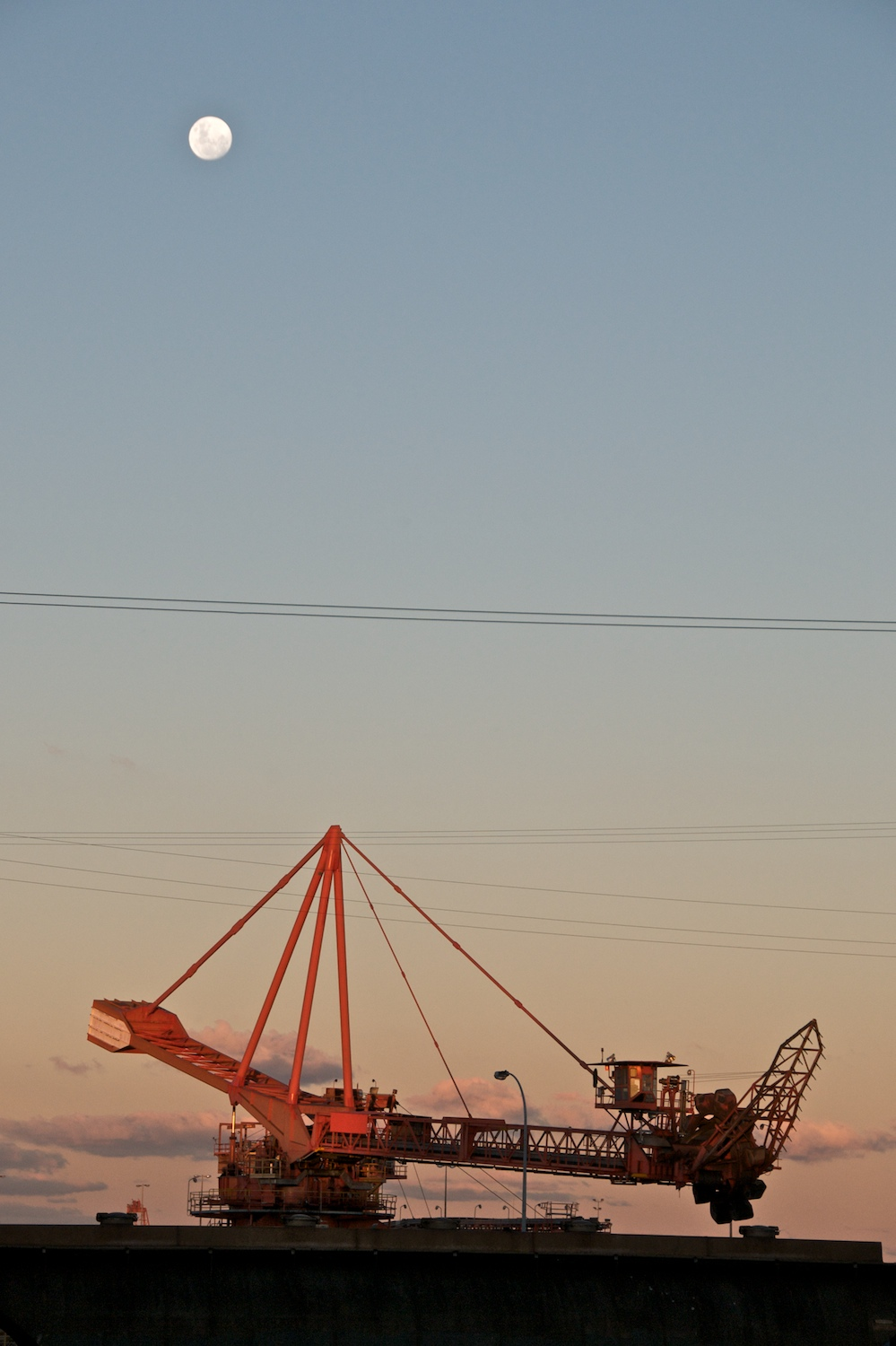
Coal loader at Port Waratah, Newcastle

Coal generally goes through the following stages between mine and port:

- The producer makes arrangements to sell coal to a buyer on certain terms.
- The coal is mined (most of the coal mines in the Hunter Valley are open cut mines, also known as open pit mines), processed, blended and stored either at a railway siding located at the mine or at a coal loading facility (used by several mines).
- The coal is then transported to the Port of Newcastle, almost exclusively by rail. Some coal is transported to the port by road, but this generally requires permission from the local council (due to the effect on roadways and other infrastructure) and is also usually more costly per tonne than rail transport.
- The coal is offloaded at the port onto stockpiles in the Port Waratah Coal Services and Newcastle Coal Infrastructure Group facilities.
- Once the vessel arrives at the port, the coal is loaded onto the vessel.
- The vessel then transports the coal to its destination determined by the buyer.

== HVCCC ==
In 2003 the Hunter Valley Coal Chain Logistics Team (HVCCLT) was established to improve the movement of coal from Hunter Valley mines to the port's coal loaders and then to markets across the globe. In 2009 the Hunter Valley coal industry went through a detailed view and major restructure of the contractual arrangements for the movement of coal. As a result, the Hunter Valley Coal Chain Coordinator (HVCCC) formally replaced the HVCCLT in August 2009 and expanded to include all Hunter Valley coal chain producers and service providers.

HVCCC coordinates the resources of port operators Newcastle Port Corporation, terminal operators Port Waratah Coal Services and Newcastle Coal Infrastructure Group, railway operators Aurizon, One Rail Australia and Pacific National, railway infrastructure managers Australian Rail Track Corporation and Producers.

=== Producers ===
The major coal producers in the Hunter Valley are:

- Bengalla
- BHP
- Bloomfield Collieries
- Centennial Coal
- Glencore
- Hunter Valley Operations (a joint venture of Yancoal and Glencore)
- Idemitsu
- MACH Energy
- Peabody Energy
- Whitehaven Coal
- Yancoal

=== Consumers ===
Most coal produced in the Hunter Valley is sold directly by coal mines (producers) to overseas buyers. About 20% of coal is sold by traders who do not mine coal but act as agents or intermediaries in coal sales.

The majority of Australian coal was traditionally sold to Japanese steel mills or power utilities in accordance with long-term contracts. Those contracts were the subject of annual price and volume negotiations. The Japanese steel mills, operating in a co-ordinated manner and collectively known as the "JSM", negotiated prices for coking coal. One of the steel mills would be appointed as the lead negotiator for the initial contracts with producers. Prices in subsequent contracts would be based on these 'benchmark prices', adjusted for coal quality. This led to "JSM terms" being the benchmark for the industry. While coal is still sold under JSM terms, a greater variety of other contract terms now exist.

== Rail infrastructure ==
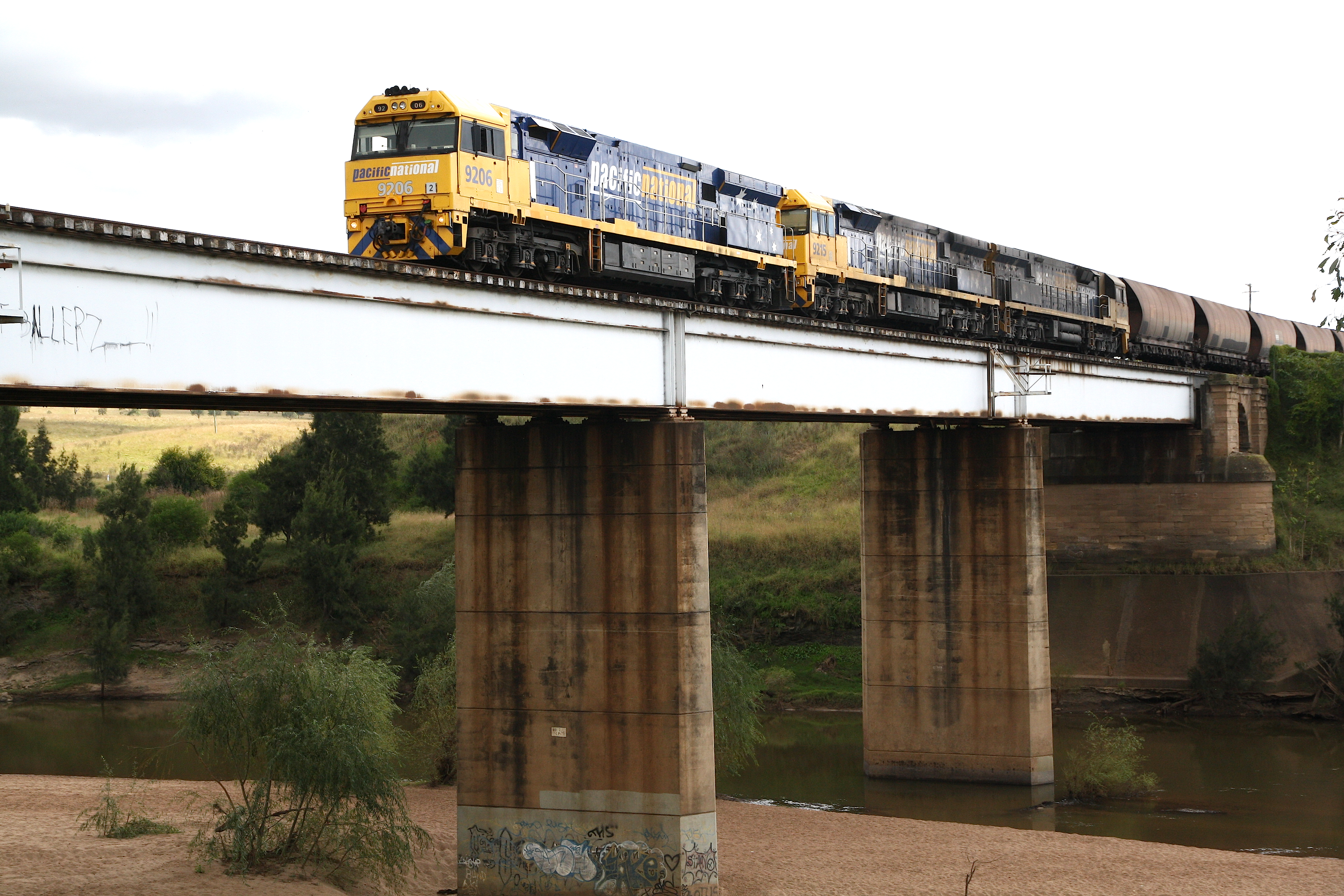
Pacific National hauled coal train crossing the Hunter River at Singleton in April 2012

The railway corridor used is part of the Main North line. In January 1968, the New South Wales Government Railway opened a line opened from the Main North line to Kooragang Island.

The Hunter Valley infrastructure is owned by the State Government and managed by the Federal Government owned Australian Rail Track Corporation under a 60-year lease until 2064. In November 1994, it was announced that the line would be opened up to other operators. Prior to only FreightCorp and its predecessors operated trains. The other infrastructure associated with coal transport, such as load points, is privately owned, usually by a mine or a coal loader.

West of Maitland the line is formed of two tracks, with three in places, with the lines being shared with passenger trains operated by NSW TrainLink. East of Maitland the line is formed of four tracks with the southern pair exclusively for the use of coal trains with an underpass at Hanbury west of Waratah allowing trains to reach Port Waratah without having to interface with the northern pair of tracks. In 2006 the Sandgate Flyover was opened to similarly allow trains to access Kooragang Island. As at December 2012 there were 50 to 60 coal trains per day up to 1.5 kilometres in length.

To alleviate congestion which frequently sees loaded trains queuing, in November 2013 construction commenced on five relief roads at Hexham located between the two running lines, with the westbound line relocated further south. This allows coal trains to be pass one another and reach the ports in a more logical order. It is scheduled for completion in 2015.

Aurizon, One Rail Australia and Pacific National provide locomotives and freight wagons to operate coal trains. One Rail Australia provide crews to operate Xstrata owned rolling stock, with Pacific National doing likewise for Whitehaven Coal and Southern Shorthaul Railroad for Centennial Coal.

== Port Waratah Coal Services ==
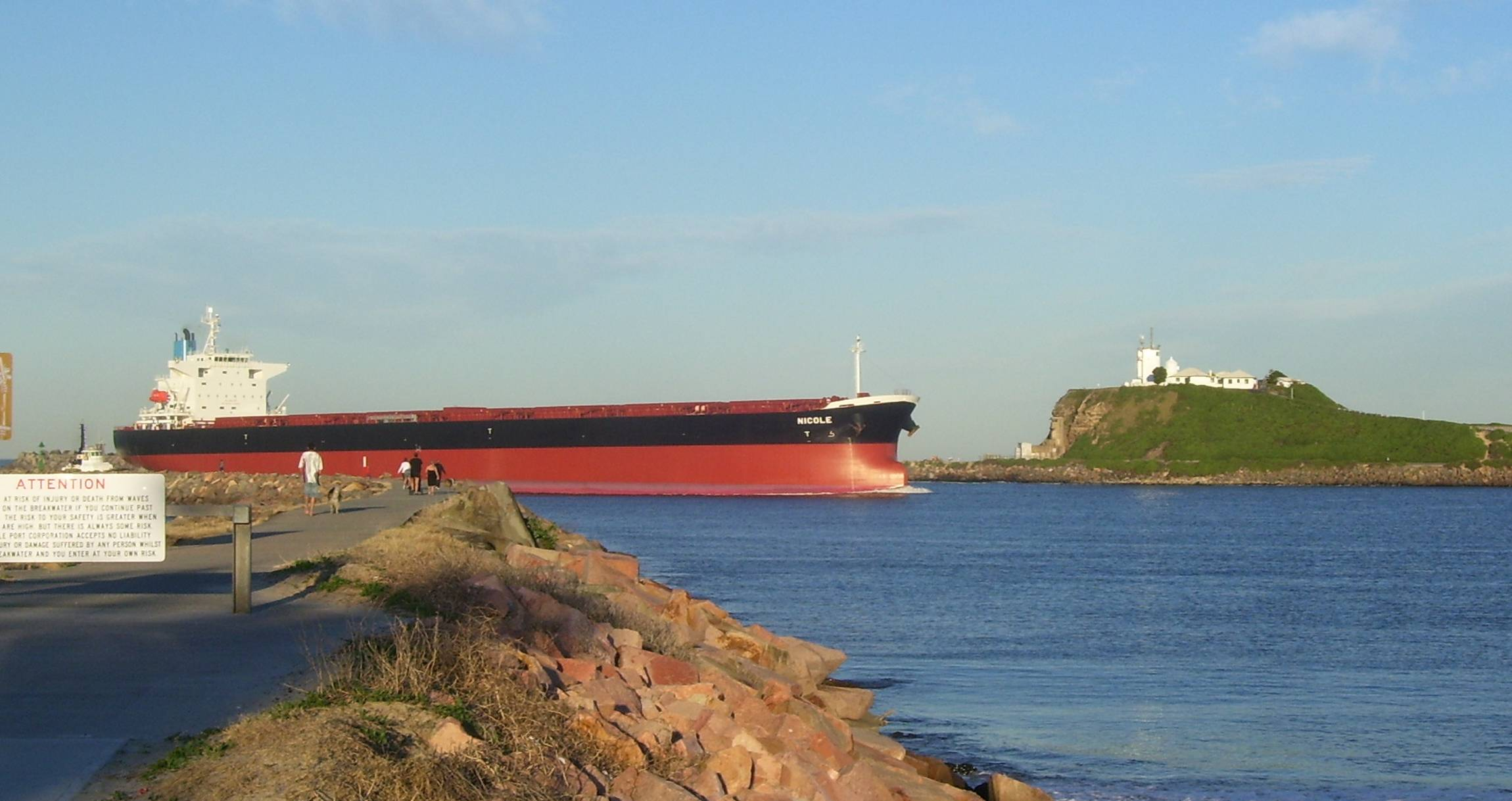
Bulk carrier Nicole entering Newcastle Harbour in August 2007

Port Waratah Coal Services Limited (PWCS) operates the main coal export facilities in Newcastle. The coal export facilities consist of two coal loading terminals, located on either side of the South Channel of the Hunter River. These are known as the Kooragang Coal Terminal, on Kooragang Island and the Carrington Coal Terminal in the suburb of Carrington. Each of those terminals comprises equipment for the delivery and storage of coal to the terminal and for the loading of coal onto vessels. PWCS leases the land on which the port is situated from the Government of New South Wales under an agreement which states that the port is maintained as a 'common user facility'.

The coal export facilities operated by PWCS have a total capacity of 133 million tonnes per annum (Mtpa):

- Carrington coal terminal has a shiploading capacity of 25 Mtpa. It has berth space for two vessels and shiploading facilities that operate at 2,500 tonnes per hour (tph). Carrington Coal Terminal is able to accept coal deliveries by either road or rail.
- Kooragang coal terminal has a shiploading capacity of 108 Mtpa. It has berth space for four vessels and shiploading facilities which can operate at 10,500 tph. Kooragang Coal Terminal is able to accept coal deliveries by rail only.
- Kooragang coal terminal has been undergoing expansion due to demand since inception. Further expansion is currently underway to take total PWCS capacity to nominally 145 Mtpa by the end of 2012.

The distribution of loading between Carrington and Kooragang Coal terminals is dependent on a number of factors:

- Capesize type vessels usually berth at Kooragang Coal Terminal due to their larger size. However, they are also able to load at the Carrington Coal Terminal. Handysize type vessels are loaded at Carrington Coal Terminal also due to their size. 'Panamax' class vessels may be loaded at either Kooragang Coal Terminal or Carrington Coal Terminal.
- Coal which is to be delivered by road may only be delivered to Carrington Coal Terminal, and therefore any vessels which are to be loaded with road coal must be loaded at Carrington Coal Terminal.
- If the vessel to be loaded is geared, that is, it has equipment on deck, then the vessel will usually be scheduled to berth at Carrington Coal Terminal, as the shiploaders at Carrington Coal Terminal are smaller and are therefore more easily able to move in and about equipment on the deck of a vessel.
- Remaining vessels are then scheduled to ensure an even queue of vessels is maintained between the Kooragang Coal Terminal and Carrington Coal Terminal. If the queue for one of the terminals is substantially longer than for the other terminal, the schedule may be amended to ensure that the queues are kept reasonably even.

== Newcastle Coal Infrastructure Group ==
Newcastle Coal Infrastructure Group (NCIG) operates the third coal export facility in Newcastle. Its terminal is also situated on Kooragang Island and has a capacity of 30 million tonnes per annum but it has the development approval for construction of a loader with a capacity of 66 million tonnes per annum for that site. NCIG is developing the site in stages. The company loaded its first ship in the first quarter of 2010. Full 30 million tonnes per annum operations were expected in the first quarter of 2011.

== Capacity distribution systems ==
While productivity in supply chains is an issue for industries of all sizes, few industries have to deal with a network as broad and a demand as pressing as the coal industry.

As at December 2012 Coal accounted for 18% of Australia's exports. But while Australia has an abundance of coal and a ravenous world market, particularly in Asia (especially China, with its expanding need for coal in the steel industry), willing to devour it is disadvantaged by the distance that must be overcome to get the product to the market and the huge number of players involved.

It is for this reason that the supply chain must run as smoothly as possible, moving the raw product from the mines, to the port and onto the ships no easy task. In 2011 Australia exported 281 million tonnes of coal and moved 97% of this by rail.

But over the last five years, getting the coal to these ports, onto the ships and to the market proved to be a difficult operation as the Chinese and other Asian markets demand soared. Freight bottlenecks rapidly developed, primarily at the Dalrymple Bay Coal Terminal and at Newcastle's Port Waratah.

To cope with these bottlenecks, the terminal operators developed capacity management systems to cope with the volumes.

The two hubs developed independent yet similar systems to cope with the problem of how to reduce queues, with Port Waratah using a Capacity Balancing System and Dalrymple Bay a Queue Management System.

The Port Waratah model allocates production from the mines to available shipping in a way that maximises the capacity of the terminal.

Since August 2003, there has been evidence that the Hunter Valley coal export infrastructure has been stretched and that some coal export growth might have been lost as a result of constraints in the system. In response to this situation, Port Waratah Coal Services (manager of the Kooragang coal terminal located on Kooragang Island and Carrington coal terminals at the Newcastle Port) applied to the Australian Competition & Consumer Commission (ACCC) to implement a short term capacity distribution system to allocate the current capacity of the coal supply chain to existing coal exporters. This scheme was implemented in June 2004 and interim authorisation to continue a modified version of the scheme until December 2007 – called the medium term capacity distribution system – has been granted by the ACCC.
