= ALCO DL531 =

Alco DL531
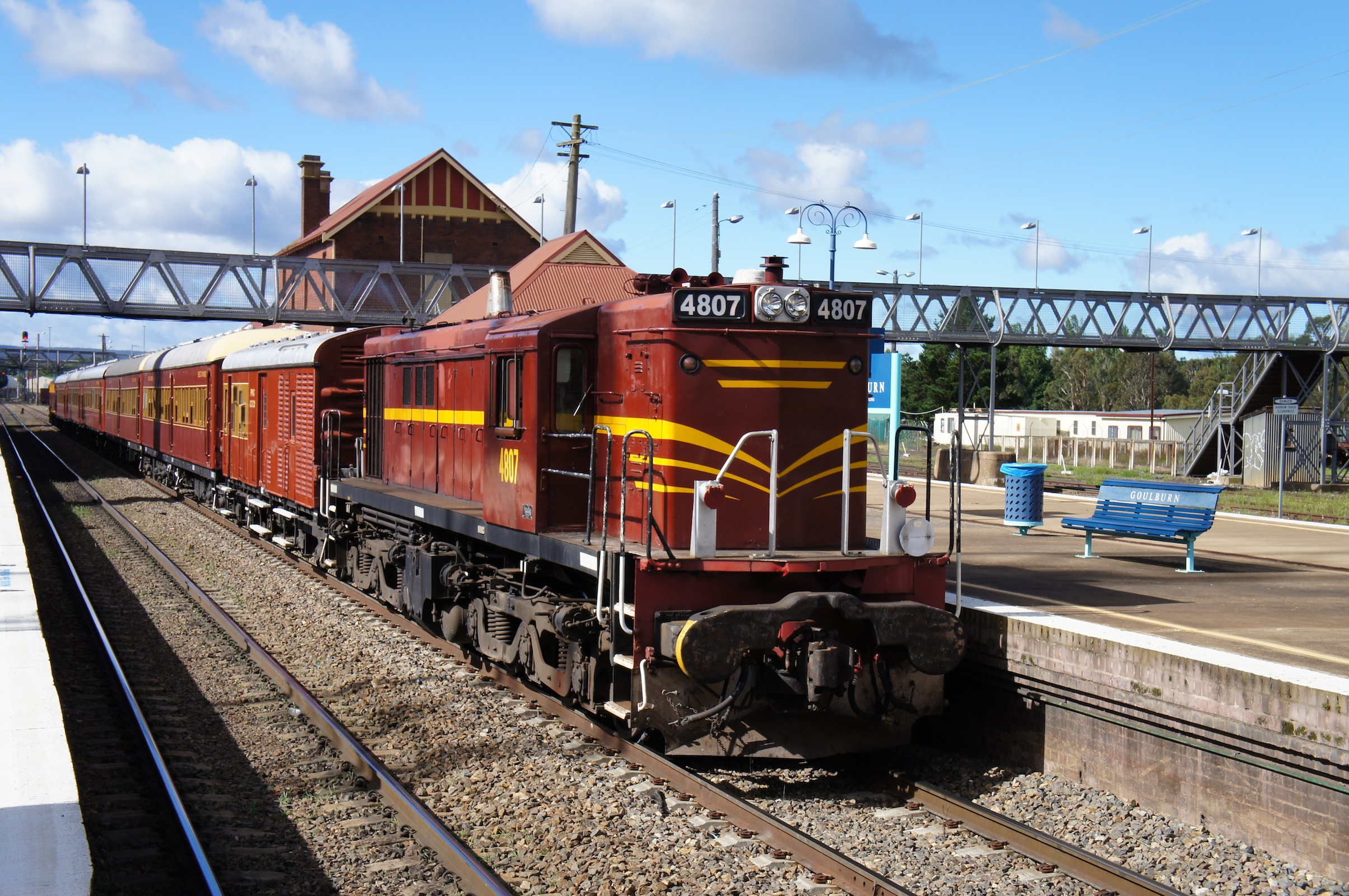
- Preserved New South Wales Government Railways 4807 at Goulburn in March 2012
Type and origin
- Power type: Diesel-electric
- Builder: AE Goodwin, Auburn
- Build date: 1958-1970
- Total produced: 295
Specifications
- Configuration
  - UIC: Co-Co
- Gauge: 1,067 mm (3 ft 6 in); 1,435 mm (4 ft 8 1/2 in); 1,600 mm (5 ft 3 in)
- Wheel diameter: 40 in (1,016 mm)
- Length: Over headstocks: 44 ft 3 in (13.49 m); Over coupler pulling faces: 48 ft 5 in (14.76 m)
- Width: 9 ft 9 in (2.97 m)
- Height: 14 ft 0 in (4.27 m)
- Loco weight: 74 long tons 0 cwt (165,800 lb or 75.2 t)-76 long tons 12 cwt (171,600 lb or 77.8 t)
- Fuel type: Diesel
- Fuel capacity: 500 imp gal (2,300 L; 600 US gal)-700 imp gal (3,200 L; 840 US gal)
- Prime mover: ALCO 6-251B
- RPM range: 375–1025
- Engine type: Four-stroke diesel
- Aspiration: Turbocharged
- Generator: General Electric 5GT 584; Associated Electrical Industries TG 3602
- Traction motors: General Electric 761; Associated Electrical Industries 253 CT
- Cylinders: Inline 6
Career
- Operators: New South Wales Government Railways; South Australian Railways; Silverton Tramway
- Number in class: 212
- Numbers: 4801-48165; 830-873; 27-29
- First run: September 1959
- Preserved: 4801, 4803, 4805, 4807, 4821, 4822, 4833, 866
- Current owner: Genesee & Wyoming Australia; Graincorp; Greentrains; Junee Railway Workshop; Pacific National; Transport Asset Holding Entity

The Alco DL531, also known as the RSD-8, is a model of railway locomotive manufactured and operated in various countries.

A total of 295 were manufactured in Australia between 1958 and 1970 by that country's American Locomotive Company licensee AE Goodwin, Auburn.

The New South Wales Government Railways purchased 165 48 class between 1958 and 1970. They were the largest class of diesel locomotives purchased and operated services on all lines in New South Wales.

The South Australian Railways 830 class were purchased in batches between 1958 and 1970 and operated services throughout South Australia on the narrow, standard and broad gauge lines. In the early 1980s some were transferred to AN Tasrail.

The Silverton Rail purchased three narrow gauge examples for use on the Silverton Tramway line around Broken Hill.

Mass withdrawals began in the 1990s but as at February 2014 about 90 remained in use.

DL531s also operated in Brazil, Pakistan and Peru. A Bo-Bo variant, the DL532 (aka the RS8), operated in Jamaica, Greece and South Korea.

== See also ==
- New South Wales 48 class locomotive
- South Australian Railways 830 class
- Silverton Tramway 48s class
