= Junee Roundhouse Railway Museum =

Coordinates: 34°53′0.77″S 147°34′45.14″E

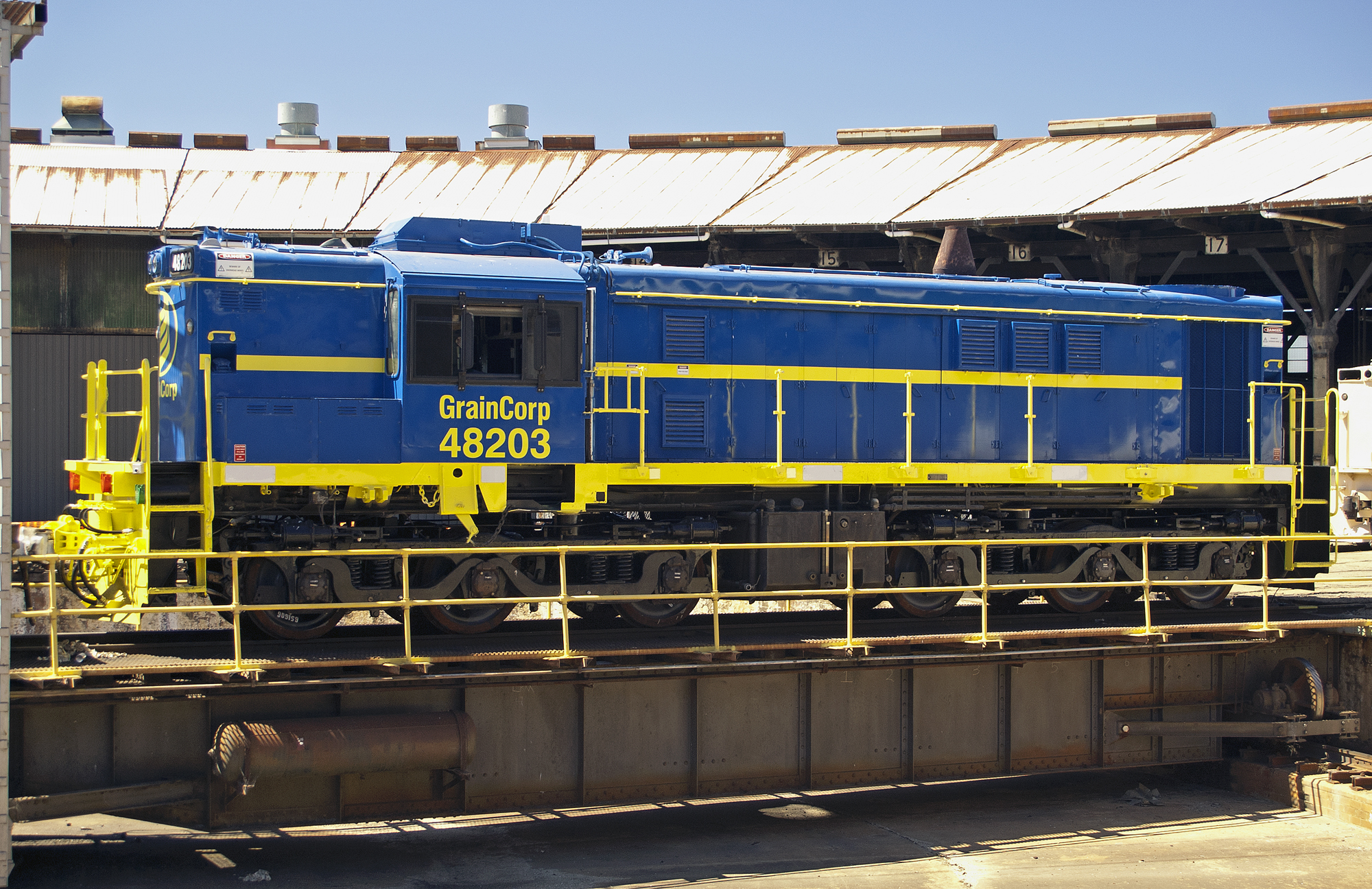
GrainCorp's 48203 at Junee Locomotive Depot in March 2011

The Junee Roundhouse Railway Museum (under the organisation name Regional Heritage Transport Association) preserves the former Junee Locomotive Depot, a railway depot located on the Main Southern line in Junee, Australia.

== History ==
The Junee Locomotive Depot was built by the New South Wales Government Railways when the line from Sydney opened to Junee in 1878. On 29 September 1947, a 42 road, fully covered roundhouse was completed. This was the last steam locomotive depot built by the New South Wales Government Railways. As well as being the depot for locomotives on various branch lines, it was strategically important being located half-way between Sydney and Melbourne. On 9 July 1993, the State Rail Authority closed the depot.

In December 1994, Junee Council leased the roundhouse with part of it sublet to Austrac Ready Power who restored several ex State Rail Authority engines at the site as well as rebuilding engines for BHP, Port Kembla with the other part set up as a museum.

Following Austrac Ready Power ceasing operations in September 2000, the depot lease was taken over by Junee Railway Workshop.

Since April 2010, Junee Railway Workshop has been overhauling a fleet of eighteen 48 class locomotives for GrainCorp.

The building features a 100-foot (30.5 m) turntable, and part is still used for commercial reconditioning and the rebuilding of locomotives.

== Exhibits ==
The museum's displays include a working steam-driven accident crane 1080, a water tank wagon which was part of a breakdown train, a mail car, several miniature trains, trikes, steam locomotives 2413 and 3609, and diesel locomotive 4872.

== See also ==
- Sydney Electric Train Society
