= South Australian Railways 830 class =

Class of Australian diesel-electric locomotives

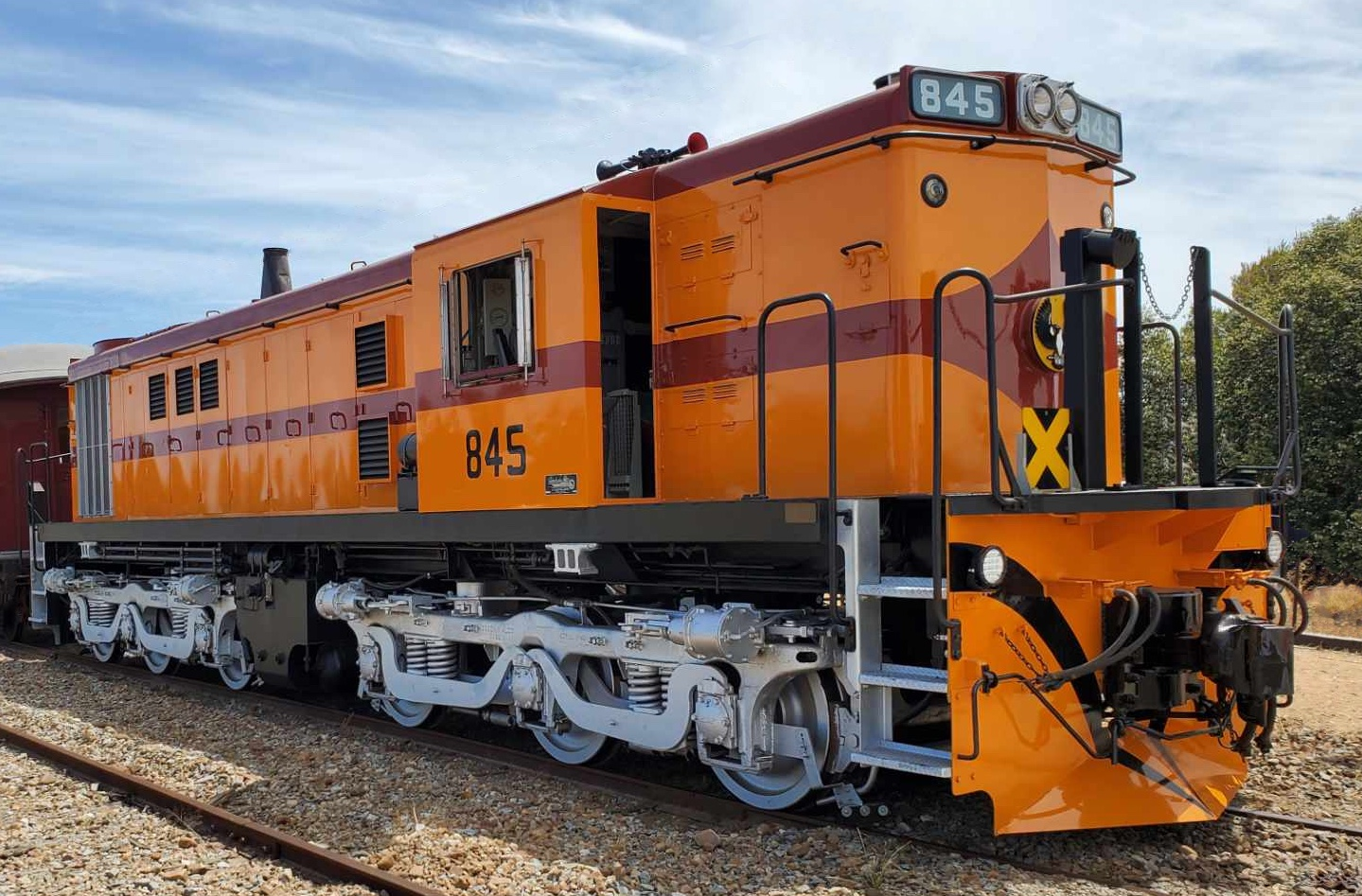
- 830 class loco no 845 in South Australian Railways livery, newly refurbished by SteamRanger Heritage Railway, in front of a tourist "cockle train" at Middleton in 2026
Type and origin
- Power type: Diesel-electric
- Builder: AE Goodwin, Auburn
- Serial number: Alco 83721-83730; Alco 83826; Alco 84136-84142; Alco 84702-84719; Alco G-3422-01 to G-3422-03; Alco G-6016-01 to G-6016-06
- Model: Alco DL531
- Build date: 1959–1966
- Total produced: 45
- Rebuilder: Australian National
- Rebuild date: 1992–1998
- Number rebuilt: 7
Specifications
- Configuration
  - UIC: Co-Co
- Gauge: 1,600 mm (5 ft 3 in); 1,435 mm (4 ft 8 1/2 in); 1,067 mm (3 ft 6 in)
- Wheel diameter: 40 in (1,016 mm)
- Length: Over headstocks: 44 ft 3 in (13.49 m), Over coupler pulling faces: 48 ft 5 in (14.76 m)
- Width: 9 ft 9 in (2.97 m)
- Height: 14 ft 0 in (4.27 m)
- Axle load: 12 long tons 6 cwt (27,600 lb or 12.5 t)
- Loco weight: 74 long tons 0 cwt (165,800 lb or 75.2 t)
- Fuel type: Diesel
- Fuel capacity: 500 imp gal (2,300 L; 600 US gal)
- Lubricant cap.: 116 imp gal (530 L; 139 US gal)
- Coolant cap.: 90 imp gal (410 L; 110 US gal)
- Sandbox cap.: 10 cu ft (0.28 m^{3})
- Prime mover: Alco 6-251B
- RPM range: 375-1025
- Engine type: Four-stroke Inline 6 diesel
- Aspiration: Turbocharged
- Generator: General Electric 5GT 584
- Traction motors: General Electric 761
- Cylinders: 6
- Cylinder size: 9 in × 10.5 in (229 mm × 267 mm)
Performance figures
- Maximum speed: 75 mph (121 km/h)
- Power output: Gross: 950 hp (710 kW), For traction: 900 hp (670 kW)
- Tractive effort: Continuous: 40,200 lbf (178.82 kN) at 8 mph (13 km/h)
Career
- Operators: Aurizon; Pacific National; QUBE Logistics; Junee Railway Workshop; Southern Shorthaul Railroad; SteamRanger Heritage Railway
- Number in class: 45
- Numbers: 830–874
- First run: December 1959
- Last run: December 1959
- Retired: January 1970
- Preserved: 8
- Current owner: Aurizon; Pacific National; QUBE Logistics; Junee Railway Workshop; Southern Shorthaul Railroad; SteamRanger Heritage Railway
- Disposition: 7 in service, 8 preserved, 8 stored, 22 scrapped

The 830 class are a class of diesel locomotives built by AE Goodwin, Auburn for the South Australian Railways between 1959 and 1966. The New South Wales 48 class and Silverton Rail 48s class are of a very similar design.

== History ==
In 1959, the South Australian Railways placed an order for 10 Alco DL531 locomotives for use in light freight haulage, especially on branch lines where a low axle load was essential. Further orders saw the fleet built up to 44 by February 1970 with 15 narrow gauge, 12 standard gauge and 17 broad gauge examples. In February 1970, an additional unit was purchased second hand from Silverton Tramway.

In March 1978, 43 were included in the transfer of the South Australian Railways to Australian National with the other two (830 and 845) going to the State Transport Authority before also moving to Australian National. From July 1974 until December 1980 847–849, were loaned to the Public Transport Commission where they were pooled with the 48 class.

Following the conversion of the Adelaide to Alice Springs in the early 1980s and the release of some Commonwealth Railways NJ class locomotives, beginning in April 1980, some 830s were transferred to Australian National's TasRail operation with 20 transferred by August 1986. Withdrawals of the TasRail fleet commenced in late 1987 with only three in service by April 1989. Australian National transferred five back to South Australia while two were sold to Silverton Rail and shipped to Broken Hill. One was preserved by the Don River Railway, Devonport. The remainder were scrapped.

In 1991, six were rebuilt as the DA class with new cabs to allow them to be used as shunters. In December 1994 two 48 class locomotives were purchased from the State Rail Authority. One was rebuilt as DA7 and the other scrapped. They were later renumbered as the 900 class.

Australian National's remaining 830 class were all included with the sale of the South Australian freight operations to Australian Southern Railroad in August 1997.

In June 2000, three were sold to ATN Access for use on grain services. All were included in the sale of the business to Pacific National in February 2004, ending up in storage during the first few years of ownership under PN. 833 was scrapped in July 2016, while 845 was given to SteamRanger Heritage Railway, arriving at their Mt Barker depot in July 2017. 838 remains stored in Junee, still wearing primer paint from its never completed overhaul.

When Australian Railroad Group was dissolved, 852 passed to QR National (later Aurizon), while the other 830s and 900 class rebuilds went to Genesee and Wyoming Australia. 852 was sold to Junee Railway Workshop in 2008 and after being overhauled returned to service in 2012.

The remaining ex-GWA 830s and 900s passed to Aurizon in 2022 as part of their purchase of One Rail Australia (GWA's successor). The last ex-GWA 830s in service operated on the Eyre Peninsula Railway, only hauling gypsum trains to Thevenard after the cessation of grain services on the Eyre Peninsula Railway in 2019. All remaining operational ex-GWA 830s at Thevenard were stored upon the arrival of 2300 class locomotives from Queensland in 2023. Some ex-GWA 900s remain as shunters at the Whyalla Steelworks.

Apart from the 2 preserved 830s, most of the operational 830s are based in NSW, usually operating services for Qube Logistics and Southern Shorthaul Railroad.

== Status table ==
The disposition of 830 class locomotives as of 2024 is given in the following table (click "show" to expand):

Key:	In service	Stored	Preserved	Converted	Unknown	Scrapped

Number	Current Number	Serial number	Entered service	Owner	Status	Livery	Gauge	Notes
830	904	83721	Dec 1959	Aurizon	Operational	G&W Orange & Black With Aurizon Logos	SG	Renumbered 875, rebuilt as DA5, renumbered 904, Based At Whyalla
831	831	83722	Feb 1960	Aurizon	Stored, Dry Creek	AN Green & Gold With G&W Logos	BG	
832	902	83723	Apr 1960	Aurizon	Stored, Thevenard	G&W Orange & Black	NG	Rebuilt as DA2, renumbered 902
833	833	83724	Apr 1960	Pacific National	Scrapped	AN Green & Gold	SG	Ex ATN Access
834	834	83725	May 1960	AN Tasrail	Scrapped	AN Green & Gold	NG	
835	DA3	83726	May 1960	Australian Southern Railroad	Scrapped	AN Green & Gold	BG	Rebuilt as DA3, Crashed Rosewater 1997, Scrapped 2001
836	905	83727	Jun 1960	Aurizon	Stored Thevenard	G&W Orange & Black	NG	Rebuilt as DA6, renumbered 905,
837	837	83728	Jun 1960	AN Tasrail	Scrapped	AN Green & Gold	NG	
838	838	83729	Jun 1960	Pacific National	Stored, Junee	Primer	SG	Ex ATN Access, Stored Ex uncompleted overhaul
839	903	83730	Jun 1960	Aurizon	Stored. Whyalla	G&W Orange & Black	NG	Rebuilt as DA4, renumbered 903
840	840	84138	May 1962	AN Tasrail	Scrapped	AN Green & Gold	NG	
841	841	84139	Jun 1962	Aurizon	Stored, Dry Creek	AN Green & Gold With G&W Logos	BG	
842	842	84140	Aug 1962	Genesee & Wyoming Australia	Scrapped	AN Green & Gold	NG	
843	843	84141	Sep 1962	Pichi Richi Railway	Preserved, Under Restoration, Quorn	AN Green & Gold	NG	Ex One Rail Australia.
844	844	84142	Oct 1962	SteamRanger	Preserved, Operational, Mt Barker	SAR Mustard Pot (late)	BG	Ex One Rail Australia
845	845	84714	Oct 1963	SteamRanger	Preserved, Operational, Mt Barker	SAR Mustard Pot (As delivered)	BG	Ex ATN Access and Pacific National
846	846	84715	Nov 1963	Pichi Richi Railway	Preserved, Spare parts for 843	AN green & Gold	NG	Ex AN Tasrail and One Rail Australia
847	847	G-6016-1	Jun 1969	Genesee & Wyoming Australia	Scrapped	G&W Orange & Black	NG	
848	848	G-6016-2	Jul 1969	Genesee & Wyoming Australia	Scrapped	Australian National Green & Gold With G&W Logos	SG	
849	901	G-6016-3	Sep 1969	Aurizon	Operational	G&W Orange & Black	SG	Rebuilt as DA1, renumbered T02, renumbered 901, Based At Whyalla
850	850	84136	Mar 1962	Eyre Peninsula Railway Preservation Society	Preserved, Port Lincoln	G&W Orange & Black	NG	Ex Genesee & Wyoming Australia. Operated only on the Port Lincoln Division
851	851	84137	Apr 1962	Aurizon	Stored	G&W Orange & Black	NG	Operated only on the Port Lincoln Division
852	852	84716	Sep 1963	Junee Railway Workshop	Operational	JRW	SG	
853	853	84717	Oct 1963	AN Tasrail	Scrapped	AN Green & Gold	NG	
854	854	84718	Sep 1963	AN Tasrail	Scrapped	AN Green & Gold	NG	
855	855	84719	Oct 1963	AN Tasrail	Scrapped	AN Green & Gold	NG	
856	856	84702	Feb 1963	Silverton Rail	Scrapped	AN Green & Gold	SG	Ex AN Tasrail
857	48s31	84703	Apr 1963	Greentrains	Scrapped	Silverton Blue & Yellow	SG	Renumbered 48s31, ex AN Tasrail
858	858	84704	May 1963	AN Tasrail	Scrapped	AN Green & Gold	NG	
859	859	84705	May 1963	Aurizon	Stored	G&W Orange & Black	NG	Ex AN Tasrail
860	860	84706	May 1963	AN Tasrail	Scrapped	AN Green & Gold	NG	
861	861	84707	Jun 1963	AN Tasrail	Scrapped	AN Green & Gold	NG	
862	862	84708	Jun 1963	Silverton Rail	Scrapped	AN Green & Gold	SG	Ex AN Tasrail
863	863	84709	Jun 1963	Steamtown Heritage Rail Centre	Preserved, Peterborough	AN Green & Gold	SG	Ex Genesee & Wyoming
864	864	84710	Jul 1963	QUBE Logistics	Operational	Greentrains green & yellow	SG	Renumbered 48s30, ex AN Tasrail
865	865	84711	Jul 1963	Genesee & Wyoming Australia	Scrapped	AN Green & Gold With G&W Logos	NG	Ex AN Tasrail
866	866	84712	Jul 1963	Don River Railway	Preserved, Operational, Devonport	AN Green & Gold	NG	Ex AN Tasrail
867	867	84713	Aug 1963	AN Tasrail	Scrapped	AN Green & Gold	NG	
868	868	G-6016-4	Nov 1969	Australian Railroad Group	Scrapped	AN Green & Gold	SG	
869	869	G-6016-5	Jan 1970	Southern Shorthaul Railroad	Operational	Greentrains green & yellow	SG	
870	906	G-6016-6	Jan 1970	Australian National	Scrapped	AN Green & Gold	NG	
871	871	G-3422-1	Feb 1966	Genesee & Wyoming Australia	Scrapped	AN Green & Gold	NG	Operated only on the Port Lincoln Division
872	872	G-3422-2	Mar 1966	QUBE Logistics	Operational	Greentrains green & yellow	SG	
873	873	G-3422-3	Apr 1966	Pichi Richi Railway	Preserved, Quorn	AN Green & Gold With G&W Logos	NG	Operated in service only on the Port Lincoln Division
874	907	83826	Dec 1960	Aurizon	Operational	G&W Orange & Black with Aurizon Logos	SG	Ex Silverton Tramway 27 Feb 1970, rebuilt as T01, renumbered 907

== Gallery ==
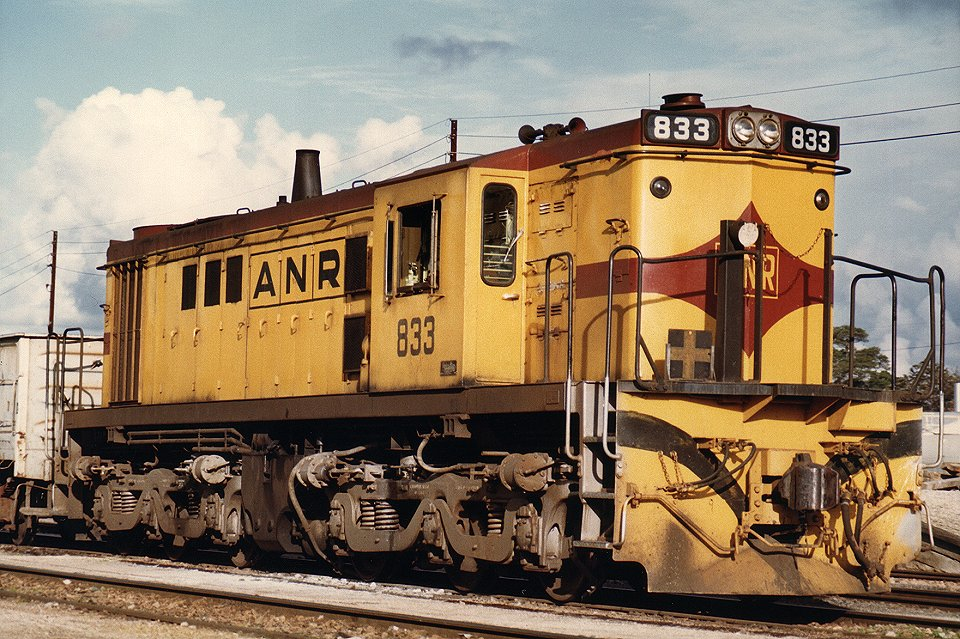

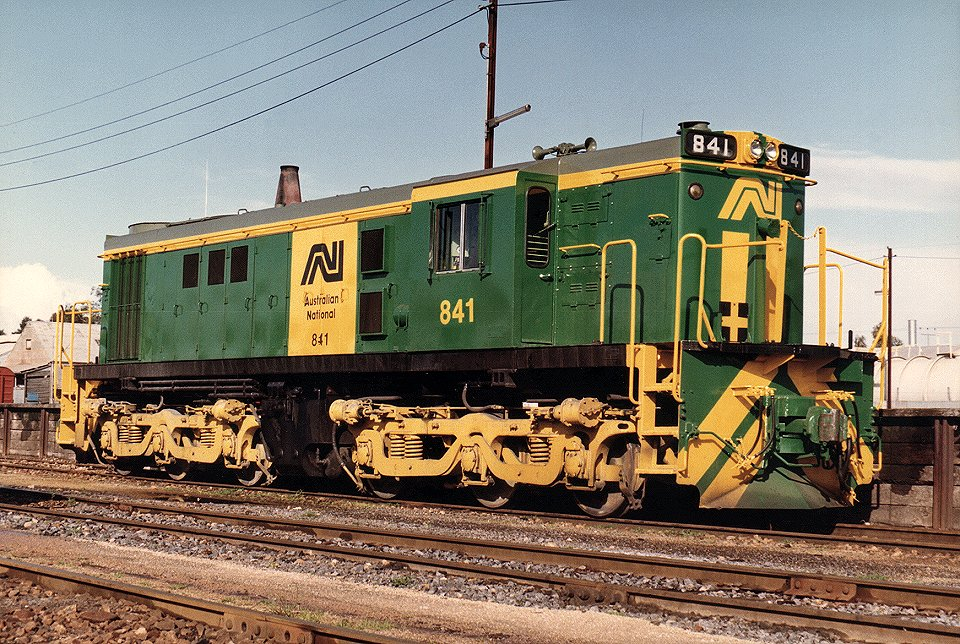

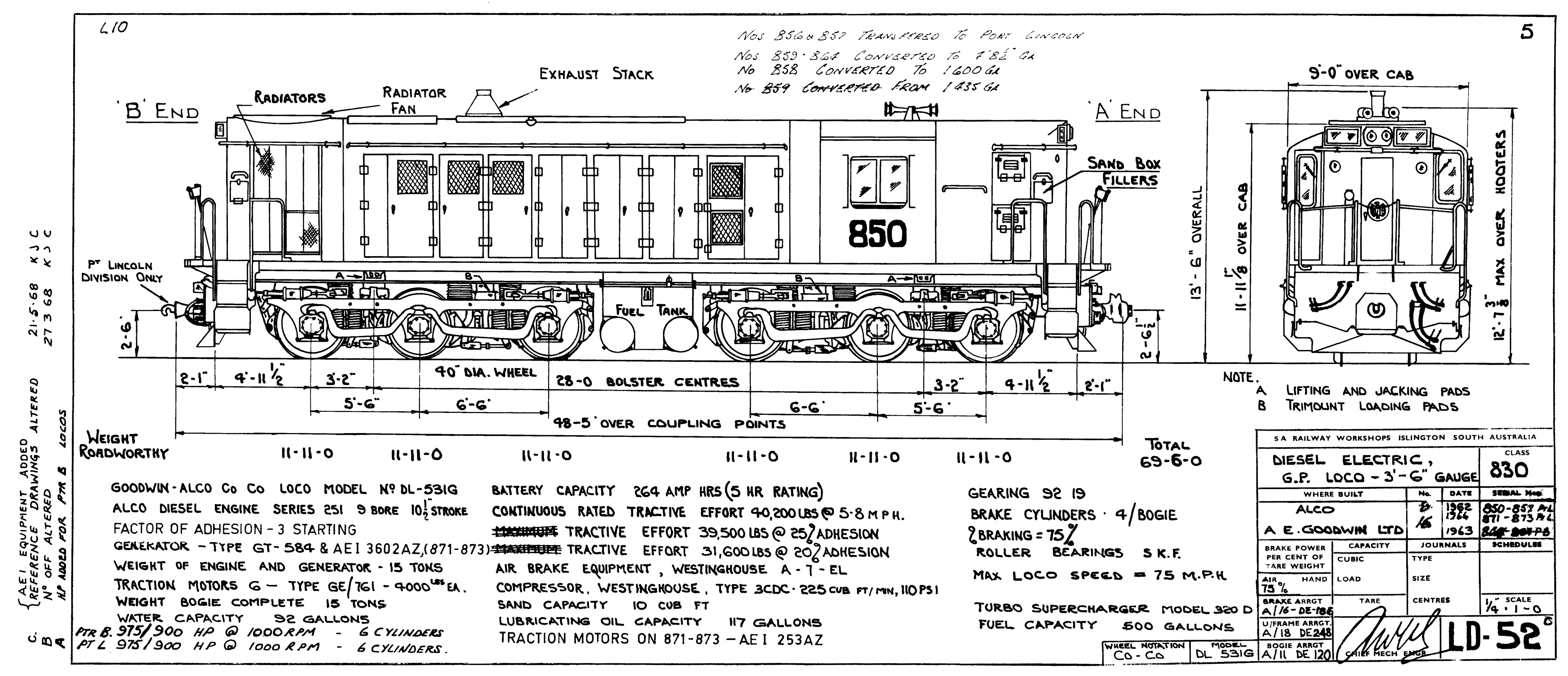

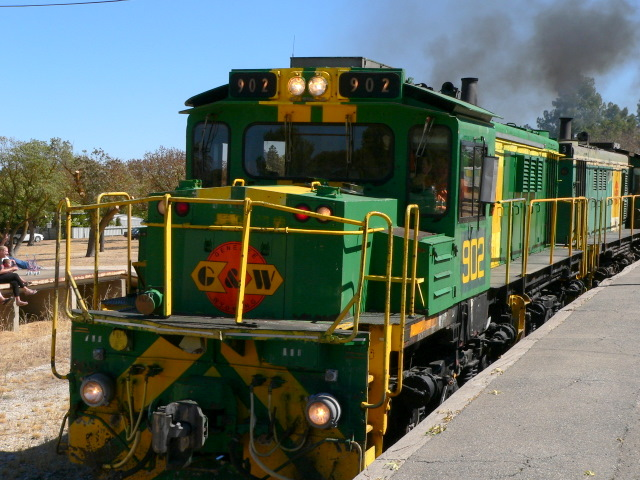

833 in South Australian Railways livery, to which "ANR" branding has been added, in 1983

841 (in 1983) in the livery introduced by AN after it took over the SAR

830 class general arrangement drawing by South Australian Railways

832, which became chop-nosed DA2, re-numbered as Aurizon 902
