= Transport in Victoria (state) =

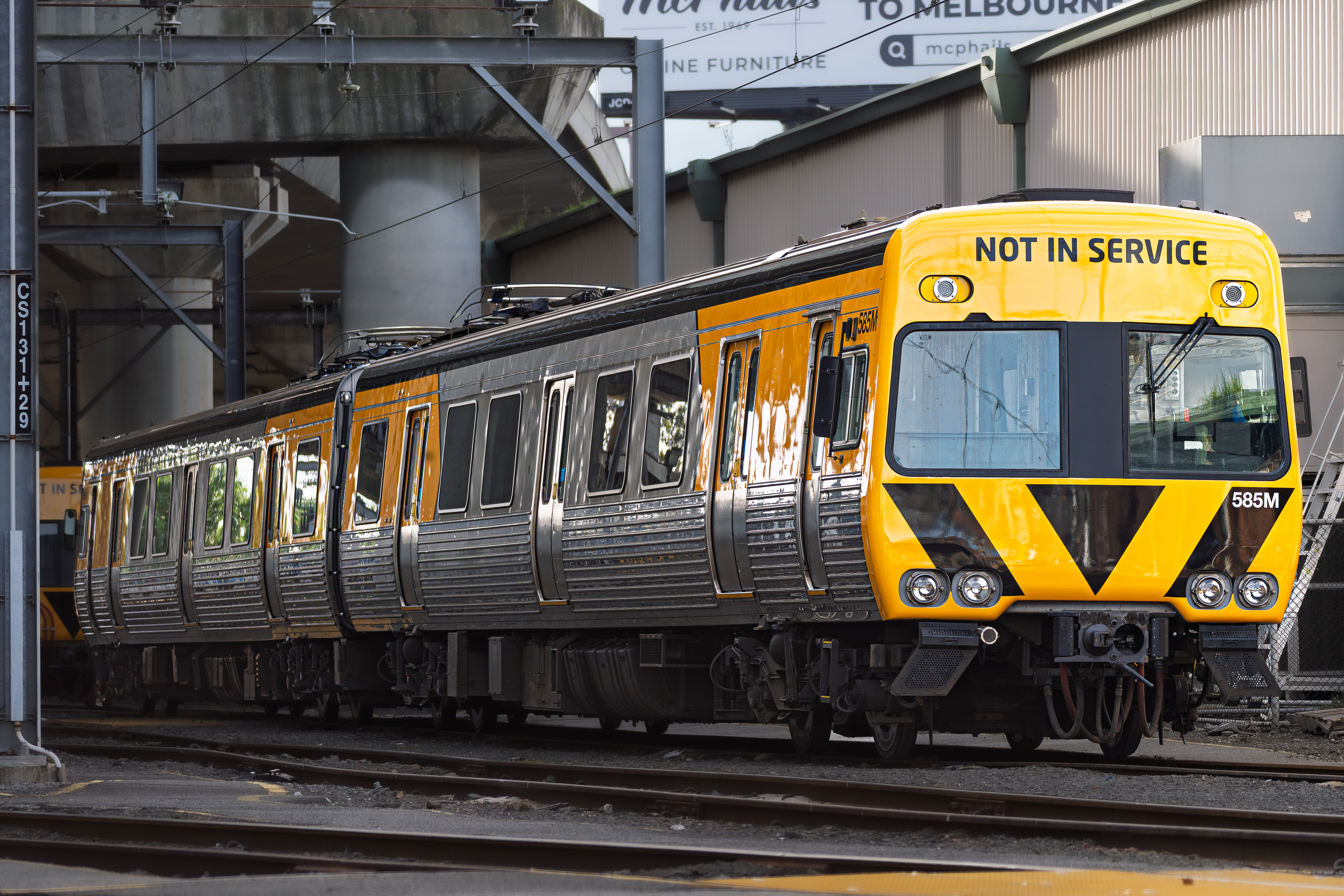
A Comeng train operating in Melbourne

A large multimodal transport network serves the Australian state of Victoria. Some of the modes include road, ferry, air, buses, rail and trams.

== Roads ==
Victoria has a very large number of roads, which range from freeways to arterial and non-arterial roads. These include the Hume Highway, Great Ocean Road, Princes Highway, Great Alpine Road and the Calder Highway.

The main company that manages and maintains the 23,000 kilometres (14,000 mi) of roads in Victoria is the Department of Transport and Planning.

== Rail ==
Victoria has an expansive rail network, with over 4000km of track, using both broad gauge (1600mm) and standard gauge (1435mm) track. There were over 490 million passengers in 2025, riding the states 16 suburban lines and 13 regional rail lines. The two main passenger rail operators are V/Line and Metro.

Rail freight in Victoria is mainly agricultural goods making up 31.4% of all freight, with the other major freight being containers. Freight is operated by companies such as Pacific National, Southern Shorthaul Railroad, Qube Logistics, and GrainCorp.

=== Trams ===
There are three cities in Victoria with trams, being Bendigo, Ballarat and Melbourne. They run using 600v DC overhead power on 1435mm tracks. Melbourne's tram network is the largest in the world, one of the most used networks in the world, with over 1500 stops and 250km of track. Bendigo has a 4.5km tramlines, used only for tourism purposes, while Ballarat has a similar 850m line. The city of Geelong had a tram network that shut down in 1956.
