= Junee Railway Workshop =

Australian railway operator

Junee Railway Workshop Pty Ltd

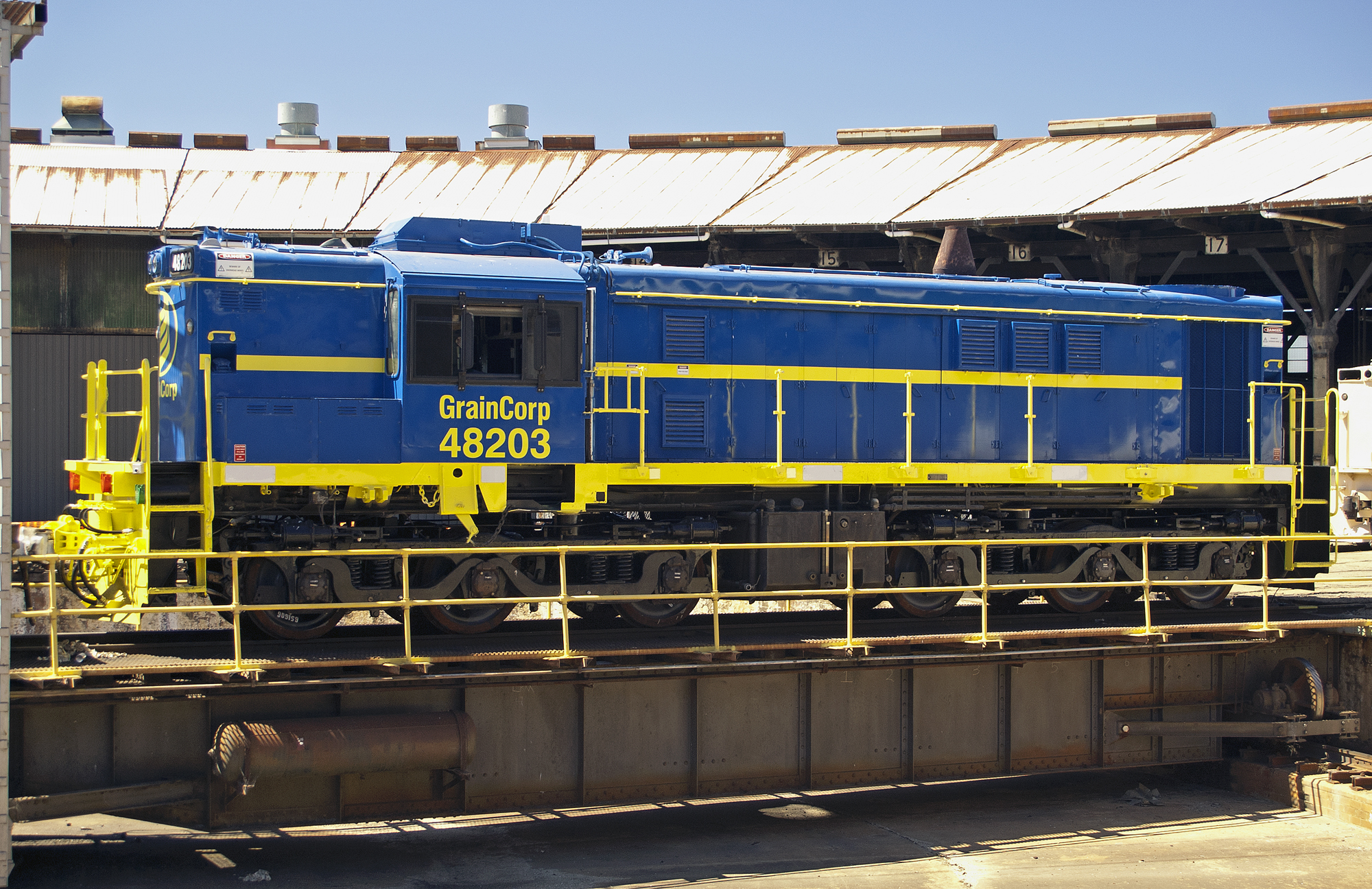
- GrainCorp's 48203 at Junee Locomotive Depot in March 2011
- Industry: Railway operator
- Headquarters: Junee
- Website: www.jrw.com.au

The Junee Railway Workshop is an accredited rail operator that maintains and repairs locomotives and rolling stock from its base at Junee Locomotive Depot.

== History ==
Junee Railway Workshop was formed in January 1995 as Austrac Ready Power. It purchased a number of former FreightCorp locomotives and leased the disused Junee Locomotive Depot. In June 1995, it completed the overhaul of two 442 class and one 45 class locomotives for lease to BHP, Port Kembla. It also signed a contract to rebuild engines for BHP.

In August 1997, Austrac became the first private operator to sign a track access agreement with the Rail Access Corporation. In November 1997, Austrac began operating a service from Griffith and Junee to Port Botany using 48 class locomotives. Austrac adopted a livery that was a reverse of that of the US Erie Lackawanna Railway.

In February 1998, NB1872 and NB1873 were purchased from Westrail. From August 1998, the Griffith services ceased with Austrac commencing a Sydney to Melbourne service as a joint venture with V/Line Freight. This ceased in May 1999 following V/Line Freight being sold to Freight Victoria however by then, Austrac was operating log train services from Junee and Tuggeranong, grain services from Quandialla as well as metropolitan trip workings in Sydney.

In late 1999, Austrac recommenced a three times a week Sydney to Melbourne service with four leased Chicago Freight Car Leasing Australia EL class locomotives and from December 1999 containerised grain services from Willow Tree were operated.

In July 2000, Austrac commenced a weekly Moree to Melbourne service replacing the service from Sydney.

On 21 August 2000, the three Austrac operational arms went into voluntary administration. It ceased trading in August 2001. The Australian Traction Corporation Pty Ltd changed its name to Junee Railway Workshop Pty Ltd in 2004. retaining the Junee depot lease and 48 class locomotives.

Since April 2010, Junee Railway Workshop has been overhauling a fleet of eighteen 48 class locomotives for GrainCorp along with an ex South Australian Railways 830 class for its own use. The ex Austrac 48s have been hired to other operators including El Zorro.\
