= New South Wales 48 class locomotive =

Class of diesel locomotives

NSW 48 class
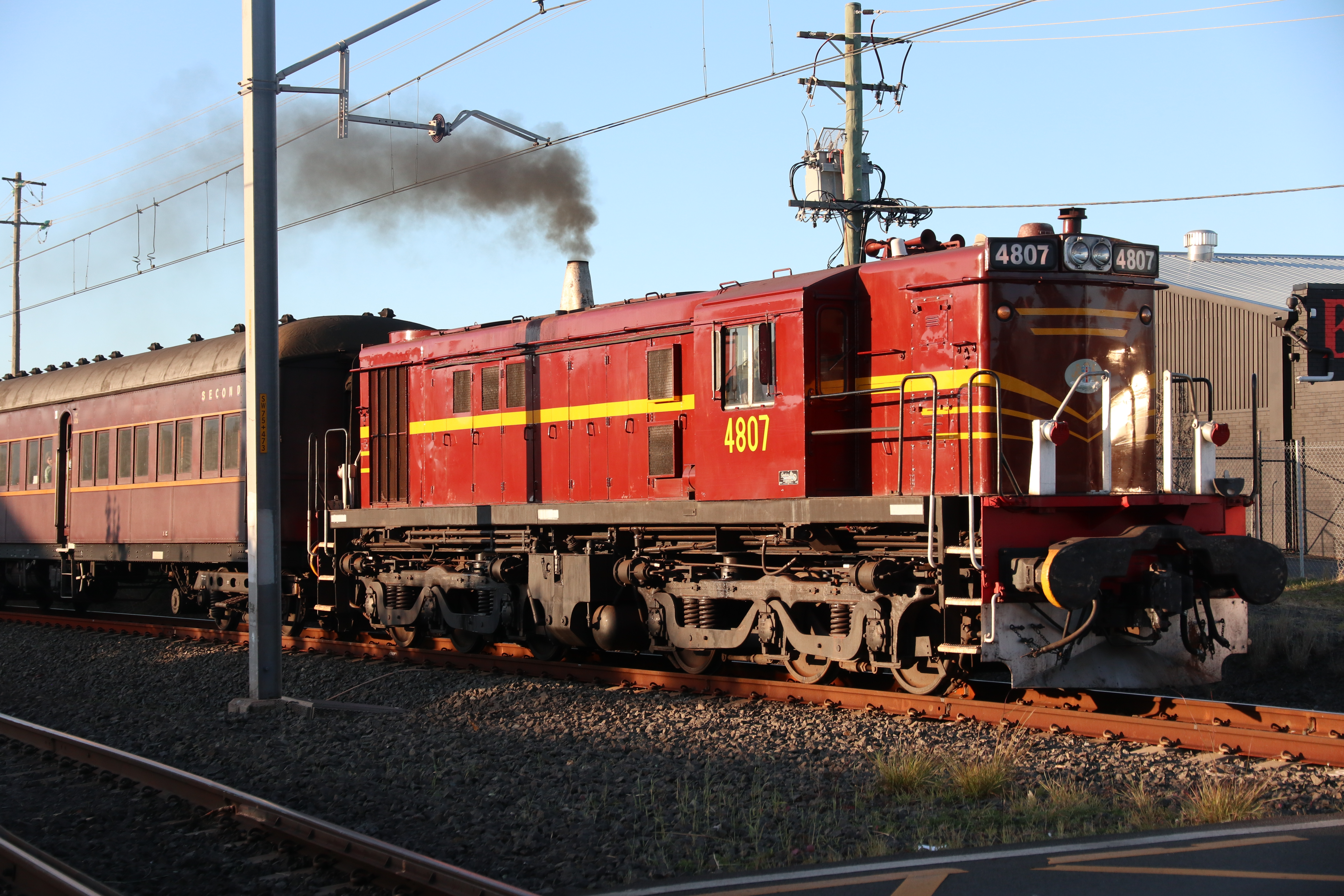
- Transport Heritage NSW's 4807 leading The Picnic Train on a shuttle to Wollongong in June 2022
Type and origin
- Power type: Diesel-electric
- Builder: AE Goodwin, Auburn
- Serial number: Alco 83701–83720, 83816–83825, 84121–84135; Alco G-3387-01 to G3387-40; Alco G-3420-01 to G-3420-40; Alco G-6013-01 to G-6013-40
- Model: Alco DL531
- Build date: 1959–1970
- Total produced: 165
Specifications
- Configuration
  - UIC: Co-Co
- Gauge: 4 ft 8 1/2 in (1,435 mm) standard gauge
- Wheel diameter: 40 in (1,016 mm)
- Length: Over headstocks: 44 ft 3 in (13.49 m), Over coupler pulling faces: 48 ft 5 in (14.76 m)
- Width: 9 ft 9 in (2.97 m)
- Height: 14 ft 0 in (4.27 m)
- Axle load: 4801–4885: 12 long tons 6 cwt (27,600 lb or 12.5 t); 4886–48165: 12 long tons 16 cwt (28,700 lb or 13 t)
- Loco weight: 4801–4885: 74 long tons 0 cwt (165,800 lb or 75.2 t); 4886–48165: 76 long tons 12 cwt (171,600 lb or 77.8 t)
- Fuel type: Diesel
- Fuel capacity: 4801–4885: 500 imp gal (2,300 L; 600 US gal); 4886–48165: 700 imp gal (3,200 L; 840 US gal)
- Lubricant cap.: 116 imp gal (530 L; 139 US gal)
- Coolant cap.: 90 imp gal (410 L; 110 US gal)
- Sandbox cap.: 10 cu ft (0.28 m^{3})
- Prime mover: Alco 6-251B
- RPM range: 375–1025
- Engine type: Four-stroke Inline diesel
- Aspiration: Turbocharged
- Generator: 4801–4845: General Electric 5GT 584; 4846–48165: Associated Electrical Industries TG 3602
- Traction motors: 4801–4885: General Electric 761; 4886–48165: Associated Electrical Industries 253 CT
- Cylinders: 6
- Cylinder size: 9 in × 10.5 in (229 mm × 267 mm)
Performance figures
- Maximum speed: 75 mph (121 km/h) (Design speed); 100 km/h (62 mph) (TfNSW limit)
- Power output: Gross: 1,050 hp (780 kW), For traction: 950 hp (710 kW)
- Tractive effort: Continuous: 4801–4885: 40,200 lbf (178.82 kN) at 8 mph (13 km/h); 4886–48165: 42,500 lbf (189.05 kN) at 6.5 mph (10 km/h)
Career
- Operators: NSW Department of Railways
- Number in class: 165
- Numbers: 4801–48165
- Delivered: 1959
- First run: September 1959
- Preserved: 4803, 4807, 4821, 4822, 4833, 4872
- Current owner: Graincorp, Greentrains, Junee Railway Workshop, Pacific National, RailCorp, Southern Shorthaul Railroad
- Disposition: 97 Scrapped, 53 Operational, 11 Stored, 6 Preserved, 1 Under Overhaul

The 48 Class is a class of diesel locomotives built by AE Goodwin, Auburn for the New South Wales Department of Railways between 1959 and 1970. Once the most ubiquitous locomotive in New South Wales, Australia, it is based on Alco frames and prime movers, using General Electric (later Associated Electrical Industries) electrical equipment. The South Australian Railways 830 and Silverton Rail 48s classes are of a very similar design.

== History ==
The 48 Class were ordered to commence the conversion of branch lines to diesel traction with the first entering service in September 1959. Further orders saw 165 in service by October 1970. There were four versions:

- Mark 1: 4801 – 4845
- Mark 2: 4846 – 4885
- Mark 3: 4886 – 48125
- Mark 4: 48126 – 48165

The Mark 1s and Mark 2s can be distinguished from the others by their fuel tank, which incorporates the brake reservoir tanks on either side.

As well as branch lines, they operated both main line and metropolitan services on every line in the state. Aside from a couple written off after accidents in the mid-1980s, withdrawals did not commence in earnest until August 1994. In December 1994, the first Mark 1s were sold. By June 1997, FreightCorp's fleet was down to 120 units.

Others have been withdrawn since and as at January 2014, 66 remained in service primarily with Pacific National. GrainCorp, Greentrains, Junee Railway Workshop and Sydney Trains also operate some.

== By operator ==
=== Railway Services Authority/RailCorp ===
Two (4819 and 4827) were transferred by the State Rail Authority to the Railway Service Authority; these have since passed to RailCorp.

=== Silverton Rail/Greentrains ===
In December 1994, Silverton Rail purchased six from FreightCorp. All were placed in service as their Silverton Rail 48s class. All units passed into the ownership of Greentrains, however all operational units have been on-sold to Southern Shorthaul Railroad.

=== Australian National/One Rail Australia ===
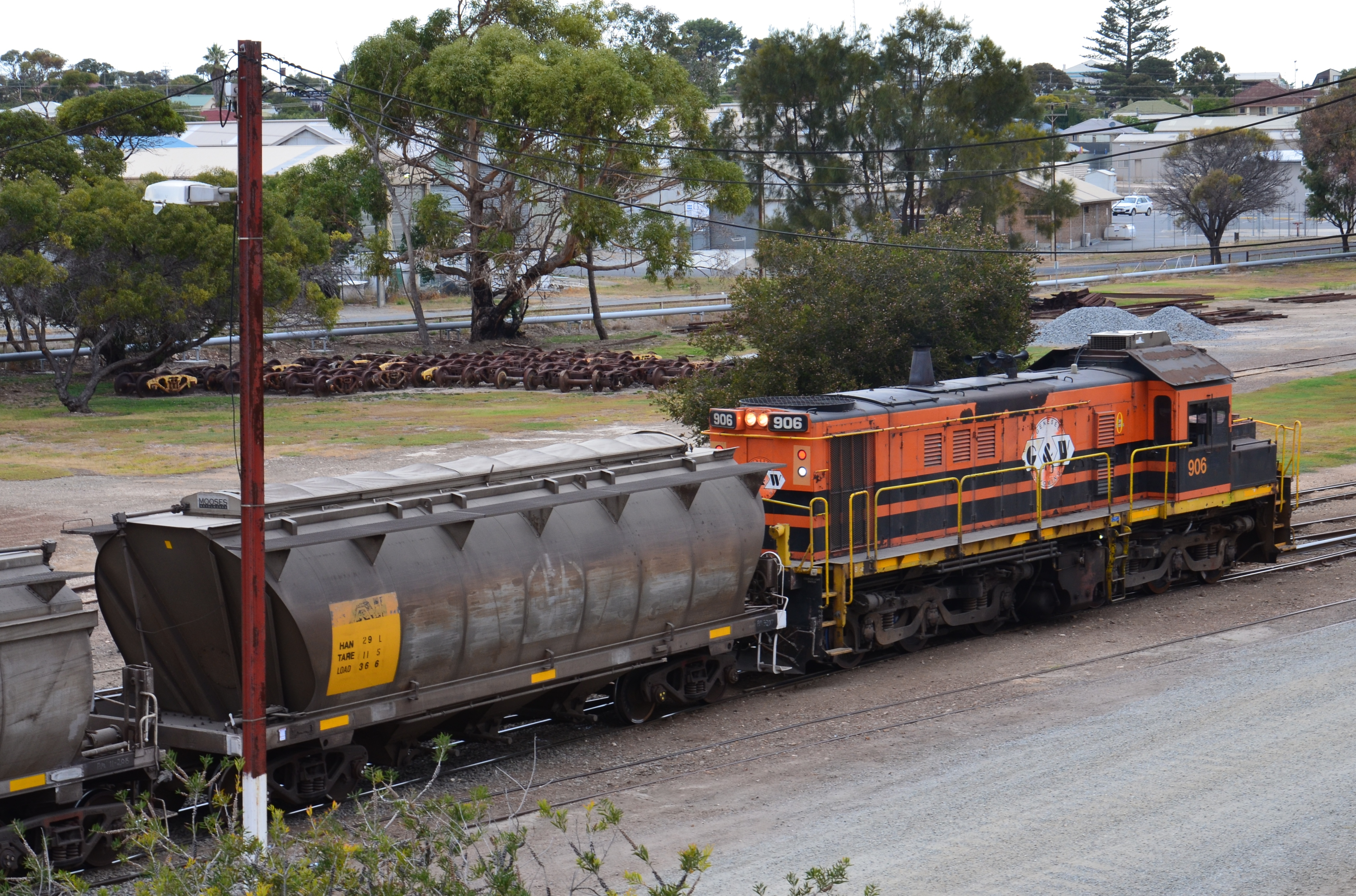
906 shunting at Port Lincoln, 2017

In December 1994, Australian National purchased two from FreightCorp with 4813 rebuilt as DA7 for the narrow gauge Eyre Peninsula Railway and 4826 scrapped some years later at Port Augusta. The locomotive saw service on the far western portion of the Eyre Peninsula Railway narrow gauge network with One Rail Australia working the Thevenard gypsum traffic, renumbered 906. Following the arrival of 2300 class units 2332D and 2364D from Queensland in April 2023, 906 has been withdrawn and stored at Thevenard.

=== Austrac Ready Power/Junee Railway Workshop ===
Austrac Ready Power purchased four (4814, 4816, 4820 & 4836) from a scrap dealer and placed three in service on their various services. 4820 never saw service with Austrac and is stored in partially rebuilt condition at Junee. Following Austrac ceasing all passed to Junee Railway Workshop. Currently 4814 and 4836 are operational, while 4816 has also been stored at Junee.

=== Cargill Australia ===
In February 1997, 4812 was rebuilt and repainted by FreightCorp at Delec Locomotive Depot for Cargill Australia for use as a shunter at their Kooragang Island plant numbered CAR1. It was sold to Junee Railway Workshop. It was scrapped in 2016.

=== GrainCorp ===
GrainCorp have purchased 18 Mark 3s and are having them overhauled by Junee Railway Workshop at which point they are renumbered into the 482xx series, they are numbered the following:

Status	Unit nos.
Operational	48201, 48208, 48211, 48215
Stored	48202, 48203, 48204, 48205, 48206, 48207, 48209, 48212, 48213, 48214, 48216, 48217, 48218, GPU1, GPU2

=== Pacific National ===
When Pacific National purchased FreightRail, they inherited some 48 class locomotives. They also operate the 482 class for GrainCorp.

As of 2023 they operated the following locomotives:

Status	Unit nos.
Operational	4894, 48123, 48138, 48144, 48153, 48159, 48162
Stored	48101, 48103, 48119, 48120, 48127, 48130, 48143, 48156, 48160, 48161, 48164, 48165
Scrapped	4806

=== Southern Shorthaul Railroad ===
In November 2022 Southern Shorthaul Railroad renumbered 48s33 back to its original number of 4829. In October 2023, they renumbered 48s35 back to its original number of 4843. 48s28, one of three mechanically-identical locomotives formerly owned by the Silverton Tramway and currently owned by SSR, was renumbered to 4828 – the original 4828 was scrapped in 2014. As of October 2024, 48s34 was renumbered to its original number of 4815.

== PL class ==
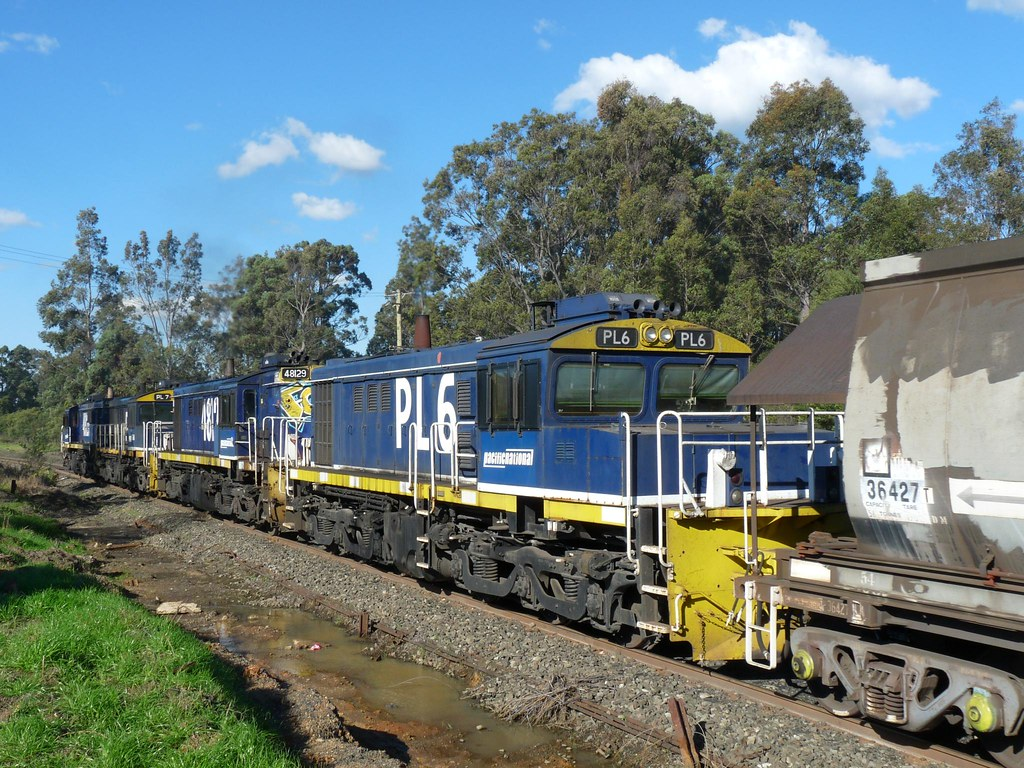
PL6 trailing on a coal train near Pelton

Seven Mark 2 locomotives were rebuilt by FreightCorp between 1999 and 2001 as the PL (for PortLink) class. Changes included the short end cab nose being lowered, the cab altered, and the installation of air-conditioning. They were designed to operate in push-pull formation on intermodal container trains between Port Botany and Clyde/Yennora.

PL1 and PL2 were transferred to South Australia after the sale of FreightCorp to Pacific National for use at Keswick Terminal shunting for Great Southern Rail which was prior a National Rail contract. PL2 was transferred back to NSW with PL1 remaining in South Australia. In NSW the class saw use on the former South Maitland Railway hauling coal along with 48 class locos. After a long period of storage at Kooragang Island, PL2, PL3, PL5, PL6 and PL7 were scrapped in 2013. PL4 was finally scrapped at Narrabri in late 2016 after being stored there for years. PL1 remains in service as a shunter at the Progress Rail workshops in Port Augusta.

== Preserved ==
As of December 2023, there are six preserved locomotives, four of them operational:

- 4803: Transport Heritage NSW, in the custody of NSW Rail Museum, Thirlmere, operational
- 4807: Transport Heritage NSW, in the custody of NSW Rail Museum, Thirlmere, operational
- 4821: Goulburn Rail Heritage Centre, operational
- 4822: Dorrigo Steam Railway & Museum, stored
- 4833: Transport Heritage NSW, in the custody of NSW Rail Museum, Thirlmere, operational
- 4872: Junee Roundhouse Railway Museum, static display
