= Silverton Tramway 48s class =

Alco model DL531 diesel-electric locomotive

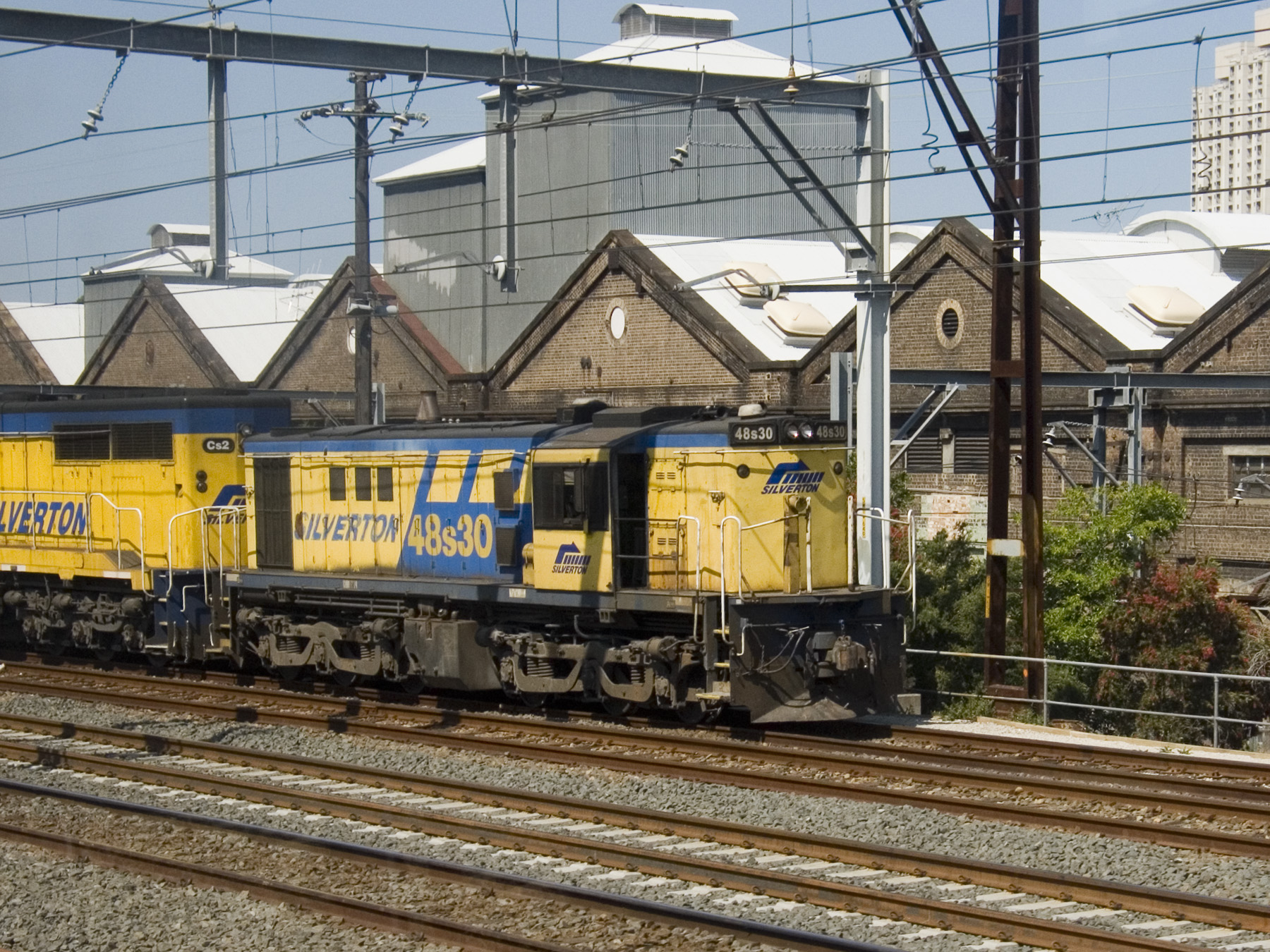
- Silverton 48s30, one of the second-hand locomotives, at Redfern.
Type and origin
- Power type: Diesel-electric
- Builder: AE Goodwin, Auburn
- Serial number: Alco 83826–83828
- Model: Alco DL531
- Build date: 1960–1961
- Total produced: 3
Specifications
- Configuration
  - UIC: Co-Co
- Gauge: 1,067 mm (3 ft 6 in), 1,435 mm (4 ft 8 1/2 in) standard gauge
- Wheel diameter: 40 in (1,016 mm)
- Length: Over headstocks: 44 ft 3 in (13.49 m); Over coupler pulling faces: 48 ft 5 in (14.76 m)
- Width: 9 ft 9 in (2,972 mm)
- Height: 14 ft 0 in (4,267 mm)
- Axle load: 12 long tons 6 cwt (27,600 lb or 12.5 t)
- Loco weight: 74 long tons 0 cwt (165,800 lb or 75.2 t)
- Fuel type: Diesel
- Fuel capacity: 500 imp gal (2,300 L; 600 US gal)
- Lubricant cap.: 116 imp gal (530 L; 139 US gal)
- Coolant cap.: 90 imp gal (410 L; 110 US gal)
- Sandbox cap.: 10 cu ft (0.28 m^{3})
- Prime mover: Alco 6-251B
- RPM range: 375–1025
- Engine type: Four-stroke inline 6 diesel
- Aspiration: Turbocharged
- Generator: General Electric 5GT 584
- Traction motors: General Electric 761
- Cylinders: 6
- Cylinder size: 9 in × 10.5 in (229 mm × 267 mm)
Performance figures
- Maximum speed: 75 mph (121 km/h)
- Power output: Gross: 1,050 hp (780 kW); For traction: 950 hp (710 kW)
- Tractive effort: Continuous: 40,200 lbf (178.82 kN) at 8 mph (13 km/h)
Career
- Operators: Silverton Tramway Company
- Number in class: 3
- Numbers: 27–29
- First run: December 1960
- Current owner: Genesee & Wyoming Australia; Southern Shorthaul Railroad
- Disposition: 2 in service, 1 scrapped

The Silverton Tramway 48s class are a class of diesel locomotives built by AE Goodwin, Auburn for the Silverton Tramway in 1960–1961. The State Rail Authority 48 class and South Australian Railways 830 class are of a very similar design.

== History ==
Between December 1960 and September 1961, the Silverton Tramway Company took delivery of three Alco DL531 locomotives from AE Goodwin, Auburn, painted in a red and white livery and numbered 27 to 29. They were the same as the 48 class and 830 class locomotives. All were delivered for use on the 56 kilometre Silverton Tramway narrow gauge line from Broken Hill to Cockburn.

After the Silverton Tramway was replaced by a new standard gauge line, 27 was sold to the South Australian Railways in February 1970 as 874 and after being rebuilt with a nose low cab, continues in service with Genesee & Wyoming Australia as 907. The other two were fitted with standard gauge bogies, 28 at Silverton's workshop and 29 at Islington Railway Workshops and were relegated to trip working between the various mines in Broken Hill being repainted in Silverton's yellow and blue livery in May 1984.

== Second hand purchases ==
In 1990, Silverton Rail purchased two ex-Australian National 830 class from AN Tasrail followed in December 1994 by six ex-State Rail Authority 48 class locomotives. Initially numbered in the STxx series, all were renumbered as the 48s class. Also purchased for parts were two 830s and three 48s.

== Mainline service ==
In 1995/96, Silverton Rail leased ST30 to ST35 to National Rail for use on Adelaide to Melbourne services as bankers to Tailem Bend. Following Silverton Rail being awarded a contract by National Rail to haul iron ore trains from Cobar to Narromine, most of the STs were transferred to Parkes in August 1999.

All ten were included in the sale of Silverton Rail to South Spur Rail Services in 2006 and later passed to Greentrains. They primarily operate in New South Wales. In April 2016, five Greentrains units were sold to Southern Shorthaul Railroad.

== Status table ==
=== Purchased new ===
Current No	Serial number	Date	Owner	Status	Notes
907	83826	Dec 1960	Genesee & Wyoming Australia	In service	ex-Silverton 27, sold to South Australian Railways as 874, rebuilt as 907
4828	83827	May 1961	Southern Shorthaul Railroad	In service	ex-28, ex-48s28, renumbered to 4828 in early 2024. Currently the only one of the original batch still operating in original condition. Note that the original 4828, a member of the NSWGR 48 class, had been scrapped in 2014.
48s29	83828	Sep 1961	Greentrains	Scrapped	ex-29

=== Purchased second hand ===
Current No	Serial number	Date	Owner	Status	Notes
864	84710	Jul 1963	Greentrains	In service	ex-48s30, ex AN Tasrail 864
48s31	84703	Apr 1963	Greentrains	Scrapped	ex-AN Tasrail 857
48s32	83820	Feb 1961	Greentrains	Scrapped	ex-State Rail Authority 4825
4829	83824	May 1961	Southern Shorthaul Railroad	In service	ex-Silverton 48s33
4815	83715	Feb 1960	Southern Shorthaul Railroad	In service	ex-Silverton 48s34
4843	84133	Feb 1962	Southern Shorthaul Railroad	In service	ex-Silverton 48s35
4811	83711	Dec 1959	Southern Shorthaul Railroad	Stored	ex-Silverton 48s36
48s37	84128	Dec 1961	Greentrains	Scrapped	ex-State Rail Authority 4838
