= Thévenard =

Thévenard is a French surname. Notable people with the surname include:

- André Thévenard (1898–1952), French physician, known for Thevenard syndrome
- Antoine-Jean-Marie Thévenard (1733–1815), French politician and vice admiral
- Antoine-René Thévenard (1766–1798), French Navy officer
- Gabriel-Vincent Thévenard (1669–1741), French opera singer
- Patrice Thévenard (born 1954), French cyclist

== See also ==
- Thevenard, South Australia
- Thevenard syndrome
