= GrainCorp =

Australian public company

GrainCorp Limited
- Formerly: Grain Elevators Board; Government Grain Elevator
- Type: Public
- Traded as: ASX: GNC
- Industry: Agriculture
- Founded: 1917; 109 years ago
- Founder: Government of New South Wales
- Headquarters: Tower 2, International Towers, Barangaroo, Sydney NSW 2000
- Key people: Peter Richards (Chairman); Robert Spurway (Managing Director and CEO)
- Services: Grain storage, handling and marketing
- Revenue: $4.9 billion (2019)
- Website: www.graincorp.com.au

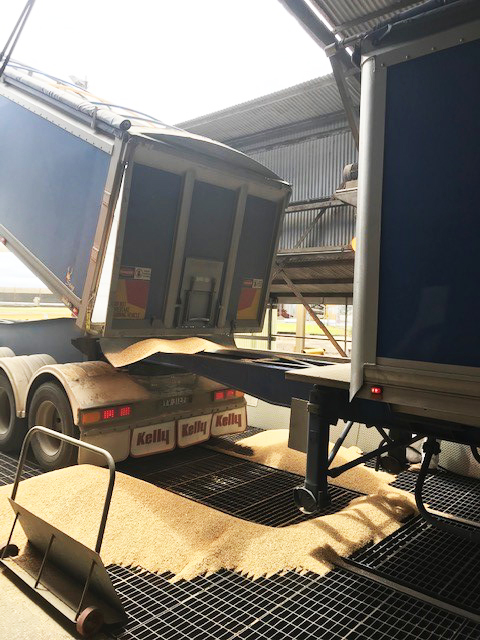
A truck unloads grain at the GrainCorp site in Portland, Victoria

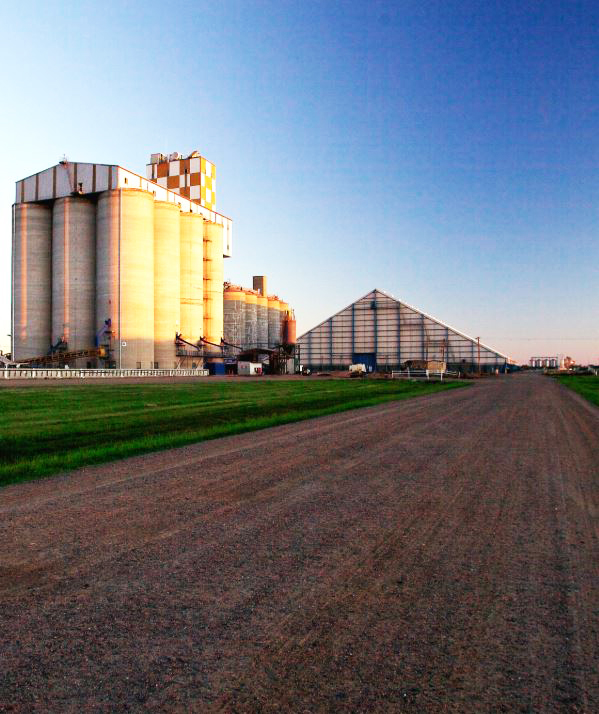
GrainCorp site on Industrial Dve, Moree, NSW

GrainCorp Limited is an Australian agribusiness and food-ingredients processing company listed on the Australian Securities Exchange. The company's core business is the receiving and storage of grain and related commodities. It also provides logistics and markets these commodities.

The company was founded by the Government of New South Wales as a public sector agency, Government Grain Elevator (later the Grain Elevators Board), in 1917. It was formed to transport grain from local collection points located on railways throughout the grain-producing regions of New South Wales. It was later known as the Grain Handling Authority. It was privatised in 1992 with a majority of shares being transferred to grain growers, and listed on the Australian Securities Exchange in March 1998.

GrainCorp's operations have subsequently extended into other Australian states by amalgamations with other grain handling operations. In July 2000 it merged with its Victorian equivalent, Vicgrain. The company operates an extensive network of rail-linked storages across south-east Australia, as well as seven export terminals in Brisbane, Geelong, Gladstone, Mackay, Newcastle, Port Kembla and Portland.

In November 2009 GrainCorp expanded into North America through the purchase of the United Malt Holdings group of companies. In July 2011, GrainCorp agreed to buy maltster GermanMalt GmbH & Co, extending its reach into Europe.

Having purchased a 20% stake in the company, in 2013 Archer Daniels Midland launched a take over offer. Although cleared by the Australian Competition & Consumer Commission, the bid was disallowed by Federal Treasurer Joe Hockey, citing that it would not be in Australia's national interest.

In May 2009, eighteen 48 class locomotives and 180 grain wagons were transferred by the Government of New South Wales at no cost. They continued to be operated by Pacific National. In Queensland, services are contracted out to Watco Australia.

In 2015 GrainCorp formed a strategic joint venture with major Japanese agricultural cooperative, Zen-Noh Grain Corporation, to create GrainsConnect Canada – a highly-efficient grain supply chain that is connecting the growers of Western Canada to the world.

== Demerger of United Malt Group ==
In early 2020, GrainCorp announced that the demerger of its malt business and created the United Malt Group. The new company was also listed on the ASX on the 2nd of April 2020.

== Controversies ==
In October 2019 GrainCorp was found guilty by the New South Wales Environment Protection Authority of breaches of fumigation protocol at its Port Kembla facility. The breaches were self-reported in February 2018 and GrainCorp was fined $40,200.
