= Greensill scandal =

British political lobbying scandal

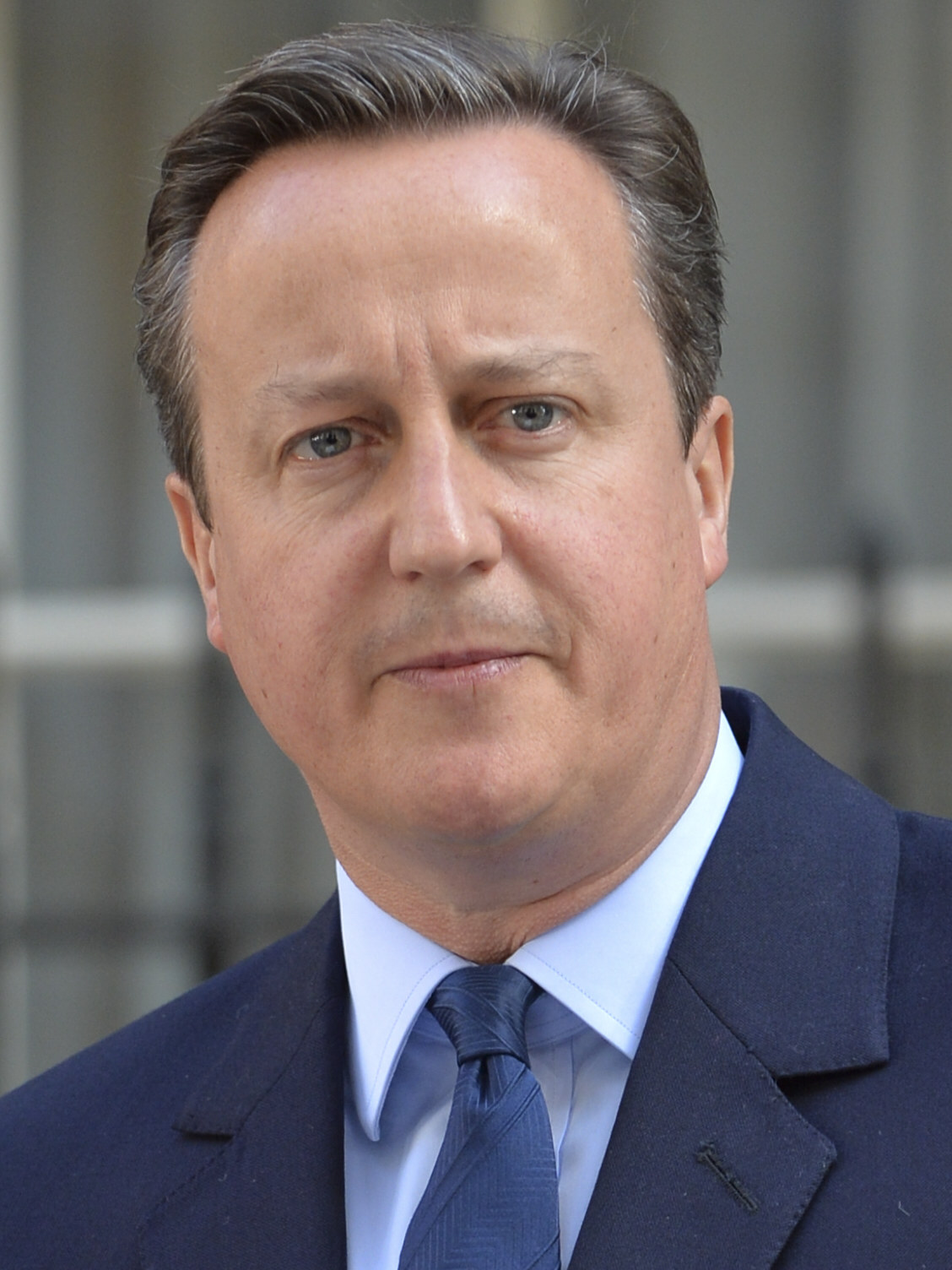
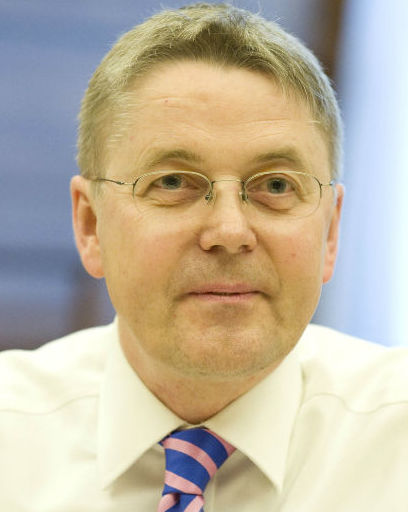
Former Prime Minister David Cameron (left) and former Cabinet Secretary Jeremy Heywood (right) were both implicated in the scandal.

The Greensill scandal was a political controversy in the United Kingdom related to lobbying activities on behalf of financial services company Greensill Capital which was founded in 2011 by Lex Greensill. It implicated former Prime Minister David Cameron, former Cabinet Secretary Jeremy Heywood and several other civil servants, and occurred during the COVID-19 pandemic.

First reported by the Financial Times and The Sunday Times, it arose from the insolvency of the supply chain financing firm Greensill Capital in March 2021, first reported by The Wall Street Journal. Reports emerged that Cameron had lobbied Chancellor of the Exchequer Rishi Sunak in 2020 to change rules in order to allow Greensill to join the Covid Corporate Financing Facility, a government loan scheme that was initiated to support companies during the pandemic-related economic recession.

A Cabinet Office inquiry found Lord Heywood to be primarily responsible for Lex Greensill being given a role in government and access into 10 Downing Street. That inquiry and two other separate official inquiries found that Cameron had not broken any lobbying rules or acted unlawfully in relation to his Greensill lobbying activities, although a Treasury committee report said in finding he did not break lobbying rules “that reflects on the insufficient strength of the rules”.

== Background ==
During Cameron's 2010–2016 premiership, financier Lex Greensill, suggested by the image of a business card published by the Labour Party to be a senior advisor to the Prime Minister, was alleged by The Sunday Times to have had access to eleven departments and agencies. In 2018, Cameron became an adviser to Greensill Capital and held shares in the company. It has been reported that he may have made $60 million from a listing of the company, as well as it being reported that "people familiar with the matter" said he was being paid over $1 million a year for 25 days work per year.

Documents obtained by the BBC's Panorama suggested that Cameron earned around £7m from his salary and selling shares. In 2019, Cameron arranged for a private meeting with Lex Greensill and Secretary of State for Health and Social Care Matt Hancock. Some NHS trusts went on to use Greensill Capital's services.

== Lobbying ==
=== David Cameron ===
In 2020, several months before Greensill Capital collapsed, Cameron lobbied the government to change the rules to allow it to join the Covid Corporate Financing Facility scheme, which would enable it to issue government guaranteed loans to support firms during the COVID-19 pandemic in the United Kingdom, which had had a major economic impact. Cameron lobbied the Chancellor of the Exchequer Rishi Sunak via a series of text messages. There was also at least one phone call between the two, the nature of which was not disclosed. Cameron's requests on behalf of Greensill were declined.

Cameron also lobbied an official of the German government on behalf of Greensill. In November 2020, he participated in a virtual call with the German ambassador alongside senior representatives from Greensill to discuss introducing its products into the German civil service.

According to Cameron, his lobbying on Greensill's behalf did not break any rule of conduct.

=== Greensill ===
Between March and June 2020, Greensill held ten virtual meetings with permanent secretaries Tom Scholar and Charles Roxburgh.

=== Civil servants ===
The investigations highlighted that Greensill not only had lobbying links with David Cameron, but with some senior civil servants and private companies too.

Bill Crothers served as the UK Government's Chief Commercial Officer from 2012 to 2015, receiving a salary of up to £149,000 a year. According to The Times, in that role, "he was closely involved in bringing Lex Greensill into the heart of government as a crown representative, a role that gave him access to government procurement strategy". He became an advisor to Greensill while still a civil servant, before becoming a director of the company in August 2016. He did not declare his association to the civil service ethics watchdog, nor did he obtain permission from the Advisory Committee on Business Appointments (ACOBA) to take up his post-civil service job: ACOBA vets all private sector appointments of former senior civil servants and government ministers.

== Inquiries ==
=== UK lobbying registrar ===
By 25 March 2021, a formal investigation had been launched by the UK lobbying registrar to investigate whether David Cameron's work for Greensill had breached lobbying laws. The investigation cleared Cameron of any wrongdoing, concluding that his "activities had not fallen within the criteria that required registration".

=== Cabinet Office ===
On 12 April 2021 the government announced a Cabinet Office inquiry into the lobbying activity performed on behalf of Greensill, to be led by specialist finance solicitor Nigel Boardman, a non-executive board member of the Department for Business, Energy and Industrial Strategy. The Cabinet Office inquiry published its 141-page report on 21 July 2021. In it, the former Cabinet Secretary Jeremy Heywood was criticised. Heywood was found to be primarily responsible for Lex Greensill being given a role in government and "extraordinarily privileged" access into 10 Downing Street. It also concluded that Cameron "did not breach the current lobbying rules and his actions were not unlawful" and that he "on occasion understated the nature of his relationship with Greensill Capital".

=== House of Commons Treasury Committee ===
On 14 April 2021 the House of Commons Treasury Committee announced they would be holding an inquiry. On 20 July 2021, they published the report of their inquiry into lessons learnt from the failure of Greensill Capital. The inquiry found that Cameron had not broken the rules related to lobbying by former ministers. The report also said that the current rules had "insufficient strength", and that there was a "good case for strengthening them" and that in his lobbying of Greensill, Cameron had shown a "significant lack of judgement".

=== Financial Reporting Council ===
On 28 June 2021, the Financial Reporting Council announced that it had opened an investigation into the audit of Greensill Capital (UK) Limited by Saffery Champness LLP. The investigation is ongoing as of July 2023. The Financial Times reported that larger audit firms had refused to act for Greensill due to reputational concerns, after it had sought to appoint a larger audit firm due to Saffery Champness' limited experience in auditing such companies.

=== Serious Fraud Office ===
In January 2024, The Guardian reported that David Cameron's activities at Greensill Capital were a "matter of interest" in a Serious Fraud Office investigation. The SFO had questioned witnesses about Cameron's involvement with Greensill as part of a wider inquiry into "suspected fraud, fraudulent trading and money laundering" in GFG Alliance companies.

=== German criminal charges ===
In December 2025, German prosecutors brought criminal charges against three unnamed people involved in running Greensill Bank in 2021; they are alleged to have avoided banking regulations.

=== Reform implications ===
The scandal drew attention to several parts of the Westminster lobbying and post-government employment framework. The existing statutory lobbying regime did not require Cameron to register his lobbying for Greensill, because his activities did not fall within the criteria for consultant lobbying. The case also raised questions about the advisory status of the Advisory Committee on Business Appointments and the limited enforceability of rules governing former ministers, senior officials and post-government employment.

The institutional response was extensive but did not lead to a new statute. The Boardman review recommended stronger transparency reporting, clearer rules on secondary employment, legally binding post-employment restrictions for ministers and civil servants, and closer working arrangements between government and ACOBA. The House of Commons Treasury Committee also concluded that Cameron had not broken the existing lobbying rules, but that this reflected the insufficient strength of those rules and that there was a good case for strengthening them.

The affair has therefore been treated as a case in which sustained scrutiny and multiple committee or official reviews produced a limited institutional response rather than primary legislation. In this respect, it differed from earlier Westminster financial-integrity scandals such as the 2009 parliamentary expenses scandal and the 2013 lobbying scandal, both of which were followed by statutory reform.
