= Cultana Solar Farm =

Proposed solar farm in Australia

cultana Solar Farm
- Country: Australia
- Coordinates: 32°54′S 137°36′E
- Status: Proposed
- Construction cost: 350 million A$ (2019)
- Owner: SIMEC Group

Solar farm
- Type: Standard PV
- Solar tracker: Single-axis
- Site area: 1,000 ha (2,500 acres)

Power generation
- Nameplate capacity: 280 MW

External links
- Website: www.simecenergy.com.au/en-au/projects/cultana-solar-farm/

Cultana Solar Farm is a proposed solar farm to be constructed north of Whyalla by SIMEC Energy Australia (part of the GFG Alliance). Construction is expected to begin early in 2020 after development approval was granted in May 2019.

The contract for engineering, procurement and construction (EPC) was let to Shanghai Electric in June 2019 with construction expected to take 12 to 15 months to complete. The site is north of Whyalla, on both sides of the Lincoln Highway. It was to consist of a total of 925,000 solar modules (later changed to 780,000), each 1 x 2 metres and 35 mm thick, mounted in groups of 85 modules in a north–south orientation on single-axis trackers. Each tracker will be 90 metres long, with 3 metre access between them, and a maximum height of four metres. The total area across the two sites is about 1,000 hectares (2,500 acres). The southern site will generate 70 MW at 33 kV and be connected via overhead cables to the northern site which will generate 210 MW and have a 33 kV/275 kV substation connected to ElectraNet's Cultana substation.

The solar farm will be connected to the National Electricity Market but its primary customer will be the Whyalla Steelworks which is also owned and operated by members of the GFG Alliance.

Cultana Solar Farm will be Shanghai Electric's first project in Australia, and is expected to be Australia's largest solar farm at the time of its completion, with a capacity of 280 MW.

A test array of almost 200 panels was installed in late 2019 to provide more detailed information in advance of the main construction phase. The saltbush onsite is rolled rather than graded, reducing dust and increasing power output, expected at 600 GWh from the 780,000 solar panels by 2022.
