= Liberty Steel Group =

British industrial and metals company

Liberty Steel Group Holdings UK Ltd
- Founded: 1992; 34 years ago
- Founder: Sanjeev Gupta
- Headquarters: London, England
- Products: Steel; Aluminium; Scrap metal Engineering
- Website: www.libertysteelgroup.com

Liberty Steel Group Holdings UK Ltd (LSG), which is also referred to as Liberty House or Liberty House UK, is a British industrial and metals company founded in the United Kingdom in 1992 by industrialist Sanjeev Gupta. It is headquartered in London, England, and has offices in Dubai, Singapore, and Hong Kong. The company is a subsidiary of Gupta's GFG Alliance. The holding company of Liberty Steel, Liberty House Group PTE Ltd is based in Singapore.

== History ==
Liberty House was founded by Sanjeev Gupta in 1992, when he was a student at Cambridge University. Living on campus at Trinity College, he registered his company at the college. When this was discovered, he was asked to leave the residence.

In 2013, Liberty House Group (LHG) was a surprise buyer for a steel mill in Newport, South Wales, Mir Steel UK, that had got into financial difficulties. Companies owned by Gupta and his family went on to make further acquisitions in the UK. Together with the SIMEC Group, part of the GFG Alliance, Liberty purchased the Lochaber aluminium smelter plant as well as the Laggan Dam from Rio Tinto in November 2016. In February 2017, LHG agreed to purchase the specialty steel division of Tata Steel Europe for £100 million. The purchase included the division's facilities in Rotherham, Stocksbridge, and Brinsworth in South Yorkshire and Wednesbury in the West Midlands.

In July 2017, LHG purchased Australian steelmaker and iron ore miner Arrium, which owned Whyalla Steelworks in the town of Whyalla, South Australia, but had entered voluntary administration in April 2016. The steelworks had 3,000 employees, who had taken a 10% pay cut in order to make the sale more acceptable. Gupta paid A$700 million for this purchase. The company was rebadged LibertyOneSteel for the first year of ownership, later being renamed Liberty Steel.

In October 2019, GFG Alliance promised to merge its steel assets into Liberty Steel Group by year end.

In 2020, LHG received European Union approval to purchase the plant of aluminium smelter operator Aleris in Duffel, Belgium, which cleared the way for the purchase of Aleris by Novelis.

On 4 January 2021, GFG Alliance completed the purchase of manganese smelter TEMCO in Bell Bay, Tasmania from South32 and Anglo American.

On 19 February 2021 ThyssenKrupp ended discussions with Liberty Steel, which had proposed to take over the former's steel unit. ThyssenKrupp had sought €1.5 billion for its steel assets but, given ThyssenKrupp's €960 million EBIT loss in 2020, Liberty had sought to acquire the unit for a reverse payment.

On 31 March 2021 Credit Suisse filed insolvency proceedings against Liberty Commodities (a LHG subsidiary) in a London court. The action was brought by a unit of another bank, Citigroup, which was acting under instruction from Credit Suisse. Credit Suisse were on the hook for a $10 billion fund, part of which was invested in Greensill Capital (owned by Australian businessman Lex Greensill), which had placed $3.6 billion in LHG parent company GFG, part of which had funnelled down to LCL. The balance sheet of Credit Suisse would absorb significant damage as a result.

On 2 April 2021, Gupta claimed that none of its plants would close under his watch, as he tried to refinance his business after the collapse of financial backer Greensill. Liberty Steel had 3,000 employees, while GFG Alliance had another 2,000 in other UK metals and engineering businesses. In April 2021, Secretary of State for Business, Energy and Industrial Strategy Kwasi Kwarteng rejected a request to bail LSG out. Gupta moved cash between his operations in different countries to keep his business empire afloat. In February 2022, HM Revenue & Customs sought winding-up petitions against four LSG subsidiaries.

In November 2024, Liberty Steel initiated a restructuring plan for its UK-based Speciality Steel division (SSUK) in a bid to reduce its significant debt load. Despite potential impacts on creditors, it was reported that the plan would not affect the 1,500 employees of SSUK.

On 19 February 2025, the South Australian Government announced that it had forced the Whyalla Steelworks into administration, after many months uncertainty for workers, with unpaid debts totalling more than A$300 million, which included royalty payments to government as well debts to as other creditors. On 20 February, the federal government under Anthony Albanese announced a $2.4 billion joint state-federal support package for Whyalla and its steelworks, which includes immediate, short-term, and long-term spending plans. SA Premier Peter Malinauskas said that it was not a bailout for GFG, and that Gupta would have to pay the company's debt to the state, after they had paid the creditors and got the steelworks rolling again.

As of February 2025, Gupta's companies are under investigation by the Serious Fraud Office in the UK, since the collapse of Greensill. SFO "is investigating suspected fraud, fraudulent trading and money laundering in relation to the financing and conduct of the business of companies within the Gupta Family Group (GFG) Alliance, including its financing arrangements with Greensill Capital UK Ltd". Gupta remains in Dubai.

In March 2026 Liberty Bell Bay manganese smelter in Tasmania was placed in voluntary administration. This was the last business owned by Gupta left in Australia. After the administrators were unable to find a buyer, the smelter's closure was announced on 16 July 2026, putting around 200 employees out of work.

== Description ==
Liberty Steel is headquartered in London, and has offices in Dubai, Singapore, and Hong Kong. The holding company of Liberty Steel, Liberty House Group PTE Ltd, is based in Singapore.

The company's business is focused on ferrous and non-ferrous metal trading, metals recycling, steel and aluminium production, and engineering products and services.

== Sponsorships ==
Liberty Steel is a sponsor of Port Adelaide Football Club, an Australian rules football club in the Australian Football League.
