= Whyalla Steelworks =

Australian steel company

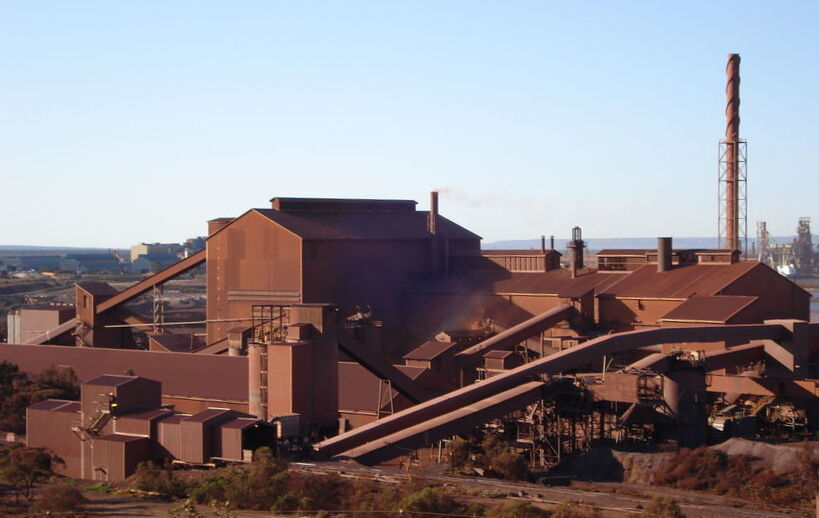
The Whyalla Steelworks c. 2009

The Whyalla Steelworks is a fully integrated steelworks and the only manufacturer of rail in Australia. It produces 75% of all structural steel in Australia. Iron ore is mined in the Middleback Range to feed the steelworks, resulting in the distribution of finished steel products of over 90 different grades. It occupies a 1,000-hectare (2,500-acre) site on the shore of False Bay, Spencer Gulf and is the largest employer in Whyalla, South Australia.

Opened in 1941, along with a major shipyard, the steelworks were owned by BHP, and many of the vessels were produced for the use of BHP Shipping. The shipyards were closed in 1978. OneSteel, later Arrium was a company spun out from BHP in 2000, and owned the steelworks until the company went into administration in 2017. It was bought by Liberty House Group, a subsidiary of the British company GFG Alliance, owned by Sanjeev Gupta, and the OneSteel brand was changed to Liberty OneSteel. After the company had incurred massive debts, the South Australian Government forced it into administration in February 2025, and the federal government announced a $2.4 billion joint state-federal support package for Whyalla and its steelworks.

== History ==
=== Iron ore mining ===
The Whyalla Steelworks receives iron ore mined at various sites along the Middleback Range. Iron ore mining in this region dates back to at least 1900. Prior to the steelworks' construction, the ore was shipped from Whyalla (then known as Hummock Hill) to Port Pirie for use as a flux in smelters. It was later supplied to steel-making facilities at Port Kembla, New South Wales. The first shipment of iron ore by sea for Port Pirie departed Whyalla in 1903. The first mines to be developed were Iron Knob and Iron Monarch, with later developments including Iron Baron, Iron Knight, Iron Princess, Iron Chieftain and Iron Duke. The mines were developed by BHP, which went on to develop the steelworks and shipyards.

=== Steelworks and shipyards ===
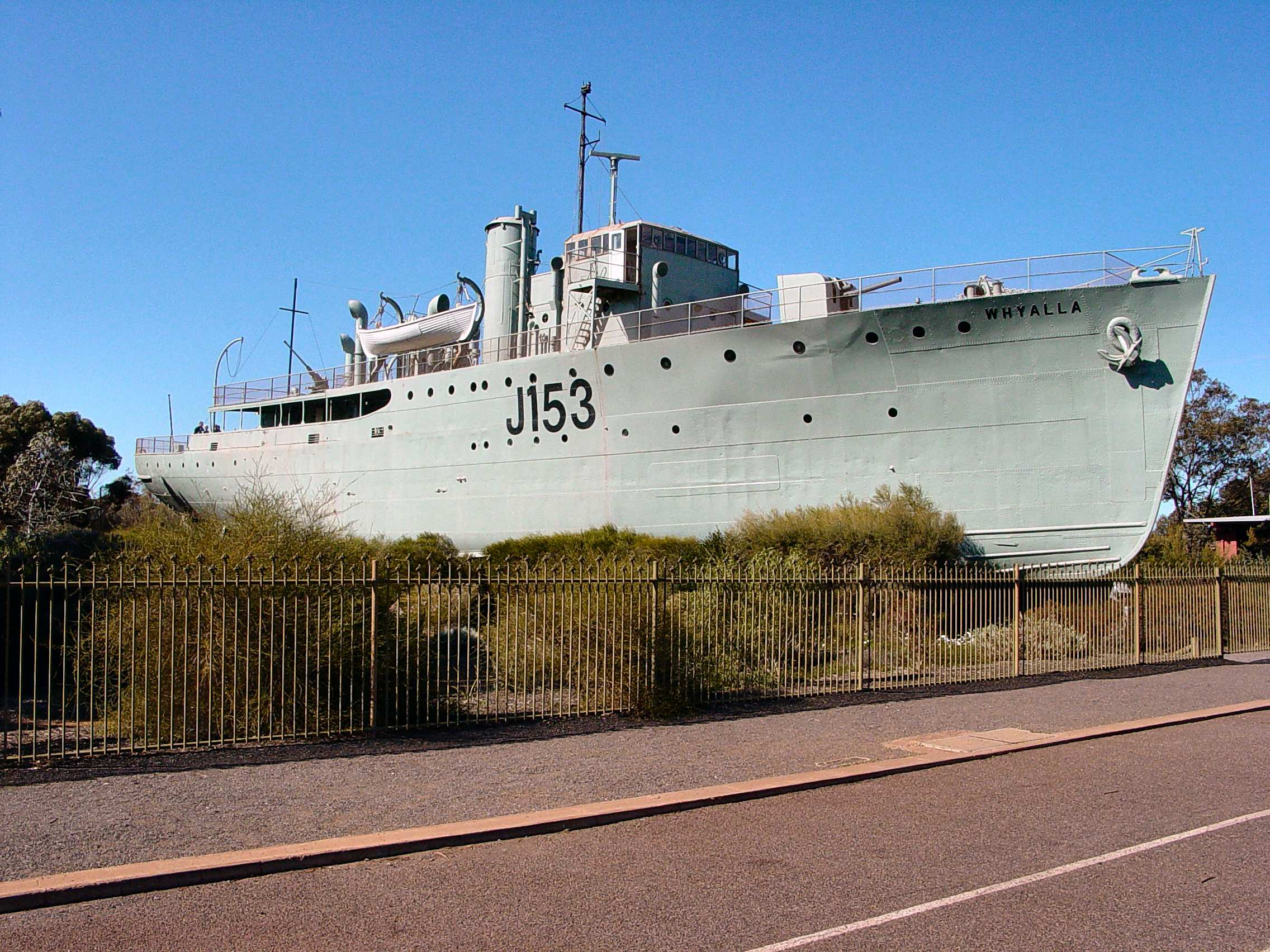
HMAS Whyalla was built at the BHP shipyards and now sits ashore adjacent to the Whyalla Visitors Centre

The steelworks first established a plant for the production of pig-iron for sale or use at other BHP plants. The announcement was made in 1937 and South Australian legislation was prepared to facilitate the development. Water security for the project was also guaranteed by the development of the Morgan-Whyalla pipeline. The Whyalla Steelworks was opened in May 1941 with the first blast furnace "blown in". A shipyard was also constructed, designed to aid the British Commonwealth's efforts in World War II. After the war, the steelworks and shipyards continued to produce a range of products including rail track and maritime vessels for commercial use.

In the 1960s, a BOS rolling mills and coke ovens were constructed, enabling the Whyalla plant to become a fully integrated steelworks.

Various records were set and milestones met by the Whyalla shipyards. In 1947, Australia's largest domestically built vessel, the bulk carrier Iron Yampi, was launched. It was built for BHP Shipping to transport iron ore from Yampi Sound in Western Australia. In 1965, the honor was claimed again, when the Darling River was launched. With the launch of the tanker Arthur Phillip in 1974, the Whyalla shipyard passed a major milestone, having produced over one million tonnes of merchant vessels in total. The shipyard also produced the world's first gas turbine-electric powered ship, the Seaway Prince in 1975.

BHP's shipyards continued to operate until 1978. Many of the vessels were produced for the use of BHP Shipping. The eventual closure of the shipyards came as a major blow to the town of Whyalla and plunged it into an economic recession, with 1,800 workers made redundant.

=== Equipment development timeline ===
- Blast Furnace No.1 was built between 1938 and 1941, blown in 1941, relined in 1965, closed in 1981 and demolished 1997.
- Blast Furnace No.2 was built in 1965, relined 1981 and again in 2004.
- The boilerhouse was built in 1941 with three boilers. Boiler No.4 was added in 1950 and Nos. 5 and 6 in the late 1960s. Only Nos. 5 and 6 remain in full-time operation, with No.4 on standby.
- The saltwater pump house was built in 1941 with three salt water pumps, with another three pumps added later. Only five remain, with No.1 later serving as a backup diesel pump.
- The coke ovens were built in the 1960s with two batteries. Another battery was added in the 1980s. The coke ovens were closed in 2023.
- A 1.5 GL reverse osmosis seawater desalination plant was commissioned in December 2011.

=== Ownership changes ===
In October 2000, BHP spun off a new company, OneSteel, a domestically focused steel manufacturer and distributor. Apart from the steelworks, it also owned Whyalla harbour, and iron ore mining operations along the Middleback Range, about 50 km (31 mi) west of Whyalla. In 2011, the steelworks employed 1,600 people, down from a peak of around 6,000.

After Arrium got into financial difficulties, with debts of more than A$4 billion, it was placed into voluntary administration under KordaMentha in 2016. After 14 months, KordaMentha chose a Korean consortium supported by POSCO. However, the state government chose a different bidder. In September 2017, British-owned Liberty House Group, a subsidiary of GFG Alliance, owned by British businessman Sanjeev Gupta, acquired the Arrium Mining and Arrium Steel businesses, including Australia's main steel manufacturer and distributor, OneSteel. The OneSteel brand was changed to Liberty OneSteel and Arrium Mining was renamed SIMEC Mining. At this time the steelworks had 3,000 employees, who took a 10% pay cut in order to make the sale more acceptable. Soon afterwards, Gupta purchased a majority stake in Adelaide-based renewable energy company ZEN Energy.

In December 2017 Gupta announced a transformation of the steelworks costing $1 billion, intended to increase its output from about half to 1.5 million tonnes per year, and reduce costs of producing steel, as well as adding new offerings and widen the market. OneSteel lost A$195m in the 2018 financial year. Gupta said that he had invested money in the company, including plans to upgrade the plant at Whyalla which included a A$700m solar, battery, and pumped hydro project to power the steelworks, via Zen Energy, another GFG Alliance subsidiary. He also had plans to construct the 280-megawatt Cultana Solar Farm outside Whyalla (later abandoned).

In 2019, GFG asked the government for state backing to loan money. By June 2020, it emerged that some contractors had not been paid. In March 2021 GFG's major lender, Greensill Capital collapsed, and GFG tried to sell Cultana. In October of that year, good profits from the steelworks went towards the repayment of GFG Alliance's creditors, and it was able to restructure its international debts.

In February 2024 the state government signed an agreement to sell hydrogen to GFG from its planned 200MW hydrogen power plant near Whyalla, which would enable the production of green steel. Gupta said that he aimed to make the steelworks carbon neutral by 2030. The blast furnace was plagued by technical problems in 2024, rendering it unusable from mid-March until early July. Many staff had their shifts and wages cut during this time. In August 2024, GFG owed many more contractors tens of thousands of dollars, causing problems to their businesses, and the blast furnace once again had to shut down, this time owing to a shortage of coking coal. GFG's hematite mining operations under SIMEC were running into trouble, leading to further financial difficulties for the parent company. In November 2024 GFG Alliance secured a $150 million loan, which Gupta said he would use the money to help pay its suppliers as well as fixing the blast furnace.

In early February 2025, Gupta announced that he would be selling part or all of GFG's stake in its coal mine in New South Wales, in order to free up cash to pay suppliers. On 19 February 2025, the South Australian Government amended the Whyalla Steel Works Act 1958 to ensure that the steelworks would go into administration, in part due to the dire financial situation of GFG Alliance, with KordaMentha to take over as administrators of OneSteel Manufacturing Pty Ltd. This came after many months uncertainty for workers, and the Liberty's unpaid debts totalling more than A$300 million, including royalty payments to government as well debts to other creditors. On 20 February, the federal government under Anthony Albanese announced a $2.4 billion joint state-federal support package for Whyalla and its steelworks, which includes immediate, short-term, and long-term spending plans. SA Premier Peter Malinauskas said that it was not a bailout for GFG, and that Gupta would have to pay the company's debt to the state, after they had paid the creditors and got the steelworks rolling again. On 28 February 2025 it was reported that creditors of the Whyalla Steelworks are owed more than A$1 billion, of which GFG Alliance says that it and its subsidiaries (the steelworks' largest creditors) are owed $500 million.

In September 2026, the No. 2 blast furnace was permanently shut down, resulting in about 600 job losses. The blast furnace had not been operational since April and was at the end of its feasible life, having been operating since 1965.

== Operations ==
In 2024, Whyalla Steelworks was responsible for 75% of structural steel production in Australia.

The iron-making department incorporates the blast furnace, coke ovens, and the power and services departments of the Whyalla steelworks. Molten iron is supplied from here to the BOS for manufacture into steel. Coke is produced on site from coal supplied to the plant from Newcastle or Port Kembla and ships are loaded with iron ore for shipment from Whyalla's port. Finished steel products are distributed by sea, road, and rail.

Approximately 1.2 million tonnes of raw steel is produced in the steelworks each year, with about 65% of that transferred by rail to Market Mills as billets for further processing. The balance of the steel is then converted to finished products at the Whyalla Rolling Mill. These products service the construction and rail transport industries.

In 2020, the slip at the former shipyard was recommissioned as a facility to decommission, scrap and recycle (DSR) large ships. It was reported to be the only facility in Australia capable of handling ships over 200 m (660 ft). The first ship through the facility was the former HMAS Success. The initial deconstruction work was done by McMahon Services at Port Pirie before the hull was moved across Spencer Gulf to Whyalla.

== Energy ==
The Broken Hill Proprietary Company (BHP) was responsible for bringing electricity to the townships of Iron Knob, Whyalla, their associated mines and ultimately the Whyalla steelworks. This was achieved by the construction of three powerhouses and network infrastructure to reticulate the power.

BHP commenced power supply to Whyalla in 1908 and Iron Knob in 1922. A second powerhouse was built in the 1920s to replace the first and was decommissioned in late 1941 (though it was still standing in the 1990s). The third powerhouse was built in 1941 as part of the No.1 Blast furnace. It features two turbo alternators and two turbo blowers and remains in operation. It provides electricity for use around the plant and air to the blast furnace. Compressed air is also utilised around the plant by a number of other departments.

The South Australian grid, run by the then Electricity Trust of South Australia (ETSA), was extended to Whyalla by the late 1950s. While the town's supply was progressively transferred to ETSA during the 1960s, BHP continued to supply much of its own needs and those of some other customers that were not economic to transfer to the ETSA network. As BHP's power needs grew it began to use grid power for a greater portion of its own needs. However, as of 2016 the steelworks continues to generate its own electricity to lower its energy costs and increase security of supply.

In 2005, Whyalla Steelworks had 66.5 MW of dedicated electricity generating capacity on-site. 57.5 MW of this capacity consisted of three turbo alternators driven by steam raised in various boilers, fired primarily by waste blast furnace and coke oven gases. The boilers can also be fired with supplementary fuel oil and natural gas. The boilers also provide steam for process use around the plant. Two 4.2 MW gas turbines operate exclusively on purchased natural gas. Despite this on-site capacity, the plant relies on purchased electricity for a substantial portion of its needs, and only exports power to the grid occasionally. Plans for the associated 280 MW Cultana Solar Farm were abandoned in 2021.

Santos has supplied gas to the steelworks for several years, and in February 2025 signed an MoU with GFG Alliance to start discussions to reduce emissions from the steelworks.

=== Green steel project ===
The Whyalla Hydrogen Facility was a proposed 250MWe hydrogen electrolyser (producing green hydrogen), a 200MW combined cycle gas turbine generator, and 3600-tonne hydrogen storage facility. A South Australian Government company called Hydrogen Power South Australia was established to own and operate the plant, which is expected to be completed in 2025 and begin operations in 2026. ATCO Australia, BOC, and Epic Energy would deliver the plan, in which the government has invested A$593 million. In February 2024, the government signed an agreement with GFG Alliance reaching "to explore opportunities for hydrogen offtake" from the WHF. It would supply power to the steelworks to produce green steel. The project was cancelled in 2025.

== Water supply ==
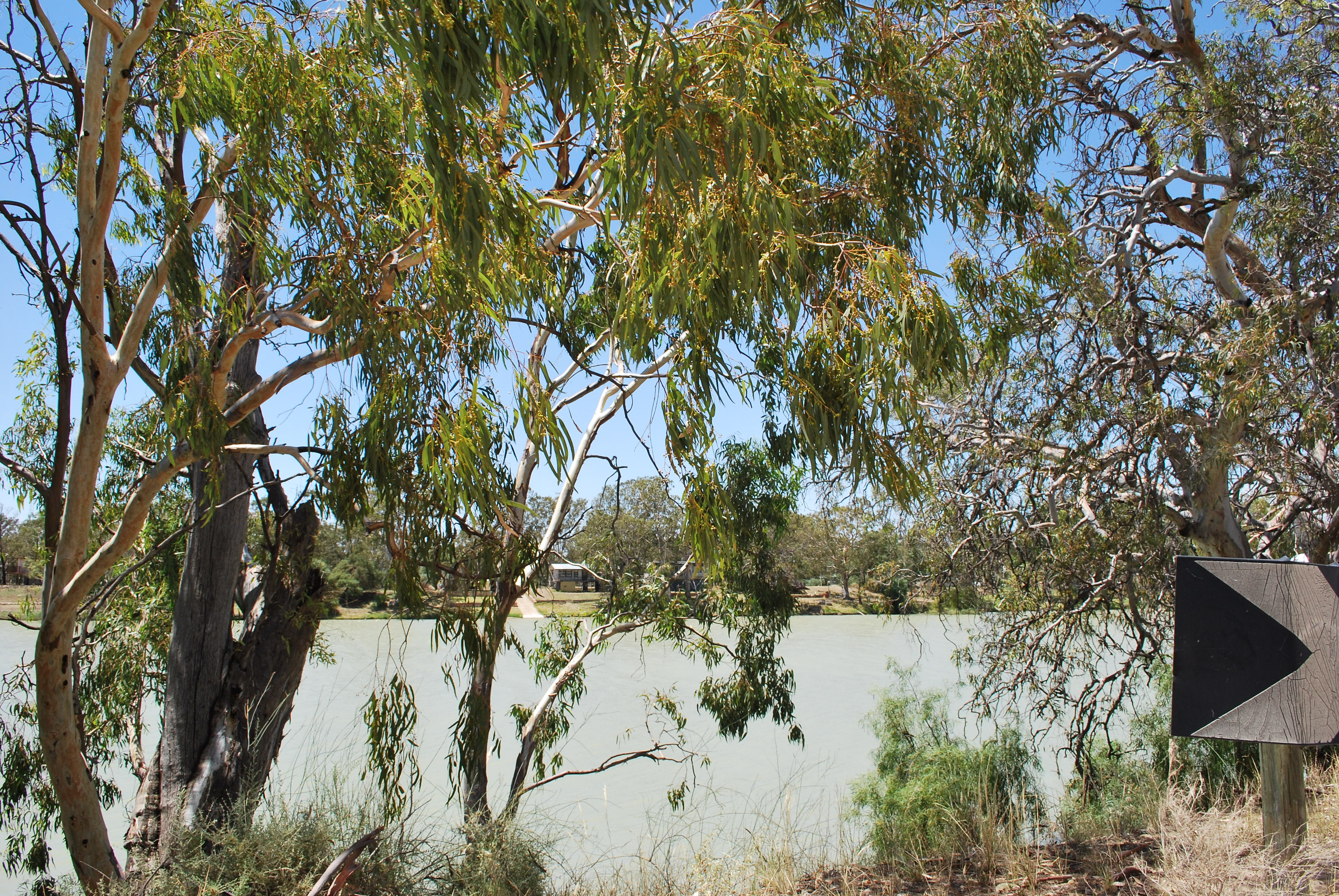
Morgan on the Murray River: the majority of the steelworks' water is pumped to Whyalla from here

The Whyalla Steelworks draws the majority of its required water from the Murray River, via the Morgan-Whyalla pipeline. In December 2011, a reverse osmosis seawater desalination plant was commissioned. Capable of producing 1.5 GL of water per year, the plant allows Arrium to reduce Murray River water consumption by up to 25%. The brine from the plant is discharged into settling ponds which flow into the waters of False Bay, Spencer Gulf.

== Railways ==
A rail network exists within the steelworks. Built as a narrow gauge network, it was converted to standard gauge in the 1960s. In 1901, a line opened from Whyalla to Iron Knob. In 1930, a branch opened from Middleton Junction to Iron Baron. The latter closed in 1947 being reopened in 1958. In 1990, it was extended 40 kilometres from Iron Baron to Iron Duke. After iron ore production ceased at Iron Baron in 1991 and Iron Duke in 1998, the line from Middleton Junction closed. With the reopening of the Iron Baron Mine in mid-2012, the line reopened to Iron Baron.

In October 1972, the 74 kilometre Whyalla railway line opened primarily to serve the Whyalla Steelworks.

== Red dust controversy ==
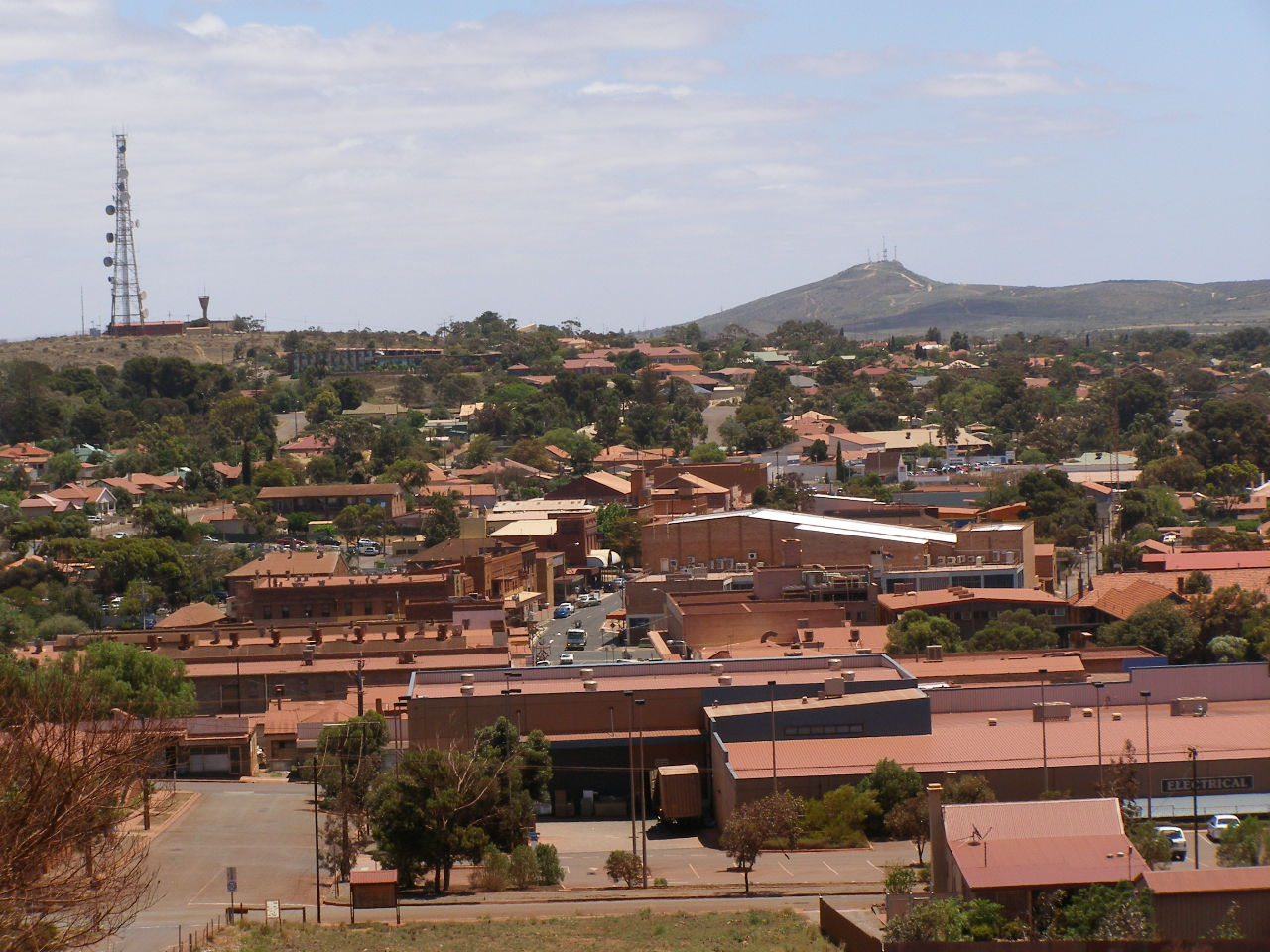
The rooftops of Whyalla are often pink with dust from the Whyalla Steelworks

Dust emissions from the Whyalla steelworks have been considered as a potential cause of elevated lung cancer incidence among residents of Whyalla. Between 1999 and 2004, 95 cases of lung cancer were recorded – 32 more than the Government of South Australia's Department of Health anticipated based on studies of other regions in the state. Concerns regarding emissions and their health impacts came to a head between 2005 and 2007, largely due to the efforts of the community-led Whyalla Red Dust Action Group (WRDAG). Residents of East Whyalla and students of the Whyalla Town Primary School were believed to be worst impacted due to their proximity to the source. Australian Greens candidate and environmental lawyer Mark Parnell represented the WRDAG. The public controversy was predicated by a legal case heard in the Environment, Resources and Development Court in 2005, EPA v. OneSteel. The case evaporated after OneSteel successfully renegotiated the terms of their governing Indenture Act, with the support of the Government of South Australia.

OneSteel responded by incorporating new processes into the design of "Project Magnet". By proposing to transport ore from the Iron Duke mine in a slurry pipeline, the company hoped to reduce opportunities for the emission of excessive red dust. The project was supported by acting Premier Kevin Foley. The project represented a $395 million investment in the development of Whyalla's economy with coincidental environmental benefits.

The Australian Democrats' leader Sandra Kanck was critical of the removal of the Minister for the Environment from the role of overseeing emissions licensing for OneSteel, concerned that the sole ministerial responsibility for the company's emissions was now left in the hands of the Minister for Mineral Resources. The government eventually modified the licensing conditions for the facility's allowable airborne pollution emissions, which included reducing the number of days per year that excessive dust was permitted. Breaches could incur a fine of up to $120,000. The company was required to report monthly to the SA Government with emissions reports and details of any remedial actions taken.

OneSteel eventually worked with the Whyalla Red Dust Action Group and sustainability consultants to address the community's issues and work towards a feasible solution. It said that Project Magnet was successful in addressing the red dust issue, mainly through the introduction of a wet crushing process in 2007. The company committed to working with council and community groups to improve the visual appearance of dust-impacted areas in Whyalla. The WRDAG was disbanded in 2010 after agreement that the red dust issue had been addressed.

== Vessels built at Whyalla shipyards ==
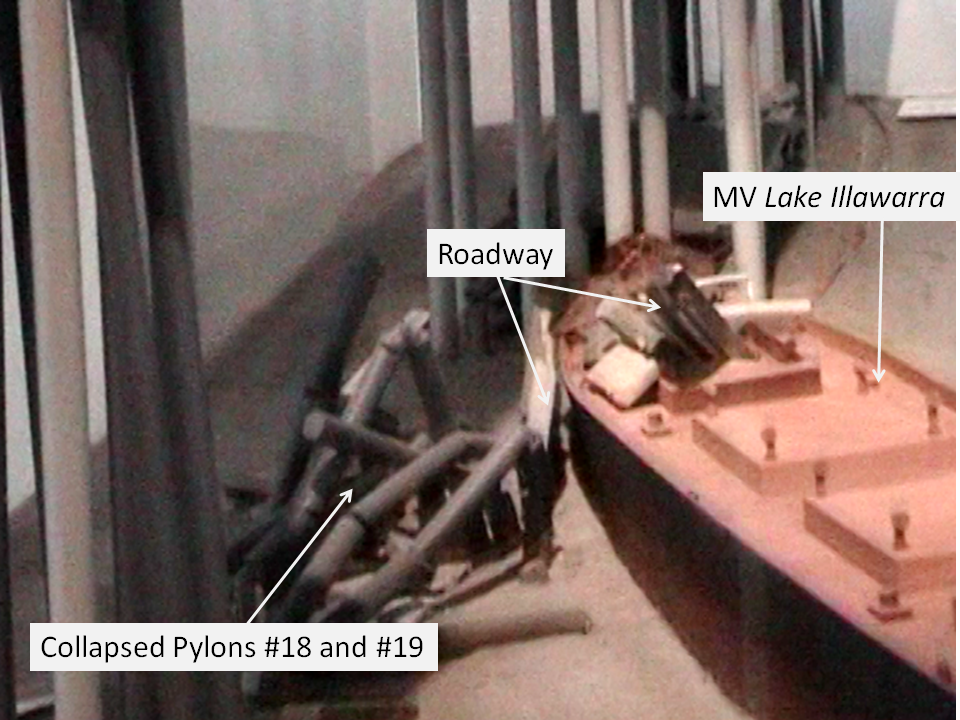
MV Lake Illawarra was sunk after colliding with the Tasman Bridge in 1975. 5 motorists' lives were lost

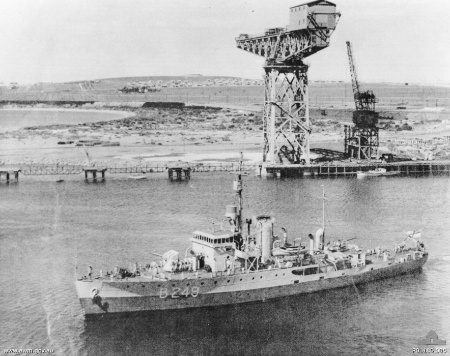
HMAS Pirie was launched in Whyalla in 1941

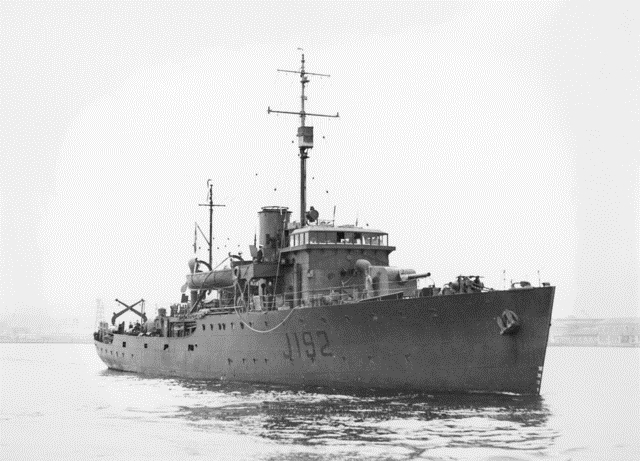
HMAS Kalgoorlie was launched in Whyalla in 1941

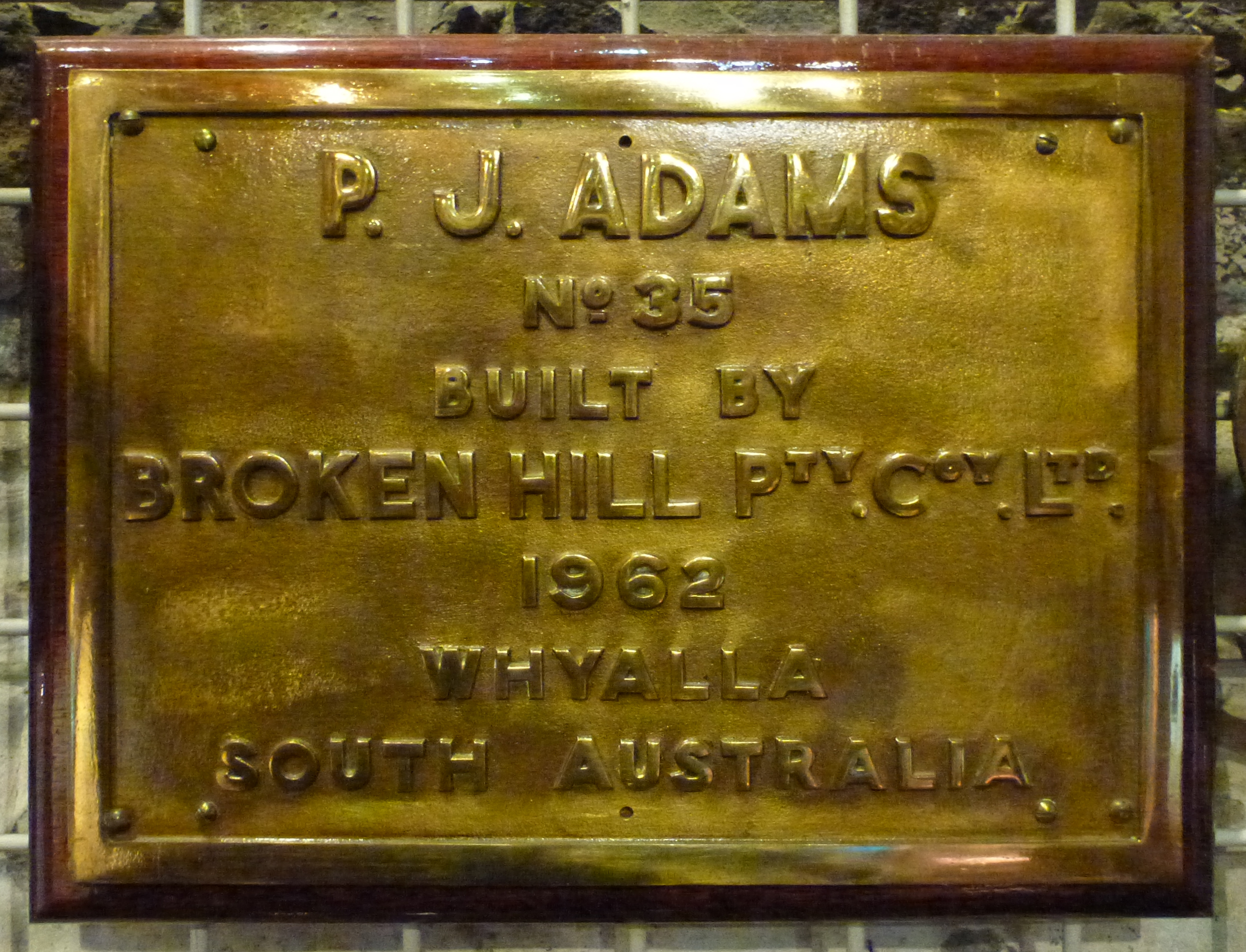
Plate from the vessel P.J.Adams on display at the SA Maritime Museum

Name	Type	Owner	DWT	Launched
HMAS Gawler	Corvette	Royal Australian Navy	690	1941
HMAS Kalgoorlie	Corvette	Royal Australian Navy	690	1941
HMAS Pirie	Corvette	Royal Australian Navy	690	1941
HMAS Whyalla	Corvette	Royal Australian Navy	690	1941
Iron Monarch	Ore Carrier	BHP Shipping	8160	1942
Iron Duke II	Ore Carrier	BHP Shipping	7740	1943
River Glenelg	Freighter	Australian National Line	9260	1943
River Derwent	Freighter	Australian National Line	9320	1944
River Murchison	Freighter	Australian National Line	9250	1944
River Murray	Freighter	Australian National Line	9380	1945
River Murrumbidgee	Freighter	Australian National Line	9290	1945
Dandenong	Freighter	Australian National Line	3040	1946
Daylesford	Freighter	Australian National Line	3030	1946
Delamere	Freighter	State Shipping Service	3010	1946
Barrigun	Freighter	Australian National Line	6350	1947
Iron Yampi	Bulk Carrier	BHP Shipping	13100	1947
Balarr	Freighter	Howard Smith Industries	6350	1948
Balook	Freighter	Australian National Line	6350	1949
Iron Kimberley	Bulk Carrier	BHP Shipping	12760	1949
Iron Derby	Bulk Carrier	BHP Shipping	11790	1950
Baroota	Freighter	Adelaide Steamship Company	6350	1951
Iron Wyndham	Bulk Carrier	BHP Shipping	13070	1952
Iron Whyalla	Bulk Carrier	BHP Shipping	10800	1953
Yanderra	Collier	Australian National Line	4830	1954
Yarrunga	Collier	Australian National Line	4830	1954
Lake Eyre	Bulk Carrier	Australian National Line	10160	1955
Iron Spencer	Bulk Carrier	BHP Shipping	12800	1956
Lake Illawarra	Bulk Carrier	Australian National Line	10160	1957
Lake Torrens	Bulk Carrier	Australian National Line	10160	1957
Lake Macquarie	Bulk Carrier	Australian National Line	10160	1958
Iron Flinders	Ore Carrier	BHP Shipping	19400	1959
Mount Keira	Ore Carrier	Australian National Line	14220	1959
Iron Dampier	Ore Carrier	BHP Shipping	19320	1960
Mount Kembla	Ore Carrier	Australian National Line	15240	1960
Mittagong	Bulk Carrier	Bulkships	16660	1962
P.J. Adams	Tanker	Ampol	32770	1962
Wollongong	Bulk Carrier	Bulkships	16660	1962
Seaway Queen	Roll-on/Roll-off	Union Steamship Company of New Zealand	3250	1963
Musgrave Range	Bulk Carrier	Australian National Line	21740	1964
Seaway King	Roll-on/Roll-off	Union Steamship Company of New Zealand	3250	1964
Darling River	Bulk Carrier	Australian National Line	49780	1965
Gerrigong	Bulk Carrier	Bulkships	21740	1965
Bogong	Bulk Carrier	Bulkships	55880	1966
Ocean Digger	Oil Drilling Barge	ODECO		1967
Cellana	Tanker	Shell Company of Australia	22350	1968
Iron Hunter	Bulk Carrier	BHP Shipping	55460	1968
Kanimbla	Container ship	Bulkships	10670	1968
Clutha Oceanic	Bulk Carrier	Hastings Shipping Company	55630	1969
Manoora	Container ship	Bulkships	15140	1969
Yarra River	Bulk Carrier	Australian National Line	55680	1970
Amanda Miller	Tanker	RW Miller	67060	1971
Mobil Australis	Tanker	Mobil Oil Australia	24380	1971
Clutha Capricorn	Bulk Carrier	Clutha Development Co	84330	1972
W.M. Leonard	Tanker	Ampol	25910	1972
Iron Duke	Roll-on/Roll-off	BHP Shipping	14630	1973
Iron Monarch	Roll-on/Roll-off	BHP Shipping	14630	1973
Arthur Phillip	Tanker	Botany Bay Tanker Co	67820	1974
Zincmaster	Bulk Carrier & Roll-on/Roll-off	Holyman	12696	1975
Seaway Prince	Roll-on/Roll-off	Union Steamship Company of New Zealand		1975
Seaway Princess	Roll-on/Roll-off	Union Steamship Company of New Zealand	5550	1975
Union Rotorua	Roll-on/Roll-off	Union Steamship Company of New Zealand	14550	1976
Union Rotoiti	Roll-on/Roll-off	Union Steamship Company of New Zealand	14550	1976
Iron Carpentaria	Bulk Ore Carrier	BHP Shipping	45430	1977
Iron Curtis	Bulk Carrier	BHP Shipping	45430	1978

== See also ==
- Whyalla Barson
