= Sanjeev Gupta =

Indian-born British businessman

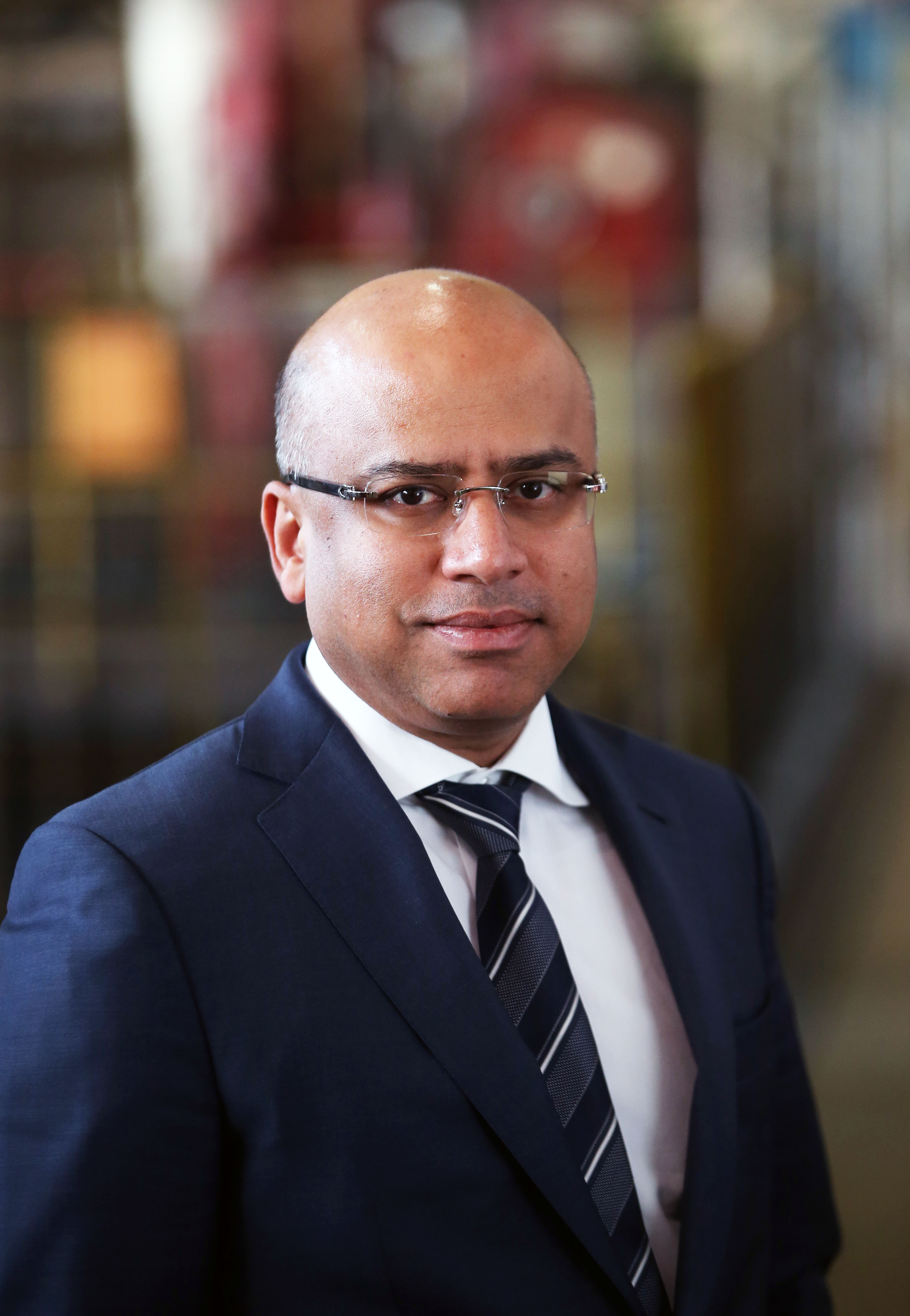
- Sanjeev Gupta
- Born: Sanjeev Gupta; 1971 (age 54–55); Ludhiana, Punjab, India
- Education: Trinity College, Cambridge
- Occupation: Businessman
- Known for: Founder of Liberty House Group
- Title: Chairman, Liberty House
- Spouse: Nicola Crumpton (m. 2008)
- Children: 3

Sanjeev Gupta (born September 1971) is an Indian-born British businessman who is the founder of Liberty House Group. He is the CEO and chairman of GFG Alliance, an international conglomerate that operates primarily in the steel and mining industries, its major subsidiaries being the Liberty Steel Group, Alvance Aluminium Group, and the SIMEC Group, which develops and produces renewable energy. After building the family business largely by the purchase of various steelmaking businesses in the UK, he purchased Arrium in Australia in 2017, followed by aluminium businesses in Europe.

Following the collapse of Greensill Capital in the UK in 2021, Gupta has been under scrutiny for his ties to the failed company. He is also in trouble in Australia, where his company that owns the Whyalla Steelworks was forced into administration by the Government of South Australia in February 2025, with unpaid debts totalling more than A$300 million. In October 2026, Liberty steel Newport limited (owned by Sanjeev Gupta) was placed into liquidation following a winding up petition by creditors. He has homes in the UK, Dubai, and Australia.

== Early life and education ==
Sanjeev Gupta was born in 1971 in Ludhiana, Punjab, India, the third of four children of Parduman K. Gupta, who founded the SIMEC Group. Both his father and grandfather were industrialists and businessmen.

At age 13 he was enrolled at St Edmund's School, Canterbury, UK as a boarder. After completing his A-levels he spent his gap year selling bicycles in Turkey for his father before enrolling to study economics at Trinity College, Cambridge. It was there that in February 1992 he founded the Liberty House Group. He was thrown out of residential halls at Trinity for registering a private business there, which breached the college’s charitable status. That repeatedly got him into trouble with the college dean. While his business was generating £1m a day, he switched to study economics and business management instead, a move which he claims freed up time to work on the business.

== Career ==
=== Trading roots ===
Initially, Liberty House traded steel, rice, sugar, fast-moving consumer goods, engineering and other goods as a part of the family business but it soon diversified into specific commodities and brought together the trading business under three categories—steel, chemicals, and agriculture. In 2009, it entered steel making, buying plants in Africa. A year later in 2010, it was in Asia, setting up the regional headquarters in Singapore and a hub in Hong Kong in 2012 to focus on China.

=== Industrial expansion ===
In 2013, Liberty House Group entered the UK through the purchase of Mir Steel UK (previously Aphasteel), a steel mill in Newport, South Wales, stopping it from being shut down. The business was formally re-launched as Liberty Steel Newport in October 2015. In the two and a half years leading up to the re-opening Gupta kept the entire 150 people workforce on half-pay while he tried to get the mothballed site operating again. Liberty Steel Newport produces hot rolled coil (HRC) for the following industries: construction, automotive, pipes and tubes, structural hollow sections, highway, yellow goods, materials-handling and power.

In November and December 2015 Gupta purchased from administration the UK assets and business of the former Caparo Industries Plc, saving over 1,000 jobs primarily in the West Midlands.

In March 2016 Liberty House reached an agreement for the purchase of the last two previously mothballed steel manufacturing sites in Scotland from Tata Steel UK. The deal, which was brokered by the Scottish Government, was completed on 28 April 2016 when Liberty formally acquired the Clydebridge and Dalzell steel mills. The Dalzell site which manufactures steel plate was re-launched on 28 September 2016 by Scotland's First Minister Nicola Sturgeon.

In April 2016 when Tata Steel UK announced its intention to sell its UK based operations, Gupta launched a daring bid for the business, and launched Liberty House's Greensteel strategy.

In October 2016, Liberty House launched its steel recycling division called Liberty Metals Recycling.

In November 2016, Gupta finalised the purchase of Tungsten Bank, and renamed it Wyelands Bank, after the country house estate Wyelands he owns near Chepstow.

In November 2016 Liberty House entered into exclusive negotiations with Tata Steel UK for the acquisition of its speciality steels business based in West Yorkshire and China. In February 2017 Tata Steel UK and Liberty House signed an agreement on the purchase, and the deal was completed in April 2017. The acquisition saved 1,700 jobs across sites in Rotherham, Stocksbridge and Brinsworth, Bolton and Wednesbury.

In December 2016, the Gupta-led GFG Alliance completed the acquisition of Britain's last aluminium smelter at Fort William in Lochaber, along with the hydro-power plants at Kinlochleven and Fort William.

In August 2017, after it had entered voluntary administration, Gupta's Liberty Steel acquired Australian iron and steelmaking business Arrium, which included the Whyalla Steelworks in South Australia.

In December 2017, Gupta entered the US market by acquiring the Georgetown steelworks and expanded the US presence by acquiring Export Metals in March 2018. At the end of 2018, he purchased Keystone Consolidated Industries.

During December 2018, Gupta acquired Aluminium Dunkerque, the largest aluminium smelter in Europe. This followed the acquisition of AR Industries, a French aluminium wheel manufacturer.

In April 2019, Gupta acquired a second bank which he renamed the Commonwealth Trade Bank. He then doubled the GFG Alliance workforce in July 2019, by acquiring seven steelworks and five service centres across seven countries in continental Europe from ArcelorMittal.

In October 2019, Gupta consolidated all his global steel businesses to form Liberty Steel Group, which he announced would aim to be the world's first carbon neutral company by 2030. He extended that target to his aluminium businesses, which he grouped together to form ALVANCE Aluminium Group, which he announced in January 2020.

Gupta has been dubbed the man who can save the British steel industry (now known as the destroyer of steel) through an approach called Greensteel, and has since been working to apply this model of operation to other countries, including Australia and the United States.

In 2026, he lost his UK steelworks after he failed to pay into the workforce's pension. He has made a mockery of the UK Steelworks

Having founded Liberty Steel Central Europe Holdings Pte. Ltd. in Singapore on 22 December 2022 he successfully bid €55M on Dunaferr Steel Mill, Hungary's largest steel mill and became the new owner, adding Dunaferr to his portfolio.

== Awards and recognition ==
The HRH Prince of Wales appointed Gupta as an official HRH Ambassador for Industrial Cadets in March 2018.

== Legal problems ==
=== Ties to Greensill Capital ===
Following the 2021 collapse of Greensill Capital, Gupta has been under scrutiny for his ties to the failed company, involving opaque financing and sales invoices that Greensill's administrator has been unable to verify. In April 2021, a Member of Parliament in the UK accused Gupta of running "a potential Ponzi scheme". Greensill Capital's bankruptcy administrator was unable to verify invoices underpinning certain loans to Gupta, with companies listed on the invoices denying that they had ever done business with Gupta. The collapse revealed that Greensill had lent £400m to companies owned or linked to Gupta, using the coronavirus large business interruption loan scheme (CLBILS), which benefited from an 80% government guarantee.

In May 2022, the Serious Fraud Office (SFO) announced they were launching a criminal investigation into the Gupta Family Group Alliance (GFG) into suspected fraud linked to the collapse of Greensill Capital. This is ongoing.

In April 2024, Grant Thornton, the administrators for Greensill, published a report revealing that they were still owed round $587.2m (£472m) from GFG Alliance. As of February 2025, Gupta's companies are still under investigation by the SFO, which "is investigating suspected fraud, fraudulent trading and money laundering in relation to the financing and conduct of the business of companies within the Gupta Family Group (GFG) Alliance, including its financing arrangements with Greensill Capital UK Ltd".

=== Companies House prosecution ===
In October 2024, Gupta was being prosecuted by Companies House for failing to file accounts for 76 companies listed in Britain, including Liberty Commodities. Gupta pled not guilty.

=== Australia investigations ===
In April 2026, the Australian Securities and Investments Commission announced that it was investigating the "complex web of private companies" linked to GFG in Australia, following the failures of the Whyalla Steelworks, the Tahmoor Colliery, and the Liberty Bell Bay manganese smelter at Bell Bay, Tasmania.

=== Liberty Ostrava insolvency ===
In June 2024, Liberty Ostrava, a major Czech steelmaker owned through Gupta's Liberty Steel and whose former board members included Gupta, entered insolvency after saying it was unable to meet overdue liabilities exceeding CZK 5 billion (€200m). The company had previously shut down most operations amid weak demand, energy-supply disputes and restructuring difficulties, and its main plant and coking facility were later sold in insolvency proceedings for CZK 3 billion (€120m).

In April 2026, the insolvency administrator of Liberty Ostrava filed an action to supplement the liabilities, seeking payment of CZK 18.9 billion (€756m) from the former members of the board, including Gupta. According to the administrator, the defendants caused the company’s insolvency by carrying out a series of transactions with related parties, as a result of which cash and emission allowances of substantial value were transferred out of the company, while the company did not receive either the cash funds back or payment for the emission allowances. According to the action, the defendants, as members of the board of directors, flagrantly breached their duty to act with the care of a prudent businessperson.

== Personal life ==
Gupta's wife Nicola Crumpton is from Canvey Island, Essex, and was the treasurer of his company. Gupta had kept his relationship with Crumpton secret for seven years before they married in 2008, the family's first cross-cultural marriage. They have three children.

From 2017, after acquiring Arrium in Australia, Gupta was based in Sydney for two years. In 2019 he moved back to his London base. Gupta and Crumpton bought a £42 million ($60 million) townhouse in Belgravia, London, during 2021. In 2019 they also owned Wyelands, a country house estate near Chepstow in Wales. In October 2019 they bought Bomera, an eight-bedroom, five-bathroom, 19th-century Italianate villa in Potts Point, Sydney, Australia, which they purchased for A$34 million. Gupta had previously been renting an apartment for A$30,000 per week. In August 2024, Gupta bought a waterfront apartment in Woolloomooloo (near Potts Point), bought from radio presenter John Laws for at least A$10 million. At that time, he also owned a residence in Palm Jumeirah, Dubai. In February 2025, plans were approved to renovate his Bomera, including a new swimming pool, "wellness rooms", and a new water feature. At the same time, his company which owned the Whyalla Steelworks was severely in debt, with unpaid debts totalling more than A$300 million.

As of February 2025 Gupta was living in Dubai.

== See also ==
- Tata Steel Europe
