= DC class =

DC class may refer to:

- New Zealand DC class locomotive, diesel-electric locomotive
- TasRail DC class, diesel locomotive
