= TasRail DC class =

DC class
Type and origin
- Power type: Diesel-electric
- Builder: General Motors Canada
- Model: Electro Motive Diesel G22AR
- Build date: 1964
- Rebuilder: Clyde Engineering
- Rebuild date: 1980
Specifications
- Configuration
  - AAR: C-C
  - UIC: A1A-A1A
- Gauge: 3 ft 6 in (1,067 mm)
- Wheel diameter: 1.25 metres (4 ft 1 in)
- Length: 14.10 metres (46 ft 3 in)
- Width: 2.72 metres (8 ft 11 in)
- Height: 3.76 metres (12 ft 4 in)
- Axle load: 18 tonnes (18 long tons; 20 short tons)
- Adhesive weight: 60.0 tonnes (59.1 long tons; 66.1 short tons)
- Loco weight: 82.0 tonnes (80.7 long tons; 90.4 short tons)
- Fuel type: Diesel
- Prime mover: Electro Motive Diesel 645C
- RPM range: 900 rpm
- Engine type: V12 Diesel engine
- Aspiration: Normally aspirated (Roots blower)
- Generator: Electro Motive Diesel D32
- Traction motors: Electro Motive Diesel 548
- Cylinders: 12
- Loco brake: Hand brakes/Westinghouse 26L air brake/Dynamic
- Train brakes: Westinghouse 26L air brake
Performance figures
- Maximum speed: 100 km/h (62 mph)
- Power output: 1,062 kW (1,424 hp)
- Tractive effort: 140 kN (31,000 lb_{f})
Career
- Operators: New Zealand Railways Department; New Zealand Railways Corporation; Tranz Rail; AN Tasrail
- Number in class: 1
- Numbers: 4588
- Delivered: 15 December 1998
- First run: 3 February 1999
- Last run: October 2002
- Retired: October 2002
- Withdrawn: October 2002
- Disposition: Scrapped

The DC class was a class of diesel locomotives in New Zealand and Tasmania. Originally built by General Motors Canada and Clyde Engineering between 1955 and 1967 as New Zealand Government Railways DA class locomotive. Eighty-five DAs were rebuilt as the DC class locomotive. Tranz Rail, a successor of the NZGR, sold DC 4588 to AN Tasrail. It has since been scrapped.

== Introduction and service ==
Due to a locomotive shortage due to the planned replacement of AN Tasrails English Electric locomotive fleet, Tranz Rail shipped DC 4588 to Tasmania on a one-year lease. The locomotive left Wellington on 8 December 1998 on the Arktis Dream, and arrived in Bell Bay, Tasmania on 15 December 1998. The locomotives were later sold to Tasrail. Due to the DC being in a non standard nature, low tractive effort and having a small fuel capacity, the locomotive was restricted to the Bell Bay Line, until Easter 1999 where it has ever since ventured out on the Western and Melba Lines, while still operating in Tranz Rail's Cato Blue livery, but with the "Tranz Rail" lettering replaced with the "Tasrail" lettering.

== Withdrawal and disposal ==
DC 4588 was placed into storage in October 2002 after suffering an engine problem. Rebuilding commenced on the locomotive in 2005 at East Tamar Workshops. The rebuilding included lowering the short-hood, replacing the big front cab window with two smaller ones, and a front cab door on the non-assistants side. By 2008, the rebuilding had stopped and was once again placed into long-term storage, until being scrapped in 2011.

== Class register ==
Key:	In Service	Under overhaul/repair	Withdrawn/Out of service	Preserved	Shipped	Scrapped

Number	Entered service	Withdrawn	Status	Notes
4588	February 1999	October 2002	Scrapped	Scrapped at East Tamar Workshops.

== See also ==
- New Zealand DA class locomotive
- New Zealand DC class locomotive
