= Arrium =

Former Australian mining and materials company

Arrium Limited
- Type: Public company
- Traded as: ASX: ARI
- Industry: Mining, mining consumables, manufacturing, recycling, and distribution
- Founded: Spun off on 23 October 2000 as OneSteel from BHP Billiton. The company then changed its name on 2 July 2012 to Arrium Limited.
- Fate: Acquired by Liberty House Group in September 2017 and renamed Liberty OneSteel
- Headquarters: 259 George Street, Sydney, Australia
- Number of locations: New Zealand, Indonesia, Chile, Mexico, USA, Canada, Peru
- Products: Iron ore, steel products
- Revenue: ▼A$6.085 billion (2015)
- Net income: ▼ (A$-1.9 billion) (2015)
- Number of employees: ~10,000

Arrium was an Australian mining and materials company, employing nearly 10,000 workers before going into voluntary administration in 2016 with debts of more than $2 billion. In 2017 it was acquired by British-owned Liberty House Group.

== History ==
=== Establishment ===
The company was spun off from BHP in 2000 as an almost entirely domestically focused steel manufacturer and distributor branded as OneSteel. Among its principal assets were the Whyalla Steelworks, Whyalla harbour and iron ore mining operations along the Middleback Range, about 50 km (31 mi) west of Whyalla.

The company subsequently expanded its businesses in mining, mining consumables, steel, and recycling.

=== Company acquisitions and sales ===
In 2006, an agreement was announced under which OneSteel would buy out scrap metal company Smorgon Steel for US$1.2 billion. However, concerns by competition regulator, the Australian Competition & Consumer Commission (ACCC), delayed the process, as did concerns by construction industry trade unions about possible job losses. The merger was completed in 2007.

In 2008, the company announced that one of the bar mills in the Hunter Valley and the mill in Melbourne would be closed.

In 2010, OneSteel acquired two companies, Chile-based forged steel grinding balls producer Moly-Cop, and Canada-based AltaSteel, a producer of ball stock for forged grinding balls, for a total of $932 million.

In 2011, OneSteel acquired the iron ore assets of WPG Resources for an estimated A$320 million. In the same year, OneSteel sold its Piping Systems business and associated property investments to US-based McJunkin Red Man Holding for a total of $100 million.

In 2012, OneSteel was renamed Arrium.

The company had three primary reporting segments:

- Arrium Mining, which then exported about six million tonnes of hematite ore per year to China from its Middleback Range mines.
- Arrium Mining Consumables, which included Moly-Cop grinding media, the largest supplier of grinding media (grinding balls and grinding rods) in the world, servicing the global mining industry, particularly the copper, gold and iron ore sectors. The business sold about 950,000 tonnes of grinding media per year in South America, North America and Australasia.
- OneSteel Steel and Recycling was a manufacturing, distribution and recycling businesses. The division manufactured long steel products, structural pipe and tube, and wire products in Australia; it distributed structural steel and reinforcing products in Australia through about 200 sites and supplied scrap metal to foundries, smelters and steel mills in Australia and internationally.

=== Financial difficulties and acquisition ===
The company employed nearly 10,000 workers.

The company, as Arrium Limited, accumulated huge debts and in 2015 it announced a full-year loss of AUD1.9 billion In April 2016, Arrium's directors placed the company into voluntary administration. Soon after that, to reduce Arrium's total debt of $2.8 billion, administrators signed a sale agreement for AUD1.6 billion to sell the Moly-Cop grinding media business – the company's only profitable division, which was not under administration.

In September 2017, British-owned GFG Alliance acquired the Arrium Mining and Arrium Steel businesses, including Australia's main steel manufacturer and distributor, OneSteel. The OneSteel brand was changed to Liberty OneSteel and Arrium Mining was renamed SIMEC Mining. The acquisition also included the Australian reinforcing company, Austube Mills; the Australian rail stockist Emrails; and product brands such as Waratah and Cyclone.

OneSteel lost A$120m in the 2017 financial year, and $195m in the following year. Gupta said that he had invested money in the company, including plans to upgrade the plant at Whyalla which included a A$700m solar, battery, and pumped hydro project to power the steelworks, via Zen Energy, another GFG Alliance subsidiary.

== Whyalla iron ore export ==
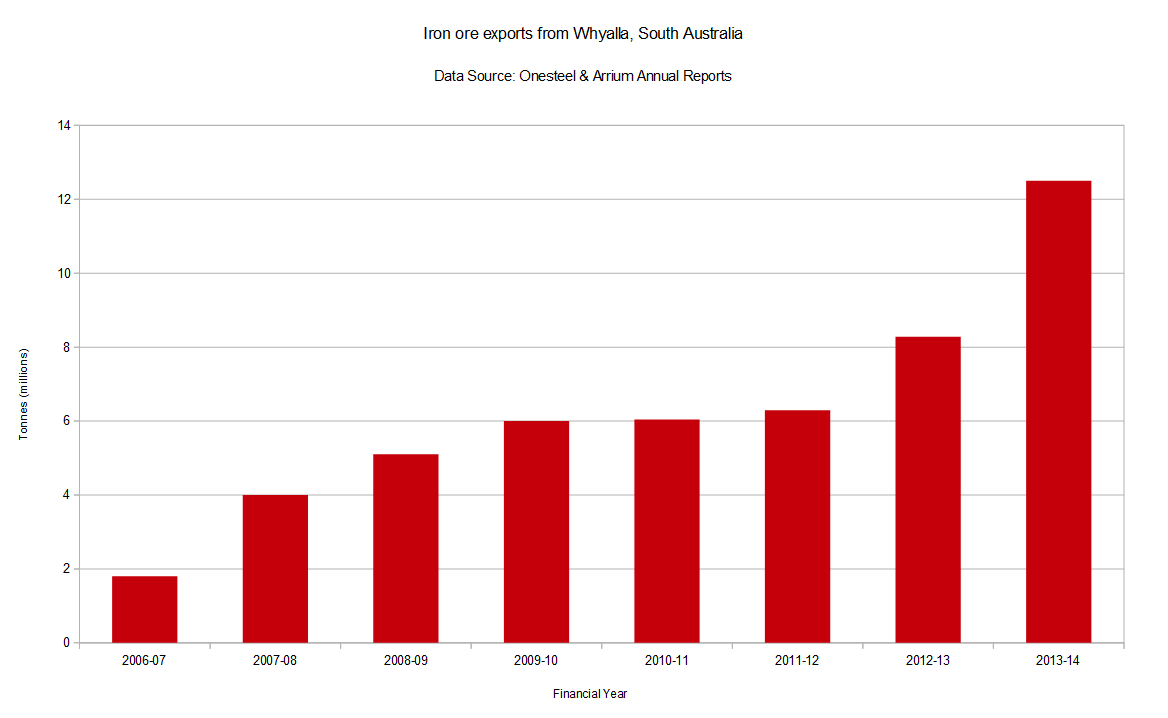
Arrium and Onesteel iron ore exports from Whyalla (2007–2014)

In 2007, OneSteel commenced iron ore export from the port of Whyalla via transshipment. In October 2012, a new dual gauge railway balloon loop was commissioned at Whyalla with the purpose of increasing Arrium's iron ore export capacity to 12 million tonnes per annum.

Arrium's iron ore export volumes from Whyalla peaked at 12.5 million tonnes per annum in 2013–14 and 2014–15. In March 2015, Arrium's Southern Iron project, which includes the Peculiar Knob mine, was mothballed. Export volumes were expected to drop to between 9 and 10 million tonnes in 2015–16 and again to between 6 and 8 million tonnes from 2017. In October 2015, the company announced that it was working with the South Australian government to facilitate third party use of the Whyalla harbour to make use of its excess capacity.

== See also ==
- List of steel producers
