= Leonard Curtis =

UK-based professional service provider

- Company type: Limited
- Industry: Insolvency and Restructuring, Funding, Legal, Business Services
- Headquarters: Manchester, UK
- Products: Insolvency, corporate recovery, restructuring
- Revenue: £14 million (2011)
- Operating income: £4.6 million (2011)
- Owner: Pollen Street Capital
- Number of employees: 330

Leonard Curtis is one of the largest independent firms in the UK specialising in corporate recovery, insolvency and business restructuring. It is a national practice with 330 employees operating nationally from 30 UK and offshore locations.

== History ==
The firm was founded by Leonard Curtis, who retired in 1983.

In 1997 the firm considered and rejected a merger with Levy Gee, a general accountancy firm that went on to form Numerica. Leonard Curtis partners stated that they preferred to remain a specialist firm.

In 1998, two offices in Manchester and Liverpool with 30 staff left the firm for BDO Stoy Hayward.

Later in 1998, Leonard Curtis formed a joint venture, Fisher Curtis, with the insolvency arm of H. W. Fisher. The arrangement lasted only two years before the firms separated again.

In 2023, it became a member firm of Nexia International, a worldwide network of accounting and consulting firms.

In August 2025, it was announced that Pollen Street Capital had acquired a majority stake in Leonard Curtis, which until then was controlled by Arete Capital Partners and Svella Plc.

== Awards ==
Leonard Curtis won the mid-sized firm prize as Corporate Recovery Firm of the Year at the inaugural Insolvency and Rescue Awards 2008, run by Credit Today magazine.

The firm was awarded Business Recovery Specialist of the Year at the 2010 Business Moneyfacts Awards. The judging panel said: "By providing companies with positive strategic advice, Leonard Curtis has enabled many of them to retain control of their business. The Corporate Strategies team continues to focus on the critical issues, providing clear recommendations together with restructuring and refinancing services to both growing and underperforming businesses."

== Controversy ==
"The Liquidation Game", a 1996 edition of Channel 4's investigative documentary Dispatches, made allegations of sharp practice in the insolvency profession. Keith Goodman, then a partner in Leonard Curtis (later both Senior Partner of the firm and President of the IPA), claimed that a case of his was presented in a biased way, and sought an apology. However, the Broadcasting Complaints Commission rejected his complaint, saying that his case was sufficiently well set apart from other more serious allegations in the programme.
