= Saffery =

British chartered accountants firm

- Type: Limited Liability Partnership (LLP)
- Industry: Professional services
- Founded: 1855
- Headquarters: London, United Kingdom
- Key people: Matthew Burton; Joseph John Saffery
- Products: Accounting; Audit; Corporate Finance; Outsourcing; Tax; Trusts; VAT
- Revenue: ▲£163.2 million GBP (2025)
- Number of employees: 1,391 (2025)
- Website: www.saffery.com

Saffery is a firm of accountants in the United Kingdom. It has nine offices across the UK plus a presence in Dublin, Ireland. The firm acts for clients across a variety of sectors and provides accountancy, audit and assurance, personal and corporate tax, and corporate finance services.

Saffery is a member firm of Nexia International, a worldwide network of accounting and consulting firms. Saffery's managing partner is Darren Drake who took over the role in January 2026.

== History ==
The origins of Saffery can be traced to an accountancy practice founded in 1855 by 21-year old Joseph John Saffery at London's Guildhall chambers. Saffery formed a partnership with William Palmer which lasted until 1865 when Croysdill, Saffery & Co was formed, with Saffery becoming partners with H Croysdill. In 1875, Croysdill, Saffery & Co became J J Saffery & Co.

In 1880, the Institute of Chartered Accountants in England and Wales (ICAEW) was formed and Saffery was a member of the first council. In 1885, Saffery's son Francis joined the partnership and the firm became Saffery, Son & Company. Joseph John Saffery became the Institute president between 1889 and 1891. Saffery laid the foundation stone for Chartered Accountants' Hall in Moorgate, London in 1890 under his presidency. Saffery died in 1900.

On 1 July 1982, Safferys and Champness Cowper & Co merged to practise as Saffery Champness. Champness could trace its origins back to Champness & Maclerie, co-founded by JH Champness in 1861.

In 1987, the London and High Wycombe offices of Armitage & Norton became part of Safferys Champness, with the other offices becoming part of Peat Marwick McLintock. Charles Payne had founded Armitage & Norton in 1868. Armitage & Norton, had expanded to include Oldham, Holland & Co. in 1975 and Dunn, Wylie & Co. in 1976. Oldham, Holland & Co. could trace its roots back to Cape & Harris, founded in 1864 by George Augustus Cape, also an original council member of the ICAEW as well as a founding member of the Institute of Accountants in London in 1870.

In 2010, Jonathan Fox became the firm's managing partner – the first non-accountant to lead a top 20 firm. On 1 October 2012, the firm announced the acquisition of the Film & TV Unit of RSM Tenon. The transaction enabled them to build their Sports and Entertainment Group.

In 2013, Saffery Champness was involved in developing and lobbying for the UK Tax Relief and were the advisers for the production's cultural test application.

In 2016 the firm relocated its London office to 71 Queen Victoria Street, London. In 2017, the firm opposed changes by the UK Government to require Scottish limited partnerships to disclose "persons of significant control", saying it was a "further erosion of privacy".

In 2021, the Financial Reporting Council opened an investigation into work done by Saffery Champness in auditing Greensill Capital's accounts between 2014 and 2019 after the company's collapse.

In September 2023, Saffery Champness rebranded as Saffery.

== Nexia International ==
In 1986, SC International, an international network of Saffery Champness, was founded by the firm. SC International included J.H. Cohn, New York's largest independent accounting firm at the time.

In 2007, SC International merged with Nexia International, the international network of Smith & Williamson, to form the world's ninth-largest accounting firm.

Nexia traces its history back to 1971 when it was founded by Spicer & Pegler in the United Kingdom and Oppenheim Appel Dixon & Associates in the United States. In 1990, Spicer & Oppenheim International merged with NR International (the international network of Neville Russell) to create Nexia International, following the UK arm of Spicer & Oppenheim becoming part of Touche Ross. In 1998, Neville Russell merged with Mazars and left Nexia, leaving it without a UK firm. Smith & Williamson took their place.

In 2012, J.H. Cohn merged with the Reznick group to form CohnReznick, and become the 11th largest accounting firm in the United States. In addition to CohnReznick, Maloney + Novotny is another Nexia International member firm based in the United States.

In July 2022, following the rebranding of Tilney Smith & Williamson to Evelyn Partners, it ceased to be a member of Nexia.

In 2023, Leonard Curtis Business Rescue and Recovery based in the United Kingdom became a member of Nexia. East Anglian-based Scrutton Bland are also a UK member of Nexia.

In August 2024, Nexia had 230 member firms in 123 countries.
