= Lex Greensill =

Australian businessman (born 1976)

- Born: Alexander David Greensill; 29 December 1976 (age 49)

Alexander David "Lex" Greensill CBE (born 29 December 1976) is an Australian former businessman best known for being the founder of Greensill Capital, a company focused on supply chain finance and derivative financial products that on 8 March 2021 filed for insolvency protection and faced legal scrutiny.

== Biography ==
Greensill was born in Bundaberg, a city in Queensland, in 1976, to parents who owned a sugarcane and melon farm.

Before becoming a banker, he was a sugarcane farmer and was expected to enter his family's farming business. This began to change when he arrived in Britain in 2001. After four years he joined the American bank Morgan Stanley, and then Citigroup.

He founded Greensill Capital in November 2011, which was based in London.

Early in his career, he served as a senior advisor to the British Prime Minister, David Cameron, with an office based in 10 Downing Street. He also claimed he was adviser to Barack Obama, after introduction by David Cameron.

== Demise of Greensill Capital ==
In the early months of 2021 Greensill Capital was on the verge of bankruptcy. Several criminal complaints were filed against the German subsidiary of Greensill Capital. The subsidiary, Greensill Bank AG, in Bremen was closed by Germany's financial regulatory authority on 3 March 2021. It has been reported in several media outlets that over half of Greensill's business came from bundling and reselling accounts receivable of Sanjeev Gupta's steel business, and that this is the cause of the company's insolvency problems.

In 2026, Greensill was prohibited from being a director of a company by the insolvency service for 9 years as a consequence of the Greensill scandal.

== Awards ==
At the 2017 Birthday Honours of Elizabeth II, he was made a CBE (Commander of the Order of the British Empire) by Prince Charles, for services to business.

== Wealth ==
Greensill was a billionaire and owned several private jets. He also frequently networked with the top echelons of the British establishment, including people like the former UK prime minister David Cameron and Neil Garrod, the chief treasurer of Vodafone.

Due to the legal scrutiny and financial difficulty faced by Greensill's firm in early 2021, Greensill is no longer a billionaire. Stemming from the collapse of the firm, he faces several lawsuits. Greensill and his family sold several million dollars' worth of shares in the company in 2019, more than two years before it collapsed. Despite having made the Financial Review 2020 Rich List, Greensill did not reach the threshold for inclusion on the 2021 Rich List.
