= Tahmoor Colliery =

Mine in New South Wales, Australia

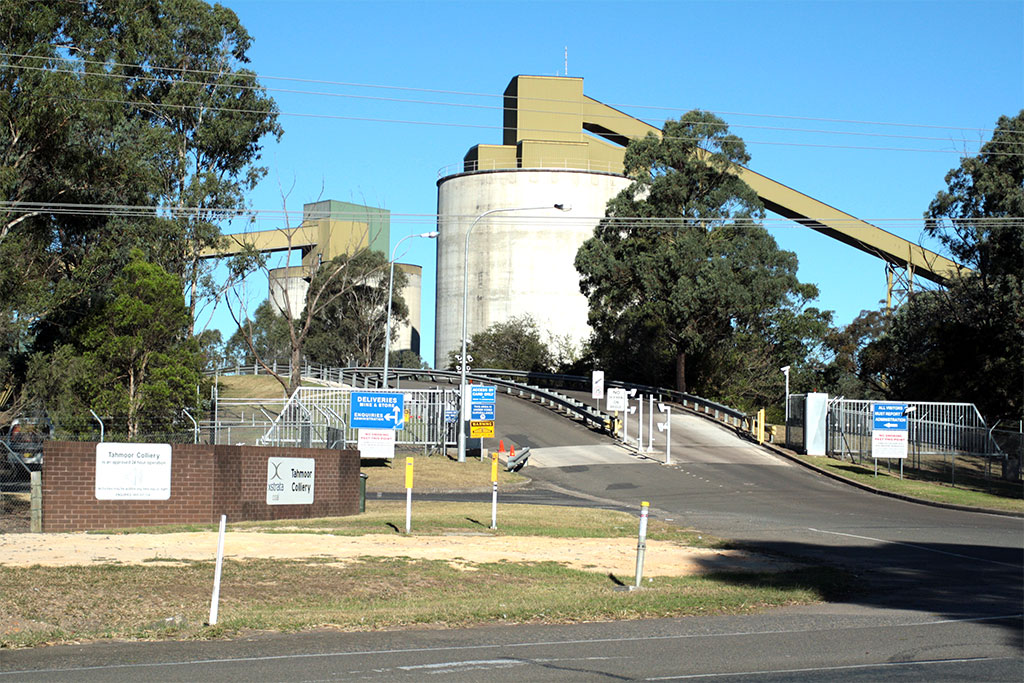
- Tahmoor Colliery entrance in April 2010

- Location within New South Wales
- Location: Tahmoor, New South Wales, Australia; 34.250°S 150.578°E
- Products: Coking coal
- Production: 2,000,000 tonnes
- Financial year: 2017
- Type: Underground
- Opened: 1980
- Company: SIMEC
- Website: www.tahmoorcolliery.com.au

Tahmoor Colliery is an underground coal mine at Tahmoor in the Southern Highlands region of New South Wales, Australia. Owned by SIMEC the colliery has been closed since February 2025 owing to financial troubles.

== History ==
Construction of the mine was commenced by Clutha Development in 1975, and opened in 1980 by BP Coal, which by then had purchased Clutha. It was sold to Conzinc Riotinto Australia in 1989, Austal Coal in 1997, Centennial Coal in 2005, and Xstrata in 2007. In 2013, Xstrata merged with Glencore, and Tahmoor Colliery became known as Glencore's Tahmoor Underground. Tahmoor Coal Pty Ltd was acquired on 20 April 2018 by SIMEC and started trading as Tahmoor Coking Coal Operations (TCCO).

In May 2025, the Government of New South Wales granted approval to the mine to continue operating for at least another eight years.

In February 2025, around 450 employees were stood down, initially on paid leave for four weeks, after being told that the shutdown was due to unpaid bills which had caused deliveries from key suppliers to be paused. As of June 2025, the colliery was still not operational, with 560 workers having been stood down indefinitely, owing to the ongoing financial problems of parent company GFG Alliance. In February 2026 Tahmoor Coal Pty Ltd was placed in administration. In March 2026 McGrathNicol began the liquidation process with the mine placed up for sale.

=== Incidents ===
Tahmoor Colliery has a history of outbursts, in which gas trapped in the coal violently escapes during mining, throwing hundreds of tonnes of coal and rock, and large amounts of suffocating gas. One miner was killed as a consequence of one of these outbursts in 1985. In 1994, it was reported that Tahmoor had recorded 89 outbursts up to April 1992. In response to that fatality, practices and equipment were upgraded, initially to provide a separately-ventilated and armoured operator cabin, and later to provide remote control.

In September 2018, two men were trapped 160 metres (520 ft) underground when the lift cage jammed in the mine shaft. They were uninjured, and rescued late in the evening by Fire & Rescue New South Wales.

== Description ==
As of June 2025 the colliery is operated by SIMEC. As of May 2025 the mine was up for sale, with a price of $800 million.

The mine operates in the Bulli coal seam. Most of the mine product is hard coking coal used for steel making. A small quantity of steaming blend coal used for power generation is also produced. Both products are exported to Europe and Asia, a total of 75% of its production. The mine was reported in 2017 as having 57 Mt (56,000,000 long tons; 63,000,000 short tons) of reserves and 650 Mt (640,000,000 long tons; 720,000,000 short tons) total resource.

The mine produces a high level of carbon emissions, second highest of all coal mines in NSW, releasing over a million tonnes of carbon dioxide in 2024 just from its operations.

=== Railway connection ===
The colliery is connected to the Main Southern railway line via a balloon loop built by Hornibrook that opened in May 1981. In 2013, extension of the mine was anticipated to take it below a railway tunnel on the Main Southern railway line. To avoid the risk of subsidence within the tunnel, Xstrata funded the construction of a diversion around Redbank Hill to remove trains from the tunnel, which was filled with rock and sealed.
