= Bell Bay Line =

Railway line in Tasmania, Australia

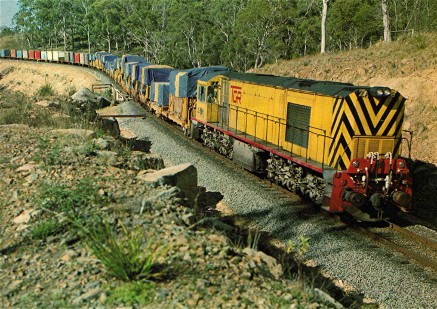
- ZA Class locomotive on the Bell Bay Line in 1978

Overview
- Status: In use
- Owner: Government of Tasmania
- Locale: Launceston, Tasmania
- Termini: Western Junction, Tasmania; Bell Bay, Tasmania

Service
- Type: Heavy rail
- Operator: TasRail

History
- Opened: 1973

Technical
- Line length: 57.3 km (35.6 mi)
- Track gauge: 1,067 mm (3 ft 6 in)

The Bell Bay Line is a freight rail corridor connecting the port of Bell Bay to the main rail network of Tasmania. The Railway Line was built in 1973 to connect the Longreach sawmill to the rail network, and was extended to Bell Bay in 1974.

Traffic on the line was initially limited to woodchip logs to Longreach, with the occasional train to George Town and Bell Bay. By the 1990s, log traffic to Longreach by rail was decreasing, and container traffic to the port of Bell Bay was increasing. Today the only traffic on the line is containers to and from Bell Bay. At present, the railway line is included in the Federal Government's AusLink initiative

== See also ==
- Rail transport in Tasmania
