= Corporate recovery =

Rescue of a company by accountants and financiers

A corporate recovery (also referred to as corporate turnaround, restructuring, retrenchment, or downsizing) is a rescue undertaken by professional accountants or financiers who are trained to assist the management of a company in financial and other difficulties. This work is usually initiated at the behest of the directors of the company and is normally undertaken by licensed insolvency practitioners.

Corporate recovery generally involves certain steps to achieve financial stability, such as asset liquidation, divestment, product elimination, layoffs, and operational efficiency improvements. Firms may initially undergo a retrenchment stage whereby they cut costs and stabilize their finances. This is followed by a recovery stage, whereby long-term profitability and growth are prioritized. Strategies for the recovery stage may include market penetration, re-concentration, segmentation, acquisition, and new product-market expansion.

To address recovery from ethical failures, companies often incorporate governance reforms, ethical training, and enhanced accountability measures during the recovery process. This helps to rebuild trust with stakeholders and ensure that future decision-making aligns with both legal and ethical standards, preventing a recurrence of previous failures.

Firms may assist in corporate recovery by offering services related to bankruptcy, financial advisory, performance improvement, trustee, and restructuring activities.
