= Bell Bay, Tasmania =

Port in northern Tasmania, Australia

Bell Bay
- Interactive map of Bell Bay
- Location within Tasmania

Location
- Location: Bell Bay, Tasmania
- Coordinates: 41.130444°S 146.859199°E
- UN/LOCODE: AUBEL

Details
- Operated by: TasPorts
- Size: 2,000 hectares (20 km^{2})
- No. of berths: 12
- Draft depth: 11.2 m.
- Rail lines: Bell Bay
- Rail gauge: 1067mm
- Street access: East Tamar Highway
- Truck types: B-Double

Statistics
- Annual cargo tonnage: 3.6 million tonnes (2021)
- Annual TEU: 20,299 (2021)
- Website www.tasports.com.au

Bell Bay is an industrial centre and port located on the eastern shore of the Tamar River, in northern Tasmania, Australia. It lies just south of George Town. In the year ended June 2021, 3.6 million tonnes of exports and imports passed through Bell Bay.

== History ==
Bell Bay Post Office opened on 18 September 1951 and closed in 1973.

== Industry ==
The Bell Bay Power Station was decommissioned in 2009, replaced by the Tamar Valley Power Station built next door.

Bell Bay aluminium smelter started operating in 1955. As of June 2025 it is operated by Rio Tinto (previously by Comalco).

=== Manganese smelter ===
A manganese alloy smelter built by BHP, known as the Tasmanian Electro Metallurgical Company (TEMCO) opened on 11 May 1962 produces ferromanganese and silicomanganese. BHP sold the plant to a Billiton subsidiary, Samancor, in 1998. BHP merged with Billiton in 2001, and so TEMCO came under the company's ownership again.

In 2021 it was bought by Sanjeev Gupta's Liberty Steel Group (parent company GFG Alliance), becoming known as Liberty Bell Bay. It is the only commercial ferroalloy operation in Australia. In May 2025 the smelter began a phased shutdown, due to a shortage of ore, beginning with a period of "limited operations". Tropical Cyclone Megan damaged infrastructure of South32's GEMCO, their main supplier of ore, in March 2024. The Premier of Tasmania, Jeremy Rockliff, requested assistance from the federal government in May 2025. The smelter ceased operating in mid-June for at least four weeks, with employees having to use up their leave. In March 2026 the company was placed in voluntary administration, with Ernst and Young appointed to wind up its assets. After the administrators were unable to find a buyer for the smelter, its closure was announced on 16 July 2026, putting around 200 employees out of work.

== Transport ==
Bell Bay was connected to the Tasmanian Government Railways network in May 1974, when the 35 kilometre Bell Bay railway line opened, branching off the North East line at Nelson Creek to the north of Launceston. Primarily built to carry logs for export, today it carries intermodal containers to and from the port.

== Berths ==
The first Bell Bay wharf was opened in 1927. As of June 2025 it has seven berths, which cater for cargo from the various industries in Bell Bay, along with others.
