= 259 George Street =

Sydney CBD office skyscraper

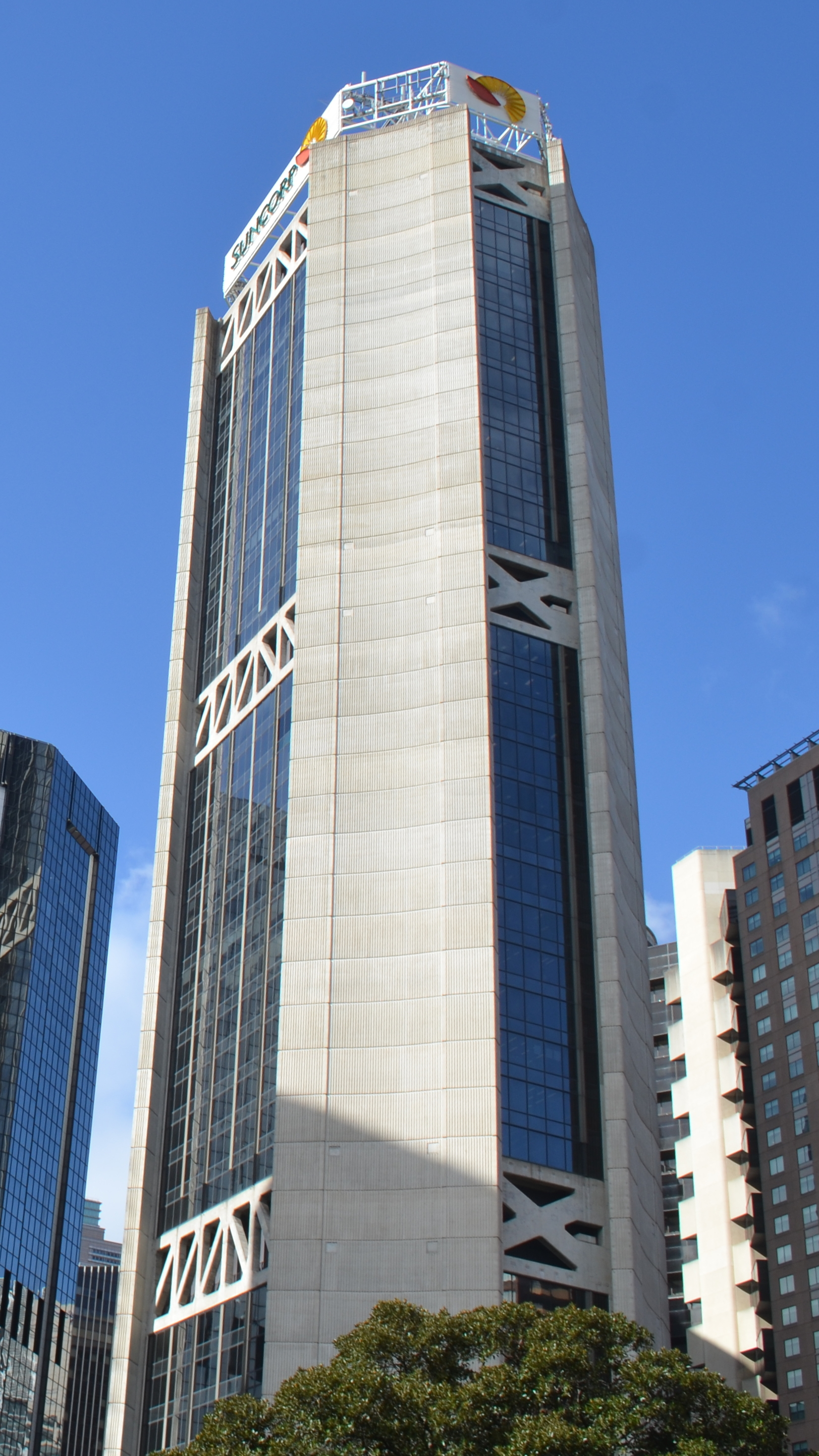
- 259 George Street from street level
- Former names: Suncorp Place; Qantas International Centre; AAP Centre

General information
- Status: Completed
- Type: Commercial Office
- Architectural style: Brutalist
- Location: 259 George Street, Sydney, Australia
- Coordinates: 33.8641°S 151.2064°E
- Current tenants: IBM; Australian Institute of Company Directors; Memocorp
- Year built: 12
- Construction started: 1970
- Completed: 1982
- Owner: Memocorp

Height
- Top floor: 182 metres (597 ft)

Technical details
- Floor count: 44
- Floor area: 44,252 square metres (476,320 sq ft)
- Lifts/elevators: 21
- Grounds: 5,680 square metres (61,100 sq ft)

Design and construction
- Architect: Ronald Gilling
- Architecture firm: Joseland & Gilling
- Developer: Dellingham
- Engineer: J Rudd & Partners
- Structural engineer: Miller Milston & Ferris

Other information
- Parking: 200+

Website
- www.259george.com.au
List of tallest buildings in Australia
Next Shortest Nauru House	Next Tallest Riparian Plaza; 200m
Heights are to highest architectural element.

259 George Street (formerly the Suncorp Place, AAP Centre and the Qantas International Centre) is a skyscraper located at 259 George Street, Sydney, Australia. It was built for Qantas and designed by architects Joseland & Gilling, and was completed in 1982.

== Description ==
The building is 182 metres (597 ft) tall and 42 levels to roof, although the rooftop structure brings the total height to 193 metres (633 ft). It offers a column free layout with floor to ceiling views of Sydney Harbour and the Sydney CBD and had a dedicated computer centre constructed underground to support Qantas' global airline operations.

== Construction ==
The building was first announced in 1966, with development approval given on 19 August 1968. Construction for Stage 1 of the project began in 1970, targeted for completion in 1973. However, the project was delayed many times due to industrial action by the Builders Labourers Federation, taking 12 years to finally complete in 1982. The foyer and forecourt was refurbished in 1994 and the building was partially renovated in 1997. Most recently, the lobby was completely refurbished with full concierge service in 2015 and End of Trip facilities named 'Zephyr' added in 2017.

== Anchor Tenants ==
In 1990 Qantas vacated the building moving to World Square. In 2005, Suncorp took out naming rights for the building and leased 15,000 square metres (160,000 sq ft) over 15 floors.

In 2018, IBM became the anchor tenant occupying 7,000 square metres (75,000 sq ft) over seven floors with naming rights to the building.

== Ownership ==
Initially owned by Qantas, the building was sold to the Commonwealth Bank Officers Superannuation Fund in April 1986 for $200 million, making it the largest commercial property sale in Australia at the time. In 1999, Commonwealth Property Office Fund acquired a 50% interest in the property for $127.5 million and the remaining 50% was purchased in 2005 for $125 million. The building remained under their ownership until its sale to Singapore based Memocorp for $395 million in 2011.

== See also ==
- "DA 44 80 0756 – 243–259 GEORGE ST SYDNEY – QANTAS CENTRE NEW BUILDING JOSELAND & GILLING". Sydney City Council. 29 August 1980.
