= SIMEC Group =

British international energy and mineral resources group; part of GFG Alliance

SIMEC Group Ltd
- Company type: Private
- Industry: Mining; Energy; Shipping; Infrastructure; Commodities trading
- Founded: 1996
- Founder: Parduman K. Gupta
- Headquarters: London, England
- Areas served: Businesses at 200 locations; trading business in 60 countries
- Key people: Sanjeev Gupta
- Owners: Members of the Gupta family
- Number of employees: More than 11,000 (2018)
- Website: www.simec.com

SIMEC Group Ltd is a British international energy and natural resources business focused on resources, sustainable power, infrastructure, and commodities trading. It is part of the GFG Alliance, which is owned by members of the Gupta family.

== History ==
The group was founded in 1996 by Parduman K. Gupta, whose son, Sanjeev Gupta, had established Liberty House Group in 1992.

In 2013, SIMEC Group refocused itself, mainly on sustainable power, mining, and infrastructure.

In 2016 SIMEC had an annual turnover of almost USD2.5 billion and net assets of USD350 million. As of 2018 it was trading in 60 countries, with 200 locations.

== Description ==
The SIMEC Group (along with Liberty Steel Group) is an independent company within the GFG Alliance, of which Sanjeev Gupta became executive chairman. The company is focused on resources, sustainable power, infrastructure, and commodities trading, Its activities span renewable energy generation, mining, shipping, and commodities trading.

== SIMEC Group in Australia ==
Among many developments since then, in 2017 it acquired Arrium Mining and OneSteel operations in South Australia for USD750 million. The mining assets of the former company included iron ore (magnetite and haematite) mines in the Middleback Range and a dolomite mine (to supply blast furnace flux) at Ardrossan, South Australia.

In 2017, GFG Alliance purchased Arrium's Whyalla Steelworks in South Australia, announcing that a new AUD600 million investment would lift production to 1.8 million tonnes a year. In 2018 the company announced it would build a new steel manufacturing plant next to the existing one. It would be capable of producing 10 million tonnes a year – making it the largest in the western world – and have infrastructure to eventually double that capacity.

SIMEC Mining acquired mining leases in 2018 for the Iron Sultan and Iron Warrior mines in the Middleback Range, 50 km (31 mi) south-west of Whyalla, reflecting the need for significant sources of iron ore for its expanding capacity.

Another member of GFG Alliance, SIMEC Energy Australia Pty Ltd, acquired a controlling stake in South Australian renewable energy and storage technologies company, ZEN Energy Pty Ltd, in 2017 and formed a joint venture named SIMEC Zen Energy. Sanjeev Gupta said his company was investing in large-scale power projects to meet its own industrial requirements.
