= Supply chain finance =

Financing methods that optimize cash flow across buyer–supplier relationships

Supply chain finance (SCF), also known as supplier finance or reverse factoring, comprises a suite of financial solutions that aim to manage working capital and liquidity for businesses within a supply chain. These arrangements are typically initiated by a buyer to allow their suppliers to access funding for their accounts receivable at interest rates based on the buyer's credit rating, which is often lower than the supplier's own cost of capital. The process is intended to provide financial stability to the supply chain by reducing costs for the participating parties.

A 2015 report estimated that SCF had a potential global revenue pool of $20 billion.

Reverse factoring differs from traditional factoring, where a supplier independently seeks to finance its receivables through a third party. As of 2011, the reverse factoring market was estimated to represent less than 3% of the total global factoring market. The technique has also been associated with financial controversy; for example, it was utilized in schemes that contributed to the collapse of the Evergrande Group, China's second-largest real estate company.

== Method ==
The reverse factoring method, still rare, is similar to the factoring insofar as it involves three actors: the ordering party (customer), the supplier, and the factor. Just as with basic factoring, the aim of the process is to finance the supplier's receivables by a financier (the factor), so the supplier can cash in the money for what they sold immediately (minus any interest the factor deducts to finance the advance of money).

Unlike basic factoring, the initiative does not come from the supplier who would have presented invoices to the factor to be paid earlier. With supply chain finance, it is the ordering party (customer) who initiates the process – usually a large company – choosing invoices that they will allow to be paid earlier by the factor. And then, the supplier will themselves choose which of these invoices he will need to be paid by the factor. It is therefore a collaborative initiative involving the ordering party, the supplier and the factor.

Because it is the ordering party that starts the process, it is their liability that is engaged, and therefore the interest applied to the deduction is lower than the one the supplier would have been given had they done it on their own. The ordering party will then benefit from part of the benefit realized by the factor, because they are the one allowing this. The financier, for their part, will make their profit and create a durable relationship with both the supplier and the ordering party.

Reverse factoring can be used by companies outsourcing a large volume of services (e.g. clinical research activities by pharmaceutical companies). The benefit to both parties is that the company providing the services can receive payment within 10 days or less, compared to the normal 30 to 45 day payment terms, while the ordering party can delay actual payment by 120 to 180 days, thereby improving cash flow. The cost of financing is typically a set interest rate tied to a market index plus a basis points adjustment.

== Concept ==
To understand how reverse factoring works, one needs to be familiar with trade discounts and factoring. Reverse factoring can be considered a combination of these two methods, taking advantage of both in order to redistribute the benefits to all three actors. There are 8 individual aspects of those three financing methods:

| | trade discount | factoring | reverse factoring |
|---|---|---|---|
| Eligibility | all invoices | all invoices | validated invoices |
| Financement | at the supplier's initiative | at the supplier's initiative | at the ordering party initiative |
| Sum financed | 100% of the invoice (-discount) | part of the invoice | part of the invoice |
| Interest rate | depends on the supplier's situation | depends on the supplier's situation | depends on the ordering party's situation |
| Payment | immediate | due date | due date |
| Impact on the working cash needed | negative | none | none |
| Financial interests | value of the discount (but involves cash outflow) | none | percentage of the discount |
| Deployment to other suppliers | slow (adaptation to each supplier) | none | fast |

== History ==
The concept of reverse factoring started with automobile constructors, including Fiat in the 1980s, who used this kind of financing process for its suppliers in order to realise a better margin. The principle then spread to the retail industry because of the interest it represents for a sector where payment delays are at the heart of every negotiation.

In the 1990s and early 2000s, reverse factoring was not used extensively due to economic conditions that did not allow it to be an efficient method of financing.

Aberdeen Group research published in 2006 highlighted the central role of a technology platform in realising a supply chain finance solution, defining it as a combination of trade finance functions and technology platforms. A Demica research report published in 2007 noted that businesses in the Nordic region, especially Sweden, made more extensive use of supply chain finance than elsewhere in Europe. In September 2009 the Bank of England invited relevant UK financial bodies to establish a working group in order to review the supply chain finance market at that time. The working group was chaired by the Association of Corporate Treasurers. The group was asked in particular to look at whether there was potential for the SCF market to be expanded, what impediments affected potential expansion, and how the various examples of SCF programmes operated. On the various programmes, the working group argued that "no one structure should be singled out as the preferred option", but concluded that for small and medium sized enterprises and/or companies with a weaker credit standing, buyer-driven SCF programmes, also referred to as "buyer driven receivables programmes", could ease access to credit on terms which were beneficial both to the suppliers and their commercial customers.

In 2021, the second largest Chinese real estate company, Evergrande Group defaulted. It had used retail financial investments to plug its funding gaps, raising billions of US dollars through wealth management products to repay other wealth product investors. The products sold were highly risky. Referred to as a type of "supply chain finance", investors would invest money in shell companies which they falsely believed existed to supplement working capital. As sales of the products fell, their business model became unsustainable.

== Advantages ==
=== For the supplier ===
The supplier has its invoices paid earlier; therefore, it can more easily manage its cash flow and, in the process, reduce the costs of receivables management. Moreover, as it is the ordering party that puts its liability at stake, the supplier benefits from a better interest rate on the trade discount than the one that would have been obtained by going directly to a factoring company. Reverse factoring is very useful for small companies that have large groups as clients because it creates a more durable business relationship, as the big company helps the smaller one and, in doing so, earns some extra money. However, this opinion does not account for the poor relations caused by unilateral changes to credit terms. Smaller companies are generally not given a choice regarding the additional cost of finance imposed by this process.

In a factoring process, if there is any problem concerning the payment of the invoice, it is the supplier that is liable, and has to give back the money he received. In the reverse factoring process, as it concerns validated invoices, as soon as the supplier receives the payment from the factor, the company is protected. The factor will have to get its money from the ordering party. Finally, in a trade discount system, the supplier is forced to be paid cash, regardless of its cash flow. Some reverse factoring platforms identified this problem, and therefore propose to the suppliers a more collaborative financing method: they choose themselves the invoices they want to receive cash, the others will be paid at due date.

=== For the ordering party (the buyer) ===
The reverse factoring permits all the suppliers to be gathered in one financier, and that way to pay one company instead of many, which eases the invoicing management. The relation with the suppliers benefiting of the reverse factoring is improved because they benefit from better financing, and their payment delays are reduced; for its part, the ordering party will gain some extra money reversed by the factor and pay her invoices to the due date. Making suppliers benefit from such advantages can be a powerful leverage in negotiation, and also ensure a more durable relationship with the suppliers. Moreover, it ensures that the suppliers will be able to find advantaging financing in case of cash flow problem: using reverse factoring assures that the suppliers will still be in business, and are reliable. With the reverse factoring, instead of paying numerous suppliers, most of the invoices are centralized with the same factor; it is always better for the accounts department to deal with one company to pay than several. This can also be simplified and speeded by using a reverse factoring platform combined with digitalization of business transactions (i.e. electronic data interchange). In the basic invoicing or factoring framework, the following risks threaten invoices: inaccurate invoice (fraudulent, erroneous calculation, or typographical error), an underestimated time of payment delay, an incorrect estimation on the object of the invoice (a service poorly executed) By using the reverse factoring, these risks are reduced to the buyer.

=== For the factor (the financier) ===
By taking part in the reverse factoring process, the factor realizes a benefit by making cash available to the supplier and supporting, in its place, the payment delays. However, in contrast to factoring, in this situation the factor is involved in a more durable business relationship, as everyone benefits from it. Another advantage for the financier is that they work directly with large ordering parties; this means that instead of going after each and every supplier of that company, they can reach all of the suppliers faster and more easily and do business with them. Therefore, the risk is less significant: it shifts from many fragmented risks to one unique and less significant risk.

== Market size ==
Given the competitive nature of the SCF market (approved payable finance) and due to the fact that business undertaken is covered by customer and bank confidentiality, sources of information regarding market size and players are constrained and not widely available in the public domain. As a result, indications on the market size are based mainly on estimates. As of 2013, the global market size for Supply Chain Finance was estimated at US$275 billion of annual traded volume, translating to approximately $46 billion in outstandings with an average of 60 days payment terms. It is still relatively small compared to the market size of other invoice finance methods such as factoring, which remains the largest trade finance segment and is primarily domestic in focus. The potential market for supply chain finance within the OECD (Organization for Economic Co-operation and Development) countries is significant and is estimated at $1.3 trillion in annual traded volume. The market serving European supply chains is approximately $600 billion. Based on these figures, the potential supply chain finance market size for the US is estimated to be approximately $600 billion in traded volume per annum. These programs are run both domestically and cross-border and in multiple currencies. Still, the market potential is far from its capacity. If examining spending of large organizations, such as Lowe's $33 billion in spend, it becomes apparent that supply chain finance programs usually require a multi-bank platform due to the credit and capital issues associated with banks.

== Market growth ==
In 2011, the reverse factoring market was still very small, accounting for less than 3% of the factoring market. As of 2013, market experts estimated that only 10% of the global available marketplace had been "satisfied" with supply chain finance, revealing a large potential market for growth. The market was expected to continue to expand at a rate of approximately 20–30% per annum and 10% per annum by 2020.. During this period, the highest growth of supply chain finance programs originated from the US and Western Europe. Asian countries, India and China in particular, are considered the markets with most potential in the coming years. The driving forces behind the rapid growth of supply chain finance programs are:

- Globalisation has increased the risk in supply chains and the impact on the financials of corporations.
- Working capital management has risen to the top of the Chief Finance Officers' and Treasurers' agendas.
- Strong interest from suppliers regarding the provision of liquidity and enabling lower financing costs.

== Further growth potential and challenges ==
Although supply chain finance is experiencing significant growth in demand, financial institutions are focused mainly on the large buyer side of the trade equation. As structured finance has been traditionally engineered and provided by banks specifically for large international trading companies, they do not use common foundations. In order for supply chain finance to take off on a broad scale, a fresh impetus is needed. A “tipping point” could easily be reached by solving the following challenges.

- On-boarding of Supplier. In a supplier financing program, the servicer needs to on board the buyer’s trading partners - the suppliers. The multitude of such platforms generates operational issues for suppliers wishing to benefit from various supply chain finance offerings via their buyers’ funders.
- Know-Your-Customer (KYC). Most funders require KYC checks to be performed on suppliers being enlisted as new trading partners. This procedure not only increases the total processing cost, but it also puts the business case for all parties including the service provider, funder, buyer and ultimately the supplier at risk.
- Available Capital and Liquidity. With 90% of liquidity in supply chain finance programs provided by large, global commercial banks, there is a large amount of trade assets, which cannot be covered by such financial institutions. Further regulations such as Basel III might impact the risk appetite and funding capacity of banks and make it more attractive for non-bank funders to step in and support supply chain finance facilities. Limited to large buyers. Today’s supply chain finance offerings are mainly addressing the large buyers with sound credit ratings whereas the real supply chain finance opportunity extends to large suppliers too, in particular in terms of payment assurance and risk mitigation.
- Proprietary legal documentation. Current Supply Chain Finance offerings use proprietary legal documentation, which makes the signing of non-standard agreements a costly, complex and time consuming process for corporate clients and their suppliers. Therefore, the market is currently facing challenges related to the absence of interoperability and legal standards.
- Standardized product definitions. The naming and definitions of the various Supply Chain Finance methods vary between suppliers, which makes it difficult for corporations to compare offerings and consider switching from one provider to another.

== Structures ==
Supply chain finance practices have been in place for over a decade. Three distinctive supply chain finance structures have emerged:

- Buyer managed platforms. In this structure the buyer owns and runs the supply chain finance platform. Some large retailers such as Carrefour or Metro Group are using this structure and managing the finance program, supplier onboarding, and liquidity themselves.
- Bank proprietary platforms. The supply chain finance structure is managed by large commercial banks providing the technology platform, services and funding. This structure is used by several large buying organizations such as Carlsberg, Boeing, Marks & Spencer and Procter & Gamble.
- Multi-bank platforms. The structure that has exhibited the strongest growth rate is represented by independent third party supply chain finance providers offering multi-bank platforms. This structure separates the entities, which manage the platform – a specialised service provider, from the funding partner, which provides liquidity and takes the credit risk. Based on the fact that funding in supply chain finance is uncommitted, no bank can fund in every jurisdiction or currency and due to the general limitations in terms of credit risk appetite and funder concentration risk.
- Market share. In terms of market share, programs are serviced and funded by a handful of players including large commercial banks. Together they manage over 40% of the market share. The rest of the supply chain finance is serviced and funded by a variety of local banks and smaller, independent service providers.

Often the reverse factoring is used with the dematerialization to speed the process. As the whole goal of it is to make money available to the supplier as fast as possible, a lot of companies decide to dematerialize their invoices when they start a reverse factoring system, because that way it saves few more days, plus all the advantages of the dematerialization (less expensive, and benefic to the environment). In average, it can shorten the delays by 10 to 15 days.

== See also ==
- Financial deregulation
- Paperless office
- Greensill Capital
