= GFG Alliance =

British multinational company

- Industry: Mining, energy, materials
- Headquarters: United Kingdom
- Revenue: $6 billion (2026)
- Owners: Various members of the Gupta family
- Number of employees: 16,500 (2026)
- Subsidiaries: Liberty Steel Group; Alvance Aluminium Group; SIMEC Group
- Website: www.gfgalliance.com

GFG Alliance (long name Gupta Family Group Alliance), usually referred to as GFG, is an international group of businesses associated with businessman Sanjeev Gupta and the British Gupta family. As of January 2025, the companies in the group are Liberty Steel Group, Alvance Aluminium Group, and SIMEC, which develops and produces renewable energy. Numerous GFG Alliance companies have collapsed since 2021 with 15 businesses currently in insolvency proceedings.

== History ==
In March 2021, GFG Alliance was struggling to secure new financing after the collapse of one of its lenders, Greensill Capital. GFG was put under brief observation by the German financial regulator BaFin for their business with Greensill.

On 31 March Credit Suisse began insolvency proceedings against Liberty Commodities Limited, a GFG subsidiary, at a London court. The action was brought by another bank, Citigroup, which was acting under instruction from Credit Suisse. It related to Credit Suisse's supply-chain investment funds, worth nearly $10 billion, whose funds were party invested through Greensill Capital, which had placed $3.6 billion in GFG, part of which had funnelled down to LCL. It was expected for the balance sheet of Credit Suisse to absorb significant damage as a result. The bank also launched insolvency proceedings against other entities affiliated with GFG. According to The Wall Street Journal, Credit Suisse would face difficulties in recouping the funds, as Greensill had split up loans backing the funds' investments (including loans granted to GFG Alliance) into a double trust structure.

On 3 April 2021, it came to light that the Jahama Highland Estates (formerly the "Alcan Estate") had been purchased in 2016 as part of the Rio Tinto deal for the Lochaber aluminium plant. The furnace power demand is supplied by the nearby hydro electric plant, which drains the basin of the 114,000 acre Estate. Alcan designed all their smelters that way. The Estate includes the north face of Ben Nevis. According to reports, the Scottish National Party mandated that the Estate never be split from the hydro plant and aluminium smelter but Gupta ignored them and placed ownership of the Estate in a company that is domiciled on the Isle of Man. The 2016 deal was worth £330 million and was guaranteed by the UK Chancellor of the Exchequer. Conservative finance spokesperson Murdo Fraser was critical about the alleged breach of the SNP agreement and urged the SNP to "take whatever steps are necessary to protect public funds".

In May 2021 investors began to pay more attention to the sale of GFG Alliance's French steel plants Ascoval and Hayange causing GFG Alliance to hire Rothschild & Co to run an accelerated Merger & Acquisition (M&A) process of the two assets.

In May 2022, the Serious Fraud Office (SFO) announced they were launching a criminal investigation into GFG for suspected fraud linked to the collapse of its main lender Greensill Capital in 2021. This is ongoing.

GFG Alliance was Greensill's biggest client and it was reported at the time of the collapse that it had an exposure totalling $5bn. In April 2024, Grant Thornton, the administrators for Greensill, published a report where they revealed that they were still owed round $587.2m (£472m) from the GFG Alliance.

In Australia, the Whyalla Steelworks were put under administration by the South Australian Government in February 2025 owing to longstanding unpaid debts by GFG Alliance companies. Liberty Steel's unpaid debts totalled more than A$300 million, including royalty payments to government as well debts to as other creditors. Creditors of the Whyalla Steelworks are owed more than A$1 billion, of which GFG Alliance says that it and its subsidiaries (the steelworks' largest creditors) were owed $500 million.

As of June 2025, the Tahmoor coal mine in Tahmoor, New South Wales was not operational, with 560 workers having been stood down indefinitely for several months at that point. The Liberty manganese smelter in Bell Bay, Tasmania is scheduled to cease operating in mid-June for at least four weeks, with employees having to use up their leave.

In April 2026, the Australian Securities and Investments Commission announced that it was investigating the "complex web of private companies" linked to GFG in Australia, following the failures of the Whyalla Steelworks, the Tahmoor Colliery, and the Liberty Bell Bay manganese smelter at Bell Bay, Tasmania.

In October 2026 Liberty Steel Newport was put into liquidation following a winding up petition from creditors due to unpaid debts.

== Ownership and structure ==
The GFG Alliance is owned by the Gupta family in the UK, with Sanjeev Gupta at the helm.

As of January 2025, the companies in the GFG Alliance are:

- Liberty Steel Group
- Alvance Aliminium Group
- SIMEC, which develops and produces renewable energy

As of 2021 there is an Alvance Aluminium operation in Poitou, France, and an aluminium warehouse in Dunkirk.

== Companies House filling ==
Numerous companies in the GFG alliance have failed to file annual accounts as required by UK law. This resulted in Companies House (the UK company register) prosecuting Sanjeev Gupta in 2024.
