= Greensill Capital =

Financial services company

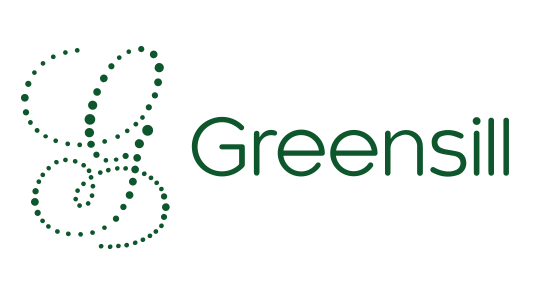
- Industry: Financial services
- Founded: 2011
- Defunct: 2021
- Headquarters: London, United Kingdom
- Area served: Worldwide
- Key people: Lex Greensill David Cameron
- Website: greensill.com

Greensill Capital was a financial services company based in the United Kingdom and Australia. Its main business was the provision of supply chain financing and related services. The company was founded in 2011 by Lex Greensill. It filed for insolvency protection on 8 March 2021.

== History ==
The firm was founded in 2011, with an initial focus on supply-chain finance. The company had since diversified its revenue streams, offering conventional banking services through a German subsidiary, Greensill Bank, the offering of bonds based on debt it has purchased, and through funds managed with partner organisations including Credit Suisse.

American private equity firm General Atlantic invested $250 million in Greensill in 2018. In 2018 Greensill was subject to extended media coverage and a call from British City grandee Lord Myners for a formal investigation of the company's involvement in scandal at Anglo-Swiss asset manager GAM.

In early 2019, Softbank invested $800 million in the company through its Vision Fund. This investment allowed Greensill to expand quickly, increasing its employee headcount from 500 at 2019's close to over 1000 in early 2021, located in sixteen offices. Due to the Softbank investment, the firm delayed considering other fundraising options such as an initial public offering. By late 2020, the firm had begun pursuing other investors, aiming to raise between $500 and $600 million and to subsequently complete an IPO within two years. In order to achieve its goal, the company agreed with an order by its board to sell all four of its planes, which included a Gulfstream 650.

In late 2020, Greensill began a search for a new auditor after growing too large for the firm's then auditor, Saffery Champness. KPMG, Deloitte, members of the Big Four, and smaller accounting firm BDO all declined to become Greensill's new auditor.

== Activities ==
According to its court filings, Greensill had three main businesses: supply chain financing (also called "reverse factoring"), accounts receivables financing (also known as "factoring") and a practice Greensill called "future accounts receivables finance".

In traditional factoring, a firm will sell the invoices it has issued to clients to a third party; the third party then collects the money owed from those clients. In reverse factoring, a third party (in this case, Greensill) instead pays debts owed by a company to its suppliers at a slight discount, but much more quickly than the original company would have. The third party later receives payment from the company. "Future accounts receivables finance" consists in the lending of money to a company before a sale has been made, based on the expectation of future sales and future payments. Because future accounts receivables finance is based on prospective — and thus uncertain — payments, it is considered to be a risky activity.

Though banks have typically conducted supply chain financing, regulation and capital restrictions targeting them have made such loans less profitable. This regulatory trend has in part led to the emergence of Greensill and other similar firms as they do not face the same level of regulatory scrutiny. Those in favour of reverse factoring say that it benefits suppliers as it settles their debts more quickly. Those critical of the practice generally oppose it as it can allow companies to obscure debts, and encourage habitual late payments by the stronger side in a business relation.

In order to finance its activities, Greensill relied on loans provided by specialised supply-chain investment funds managed by Credit Suisse: Greensill regularly issued notes that were often bought by the investment funds, thereby providing Greensill with cash. The repayment of the loans was secured by Greensill's claims to the repayment of the funds paid to its clients' suppliers. However, according to Bloomberg and The Wall Street Journal, the Credit Suisse investment funds are alleged to have bought notes tied to Greensill's "future accounts receivables finance" activity: these loans were only secured by future and uncertain sales, and were therefore riskier.

== Controversies ==
=== Financing of companies tied to Softbank ===
On 14 June 2020, the Financial Times reported that Softbank had invested more than $500 million into Credit Suisse investment funds that financed Greensill's activities. Greensill, in turn, provided supply-chain financing to various companies backed by Softbank, in what reporters called a "circular flow of funding". The funds' exposure to Softbank-backed companies amounted to 15% of its assets, according to marketing documents. In addition, the funds' investments has been solely sourced to Greensill, which was itself backed by Softbank. According to a March 2021 report by The Wall Street Journal, the amount placed by Softbank in the Credit Suisse funds was closer to $1.5 billion and had been invested following a request of Lex Greensill to Softbank CEO Masayoshi Son. By July 2020, Softbank had redeemed all of its investments in the Credit Suisse funds. According to Credit Suisse, other investors in the funds "suffered no loss as a result of these relationships".

=== Exposure to GFG Alliance ===
Until its insolvency, Greensill Capital, along with its German subsidiary Greensill Bank, had a significant exposure to GFG Alliance, a group of businesses associated with steel magnate Sanjeev Gupta. The exposure of Lex Greensill's firms to GFG Alliance totalled $5 billion. Conversely, GFG Alliance depended heavily on financing by Greensill Capital to conduct its operations. GFG Alliance relied especially on Greensill Capital's future accounts receivables finance program. According to the Financial Times, defaults by GFG Alliance are partly responsible for Greensill Capital's ultimate insolvency. On 8 March 2021, Bloomberg reported that GFG Alliance believed it would become insolvent if Greensill collapsed and had defaulted on some of its bonds. In April 2024, Grant Thornton, the administrators for Greensill, published a report where they revealed that they were still owed round $587.2m (£472m) from the GFG Alliance.

=== BaFin probe ===
In 2020, the German financial regulator BaFin opened an investigation into Greensill Bank's accounting. In March 2021, BaFin filed a criminal complaint against Greensill Bank and banned activity at the bank.

In December 2025, German prosecutors brought criminal charges against three unnamed people involved in running Greensill Bank in 2021; they are alleged to have avoided banking regulations.

=== Involvement of David Cameron ===
In 2018, former British Prime Minister David Cameron became an advisor to Greensill. While his position was unpaid, he was given shares that could have been worth £70 million in the case of an initial public offering. According to news sources, Cameron lobbied members of the British government on behalf of Greensill. In April 2021, HM Treasury released text messages sent by Chancellor of the Exchequer Rishi Sunak to Cameron from April 2020, which showed that Sunak had "pushed the team" to consider Greensill's request for emergency government-backed COVID-19 loans, before ultimately rejecting their application in June 2020. The Treasury refused to release the messages Cameron sent to Sunak, but revealed that Cameron had also "informally" called two other ministers from the department about the same topic. On 12 April 2021, Prime Minister Boris Johnson ordered an inquiry into the collapse of Greensill and the lobbying efforts of David Cameron.

=== Lending to Sanjeev Gupta ===
In June 2021 it was revealed that the government-owned British Business Bank lent Greensill up to $400m without detailed checks being performed. Greensill in turn lent all the funds to eight different companies linked to the steel magnate Sanjeev Gupta. The National Audit Office warned that the taxpayer could lose all the money that was lent, a potential £335m loss.

== Insolvency ==
In July 2020, a group of insurers led by Tokio Marine, which were insuring $4.6 billion of its working capital, announced to Greensill that it would stop providing the coverage. The decision came after Tokio Marine discovered that an employee at one of its subsidiaries had provided coverage that exceeded its risk limits. Greensill tried to obtain an extension of the coverage, including by taking legal action against the insurers, but was ultimately unsuccessful. After this failure, Greensill attempted to secure insurance from other firms, but did not succeed.

On 1 March 2021, Credit Suisse froze $10 billion in funds that were invested in Greensill's financial products and held by its supply-chain investment funds. According to the Financial Times, "Credit Suisse’s concerns about the funds came to a head because insurance policies covering defaults in a portion of its assets lapsed over the weekend." According to The Wall Street Journal, Credit Suisse was also concerned with Greensill's large exposure to companies tied to steel magnate Sanjeev Gupta.

In March 2021, Greensill considered filing for insolvency after the Credit Suisse freeze. On 1 March 2021 The Wall Street Journal reported that Greensill appointed Grant Thornton to help it during a possible restructuring or insolvency filing which was expected to happen within a few days. On 2 March Greensill Capital announced that it was considering selling the operating part of its business, according to a report by Bloomberg News, to Apollo Global Management or an associated firm, Athene Holdings. Greensill Capital stated the firms had a "period of exclusivity with a leading global financial institution with a view to concluding a transaction with them this week," regarding the sale. On 12 March it was announced that the deal with Athene had fallen through. The deal collapsed in part due to the low value of Greensill's assets, which were further reduced by the preservation of technology firm Taulia, through a partnership between Taulia, JPMorgan Chase, and other banks. Taulia facilitates lending from several finance companies to clients, but counted Greensill as a major source of business. With Greensill's role as a lender through Taulia taken over by JPMorgan, Athene had fewer reasons to acquire Greensill's book of business.

On 8 March 2021, Greensill filed for insolvency protection, as it found itself unable to repay a $140 million loan to Credit Suisse and was "hit by defaults" from Sanjeev Gupta's GFG Alliance, one of its main customers.

As of 25 March 2021, Credit Suisse executives estimated that the investors in its supply-chain funds could sustain losses of up to $3 billion. Prior to Greensill's insolvency, the funds' assets amounted to $10 billion.

=== Lawsuits and repercussions ===
On 15 March 2021, Bluestone Resources Inc., a coal mining company owned by West Virginia governor Jim Justice, sued Greensill for fraud. It alleges that Greensill departed from standard supply chain finance to engage in a more speculative practice, offering loans not only based on debts that other companies had already incurred, but also based on transactions that Greensill predicted would occur in the future. On 31 May 2021, it was revealed that Governor Justice had personally guaranteed the loans received from Greensill, totaling nearly $700 million.

A number of German towns and cities have pulled their money from small, private banks after losing millions of euros in the closure of Greensill.

Credit Suisse's chief risk and compliance officer and its head of investment banking were reported to have resigned, due to losses from Greensill's collapse and $4.7 billion in losses associated with Archegos Capital Management. In August 2021, Greensill's UK unit filed for Chapter 15 bankruptcy.

== See also ==
- Supply chain finance
- Factoring
- Lending
- Credit risk
