= Hundred of Cultana =

Cultana South Australia
- Coordinates: 32.90°S 137.64°E
- Established: 28 October 1940
- Area: 289 km^{2} (111.6 sq mi)
- County: York
Lands administrative divisions around Cultana:
Pastoral unincorporated	Jenkins	Spencer Gulf
Pastoral unincorporated	Cultana	Spencer Gulf
Randell	Randell	Spencer Gulf

The Hundred of Cultana is a cadastral unit of hundred located on the upper Eyre Peninsula in South Australia just north of Whyalla. It is one of the seven Hundreds of the County of York. It was proclaimed in 1940 by Governor Malcolm Barclay-Harvey and named for a Cultana Hill, the term Cultana deriving from a local indigenous term.

The following localities and towns of the Whyalla Council area are situated inside (or largely inside) the bounds of the Hundred of Cultana:

- Whyalla Barson (most part)
- Cultana (southern portion only)
- False Bay
- Port Bonython
- Point Lowly
- Point Lowly North
- Fitzgerald Bay
- Backy Point

The historic locality of Cultana (at the intersection of the Lincoln Highway and Point Lowly Road) is centred in the west half of the bounds of the hundred but is located outside the modern bounded locality of Cultana.

== See also ==
- Lands administrative divisions of South Australia
