= Cultana, South Australia =

Cultana South Australia
- Coordinates: 32.8°S 137.5°E
- Population: 9 (SAL 2021)
- Gazetted: 25 September 2014
- Postcode(s): 5700
- LGA(s): Port Augusta City Council; Unincorporated area
- State electorate(s): Giles; Stuart
- Federal division(s): Division of Grey
Localities around Cultana:
Corunna Station, Pandurra	Lincoln Gap	Port Augusta West
Katunga Station, Iron Knob	Cultana	Spencer Gulf
Myola Station, Iron Baron, Cooyeroo	Whyalla Barson; Middleback Range	False Bay; Port Bonython

Cultana is a locality on the northeastern part of Eyre Peninsula in South Australia. It is much larger than the original locality, and includes the Australian Army's Cultana Training Area. It includes the former Baxter Detention Centre which operated from 2002 to 2007. It spans the Lincoln Highway and Iron Knob to Whyalla Road, as well as being bordered by the Eyre Highway east of Iron Knob.

== Former locality ==
The former locality of Cultana was near where the Port Bonython Road meets the Lincoln Highway and included Tregalana Park. It was absorbed into Whyalla Barson in September 2014.

== See also ==
- Hundred of Cultana
- List of cities and towns in South Australia
