= Cultana =

Cultana refers to various entities in an area of northeastern Eyre Peninsula in South Australia. These include:

- Hundred of Cultana cadastral area
- Cultana, South Australia bounded locality
- Cultana Training Area used by the Australian Army
