= EMD G8 =

Class of American diesel-electric locomotive

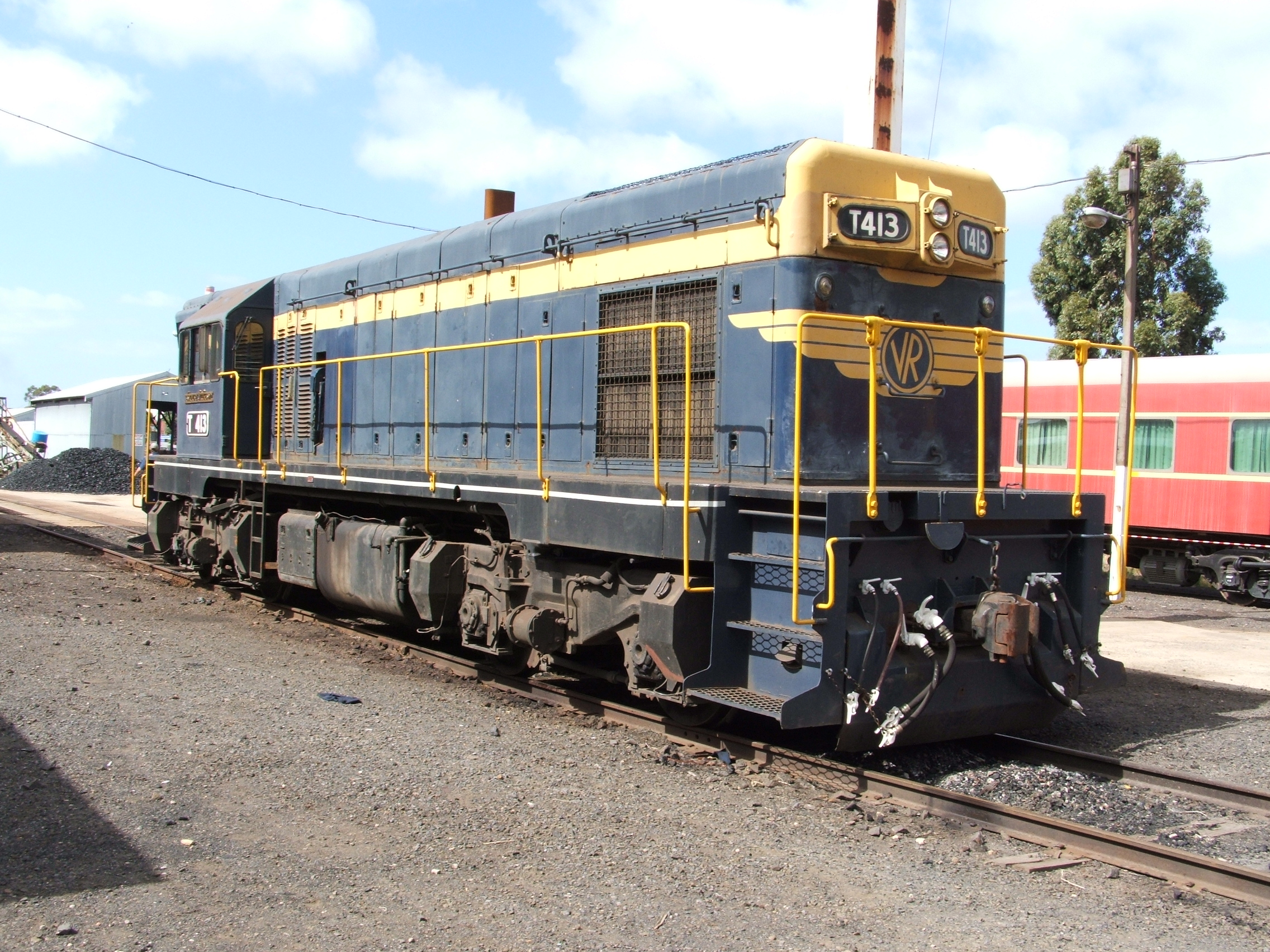
- Preserved former Victorian Railways T class G8 locomotive T 413
Type and origin
- Power type: Diesel–electric
- Builder: Electro-Motive Diesel and General Motors Diesel
- Model: G8
- Build date: 1954-1965
- Total produced: 382
Specifications
- Configuration
  - AAR: B-B/A1A-A1A (Indonesian version only)
- Gauge: 1,000 mm (3 ft 3 3/8 in) metre gauge 1,067 mm (3 ft 6 in); 1,435 mm (4 ft 8 1/2 in) standard gauge 1,600 mm (5 ft 3 in)
- Loco weight: 66.2 long tons (67.3 t; 74.1 short tons)
- Fuel capacity: 2,840 litres (750 US gal; 620 imp gal)
- Prime mover: EMD 8-567
- Cylinders: 8
- Cylinder size: 8.5 in × 10 in (216 mm × 254 mm)
Performance figures
- Power output: 875 bhp
- Tractive effort: 11,900 kg_{f} (116.7 kN)

The EMD G8 is a model of diesel–electric locomotive of which 382 were built between 1954 and 1965 for both export and domestic use. They were built by both Electro-Motive Division in the United States and by General Motors Diesel Division in Canada for use in ten countries, being equipped to operate on several different track gauges.

== Overview ==
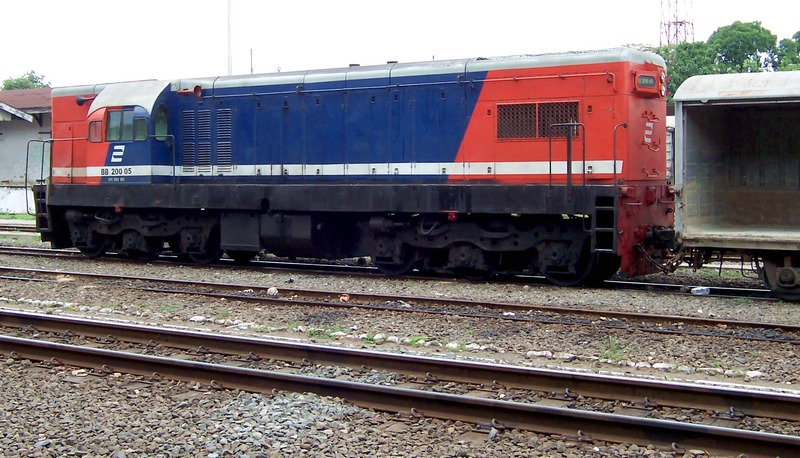
An EMD G8 series (the BB 200) in Indonesia hauled freight train in Lempuyangan railway station, Jogjakarta.

The G8 was built for use in Australia, Canada, Brazil, Cuba, Egypt, Indonesia, Iran, South Korea, Liberia, and New Zealand (DB class). The 1967 Israeli invasion of Sinai captured Egyptian G8 number 3256, which became Israel Railways number 251.

Canadian National G8 851 (originally 7671) was sold to Texas Industries sometime in the 1980s, renumbered to 208-1 (although still displaying its old 851 number in the number boxes) and repainted in an all-over yellow livery, where it was used for some time. It is currently stored on a length of track in Boulder, Colorado. In late 2021, the locomotive's current owners donated it to the Colorado, San Francisco and Northern co-operative, who are planning to restore it to working order.

The G8 was also built in Australia under licence by Clyde Engineering, with Victorian Railways purchasing a total of 89 between 1955 and 1969, with later variants including a redesigned cab, carbody and radiator (the G8B) and those built after 1967 (the G18B) equipped with the newer EMD 645 engine rather than the EMD 567 which had been fitted to the earlier locomotives. They were designated as the T class.

BHP also purchased two G8s, classed as the DE class, for service on its mine railways in the Middleback Ranges, South Australia. Both locomotives also saw service on the Coffin Bay Tramway out of Port Lincoln.

The Clyde units differed from the North American-built ones in having a shunter's refuge on the No. 2 end.

== See also ==
- List of GM-EMD locomotives
- List of GMD Locomotives
- BB 200
- BB 201
- EMD G12
