= Coffin Bay tramway =

Railway in South Australia

Coffin Bay Tramway

Overview
- Status: Closed and removed
- Owner: BHP
- Termini: Coffin Bay; Billy Lights Point, Port Lincoln

Service
- Operator(s): BHP
- Rolling stock: DE class

History
- Opened: 1966
- Closed: 1989

Technical
- Line length: 39.5 km (24.5 mi)
- Track gauge: 1,435 mm (4 ft 8 1/2 in)

The Coffin Bay Tramway was a 1,435 mm (4 ft 8 1/2 in) gauge railway located on the Eyre Peninsula of South Australia. Running for 40 kilometres from Coffin Bay to Billy Lights Point, Port Lincoln it was built and operated by BHP to carry lime sand for steelmaking at Whyalla, Port Kembla and Kwinana. Construction commenced in 1964 with the line opening in 1966.

Although built as a high standard railway line, it was known as tramway because of a law that only allowed the Government of South Australia to operate railway lines in the state.

Two EMD G12 DE class (DE08/09) locomotives were ordered from Clyde Engineering, Sydney for the line. Both entered service in November 1965 on the BHP Whyalla Tramway. Only DE08 was transferred to the Coffin Bay Tramway when it opened in 1966. It returned to Whyalla in 1968, being swapped for two smaller EMD G8 locomotives (DE01/02). A fleet of 31 wagons were built by Comeng, Bassendean.

Following storm damage to the wharf at Billy Lights Point, the line closed in 1989. The track was lifted in the early 2000s and reused on the Eyre Peninsula Railway.
