= BHP Whyalla DE class =

Class of diesel locomotives

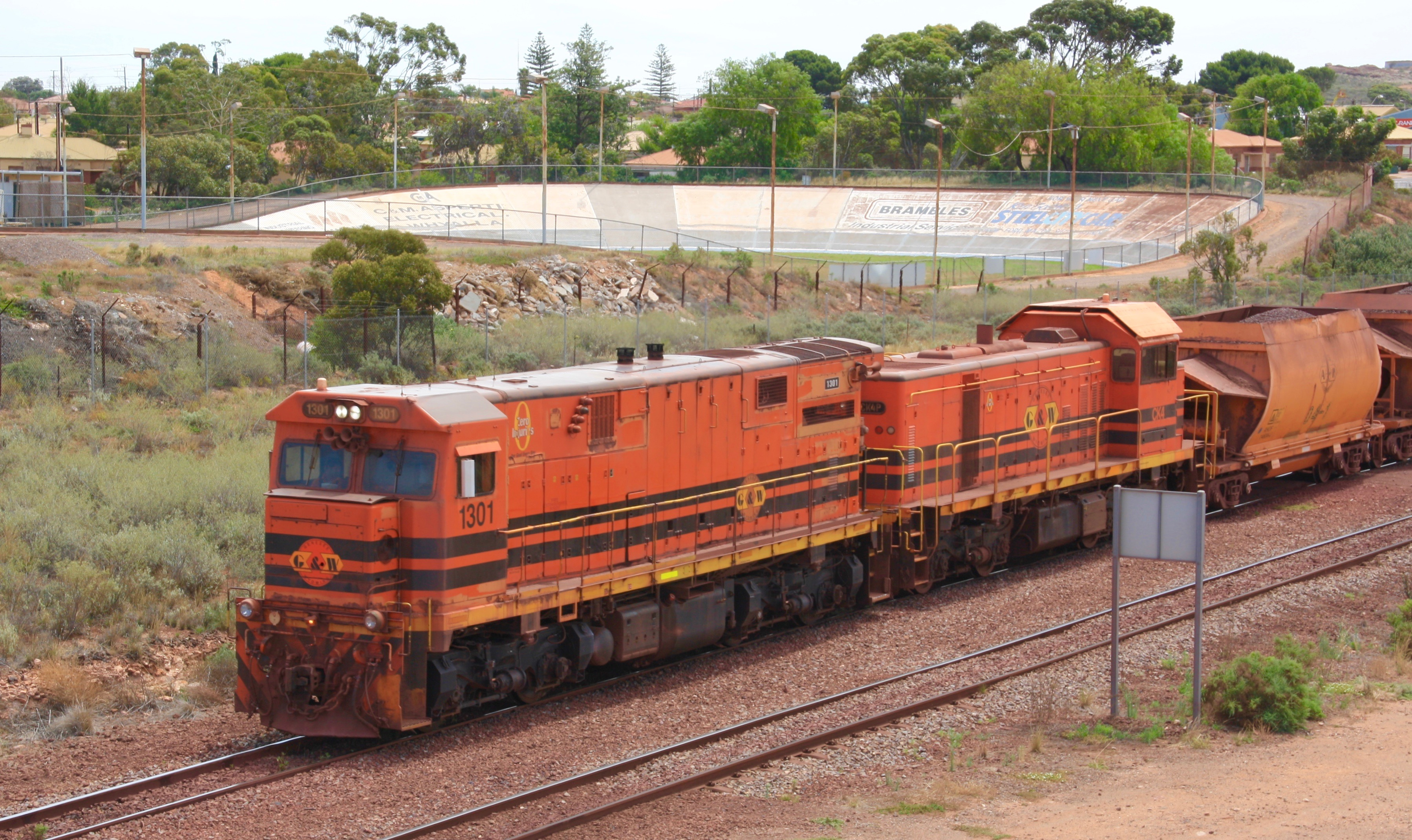
- Rebuilt DE01 (Now 1301) on a Genesee and Wyoming Australia iron ore train, 2012
Type and origin
- Power type: Diesel-electric
- Builder: Clyde Engineering; Granville
- Model: EMD G8; EMD G12
- Build date: 1956–1965
- Total produced: 9
- Rebuilder: Morrison-Knudsen Australia
- Rebuild date: 1993–1995
- Number rebuilt: 6
Specifications
- Configuration
  - UIC: Bo-Bo
- Gauge: 1,067 mm (3 ft 6 in); 1,435 mm (4 ft 8 1/2 in) standard gauge
- Fuel type: Diesel
- Prime mover: EMD 567
Career
- Operators: BHP
- Number in class: 9
- Numbers: DE01–DE09
- Delivered: 1956
- Current owner: Aurizon; SCT Logistics
- Disposition: 4 in service, 1 exported to South Africa, 3 scrapped

The BHP Whyalla DE class are a class of diesel locomotives built by Clyde Engineering, Granville for BHP between 1956 and 1965.

== History ==
In 1956, BHP purchased two Electro-Motive Diesel G8 locomotives from Clyde Engineering for use at its narrow gauge Iron Knob iron-ore quarry.

In 1956, the first of four larger Electro-Motive Diesel G12 locomotives was delivered from Clyde Engineering for use on the narrow gauge BHP Whyalla Tramway, a fifth was delivered in June 1961.

Following the construction of the 39.5 kilometre Coffin Bay Tramway standard gauge line between Proper Bay and Coffin Bay on the Eyre Peninsula, two standard gauge G12s were purchased in 1965. Following the quarry railway being closed in 1968, the G8s were both transferred to the standard gauge railway.

Between 1993 and 1995, six were remanufactured by Morrison-Knudsen Australia, at its Whyalla factory, receiving new cabs.

In 2003, the Whyalla Steelworks became part of OneSteel and the rail operations transferred to Australian Railroad Group. The DEs were renumbered as the 1250 and 1300 classes. With the split up of Australian Railroad Group in 2006, the four remaining rebuilt DE class transferred to Genesee & Wyoming Australia (later becoming One Rail Australia,) and were included in the sale of ORA's non-coal assets to Aurizon in 2022.

The sole unrebuilt G12 DE class, 1251 was transferred to QR National and was later sold to Apex Industrial, which exported the locomotive to South Africa in 2015. It is now stored as a parts source at African Rail & Traction Services, Cor Delfos, Pretoria.

During the 1990s remanufacturing program, DE02, the sole unrebuilt G8 DE class, had been stripped as a source of parts. In 2005-2006 it was rebuilt at Islington Railway Workshops for SCT Logistics for use in Parkes. As it was very similar to the Victorian Railways T class, it was renumbered T414.

== Status table ==
Locomotive	Model	In service	Owner	Status	Notes
DE01	EMD G8	Oct 1956	Aurizon	In service	Rebuilt as DE1 Feb 1994, renumbered 1301
DE02	EMD G8	Nov 1956	SCT Logistics	In service	Rebuilt by Islington Railway Workshops as T414
DE03	EMD G12	Nov 1956	Aurizon	In service	Rebuilt as DE3 Sep 1994, renumbered 1302
DE04	EMD G12	Dec 1956	Genesee & Wyoming Australia	In service	Rebuilt as DE4 Mar 1995, renumbered 1303
DE05	EMD G12	May 1957	African Rail & Traction Services	Stored	Renumbered 1251
DE06	EMD G12	Aug 1957	BHP	Scrapped Nov 1996	
DE07	EMD G12	Jun 1961	Aurizon	In service	Rebuilt as DE7 Mar 1994, renumbered 1304
DE08	EMD G12	Nov 1965	Australian Railroad Group	Scrapped Oct 2002	Rebuilt as DE8 May 1994, destroyed in accident Apr 2002
DE09	EMD G12	Dec 1965	Australian Railroad Group	Scrapped Oct 2002	Rebuilt as DE9 May 1993, destroyed in accident Apr 2002
