= Point Lowly Lighthouse =

Point Lowly lighthouse
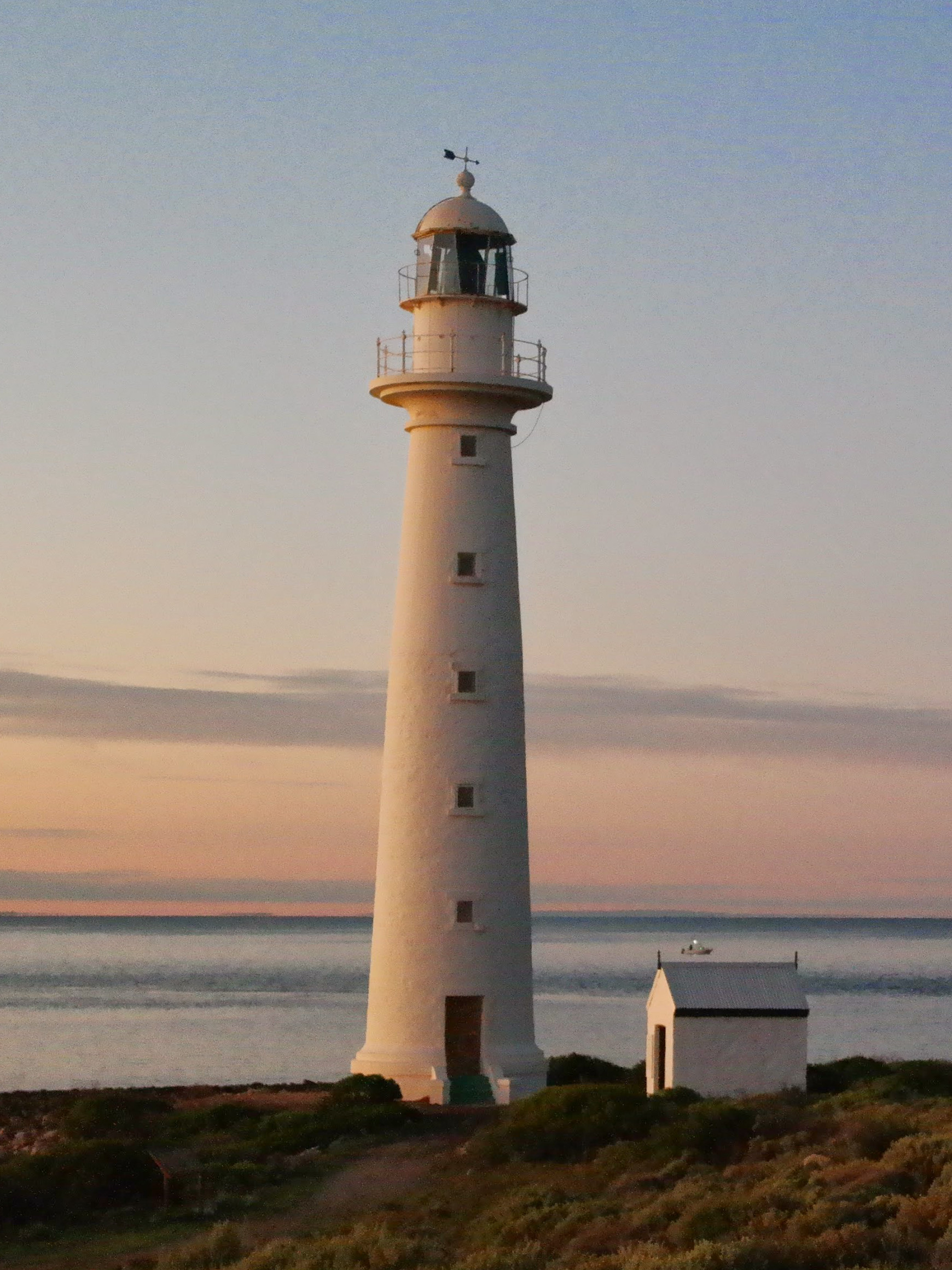
- Point Lowly Lighthouse
- Location: Point Lowly; Eyre Peninsula; South Australia; Australia
- Coordinates: 32°59′59.1″S 137°47′08.3″E

Tower
- Constructed: 1883
- Construction: sandstone tower
- Automated: 1973
- Height: 22.8 metres (75 ft)
- Shape: conical tower with double balcony and lantern
- Markings: white tower and lantern
- Power source: mains electricity
- Operator: City of Whyalla
- Heritage: state heritage place since 15 December 1994.

Light
- Deactivated: 1993-1995; 2009-2010
- Focal height: 23 metres (75 ft)
- Intensity: 1,000,000 cd
- Range: 26 nautical miles (48 km; 30 mi)
- Characteristic: Fl (8) W 40s.

The Point Lowly lighthouse was constructed in 1883 to guide ships safely through Spencer Gulf en route to Port Augusta and Port Pirie in South Australia. It was upgraded several times before being deactivated in 1993. It was reactivated in 1995 and is a tourist attraction for the Whyalla area and an icon of the Point Lowly area.

== History ==
The lighthouse at Point Lowly was constructed in 1883 to guide ships traversing Spencer Gulf, en route to the northern ports of Port Augusta and Port Pirie. The lighthouse and its cottages pre-date the establishment of Whyalla and are the oldest European heritage structures in the Whyalla area.

The original tower was 15 metres in height and was made from local sandstone. The optical apparatus had an eight side catadioptric lens which revolved once every 80 seconds and gave a 2-second flash every 10 seconds. Supplies were brought to the lighthouse by boat from Port Pirie on the eastern shore of Spencer Gulf.

The structure was raised by 7.6 metres to its current height in 1909. The original mineral-oil fueled wick burner light was replaced by a kerosene vaporising light unit during the upgrade.

In 1973, the light was demanned. This followed the installation of a battery-powered Stone Chance Power Beam Beacon on the balcony.

In 1979, the lens and lamp were upgraded and the light was connected to mains electricity.

In 1980, it was listed on the now-defunct Register of the National Estate.

In 1983, the lighthouse and cottages received heritage listing.

In 1993, the Australian Maritime Safety Authority deemed the light to be unnecessary and the light was deactivated.

In 1994, the lighthouse and its attendance buildings and 2.14 hectares (5.3 acres) of land has been listed as a state heritage place on the South Australian Heritage Register since 11 November 1999.

In 1995, the light was reactivated after community appeal and remains under the control of the local government area of the City of Whyalla.

== Current use ==
The Point Lowly Lighthouse is a popular icon of the upper Spencer Gulf region. It features in tourism literature, on billboards and was adopted as a logo by the community action group, Save Point Lowly.

A 2.14 hectares (5.3 acres) reserve which includes the lighthouse, cottages and associated structures has been listed on the South Australian Heritage Places database since 15 December 1994. Its significance is reported as follows:

The Point Lowly Lightstation is important for its association with the maritime history of South Australia in the 1880s, a time when several lighthouses were built to protect increasing shipping traffic in the Colony's waters. The lighthouse is also associated with the development of Port Pirie, Whyalla and BHP's mining operations in the area. Originally constructed of stone in 1883, the lighthouse was extended in height in 1908. The use of concrete in this extension represents both an early use of concrete and the first use of structural concrete in a lighthouse in South Australia. (HSA: SL 6/99)

The lighthouse cottages are available as rental accommodation, sleep up to 29 people and are managed by Whyalla City Council. VisitorsGuide.com.au They are often used by recreational divers and marine scientists who visit the region's cuttlefish aggregation each winter. Flinders University Underwater Club Between July and September 2014, the Whyalla City Council will be conducting an assessment of the buildings' condition, restoration needs, costs, resource and operating requirements. The council will investigate options to incorporate the cottages into a single business unit for visitation, tourism, education and cultural services and will consider potential outsourcing.

== See also ==
- List of lighthouses in Australia
