= False Bay (disambiguation) =

False Bay is a bay of the Atlantic Ocean near Cape Town, South Africa.

False Bay can also refer to:

- False Bay (Livingston Island) on Livingston Island in the South Shetland Islands
- False Bay, South Australia, a bay in South Australia
- False Bay, South Australia (locality), a locality in South Australia
- False Bay Park in iSimangaliso Wetland Park, KwaZulu-Natal, South Africa
- the former name of Allison Harbour on the Central Coast of British Columbia
- the former name of Lyall Bay in Wellington, New Zealand
- the former name of Mission Bay (San Diego) in San Diego, California
- the name recorded for the Kaipara Harbour by Captain Cook on his first voyage to New Zealand
