= False Bay, South Australia (locality) =

False Bay South Australia
- Coordinates: 32°56′35″S 137°39′31″E
- Population: 0 (SAL 2021)
- Established: 2010
- Postcode(s): 5601
- Time zone: ACST (UTC+9:30)
  - Summer (DST): ACST (UTC+10:30)
- LGA(s): City of Whyalla; Pastoral Unincorporated Area
- State electorate(s): Giles
- Federal division(s): Grey
Mean max temp	Mean min temp	Annual rainfall
23.8 °C; 75 °F	11.5 °C; 53 °F	267.1 mm 10.5 in
Localities around False Bay:
Whyalla Barson	Whyalla Barson; Cultana	Cultana
Whyalla Barson	False Bay	Port Bonython
Whyalla Barson		Spencer Gulf
- Footnotes: Adjoioning localities

False Bay is a locality in South Australia on the north east corner of Eyre Peninsula located north of the city of Whyalla overlooking the bay in Spencer Gulf known as False Bay.

The locality's name is derived from this bay. The locality was first established in 2010 for a "long established name".

False Bay is located within the federal Division of Grey, the state electoral district of Giles and is partly within the local government area of the City of Whyalla and the Pastoral Unincorporated Area of South Australia.

The land within False Bay which is part of the City of Whyalla jurisdiction is zoned as "coastal conservation" while land within the Pastoral Unincorporated Area is zoned as "remote areas", a zoning type concerned with balancing development with conservation needs, in response to the proximity of industrial facilities such as the Whyalla Steelworks to "coastal environments, swamps and waterways" both within and adjoining the locality.

False Bay is within the extent of the wetland of national importance known as "Upper Spencer Gulf" which includes mangrove and samphire areas from near Whyalla on the west side of Spencer Gulf to Port Broughton on the Gulf's east coast.

== See also ==
- False Bay (disambiguation)
- List of cities and towns in South Australia
