= Tony Bramley =

South Australian scuba diver and environmentalist

Tony Bramley is a South Australian scuba diver and environmentalist who has campaigned for the protection of the Australian giant cuttlefish aggregation of northern Spencer Gulf since it was heavily fished in the late 1990s.

== Career ==
Since 1998 Tony Bramley has promoted marine eco-tourism in the upper Spencer Gulf region, particularly on the rocky inshore reefs of the Point Lowly peninsula, where the cuttlefish gather to breed between May and August each year. As the proprietor of Whyalla Diving Services, Bramley manages a crew of commercial divers and also provisions visiting tourists and marine scientists who visit the region. Bramley has lived in Whyalla since 1979. He grew up in Edithburgh on Yorke Peninsula, and has spent most of his life on and in the waters of South Australia's two gulfs. Occasionally, Bramley has been involved in animal rescue operations, and once freed a whale which had become entangled in netting.
