= St Kilda salt fields brine spill =

Ongoing environmental disaster in South Australia

Coordinates: 34°44′42″S 138°32′24″E

The St Kilda saltfields brine spill is an ongoing environmental disaster occurring since late 2020 in St Kilda, South Australia, around 30 km (19 mi) north of Adelaide. Former salt production ponds have been leaking brine into adjacent wetlands causing death and distress to mangroves, the salt marsh, and intertidal ecological communities of Barker Inlet.

== Impact ==
In late 2020, brine leaking from former salt production ponds managed by the private company, Buckland Dry Creek Pty Ltd (a subsidiary of Adelaide Resource Recovery Pty Ltd) caused damage to adjacent natural vegetation. The brine was seeping from ponds which had cracked and compromised gypsum linings. It was first publicly reported that 10 hectares of mangroves had died and 35 hectares of salt marsh had been impacted. As of 2021, the problem has spread and worsened over an impact area exceeding 190 hectares. This has resulted in die-back and distress to mature forests of the grey mangrove, Avicennia marina, and associated salt marsh habitats. The brine renders life in the shallow estuarine environment impossible for most marine organisms and the loss of vegetation has reduced habitat for many birds and insects. This is expected to reduce the availability of food for migratory shorebirds and resident species. Further harm can be reduced if brine is pumped out of the ponds, but pure sodium chloride is becoming an increasing problem as it crystallizes across the impact zone. The spill is a candidate for South Australia's worst marine environmental disaster, second only to the 1992 Port Bonython oil spill until the full extent of the impact is known.

== Location ==
The St Kilda salt fields lie to the north of Barker Inlet in South Australia. The impacted area includes habitats adjacent to the salt fields and is visible from the St Kilda mangrove boardwalk which is a popular tourist attraction and site for environmental education. The wider impact area includes the estuaries of the Helps Road drainage and Little Para River.

== Response ==
Former state Minister for the Environment, David Speirs described the removal of brine from the ponds as "incredibly tricky" and said that the government was working with Buckland Dry Creek (BDC) to fix the problem as quickly as possible. The Department for Energy and Mining (DEM) is the regulator responsible for the site, and told the ABC that BDC had pumped brine against their "holding pattern" directions. The Department created a webpage providing updates on the incident and provides images, maps and background information. The updates continue on a new DEM webpage under the Malinauskas government.

Citizens and independent experts undertook aerial surveys and established baseline data to track and measure loss and recovery in the areas impacted. A vigil in support of the mangroves and calling for affirmative action from the Government was held on the steps of the South Australian parliament on World Wetlands Day, 2 February 2021. Speakers included parliamentarians from the Labor and Greens parties, including Susan Close, Peter Malinauskas, and Mark Parnell, who were variously critical of the government response. The St Kilda Mangrove Alliance, a group including members of the local community, scientists, and non-government organisations, formed in order to campaign for action to remediate the damage.

In December 2024 it was announced that a civil settlement had been agreed between the Environmental Protection Authority (EPA) and BDC, which includes A$100,000 towards an environmental monitoring study to be conducted over the following three years.
