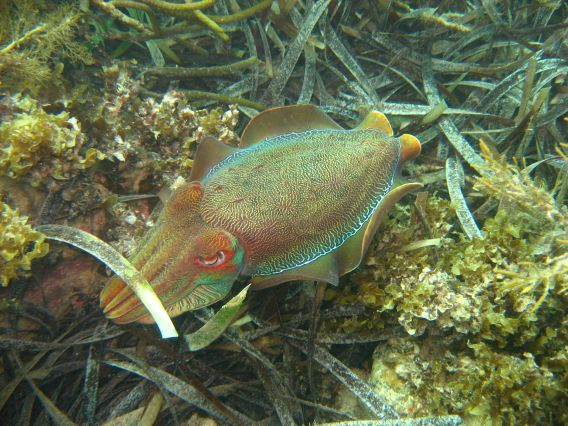
- Giant cuttlefish from Whyalla, South Australia

Conservation status
- Near Threatened (IUCN 3.1)

Scientific classification
- Kingdom: Animalia
- Phylum: Mollusca
- Class: Cephalopoda
- Order: Sepiida
- Family: Sepiidae
- Genus: Ascarosepion
- Species: A. apama

Binomial name
- Ascarosepion apama (Gray, 1849)
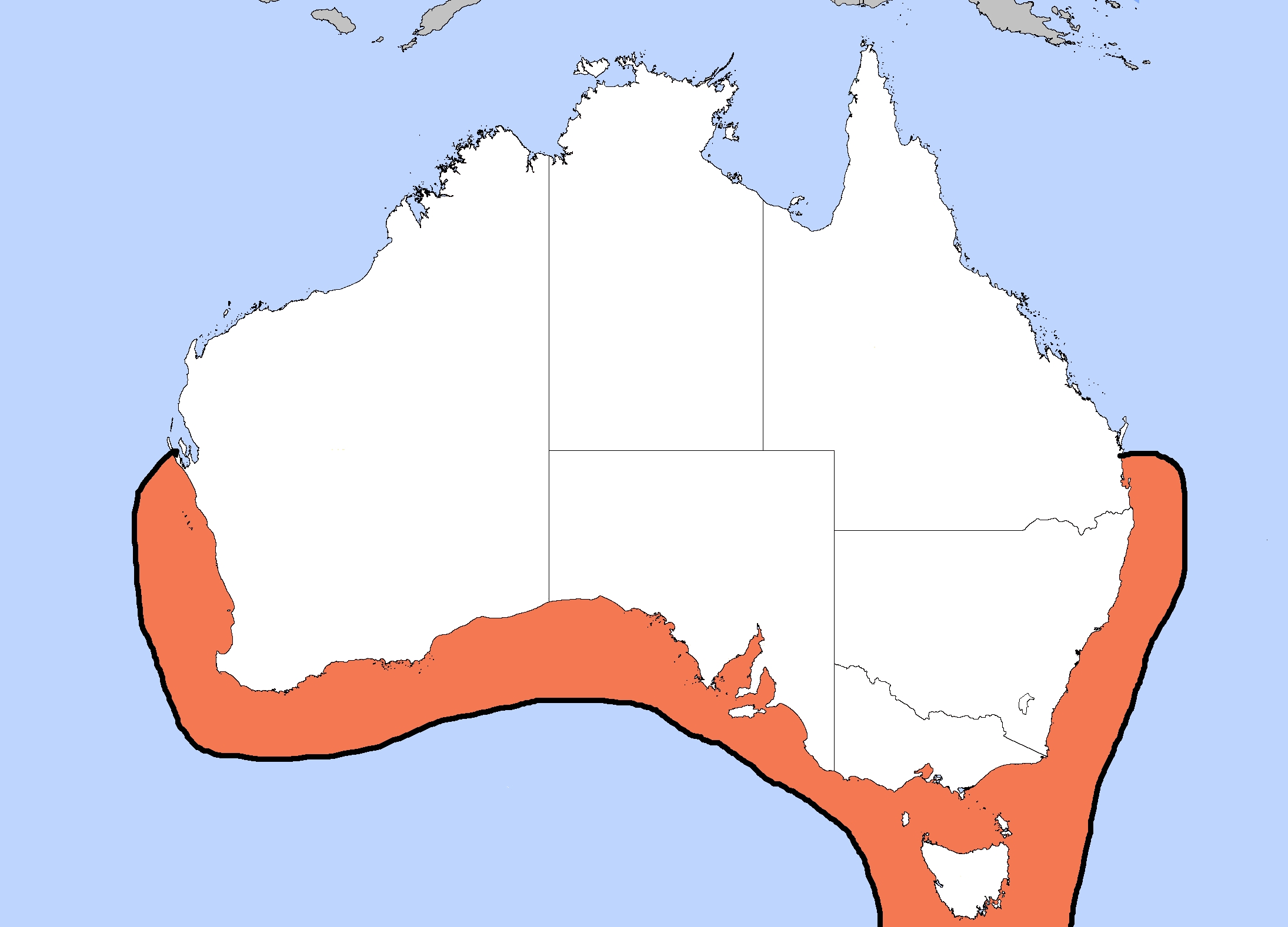
- Distribution of Ascarosepion apama

Synonyms
- Sepia apama Gray, 1849; Sepia palmata Owen, 1881; Lophosepion apama Rochebrune, 1884; Amplisepia verreauni Iredale, 1926; Amplisepia parysatis Iredale, 1954

= Giant cuttlefish =

Species of cephalopod

The giant cuttlefish (Ascarosepion apama), also known as the Australian giant cuttlefish, is the world's largest cuttlefish species, growing to 50 cm (20 in) in mantle length and up to 100 cm (39 in) in total length (that is, including outstretched tentacles). They can weigh over 10.5 kg (23 lb). Like all cuttlefish species, the giant cuttlefish has eight arms and two feeding tentacles, as well as blue blood and three hearts. Using cells known as chromatophores, the cuttlefish can put on spectacular displays, changing colour in an instant. The giant cuttlefish is native to temperate and subtropical waters of Australia, from Brisbane in Queensland to Shark Bay in Western Australia and Tasmania to the south. It occurs on rocky reefs, seagrass beds, and sand and mud seafloor to a depth of 100 m (330 ft). The genetically distinct population in the Upper Spencer Gulf is the most studied population, and has become a tourist attraction.

== Physiology and biochemistry ==
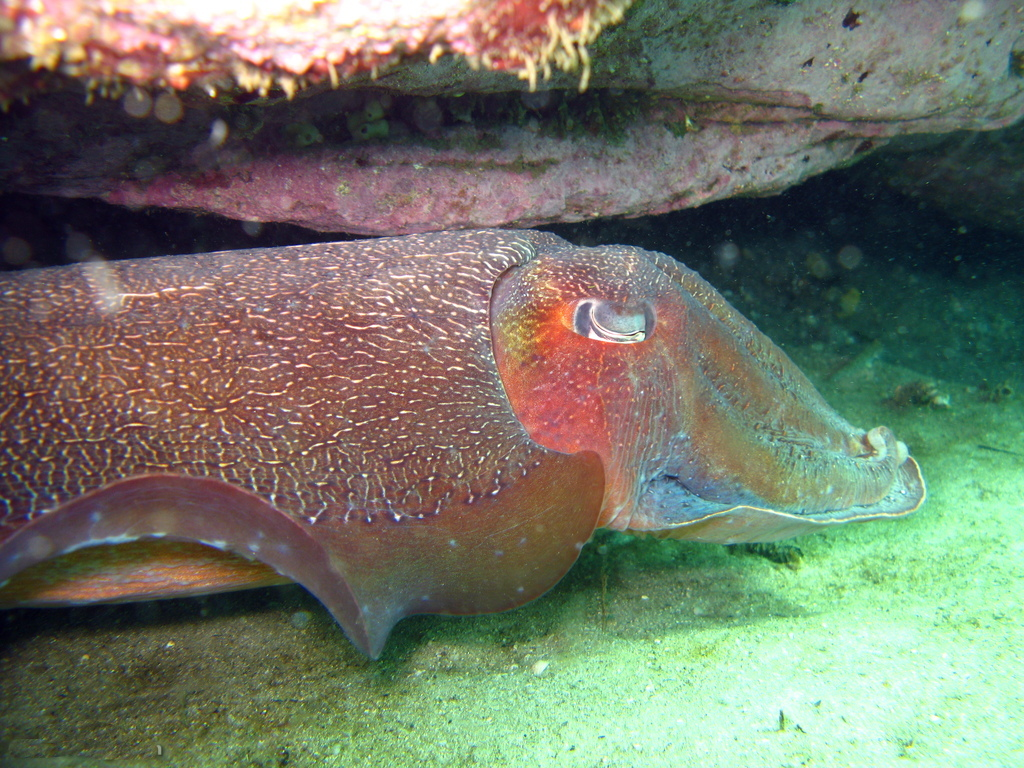
Individual from Fairy Bower, Manly, New South Wales

Ascarosepion apama, commonly known as giant cuttlefish or Australian giant cuttlefish, is the largest species of cuttlefish in the world, reaching 50 cm (20 in) in mantle length and up to 100 cm (39 in) in total length (total length meaning the whole length of the body including outstretched tentacles). Giant cuttlefish can weigh over 10.5 kg (23 lb). They have eight arms and two feeding tentacles, as well as blue blood and three hearts, as do all species of cuttlefish.

Genetic studies have shown that little, if any, interbreeding occurs between giant cuttlefish populations. While some genetic divergence is seen, the various populations are not considered taxonomically distinct and are commonly referred to by their location, e.g. Sepia apama upper Spencer Gulf population. The upper Spencer Gulf population is unique in that a permanent salinity gradient in the Spencer Gulf may physiologically exclude other populations from the zone occupied by the upper Spencer Gulf population. This population may in fact be a separate species, as it does show some hallmarks, such as genetic separation, differences in morphology, and different patterns of sexual dimorphism from adjacent populations.

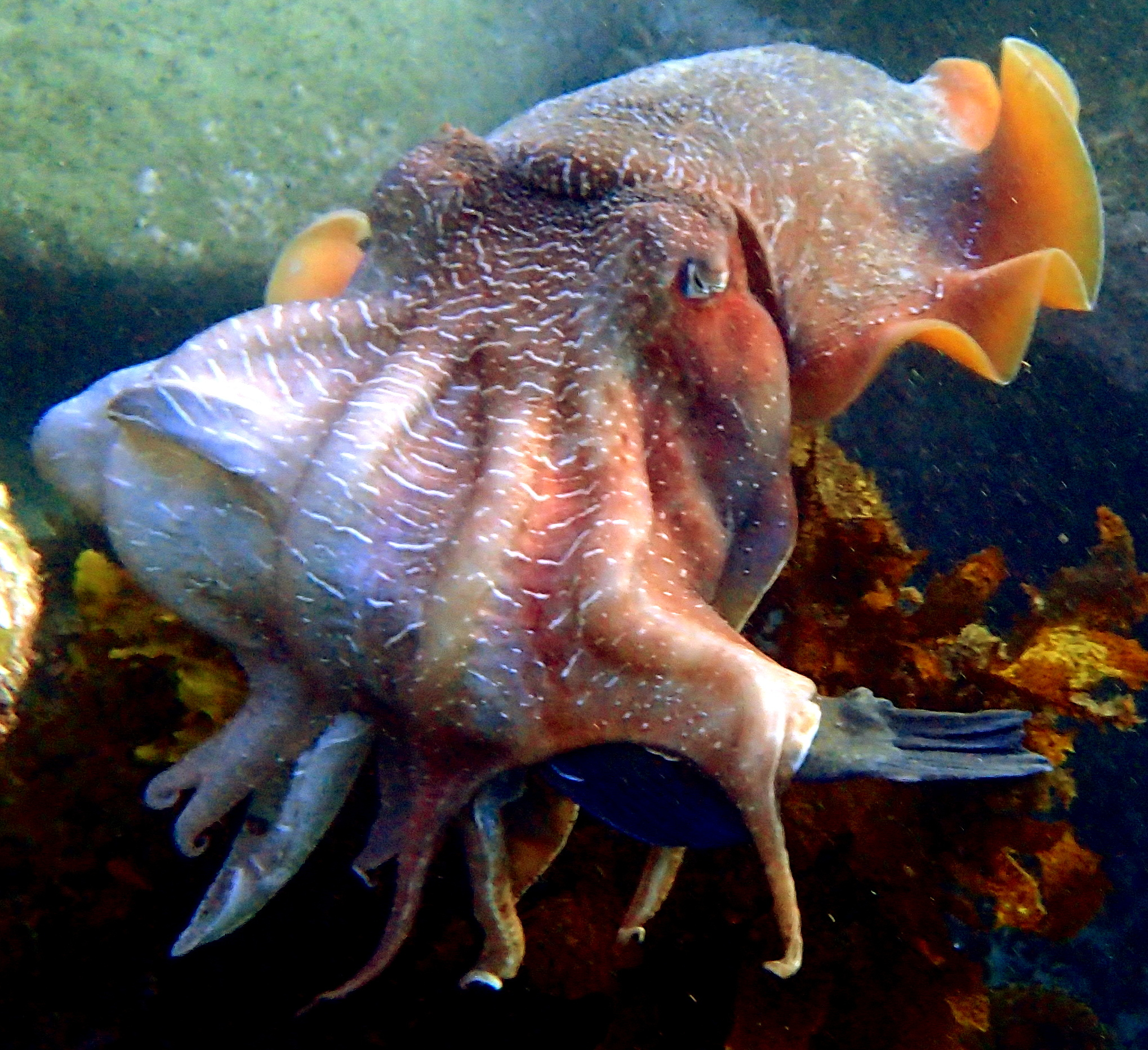
Eating an eastern blue groper while making a coincident disruptive pattern

Giant cuttlefish are a neritic demersal species. They are carnivorous, opportunistic, and voracious predators that feed predominantly on crustaceans and fish. Using neurally controlled cells known as chromatophore organs (red to yellow), iridophores (iridescent: spans the entire visible spectrum from blue to near-IR) and leucophores (white), the cuttlefish can put on spectacular displays, changing colour and patterns in a fraction of a second. Located in three layers under the skin, leucophores make up the bottom layer, with chromatophores the outermost. By selective blocking, the three layers work together to produce polarised patterns. Unlike those in most animals, cuttlefish iridophores are physiologically active; they can change their reflectivity, and the degree of polarisation can also be controlled. Cuttlefish are colourblind; however, the photoreceptors of cuttlefish eyes are arranged in a way that gives them the ability to see the linear polarisation of light. While the mantis shrimp is the only creature known to have true polarisation vision, cephalopods may also. Because the optic lobes of cuttlefish are larger than any other region of the brain and their skin produces polarised reflective patterns, they may communicate through this visual system. By raising elaborate papillae on their skin, S. apama squid can change the shape and the texture of their skin to imitate rock, sand, or seaweed. A bioenergetics study found that the giant cuttlefish is primarily diurnal and has a small home range (90–550 m or 300–1,800 ft) over short recording periods while travelling large distances to breed. They are able to channel most of their energy directly into growth because they spend 95% of the day resting, suggesting bioenergetics more like that of an octopus than a squid. Very little time is spent foraging (3.7% during the day and 2.1% at night); most of their time is spent resting and hiding in crevices from predators. The exception to this behavioral routine is the mass spawning aggregation, where cuttlefish are far more active during the days or weeks that they spend there.

== Habitat ==
The giant cuttlefish is native to temperate and subtropical waters of Australia, from Brisbane in Queensland to Shark Bay in Western Australia and Tasmania to the south. It occurs on rocky reefs, seagrass beds, and sand and mud seafloor to a depth of 100 m (330 ft).

== Lifecycle and reproduction ==
Giant cuttlefish live for one to two years. Breeding takes place with the onset of the southern winter. Males abandon their normal cryptic colouring and set out to dazzle the females by adopting rapidly changing bright colours and striking patterns. Females are polyandrous, and collaborative research indicates the tendency for females to reproduce using male genetic material deposited in spermatangia more favorably than in sperm receptacles directly. Females then attach their eggs to the undersides of rocks in caves or crevices, where they hatch within three to five months. A. apama is semelparous, and death follows shortly after a single mating cycle and laying of eggs that will spawn the next generation. A. apama has poor anaerobic capability compared to most aquatic invertebrates and a lack of food leads to catabolism. Stomach-content analysis indicates fasting during the breeding season, and as A. apama can catabolise no more than 50% of its body weight, it slowly loses physical condition as the season progresses and eventually dies. Throughout their range, these cephalopods breed in pairs or small groups, laying eggs in suitable caves or rock crevices. Loose spawning aggregations can form, but rarely exceed 10 animals in any one location, with one known exception; hundreds of thousands aggregate along rocky reefs between Whyalla and Point Lowly in the Upper Spencer Gulf. While surveys suggest that juveniles leave these spawning grounds after hatching, nothing is known of their subsequent movement or lifestyle strategies as a juvenile. Adults return to the aggregation site the following winter, or may delay their return by an additional year.

== Predators ==
The Australian giant cuttlefish is preyed upon by a variety of marine predators. In South Australia's Spencer Gulf, Indo-Pacific bottlenose dolphins have been observed using a specialized technique to remove the ink and cuttlebone before consuming the cuttlefish.

Long-nosed fur seals (Arctocephalus forsteri) are also known predators, and various cephalopods—including cuttlefish—are taken by yellowtail kingfish (Seriola lalandi).

The predation of cephalopods by yellowtail kingfish has raised ecological concerns in Spencer Gulf, particularly regarding the potential impact of aquaculture escapees on wild species, including the giant Australian cuttlefish and their eggs.

== Conservation status ==
In 2009 the species was listed as "near threatened" on the IUCN Red List of Threatened Species due to an observed declining trend at that time.

== Upper Spencer Gulf population ==
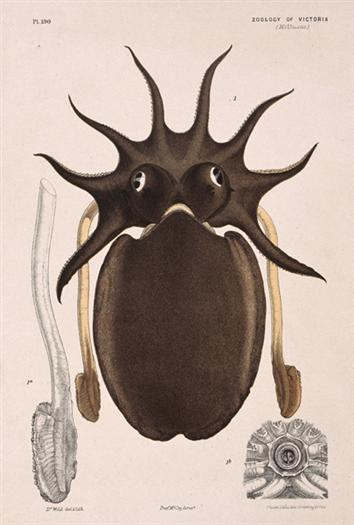
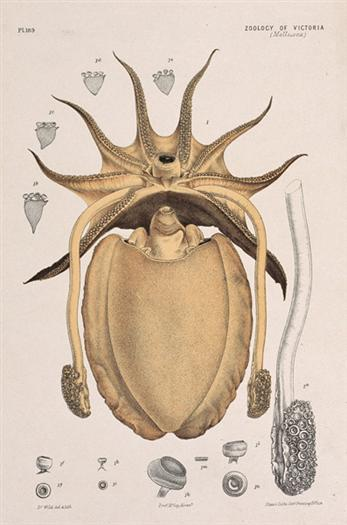
Dorsal (left) and ventral views of A. apama: lithographic proofs from Prodromus of the Zoology of Victoria by John James Wild

Unpublished scientific data indicated that several genetically distinct populations of giant cuttlefish are living in Australian waters. Discovered by divers in the late 1990s, the upper Spencer Gulf population is the best studied, largely because it is the world's only known mass cuttlefish-spawning aggregation. It has also become a popular ecotourism attraction for divers and snorkelers.

Hundreds of thousands of giant cuttlefish gather on subtidal reefs around Point Lowly near Whyalla between May and August. While outside of the breeding season, the sex ratio is one to one, Spencer Gulf males outnumber females by up to 11 to one in the spawning aggregation. If this is due to fewer females taking part or to males breeding for a longer period of time than females is not known. With densities of one cuttlefish per square metre (0.093 cuttlefish per square foot), covering about 61 hectares (150 acres), the sheer numbers of giant cuttlefish make this breeding aggregation unique in the world. As the cuttlefish are oblivious to divers while spawning, they are now a major regional tourist attraction for divers from around the world. Professor Roger Hanlon of the Woods Hole Oceanographic Institution has called the breeding aggregation "the premier marine attraction on the planet."

The upper Spencer Gulf population displays two alternative lifecycles in both sexes (growth pattern polymorphism). The first involves rapid growth with maturity reached in seven to eight months with small adults returning to spawn in the first year. The second involves slow growth with maturity reached in two years, with large adults returning to spawn in the second year. The upper Spencer Gulf population displays reproductive behaviours unique to this population, possibly as a result of the high spawning densities. Large males defend females and egg-laying sites, while small males, "sneakers" mimic female colouring and form to gain access to the females being protected by the dominant males, which are extremely territorial. Male genetic material is deposited in sperm receptacles directly. The females, which potentially lay hundreds of eggs, extract one egg at a time and fertilise it by passing it over the sperm receptacle before attaching it to the underside of a rock at depths of 2 to 5 m (6 ft 7 in to 16 ft 5 in).

=== Conservation ===
Giant cuttlefish, short video taken off Point Lowly, SA

An unsuccessful application to list this population of giant cuttlefish as a threatened species under Australian law was made during the government's consideration of BHP Billiton's Olympic Dam mine expansion project. The application was made following an observed and unexplained population decline and public concerns about future risks posed by industrial pollution. On 2 February 2011, the Australian government's Threatened Species Scientific Committee ruled that the species was not eligible for listing, as the affected population was not taxonomically distinct from the rest of the species for the purposes of the act. Further scientific work has determined the cuttlefish of northern Spencer Gulf to be genetically distinct from other giant cuttlefish populations in Australian waters, although the results remain unpublished.

The Upper Spencer Gulf Marine Park covers a large area, within which lies several sanctuary zones, including the Cuttlefish Coast Sanctuary Zone, which was inscribed on the National Heritage List on 24 February 2023.

=== Commercial fishing ===
Prior to the mid-1990s, the upper Spencer Gulf population was fished for snapper bait, with annual catches of around 4 tonnes (4,000 cuttlefish). During the 1995 and 1996 spawning seasons, commercial fishing of the spawning grounds harvested around 200 tonnes annually. Overexploitation was recognised after 245 tonnes were harvested in 1997, leading to 50% of the grounds being closed to commercial fishing in 1998. Despite half of the grounds being closed, commercial fishers took 109 tonnes in 1998 (about half of the estimated biomass) before dropping to 3.7 tonnes in 1999. The catch data for 2000 to 2005 were initially withheld citing commercial confidentiality.

Catch data for the South Australian cuttlefish fishery are reported in annual reports of the Marine Scalefish Fishery, published by SARDI. The pre-2014 data are graphed below. From its establishment in 1987 to the financial year ending June 1992, the fishery caught less than 3 tonnes per annum.

South Australian cuttlefish fishery – Targeted commercial catch
Financial Year	Tonnes caught
1992–93	3
1993–94	7
1994–95	35
1995–96	71
1996–97	263
1997–98	170
1998–99	15
1999–00	16
2000–01	19
2001–02	27
2002–03	11
2003–04	6
2004–05	9
2005–06	8
2006–07	11
2007–08	6
2008–09	4
2009–10	10
2010–11	5
2011–12	3
2012–13	4
2013–14	2

=== Population decline ===
Surveys indicated that the cuttlefish biomass remained stable from 1998 to 2001 as commercial fishing pressure was reduced by regulation. A survey in 2005 revealed a 34% decrease in biomass since 2001 that was attributed to natural variability and illegal fishing during the peak spawning period. The closure was subsequently expanded to the entire spawning grounds, and anecdotal observations suggested increased numbers in 2006 and 2007; however, a new survey in 2008 found the biomass had decreased a further 17%.

In 2011, an estimated 33% of the 2010 population had returned to breed, fewer than 80,000 cuttlefish. Beginning in May, the cuttlefish leave deep water and migrate along coastal reefs to reach their spawning grounds. Local fishermen claimed that a small "finger of land" near Point Lowly extends outside the exclusion zone and that commercial fishers have been targeting the area, intercepting the squid before they can reach the spawning grounds. Being semelparous breeders, ecologist Bronwyn Gillanders believed the cuttlefish were in danger, stating that determining whether this is a natural phenomenon or something else is difficult, and that the cause requires more research.

In 2012, the number of cuttlefish that returned to the spawning ground again dropped again. A cross-government Cuttlefish Working Group was established and recommended investigating broader ecological factors. Tour guide Tony Bramley, who had been taking divers to view the spawning grounds since they were discovered, stated, "It's heartbreaking, when you look at what's left ... [once] there were so many animals you couldn't land on the bottom, you had to push them aside."

The Conservation Council of South Australia, which believes the population to be a separate species based on unpublished scientific data, warned that the Spencer Gulf cuttlefish faced possible extinction within two or three years if nothing was done to better protect them. The state government working group recommended an immediate ban on fishing for the cuttlefish; however, this was rejected by the state cabinet on 3 September with Fisheries Minister Gail Gago stating, "There is no strong evidence to suggest that fishing is impacting on the giant cuttlefish, therefore, further closures would be ineffective."

On 28 March 2013, the state government introduced a temporary ban on fishing for cuttlefish in the northern Spencer Gulf for the 2013 breeding season. Fisheries Minister Gago announced that research into the reasons behind the 90% decline in the cuttlefish population had ruled out commercial fishing as a cause, but was otherwise inconclusive, and that further areas of Spencer Gulf would be closed in 2014. The population continued its decline, reaching the lowest numbers on record in 2013.

In 2014, the cuttlefish population showed first signs of potential recovery, after 15 years of an overall trend of decline. Numbers increased again in 2015 confirming this trend. As of 2021, the population has recovered to an estimated population exceeding 240,000 animals.

The fishing ban for the whole of northern Spencer Gulf was extended until 2020, prohibiting their capture in all Spencer Gulf waters north of Wallaroo and Arno Bay. In 2020 the closed area rolled back to the same limited spatial closure that was in place in 2012, encompassing the waters of False Bay, from Whyalla to Point Lowly and extending northwards towards the Point Lowly North marina.

==== Population estimates ====
Standardised annual population estimates (SARDI)
Year	Population estimate
1999	168,497
2000	167,584
2001	172,544
2002	0
2003	0
2004	0
2005	124,867
2006	0
2007	0
2008	75,173
2009	123,105
2010	104,805
2011	38,373
2012	18,531
2013	13,492
2014	57,317
2015	130,771
2016	177,091
2017	127,992

- Figure '0' is used to represent years in which surveys did not occur, and no estimation was made.
- 1999–2017 data sourced from SARDI
- Approximate 2016 population estimate was published in the Whyalla News and approximate 2017 numbers were first published by PIRSA. A slightly larger estimate for the 2017 season was published in 2018 by the ABC (reflected in the graph).

=== Effect of local industrialisation ===
The mass aggregation sites of Upper Spencer Gulf are proximate to a number of industrial pollution sources, and prospective sites for further development. As of 2021, operations that publicly report their pollution discharges to the sea in a controlled and measured manner include the Whyalla Steelworks, the Port Pirie lead smelter owned and operated by Nyrstar. The pollutants of primary concern to cuttlefish recruitment are changes of salinity (due to discharges from desalination plants) and nutrient enrichment, discharged by the steelworks, lead smelter, municipal wastewater treatment plants and farming of yellowtail kingfish.

==== Nutrient enrichment ====
Northern Spencer Gulf is an oligotrophic inverse estuary with naturally low levels of nutrients cycling through it. A potential exists for anthropogenic nutrient pollution to cause eutrophication in the region with associated ecological impacts to the cuttlefish and wider ecology. A long-term industrial nutrient pollution source exists to the west of the cuttlefish breeding reef at the Whyalla Steelworks. There, ammonia, a byproduct of its coking process for steel-making, and is discharged into Spencer Gulf via reed-beds and settling ponds. North of the cuttlefish aggregation, sea cage farming of yellowtail kingfish occurred commercially from the late 1990s until 2011. Fish farming is another nutrient pollution source, as uneaten feed and fish waste enter the water column and sediment. Concerns have been raised about an observed correlation between fish farming intensification, fish mortalities and the decline and eventual recovery of the giant Australian cuttlefish after fish farming ceased in upper Spencer Gulf.

==== Hydrocarbon pollution ====
In 1984, before the spawning grounds were discovered, Santos built a hydrocarbon processing plant at adjoining Port Bonython. Some concern exists over the possible impact of the plant on the cuttlefish population and two major contamination events have happened at the associated port and refinery. Santos denies that groundwater contamination detected in the late 2000s spread off-site, but the SA EPA said hydrocarbons had migrated through the rock strata beyond the plant and the barrier trench built by Santos. Santos now provides funding for cuttlefish research. The other incident was the 1992 Port Bonython oil spill, whereby 300 tonnes of bunker C crude oil spilled into the sea after a tugboat pierced its hull during berthing. The effects of these events on the local population of A. apama are unknown.

==== Seawater desalination ====
The dispersal of brine from seawater desalination plant effluent streams has concerned scientists and the Whyalla community. During the mid-to-late 2000s, mining and energy company BHP Billiton developed plans to build a seawater desalination plant at Point Lowly to supply fresh water to the Olympic Dam mine. The plant, located within 200 m (660 ft) of the breeding grounds, would release around 120 ML (32,000,000 US gal) of brine (46–60 ppt) into the area each day. As cuttlefish embryos underdevelop and die off as salinity levels rise (optimal range 28–38 ppt, 100% mortality at 50 ppt), public opposition to the proposed plant was considerable because of the possible environmental impacts. The plan was approved in 2011, but was not constructed and was later officially abandoned. Since that time, two new, smaller scale seawater desalination plants have been commissioned and discharge brine into the gulf: one at the Whyalla Steelworks and another at Sundrop Farms, south of Port Augusta.

In 2022, BHP sought to increase its water supply via the Northern Water Supply Project, led by SA Water, which intends to build a similar-sized desalination plant to that originally proposed by the company. Prospective sites are all located within the upper Spencer Gulf, renewing the threat posed to the aggregation. An environmental impact statement is anticipated mid-2024.

==== Port proposals ====
Due to its proximity to the ore deposits of the Middleback Ranges, several mining companies have indicated they might use a bulk commodities port, should it be developed at Port Bonython, adjacent to Point Lowly. A new wharf for the loading of iron ore, and possibly copper concentrates, has been proposed but not constructed. A community action group called the Cuttlefish Coast Coalition and Alternative Port Working Party were formed in opposition to new desalination and port developments near the cuttlefish breeding habitat. In 2021, a new port development was approved for the site of the former Playford power stations, which were decommissioned and demolished in the mid 2010s. Increasing shipping traffic in the upper Spencer Gulf has the potential to impact cuttlefish behavior due to cephalopod sensitivity to high intensity, low frequency sound.

== In popular culture ==
The upper Spencer Gulf cuttlefish aggregation is celebrated each year by Cuttlefest, an event hosted by the City of Whyalla.

In May 2009, D'Faces of Youth Arts and Snuff Puppets produced a live theatre performance for Come Out Festival. It featured several large cuttlefish puppets and appeared in Adelaide's Victoria Square, at the Adelaide Airport and at a Whyalla performance. Some controversy surrounded the performances after a participant in the project was openly critical of the plan to build a desalination plant at Point Lowly. The major sponsor of Come Out Festival in 2009 was the BHP Billiton Youth Fund, the same company which proposed to construct the desalination plant. The overarching theme of the festival that year was 'Colliding Worlds'. BHP Billiton has not sponsored the Come Out Festival since the 2009 event.

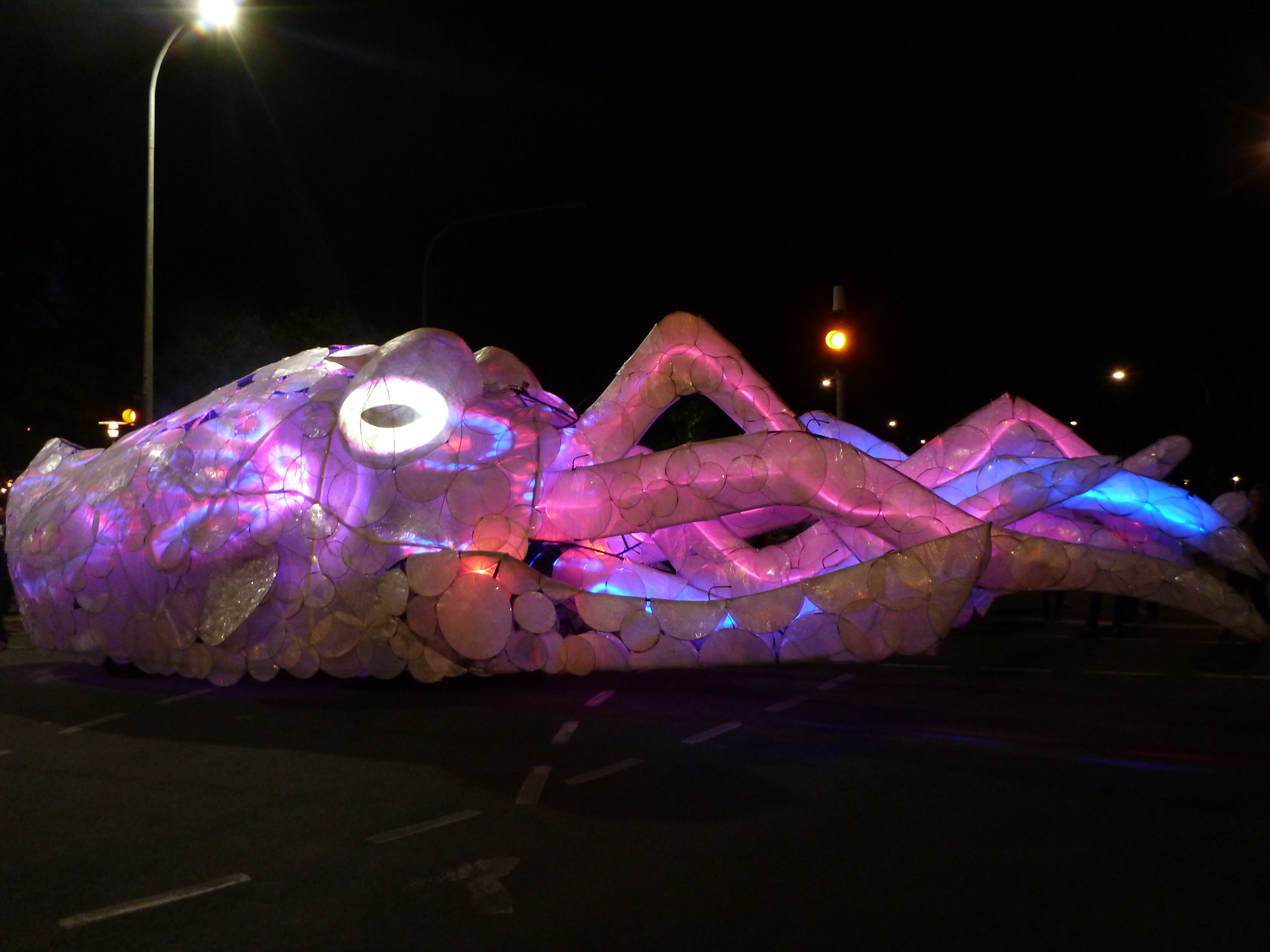
Stobie the Disco Cuttlefish at Adelaide Fringe Festival 2014

During the Adelaide Fringe Festival in March 2012, the Royal Institution of Australia presented Sepia, an original work by Welsh playwright, Emily Steel. Set in Whyalla, the play told the story of the fictitious character Neil, the proprietor of a caravan park who was struggling to come to terms with the cuttlefish decline whilst trying to keep his family together. The play also featured at the Melbourne Fringe Festival. Presenting partner the Royal Institution of Australia is sponsored by the oil and gas company Santos. Santos was responsible for hydrocarbon groundwater contamination at Port Bonython, adjacent to the cuttlefish breeding grounds, first discovered in 2008.

In 2014, the Adelaide Fringe Festival launched Stobie the Disco Cuttlefish, a 13-metre-long (43 ft) electrified cuttlefish puppet, equipped with strobing, coloured lighting and a sound system. Stobie the Disco Cuttlefish first appeared during the Adelaide Fringe Opening Parade, then performed with a troupe of dancers each Saturday night during the festival. The soundtrack to the performance included samples from the Bee Gees hit "Stayin' Alive" and the entire theme song from the movie Fame.

In 2016, underwater photographer Scott Portelli's image Cuttlefish aggregation won the national first prize (Australia) in the 2015 Sony World Photography Awards—the world's biggest photography competition.

The mass aggregation of giant cuttlefish at Point Lowly inspired the development of a retro computer game called Cuttle Scuttle.

== See also ==
- Cephalopod size
