= Save Point Lowly =

Save Point Lowly is a community action group based in Whyalla, South Australia. The group was formed circa 2008 to present an alternative vision for the future of the Point Lowly area north-west of Whyalla and resist plans for heavy industrialization. The group aspired to raising the profile of the Point Lowly area, including the giant Australian cuttlefish aggregation, which the group believes is under threat from a number of industrial proposals including: a seawater desalination plant for BHP Billiton's Olympic Dam mine, a diesel distribution hub, a technical ammonium nitrate plant (which has since been abandoned) and an iron ore export facility. Collectively these development have been referred to by the Government of South Australia as the Port Bonython Minerals Precinct. The group's spokesperson and chairman is Andrew Melville-Smith who is a practising veterinarian and resident of Whyalla.

== Activity ==
The group has been engaged in petitioning, disseminating information to the public, lobbying of local and State government and protest activity since 2008. In 2009 the group staged a protest at the Whyalla airport, confronting Premier Mike Rann and visiting ministers including Paul Holloway. The protest was an effort to represent their views regarding the preservation of Point Lowly and to request hearings with the Premier and his cabinet after allegedly being denied the opportunity through formal channels.

The group was publicly opposed to the location of the proposed desalination plant, and has suggested that an alternative location on the west coast of Eyre Peninsula was possible, and could be powered by wind-generated renewable energy. The group has also opposed the proposal to build a new iron ore export facility at Port Bonython, describing its location as "third rate" and drawing attention to the red dust impacts of Onesteel's (now Arrium) iron ore exports from Whyalla. Additional concerns include the potential for increased shipping to disturb the breeding grounds for giant Australian cuttlefish and other marine life. Concerns over shipping noise impacting the future of the cuttlefish breeding ground has also been expressed by the Marine Life Society of South Australia.

The Save Point Lowly group campaigned to have the peninsula rezoned from industrial to recreational and tourism but was unsuccessful. The Alternative Port Working Party has continued to campaign for rezoning since the Save Point Lowly group became inactive in 2011.

== Status ==
The group has been inactive since 2011, the same year in which the Olympic Dam mine expansion plans received state and federal environmental approvals. A Facebook group still exists for Save Point Lowly. At its height, the group had hundreds of members. The Facebook group's membership was greatly reduced (by hundreds) during an upgrade of Facebook's group management system.

In 2012, the Save Point Lowly website was archived by the State Library of South Australia and remains available via Pandora.
