= Port Bonython Fuels =

Port Bonython Fuels is a fuel importation and diesel distribution hub at Port Bonython on the Point Lowly peninsula in South Australia's upper Spencer Gulf region. The development was designed to supply the State's expanding oil, gas and mineral resources sectors' operations in the north and west of the state. It allows South Australia to import fuel from ships carrying cargoes in excess of 100,000 tonnes- approximately four times the size of vessels currently importing diesel via Port Adelaide. The project is owned by Petro Diamond Australia, a wholly owned subsidiary of Mitsubishi Corporation. The first stage of the project was officially opened in May 2016.

== Petroleum importation in South Australia ==
Prior to establishment of Port Bonython Fuels, South Australia imported hydrocarbons at ports with significant depth constraints. The two berths receiving hydrocarbons were at Kirton Point, Port Lincoln (with a draught of 9.9 metres) and at Inner harbor, Port Adelaide (with a draught of 10.7 metres). With a depth of approximately 20 metres, Port Bonython will be able to receive cargoes from much larger tankers than at the state's shallower ports.

== Ownership ==
The terminal is owned by IOR Terminals Pty Ltd, an Australian company based in Adelaide, South Australia. The facility is operated by Coogee Chemicals. The pre-existing 2.4 kilometre long jetty at Port Bonython is used by Port Bonython Fuels to import hydrocarbons. The jetty was constructed by Santos Ltd in 1982, and was sold to the Government of South Australia in 1983 for $48.2 million. As of 2015, the jetty remains Government infrastructure but has been used exclusively by Santos for the export of hydrocarbon products.

== Operations ==
Fuel is imported to a land-based tank farm then distributed via tankers up to A-Triple in size. Vessels berth at the existing wharf at Port Bonython, which is capable of accommodating vessels of 120,000 DWT. Two new loading arms were added to the jetty to support the facility's needs, along with 5.2 km of pipeline which connects the berth with the land-based facility. Three tanks have been constructed, each with a capacity of 27 million litres. The tank farm at Stage 1 has an aggregate storage capacity of 81 million litres. The facility was designed to offer a 24-hour, 7-day-per-week service.

== History ==
Port Bonython Fuels was originally conceived by Stuart Petroleum and the Scott Group of Companies in August 2007, as a $45 million joint venture project. It was disclosed as part of the Government of South Australia's plan to support the growth of the mining sector in 2008. A Development Application was lodged with the Government of South Australia by Stuart Petroleum in May 2009. The Port Bonython Fuels project received development approval in January 2010. Senex Energy acquired Stuart Petroleum, then sold Port Bonython Fuels to Mitsubishi Corporation in 2012–13. The project was re-announced in 2014, and valued at $110 million. Treasurer Tom Koutsantonis described the facility as providing a "competitive and reliable supply and helping underpin future economic growth."

The proposal was met with opposition from the Alternative Port Working Party, which has campaigned for the relocation of industrial development projects away from the Point Lowly peninsula. Spokesperson Sid Wilson told the ABC in 2014:

"We still have the concern that they are degrading the natural environment - as much as they'll create 10 new jobs full-time they'll degrade the tourism and recreation appeal of that area. Really our concern is that they're developing the best piece of coastal marine land within 100 kilometres of Whyalla."

The first stage of the project was officially opened in May 2016.

The project and its partners' interests are represented to the South Australian parliament by resources sector specialist lobbyist, Barker Wentworth.

In 2020, the facility was purchased by IOR.
