= False Bay, South Australia =

False Bay
- Location in South Australia
- Location: Spencer Gulf, South Australia
- Coordinates: 32°59′13″S 137°38′45″E
- Type: Bay
- Basin countries: Australia

The False Bay is an 11-kilometre (6.8 mi) wide south-southeasterly facing bay in South Australia's upper Spencer Gulf region. It extends from the Whyalla steelworks at the southern end to Black Point at the eastern end. It features very wide, low gradient tidal, sand and salt flats which are up to 7 kilometres (4.3 mi) wide. Five very low energy, rarely visited beaches are accessible to the public. The two boundary beaches are accessible by vehicles from the Port Bonython Road while the central three are surrounded by salt and tidal flats and tidal creeks. False Bay's beaches are not patrolled but are rated among the state's least hazardous.

== Location and features ==
False Bay is a favored spot for windsurfing and is described by local club members as a great onshore jump haven. The waves are consistently larger than those occurring in Adelaide coastal waters and the winds are often strong with winter northerlies providing prime conditions. False Bay is best sailed from the far eastern corner.

There is a total ban on the taking of cephalopods (cuttlefish, squid and octopus) in the waters of False Bay. The closure was created to protect the annual breeding aggregation of Sepia apama which occurs in the area and on adjacent rocky reefs at Whyalla and towards Point Lowly.
