= Whyalla Conservation Park =

Protected area in South Australia

- IUCN category III (natural monument or feature)
- Location within South Australia
- Location: South Australia, Whyalla Barson
- Nearest city: Whyalla
- Coordinates: 32°57′11″S 137°32′33″E
- Area: 19.71 km^{2} (7.61 sq mi)
- Established: 4 November 1971
- Governing body: Department for Environment and Water

Whyalla Conservation Park (formerly Whyalla National Park) is a protected area located in the Australian state of South Australia about 10 kilometres (6.2 miles) north of the centre of city of Whyalla immediately adjoining the Lincoln Highway.

The conservation park was proclaimed under the National Parks and Wildlife Act 1972 in 1972 in respect to an area of land already under statutory protection since 4 November 1971 as the "Whyalla National Park". The conservation park was described in 1998 in one source as follows:

…it is acknowledged as a fine example of the Western myall/chenopod (Acacia papyrocarpa/chenopod) woodland so characteristic of north-eastern Eyre Peninsula. It was conserved both for the conservation value of this woodland and for its position only 10 km north of the City of Whyalla. It was intended to serve a recreational purpose for Whyalla as a picnic site.

The conservation park has been located within the suburb of Whyalla Barson since 2011 and is classified as an IUCN Category III protected area. In 1980, it was listed on the now-defunct Register of the National Estate.

== See also ==
- Protected areas of South Australia
