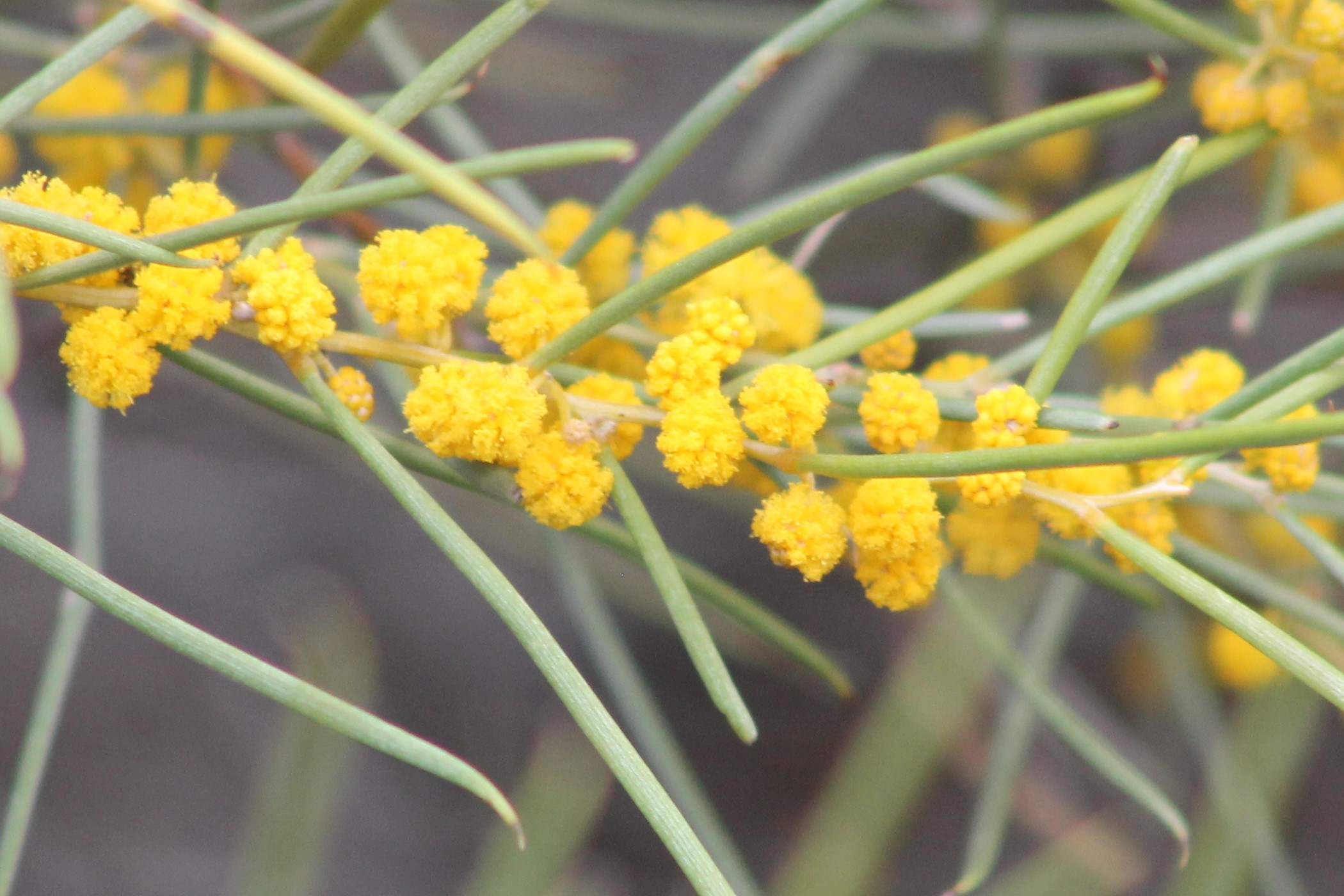
- In Whyalla Conservation Park

Scientific classification
- Kingdom: Plantae
- Clade: Embryophytes
- Clade: Tracheophytes
- Clade: Spermatophytes
- Clade: Angiosperms
- Clade: Eudicots
- Clade: Rosids
- Order: Fabales
- Family: Fabaceae
- Subfamily: Caesalpinioideae
- Clade: Mimosoid clade
- Genus: Acacia
- Species: A. papyrocarpa

Binomial name
- Acacia papyrocarpa Benth.
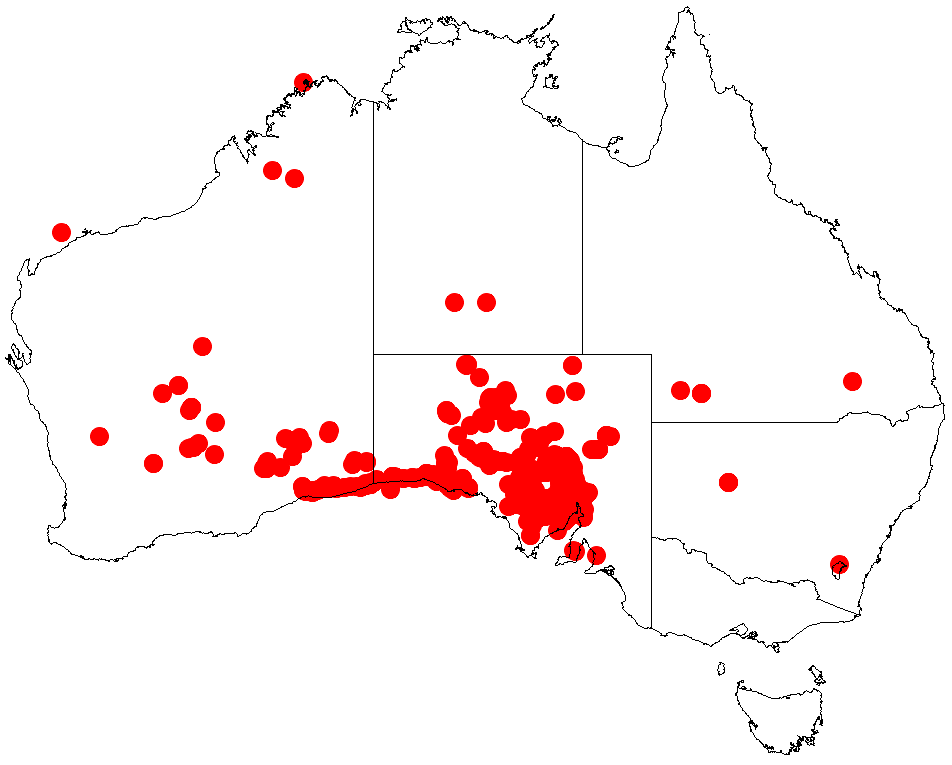
- Occurrence data from AVH

= Acacia papyrocarpa =

Western myall

Species of plant

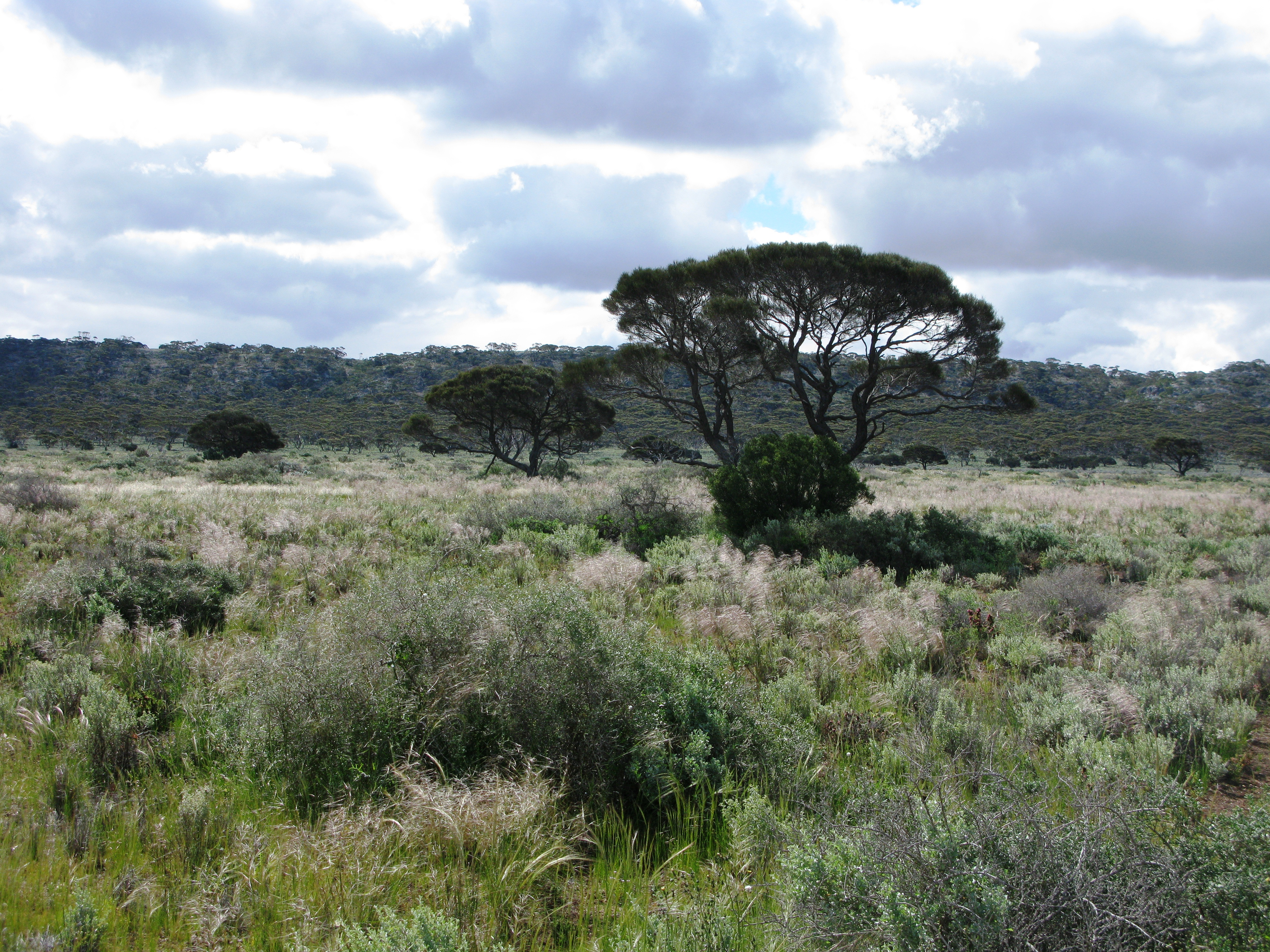
On the Roe Plains, near Madura, Western Australia

Acacia papyrocarpa, commonly known as western myall, is a tree in the family Fabaceae native to arid areas of central and western Australia.

== Description ==
Western myall typically grows as a shrub or an upright tree to a height of 2 to 8 m (6 ft 7 in to 26 ft 3 in) but can grow as tall as 10 m (33 ft). It has fissured grey coloured bark and a dense spreading to rounded crown. It has pendulous and hairy branchlets. Like most Acacia species, it has phyllodes rather than true leaves. These are greyish-green in colour, straight and flat, between 4 and 12 cm (1.6 and 4.7 in) in length and 1 to 2 mm (0.039 to 0.079 in) wide. The hairy phyllodes are acuminate with a fine curved and innocuous point that is not rigid and have many closely parallel indistinct nerves. It blooms between August and November producing rudimentary inflorescences. The flowers are yellow, and held in spherical clusters that are about 5 mm (0.20 in) in diameter and contain 20 to 25 golden flowers. After flowering thin and flat seed pods form that have a length of about 11 cm (4.3 in) and a width of 4 to 10 mm (0.16 to 0.39 in) that are flat with a narrowly oblong shape. The subnitid dark brown seeds inside the pods have a broadly elliptic to ovate shape with a length of 4.5 to 5 mm (0.18 to 0.20 in).

== Taxonomy ==
The species was first formally described by the botanist George Bentham in 1864 as part of the work Flora Australiensis. It was reclassified as Racosperma papyrocarpum by Leslie Pedley in 2003 then transferred back to genus Acacia in 2006. The only other synonyms are Acacia sowdeni and Acacia sowdenii.

== Distribution ==
It is endemic to arid parts of central Australia, it occurs on limestone plains in southern Australia from Paynes Find in Western Australia eastwards into South Australia. There is also an anomalous specimen at Cooper Creek in Queensland. A weeping form of the species that grows at Roxby Downs, South Australia bears the common name water myall. It is commonly situated on low limestone rises, saline or clay flats where it grows in calcareous sandy loam or clay soils.

== See also ==
- List of Acacia species
