= BHP Whyalla Tramway =

Heavy-haul iron ore railway in South Australia

Overview
- Owner: Liberty Steel Group
- Locale: Eyre Peninsula
- Termini: Whyalla Steelworks; Iron Knob Iron Baron Iron Duke

Service
- Operator: Aurizon

History
- Opened: 1901

Technical
- Track gauge: 1067 mm (3 ft 6 in)

The BHP Whyalla Tramway is a 1067 mm (3 ft 6 in) gauge heavy-haul railway, 112 kilometres (70 miles) long, on the Eyre Peninsula in South Australia. It runs from haematite mines at Iron Monarch, Iron Baron and Iron Duke in the Middleback Range, about 50 kilometres (31 miles) west of Whyalla, to company steelworks at the coastal city of Whyalla. Opened in 1901, it was built by, and until 2000 operated by, BHP. (Note: At the time BHP was spun off, the company division was known as OneSteel; it was renamed Arrium in 2012.) As of 2021 it was owned by Liberty Steel Group and operated on its behalf by rail operator One Rail Australia, which was sold in 2022 to Aurizon.

== History ==
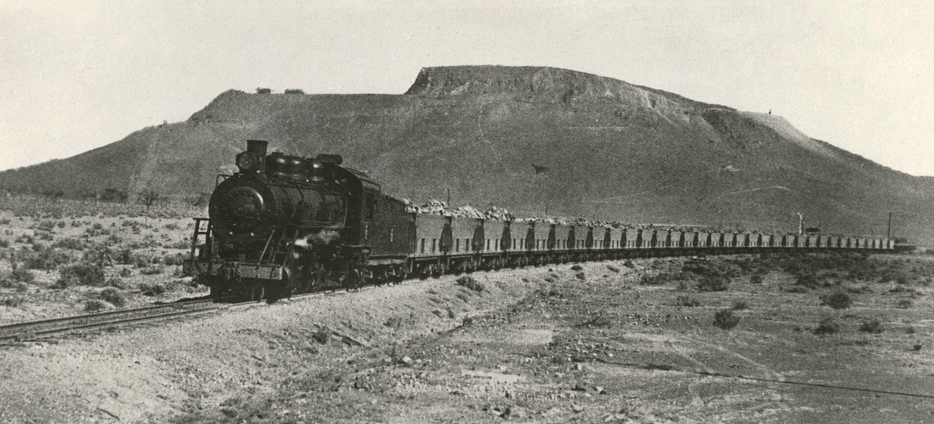
In 1935, BHP's 2000-ton trainloads were unequalled in Australia. In the background is Iron Monarch, which rises 100 metres (330 feet) above the surrounding plain.

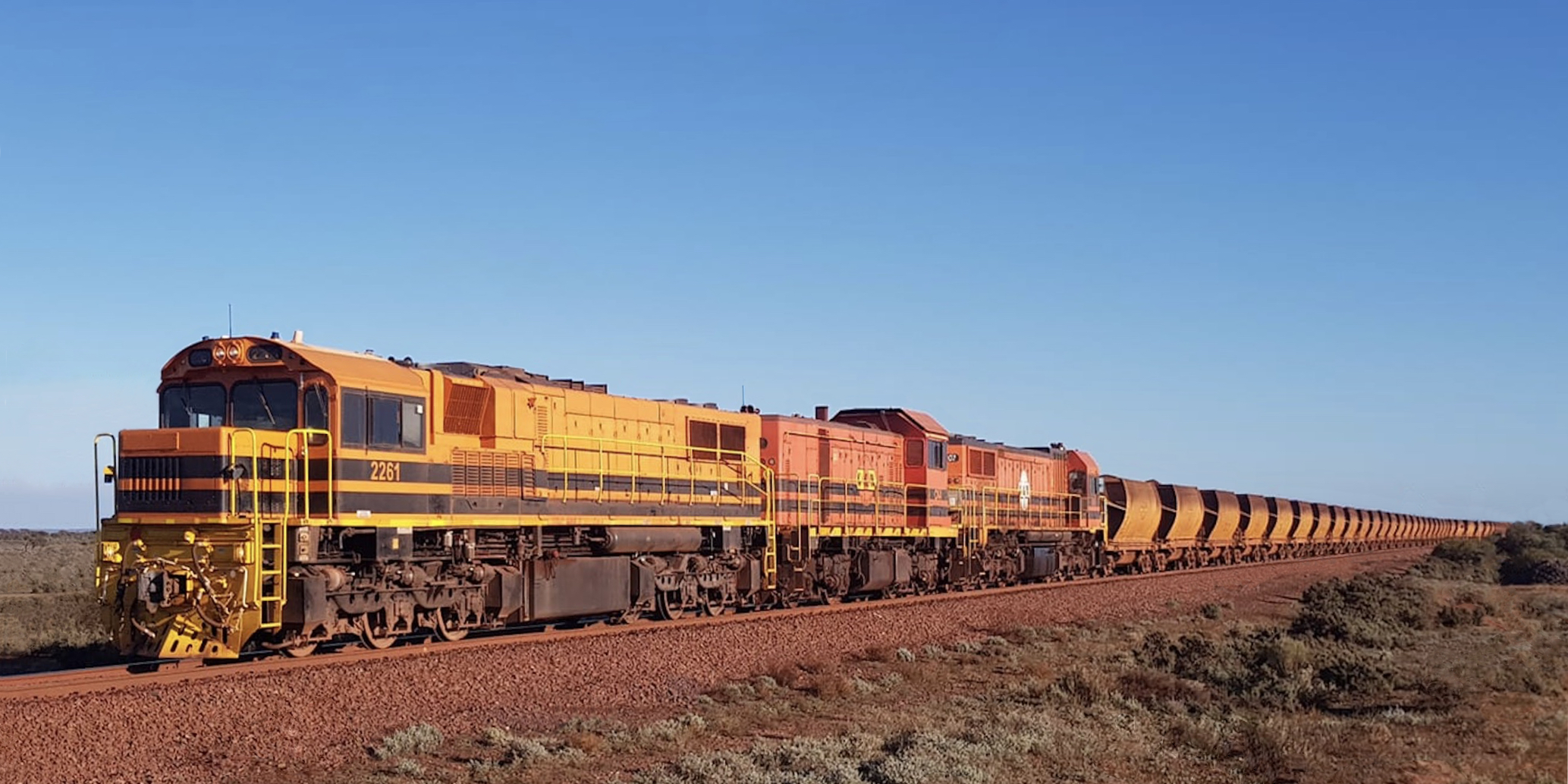
An ore train on the line in 2019

In 1899, BHP was granted a lease to mine iron ore from the Middleback Ranges. The Hummock Hill to Iron Knob Tramways and Jetties Act 1900 authorised BHP to build a 54 kilometre line from Hummock Hill, Whyalla to Iron Knob that opened on 28 August 1901.

In 1930, a branch opened from Middleton Junction to Iron Baron. The latter closed in 1947 and reopened in 1958. In 1990 it was extended 32 kilometres from Iron Baron to Iron Duke. After iron ore production ceased at Iron Baron in 1991 and Iron Duke in 1998, the line from Middleton Junction closed. With the reopening of the Iron Baron Mine, in mid-2012 the line reopened to Iron Baron.

In the 1960s, the internal Whyalla Steelworks network was converted to standard gauge to allow large 200 ton capacity torpedo ladles to be used. It also allowed standard gauge trains from interstate to access the steelworks when the Whyalla railway line opened in October 1972.

In 2000, operations were contracted out to Australian Southern Railroad (ASR), with locomotive maintenance taken over by Clyde Engineering and track maintenance by Transfield. In July 2022, the contract was included in the sale of One Rail Australia, as ASR had become, to Aurizon.

== Rolling stock ==
Many of the steam locomotives used on the tramway were transferred from BHP's Broken Hill operations. By 1941, the fleet comprised 12 locomotives.

A petrol-electric locomotive was purchased from the Davenport Locomotive Works, Iowa in 1928 for use at Iron Knob.

DH and DE class diesel locomotives replaced the steam locomotives in the 1950s. With the reopening of the line to Iron Baron, five GWNs were delivered in 2013. In July 2019, five former Queensland Railways 2250 class locomotives were repatriated from South Africa to replace the GWNs.
