= Whyalla Barson, South Australia =

Whyalla Barson Whyalla, South Australia
- Coordinates: 32.97758441°S 137.56443136°E
- Population: 0 (SAL 2016)
- Established: 2011
- Postcode(s): 5601
- Time zone: ACST (UTC+9:30)
  - Summer (DST): ACST (UTC+10:30)
- LGA(s): City of Whyalla unincorporated area
- State electorate(s): Giles
- Federal division(s): Grey
Suburbs around Whyalla Barson:
Cultana	Cultana	Cultana
Cultana	Whyalla Barson	False Bay
Middleback Range	Whyalla city	Spencer Gulf

Whyalla Barson is a suburb in South Australia located on the northern side of the city of Whyalla in the north east corner of Eyre Peninsula. It is named after Thomas Leonard Barson, superintendent of BHP in Whyalla from 1933 to 1938. The suburb was first established in 2011 with revisions to boundaries occurring both in 2013 and 2014.

Whyalla Barson is located within the federal Division of Grey, the state electoral district of Giles and is located within both the local government area of the City of Whyalla and the unincorporated areas of South Australia. The land within Whyalla Barson is used for purposes such as the Whyalla Conservation Park, and the Whyalla Steelworks and the associated port infrastructure which is being operated by Arrium as of 2015. The Lincoln Highway passes through the suburb on its way to the city of Whyalla.

== See also ==
- List of cities and towns in South Australia
