= Iron Baron, South Australia =

Iron Baron
- Suburb
- Coordinates: 32°59′54″S 137°09′26″E
- Country: Australia
- State: South Australia
- Region: Far North
- LGA: Pastoral Unincorporated Area
- Location: 413 km (257 mi) north-west of Adelaide; 40 km (25 mi) west of Whyalla
- Established: 26 April 2013

Government
  - State electorate: Giles
  - Federal division: Grey
- Time zone: UTC+9:30 (ACST)
  - Summer (DST): UTC+10:30 (ACST)
- Postcode: 5601
- County: York
- Mean max temp: 23.8 °C (74.8 °F)
- Mean min temp: 11.5 °C (52.7 °F)
- Annual rainfall: 266.8 mm (10.50 in)
Suburbs around Iron Baron
| Myola Station | Myola Station | Myola Station |
| Myola Station | Iron Baron | Myola Station |
| Myola Station | Myola Station | Myola Station |
- Locations; Adjoining localities

Iron Baron was a settlement associated with the Iron Baron iron ore mine (32°59′48″S 137°09′30″E) on Eyre Peninsula at the southern edge of South Australia's Far North region, 413 kilometres (257 miles) north-west of Adelaide.

The settlement was situated about 200 metres from the eastern boundary of the mine. BHP owned and serviced the settlement, having built it about 1938. There were several dozen houses, a one-teacher primary school, a general store, oval, swimming pool, netball courts, picnic areas and licensed community club.

Before the mine’s re-opening in 2011, BHP bulldozed all the settlement's surface infrastructure, including buildings, into a pit at the mine. Employees now commute from Whyalla or elsewhere.

== Operation of the nearby mine ==
The Iron Baron mine is one of several large orebodies in the Middleback Range, with a production capacity of about two million tonnes of haematite a year. Built by BHP in 1933, it went out of operation between 1947 and 1958; it was re-opened in 2011. On-site facilities now include a fully functional ore beneficiation plant.

== Related mines ==
- Iron Knob
- Iron Knight
- Iron Duke

== See also ==
- List of cities and towns in South Australia
