= Corunna Station =

Pastoral lease in South Australia

Coordinates: 32.683°S 137.127°E

Location in South Australia

Corunna Station is a pastoral lease that operates as a sheep station in South Australia.

It is situated approximately 6 kilometres (4 mi) north of Iron Knob and 56 kilometres (35 mi) north west of Whyalla on the Eyre Peninsula. Corunna takes its name from Caroona Hill that was an important point for explorers, as it was one of the few places with surface water between Port Augusta and Uno. The name for the hill and station are taken from a local Aboriginal Australian word for "heron" or "crane".

The property occupies an area of 576 square kilometres (222 sq mi), and is bisected by the Eyre Highway.

== History ==
The lease for Corunna was first taken up in 1861 for pastoral purposes. In 1863 the property was put up for auction. At that time it occupied an area of 122 square miles (316 km^{2}) and was stocked with 6,080 sheep. Messrs Scott and Nickolls owned the property in 1867. In 1888 a prospector named William Jones applied for a mining lease south of Corunna, which was granted in 1890.

The French family acquired the property in 1977. In 2005 the family took the federal government to the Federal Court of Australia after it tried to acquire the property. The Government wanted to take the property and give it to the Barngarla Aboriginal people as compensation for the land the Government took from them for the Australian Army's Cultana training area. The family spent A$100,000 fighting the acquisition and won in 2013. The Government subsequently appealed to the Full Bench of the Federal Court, but then shortly afterwards decided to withdraw the appeal.

The land occupying the extent of the Corunna Station pastoral lease was gazetted by the Government of South Australia as a locality in April 2013 under the name "Corunna Station".

== See also ==
- List of ranches and stations
