= Iron Knob =

Iron ore mine in South Australia

- Town
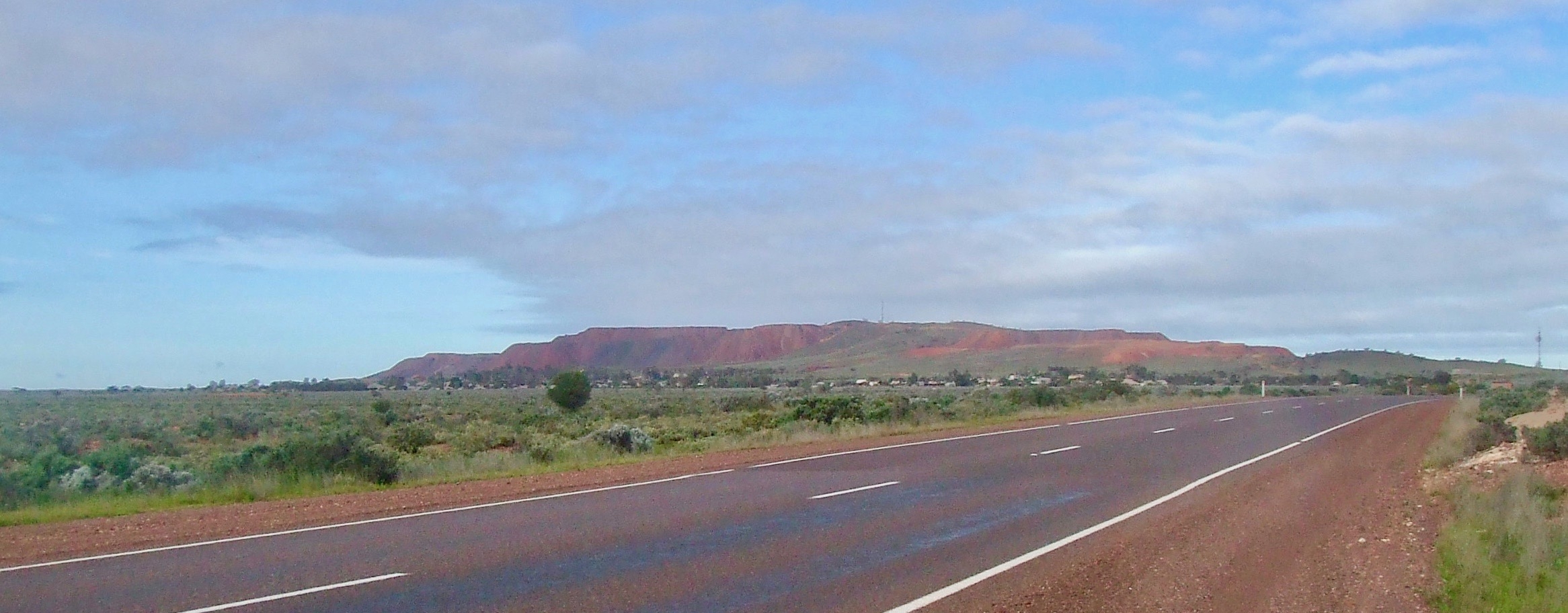

- Coordinates: 32°44′01″S 137°08′57″E
- Country: Australia
- State: South Australia
- Region: Far North
- LGA: Pastoral Unincorporated Area
- Location: 375 km (233 mi) NW of Adelaide; 70 km (43 mi) SW of Port Augusta; 55 km (34 mi) NW of Whyalla
- Established: 11 February 1915 (town); 29 July 2004 (locality)

Government
  - State electorate: Giles
  - Federal division: Grey
- Elevation: 66 m (217 ft)

Population
  - Total: 110 (SAL 2021)
- Time zone: UTC+9:30 (ACST)
  - Summer (DST): UTC+10:30 (ACST)
- Postcode: 5611
- County: Manchester
- Mean max temp: 23.7 °C (74.7 °F)
- Mean min temp: 11.5 °C (52.7 °F)
- Annual rainfall: 263.4 mm (10.37 in)
Localities around Iron Knob
Corunna Station	Corunna Station	Cultana
Corunna Station; Katanga Station	Iron Knob	Cultana
Katanga Station	Katanga Station	Cultana

Iron Knob is a town in the Australian state of South Australia on the Eyre Peninsula immediately south of the Eyre Highway. At the 2006 census, Iron Knob and the surrounding area had a population of 199. The town obtained its name from its proximity to large deposits of iron ore, most notably Iron Monarch which outcropped prominently from the relatively flat, surrounding landscape.

== Iron ore mining ==
The name Iron Knob first appeared on pastoral lease maps of 1854. The first mineral claim in the area was pegged by BHP in 1897. Mining commenced in 1900. Iron ore was first transported by bullock wagon to Port Augusta, where it was loaded on to 200-ton barges. From 1903, it was transported by rail to Whyalla and ship to Port Pirie where it was used as a flux in the lead smelter there. In 1901 the BHP Whyalla Tramway from Iron Knob to Hummock Hill (later renamed Whyalla) was completed, followed by wharves in 1903. These allowed the direct loading of ships which could transport the ore across Spencer Gulf to Port Pirie.

Iron Knob's iron ore proved to be of such high quality (upwards of 60% purity) that it led to the development of the Australian steel industry. It supplied iron to the Newcastle Steelworks and Port Kembla in the 1910s and 1920s and Whyalla in the 1930s. The iron ore was transported by the BHP Whyalla Tramway to Whyalla where it was either smelted or dispatched by sea.

21% of the steel required for the construction of the Sydney Harbour Bridge was quarried at Iron Knob and smelted at Port Kembla, New South Wales. The remaining 79% was imported from Britain.

In the 1920s, iron ore from Iron Knob was exported to the Netherlands and the United States of America. In the 1930s, customers included Germany and the United Kingdom.

Prior to World War II, iron ore from Iron Knob was also exported to Japan. In the financial year 1935–36, 291,961 tonnes of ore from Iron Knob was shipped there via the seaport of Whyalla. This became a controversial matter in the late 1930s due in part to Australia's known reserves at the time being limited to Iron Knob and Yampi Sound in Western Australia. Japan was also considered an 'aggressor' nation following acts of war against China in 1937. Waterfront workers and seamen protested against the export of iron ore to Japan, leading to strikes and arrests.

In 1937, output from the Middleback Range, mostly from Iron Monarch was estimated at 2 mtpa. In 1939, it was referred to in England as the highest grade deposit of iron ore known in the world. In 1943, the iron Knob deposit was still delivering an average ore grade of 64 percent metallic content. In 1949, 99% of Australian demand for iron ore was met by supply from Iron Knob and associated mines in South Australia, having risen from 95% in 1943.

Additional deposits of iron ore were developed by the Broken Hill Proprietary Company further south along the Middleback Range. These include Iron Baron, Iron Prince and Iron Queen (discovered in 1920) and Iron Knight, Iron Duchess and Iron Duke (discovered in 1934).

=== Mine closure and re-opening ===
Quarrying for iron at Iron Knob and Iron Monarch ended in 1998. When the quarrying stopped, the town population declined to 200 and Iron Knob was under threat of becoming a ghost town. However, due to rising prices of housing elsewhere, the town has attracted new residents seeking low cost residences. A home could be purchased for approximately A$35,000–70,000 and vacant land could be purchased for less than A$15,000.

In 2010, Onesteel (later Arrium) announced that it would return to Iron Knob to reopen the Iron Monarch mine. The Iron Monarch mine was prepared for reopening by Arrium in 2013. As of 2015, both Iron Monarch and Iron Duke continue to produce iron ore for export and for smelting at the Whyalla Steelworks.

== Transport ==
In the early days of mining at Iron Knob, ironstone was carted by oxen to Hummock Hill (renamed Whyalla in 1914). Approximately 300 long tons (336 short tons) was delivered in a good week. Construction of a private railway greatly increased transportation rates and by 1939, 9000 long tons (10,080 short tons) of ore were delivered daily to Whyalla by rail; trains carried loads of 2000 long tons (2240 short tons).

Ships operated by the BHP Shipping were named with Iron as their prefix; some were built by the company at the Whyalla Steelworks.

Highway 1 regularly closes due to controlled explosions.

== See also ==
- Iron Baron
