= Port Bonython oil spill =

Oil spill in South Australia in 1992

The Port Bonython oil spill occurred on 30 August 1992, when the fuel tank of the tanker Era was pierced by the bow of the tugboat Turmoil during berthing operations in upper Spencer Gulf, South Australia. Wind and swell were high and 296 tonnes of bunker fuel were released into Spencer Gulf. The incident resulted in 500 oiled birds and damage to 15 km of mangrove and seagrass habitat south-west of Port Pirie.

== Spill ==
=== 30 August ===
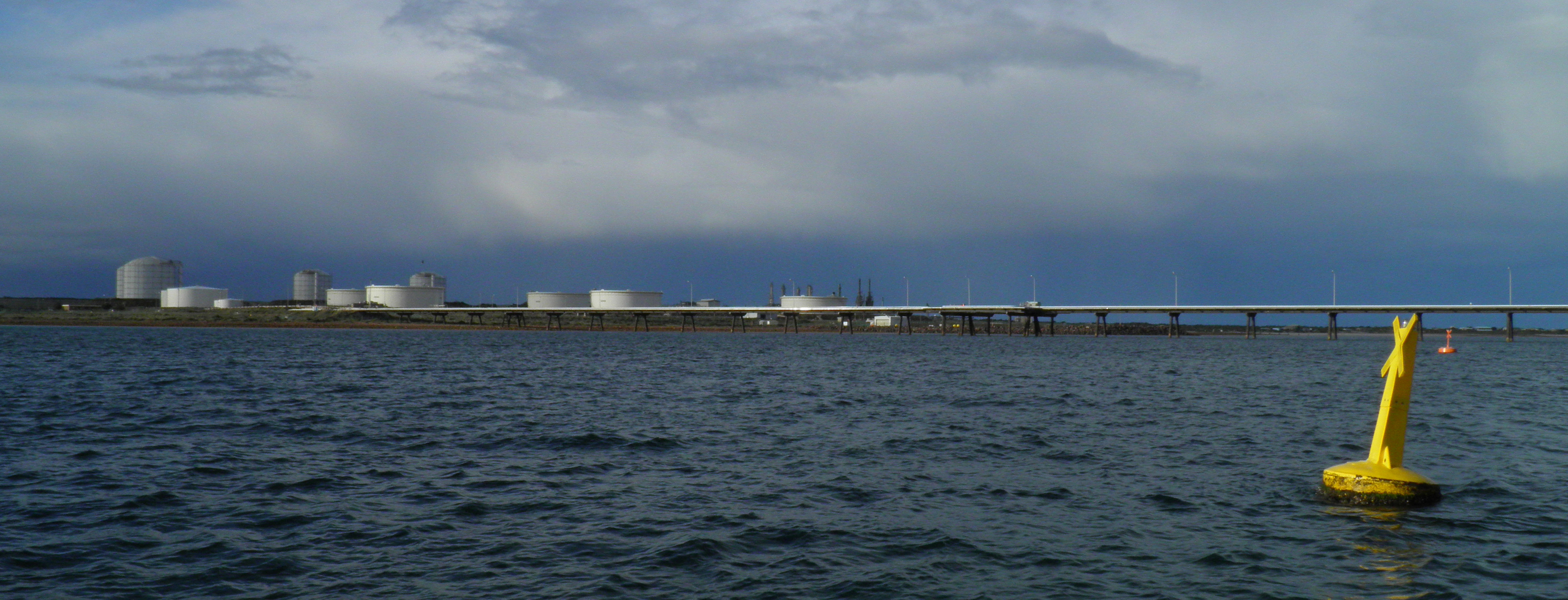
Port Bonython, Upper Spencer Gulf

The spill occurred at 10.52am, as the Era was berthing at the Port Bonython wharf in rough seas. The vessel had arrived to load oil for the Kwinana Oil Refinery. The Era was chartered by BP and the tugboat involved, Turmoil, was property of the Adelaide Steamship Company. Also present were the tugboat Taminga and the line-boat Wanilla. A lug on the Turmoil's bow pierced the hull of the tanker, leaving a 20 cm hole in the hull and rupturing her fuel tank. The 94,287 deadweight tonne vessel was listed 5 degrees to slow the flow of heavy bunker oil, and the leak was eventually stopped at 2.12pm. A total of 296 tonnes of heavy fuel oil had escaped into the sea.

== Response ==
The slick was described in the official report as "a moderate sheen with streaks of heavy dark oil moving round the stern of the vessel." Tug boats were driven through the slick in an attempt to break it up, and the spraying of chemical dispersant commenced soon after the spill occurred. 400 litres of Corexit 7764 and 4200 litres of Corexit 9527 were supplied by Santos.

The absence of an appropriate crane at the jetty made loading Turmoil with dispersant at Port Bonython impossible. Instead, the tugboat proceeded to Whyalla to load, while the dispersant was transported there by road. The Santos-owned Shark Cat Tregalana loaded in Santos' boat harbor. The other vessels present were unable to assist due to the Wanilla requiring towing by the Taminga. A line had fouled its propeller during the berthing of the Era.

Three different chemical dispersants were used: Corexit 7764, Corexit 9527 and Ardrox 6120. Strong north-westerly winds of up to 25 knots combined with tide and current initially transported the oil slick eastwards, towards Port Germein. The high winds prevented the early use of containment booms.

Assisted by the Department of Environment and Planning, volunteers prepared for the possibility of a 'massive clean-up'.

=== 31 August – Day 2 ===
The 20 cm hole in the fuel tank of the Era was temporarily repaired, and the tanker was loaded in preparation to sail for Kwinana, Western Australia in the evening. The Department of Marine and Harbors announced that the oil spill posed no threat to wildlife. At this time, only 30 tonnes of oil was left at the sea's surface. The slick was estimated to be dense, 500 m long and 100 m wide.

=== 1 September – Day 3 ===
The Era departed Port Bonython for Kwinana, Western Australia at 5.30am, laden with 22,990 tonnes of crude oil from the Cooper Basin.

The spill had attracted national news media attention. A visible 10-20 tonne slick remained on the water's surface after the majority of the oil had been sprayed with chemical dispersant. The dispersal of the slick involved 50 people, five boats, a helicopter and spotter aircraft.

25 Special Emergency Services (SES) personnel were placed on standby. Staff from the Australian Marine Oil Spill Centre (AMOSC) were present to supervise the use of booms to channel the oil, and some oil was recovered by this method. At this time, there had been no reports of dead fish or birds. About 10 volunteers were ready at Port Pirie to handle any oiled wildlife. Council workers were also dispatched from the Mount Remarkable District Council to assist.

Local pilot Syd Cheesman said that he had seen places where "the oil is on the bottom and the water is on top of it." He also described the slick as covering "an extensive area".

=== 2 September – Day 4 ===
About 10 tonnes of oil had washed into mangroves overnight. A slick 15 km long had been seen drifting 1 km off Port Pirie. A makeshift animal hospital was established in Port Pirie. Small boats searched at first light for oiled birds.

The visible oil was described by David Gray of the Australian Maritime Safety Authority as 'a sheen on the water'. Some of this sheen impacted the mangroves and a number of tidal creeks to the south-west of Port Pirie.

The estimated number of impacted birds was revised from 100 birds to up to 500 birds as the search and recovery efforts began. Rescuers expressed concern about the birds' ingestion of oil as a consequence of preening.

=== 3 September – Day 5 ===
The oil had settled in the mangroves south-west of Port Pirie. More than 500 birds had now been affected and 20 dead birds had been recorded. Prawn fishermen and Fisheries officers collected samples of prawn larvae and seabed sediment for analysis. Fisherman David Wilks participated in the bird rescue and recovery and described the scene:

"As the tides recede, oil is plastered black all over the mangroves, oil is pouring out of the creeks with the tides and there's a film of oil left behind which is seeping into the seagrass beds."

Teams of volunteers scrubbed oiled birds overnight and prepared them for transport to the RSPCA in Lonsdale. Treated birds included pelicans, cormorants, grebes and herons. More than a dozen dead birds were collected on this day. Most of the dead birds recovered were cormorants. Fauna rescue researcher Ms Erna Walraven was intended to receive the dead birds in Sydney for further study. National Parks and Wildlife put a call out for more flat-bottomed boats and experienced boat operators to assist.

== Impact ==
Senior Environment and Planning Department officer Brian Wagstaff said the spill posed no long or medium-term ecological risk. He stated: "There won't be a die-back of mangroves, although there may be some loss of leaves... it's the birds that are the main concern."

At the time of the spill, environmental scientist Doug Reilly warned of the risk the slick posed to important breeding grounds of western king prawns. He also raised concerns about the potential threat chemical dispersant could pose to marine ecosystems. Mangrove and seagrass habitats were impacted, as were native birds and the local fishing industry.

=== Fishing industry ===
10 days after the spill, the South Australian Fishing Industry Council stated that 25 families had lost their income in the short term due to the spill. The Council stated that if the spill was found to have caused long-term damage to fishing grounds, millions of dollars in compensation would be sought from whoever was deemed liable.

== Responsibility ==
Professional fishermen, including the 39-member Spencer Gulf Prawn Fishermen's Association called for an independent inquiry into the incident and a review of all berthing procedures. Spokesperson Mick Puglisi stated that he believed the Era should never have berthed in such extreme weather.

A Department of Marine and Harbors spokesman said that it was unlikely that anyone would be charged under the Marine Pollution by Oil and Noxious Substances Act.

Two inquiries into the incident reached the conclusion that it was an unforeseeable accident for which no-one was to blame.

== Fate of the vessel ==
The vessel continued to sail as the Era until 1997, when it was renamed Frixos. It was decommissioned in 2010. Its final resting place was the Gadani ship-breaking yard northwest of Karachi, Pakistan.

== See also ==
- List of oil spills
