= Point Lowly =

- Suburb
- Interactive map of Point Lowly
- Coordinates: 32°59′58″S 137°47′7″E
- Country: Australia
- State: South Australia
- City: Whyalla
- LGA: City of Whyalla

Government
  - State electorate: Giles
  - Federal division: Grey

Population
  - Total: 34 (SAL 2021)
- Time zone: UTC+9:30 (ACST)
  - Summer (DST): UTC+10:30 (ACDT)
- Postcode: 5600
Suburbs around Point Lowly
Port Bonython	Point Lowly North	Spencer Gulf
Port Bonython	Point Lowly	Spencer Gulf
Whyalla	Spencer Gulf	Spencer Gulf

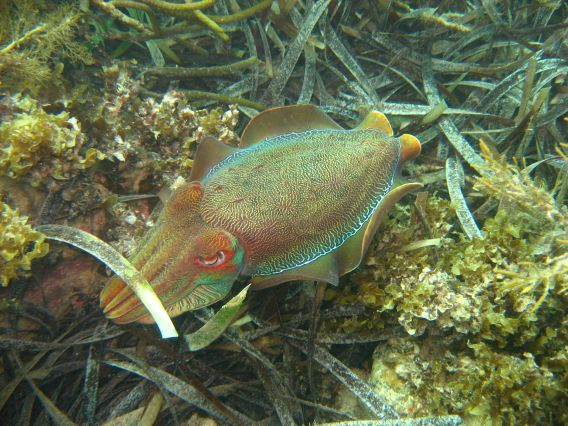
The giant Australian cuttlefish breed each winter in a mass aggregation near Point Lowly.

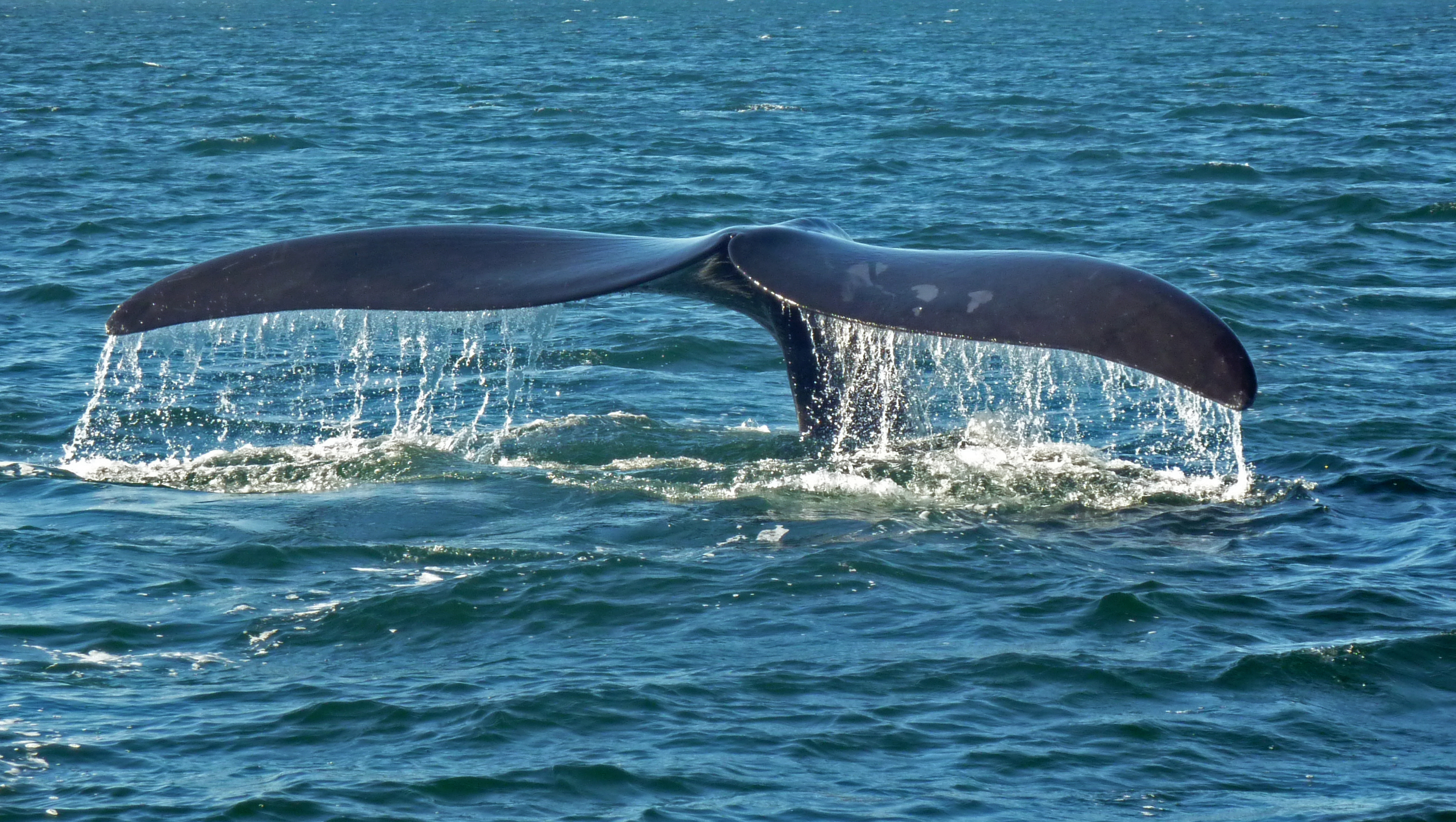
Southern right whales are occasional visitors to Point Lowly.

Point Lowly is the tip of a small peninsula north north-east of Whyalla in the Upper Spencer Gulf region of South Australia. The wider peninsula is shared by a combination of defence, industrial, residential, recreational and tourism interests. Port Bonython lies immediately to the north-west and is marked for future industrial expansion, driven by anticipated growth in the State's mining industry. The icons of the peninsula are the historic Point Lowly Lighthouse and the mass breeding aggregation of Australian giant cuttlefish which occurs inshore each winter.

Point Lowly was named by Matthew Flinders during explorations in 1802. It also bears the lesser-known alternative name of Cap Lafontaine, given by French explorer Nicolas Baudin during his explorations in the same period.

A boat-ramp exists north of the lighthouse for the benefit of commercial aquaculture operations and recreational users. Waters near Point Lowly include several popular grounds for snapper fishing. The fishing of snapper in all South Australian waters is prohibited from 1 November through 15 December.

== Wildlife ==
Diving and snorkelling during the giant Australian cuttlefish aggregation each winter is a popular recreational activity. The Northern Spencer Gulf population has been in steady decline for over a decade. Their decline is the subject of local and international concern. As of October 2013, research into the possible causes of the decline by SARDI, the EPA and University of Adelaide is ongoing.

Visiting southern right whales and humpback whales can occasionally be sighted from Point Lowly during winter months.

== Development ==
The Government of South Australia plans to develop a large section of the peninsula into the Port Bonython Minerals Precinct. The proposals include an iron ore export port, a seawater desalination plant for BHP's use and Port Bonython Fuels, a fuel distribution hub owned by Mitsubishi. As of July 2015, Port Bonython Fuels is under construction, the desalination plant has been deferred and the iron ore export wharf is yet to receive necessary state and federal environmental approvals.

Industrialization plans near Point Lowly have been met with public opposition from several community groups based in nearby Whyalla. Groups include Save Point Lowly, the Cuttlefish Coast Coalition and the Alternative Port Working Party. Their concerns relate to the cumulative impacts of these developments which could displace or deter other users and degrade the peninsula's environmental and social value.

Point Lowly was first made accessible by road from Whyalla in 1948. It was previously accessible by a rough track. Shack sites were made available in the late 1940s, with three applications received by 19 December 1947.

== Landforms ==
The Point Lowly peninsula is a low plateau, sloping NW - SE, in the Simmens quartzite member, of the Neoprotorozoic Tent Hill formation. The southern shore of the peninsula features 20 metre high bluffs over sloping shore platforms and small beaches. The bluffs and cliffs of the eastern side of the peninsula slope down to pebble beaches with some sand at high tide.

To the north, Fitzgerald Bay acts as a sand trap, shown by the storage of Holocene sands in wide nearshore low tide sandflats. Small areas of sand ridges exist at the head of the bay, where Holocene sand grit has been mixed with the Pleistocene red sands from the Gulf floor. The beach here is narrow high tide reflective in morpho-dynamic terms. Volcanics are exposed in cliffs and platforms at Backy Point. Small areas of sand dune are found near Point Lowly and at Weeroona Bay. At the Weroona Bay dunes backshore low cobble ridges occur, possibly formerly covered by white Holocene sands that are now immediately inland. No dating is available for these deposits; however, further north in the Gulf similar deposits are Pleistocene in age.

== Shared use ==
A variety of people and entities utilize the Point Lowly peninsula. These include:

- Australian Defence Force - Cultana Training Area
- Santos Limited - Port Bonython hydrocarbon processing plant
- Clean Seas Seafood - yellowtail kingfish aquaculture in Fitzgerald Bay (ceased operations in 2011, approved to resume in 2021)
- Port Bonython Fuels - Mitsubishi diesel distribution hub (commenced operations in 2016)
- Coastal home-owners
- Indigenous Australians
- Tourists and campers
- Fishers
- Scuba divers and snorkelers
