= Alternative Port Working Party =

The Alternative Port Working Party is a community action group based in Whyalla, South Australia on the shore of northern Spencer Gulf. Its membership includes a number of retired engineers with experience in mining, shipping and bulk commodities handling and its chief spokesperson is Sid Wilson. Since its formation, the group has advocated for a 'best of both' scenario for the nearby Point Lowly peninsula; one which represents the interests of both the local economy and residential, recreational and tourist use of the peninsula. They believe that the chosen locations for proposed facilities in the Port Bonython and Point Lowly area present unacceptable compromises, and thus have recommended a number of alternatives.

== Advocacy ==
The Alternative Port Working Party (APWP) began as an offshoot of another community action group called the Cuttlefish Coast Coalition, which sought to preserve the marine environment around Point Lowly. Since its formation, the Alternative Port Working Party has focused their efforts on identifying alternative locations for a number of industrial proposals planned for what has been referred to by the Government of South Australia as the Port Bonython Minerals Precinct.

The APWP believes that a proposed iron ore export facility could be relocated 30 km south of Whyalla at Nonowie Station, and has been advocating for this since at least February 2009. The group also maintains that a diesel importation and distribution hub failed to consider implications for the marine environment and could be relocated closer to Whyalla at a more appropriate site and that a large scale reverse osmosis seawater desalination plant for the Olympic Dam mine could 'open the floodgates for the industrialization of Point Lowly.'

The group is concerned that a loss in tourism visitation will adversely impact Whyalla's economy should industrialization plans proceed near Point Lowly, and that the area could be considered an emerging 'tourism hotspot'.

The group has given public presentations, lobbied and written submissions to local and State government since at least 2009 and encouraged locals to respond formally to published Environmental Impact Statements. As of 2014, the APWP continues to convey its views in local and statewide media.
