= Middleback Range =

Mountain range in South Australia

- Location within South Australia

Geography
- Location: Eyre Peninsula
- Country: Australia
- State: South Australia
- Range coordinates: 33°00′S 137°08′E

The Middleback Range is a mountain range on the eastern side of Eyre Peninsula in South Australia. The Middleback Range has been a source of iron ore for over a century, particularly to feed the Whyalla Steelworks. Mines in the region were first developed by BHP from the 1890s and are now owned and operated by Liberty House Group.

== Geography ==
The Middleback Range extends from Iron Knob at the northern end near the Eyre Highway to the Lincoln Highway, halfway between Whyalla and Cowell at its southern extent.

The Ironstone Hill Conservation Park is immediately west of the southern part of the ranges.

== Geology ==
The Middleback Range is part of the Cleve Subdomain of the Gawler craton. The iron ore deposits are primarily of Early Proterozoic metasediments of the Hutchison Group.

== Mining ==
All of the mines in the Middleback Range are operated as open pit mines, producing magnetite and hematite ores. Magnetite is processed at Whyalla, and hematite is exported. The mines are serviced by the BHP Whyalla Tramway, a 3 ft 6 in (1,067 mm) railway which convey the ore to Whyalla's port and steelworks. As of 2016, the operating mines of the Middleback Range are: Iron Duchess, Iron Knight, Iron Duke, Iron Magnet, Iron Baron and Iron Chieftain.

Iron ore mines in the Middleback Range include:

- Iron Knob
- Iron Monarch
- Iron Prince
- Iron Princess
- Iron Baron
- Iron Queen
- Iron Cavalier
- Iron Chieftain
- Iron Duke
- Iron Duchess
- Iron Magnet
