= Cowell (surname) =

Cowell /ˈkaʊəl/ is an English language surname.

== People ==
Notable people with this surname include:

- Andy Cowell (born 1969), British Formula 1 engineer
- Brady Cowell (1899–1989), American college sports coach
- Brendan Cowell (born 1976), Australian actor, screenwriter and director
- Butch Cowell (1887–1940), American coach and administrator in college athletics, brother of Roland
- Cressida Cowell (born 1966), English children's author, known for novel How to Train Your Dragon
- Damian Cowell (born c. 1960s), Australian musician
- Edward Byles Cowell (1826–1903), professor of Sanskrit at Cambridge University
- Elizabeth Cowell (1912–1998), British broadcaster and television announcer
- Sir Ernest Marshall Cowell (1886–1971), British surgeon and military officer
- Frank Cowell, professor at the London School of Economics and Political Science
- Henry Cowell (1897–1965), American composer
- John Cowell (disambiguation), several people
- Joseph Cowell (1792–1863), British actor and painter
- Lowell Cowell (1945–2018), former NASCAR Cup Series driver
- Nicholas Cowell (born 1961), British estate agent and businessman
- Philip Herbert Cowell (1870–1949), British astronomer
- Roberta Cowell (1918–2011), British racing driver and fighter pilot; first known British transsexual woman to undergo sex reassignment surgery
- Roland Cowell (1895–1953), American coach and administrator in college athletics, brother of Butch
- Sam Cowell (1820–1864), British actor and singer of comical songs
- Sammy Cowell (born 1991), Thai actress and model
- Samuel Cowell (1801–1875), English businessman and printer based in Ipswich
- Simon Cowell (born 1959), British record producer and impresario, known for Britain's Got Talent and other shows
- Simon Cowell (conservationist) (1952–2024), British conservationist and TV presenter
- Stanley Cowell (1941–2020), American jazz pianist and founder of the Strata-East Records label
- Theodore Robert Cowell, birth name of Ted Bundy (1946–1989), American serial killer, kidnapper, rapist and necrophile
- Tony Cowell (born 1950), British radio broadcaster and author

== See also ==
- Cowell (disambiguation)
- Cavell (disambiguation)
