= Cowell =

Cowell may refer to:

== People ==
- Cowell (surname), surname origin, and people named Cowell

== Places ==
- Cowell College, California, United States
- Henry Cowell Redwoods State Park, United States
- Cowell, South Australia, Australia
- Cowell, Concord, California, United States

== Ships ==
- USS Cowell, the name of several ships

== See also ==
- Cawl, a Welsh soup or broth
