= USS Cowell =

Three ships of the United States Navy have been named Cowell, after John G. Cowell.

- USS Cowell (DD-139), was renamed Ward prior to launching.
- USS Cowell (DD-167), a Wickes-class destroyer, launched in 1918 and decommissioned in 1940.
- USS Cowell (DD-547), a Fletcher-class destroyer, launched in 1943 and decommissioned in 1971.
