= Entrance Island (South Australia) =

Island in South Australia

Coordinates: 33°43′3.79″S 136°58′13.6″E

Geography
- Location: Spencer Gulf

Administration
- Australia

Entrance Island is a low island located inside the mouth of Franklin Harbor, Eyre Peninsula in South Australia. The island comprises approximately 100 hectares (250 acres), and falls within the boundaries of the Franklin Harbor Conservation Park and Franklin Harbor Marine Park. Its maximum elevation is approximately 4 metres. The island provides roosting and nesting habitat for a variety of sea and shorebird species.

On September 23, 1910, some shearers working on Entrance Island observed a distressed whale reported to be 90 feet long. It had become stranded at low tide, and it escaped when the tide rose. Smaller southern right whales have also been observed from Entrance Island.
