= Lucky Bay, South Australia =

Lucky Bay South Australia
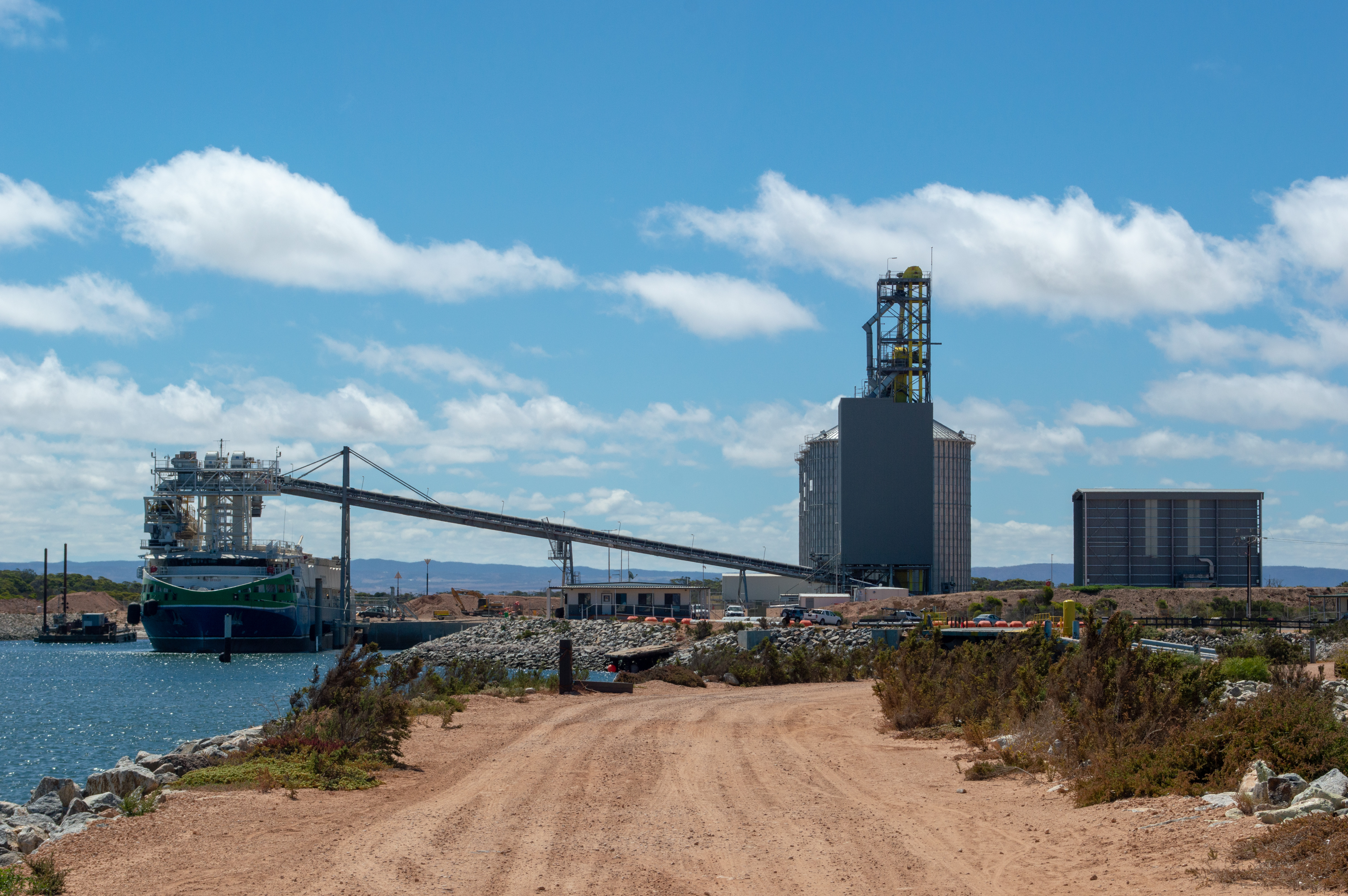
- Lucky Bay Ferry Terminal

- Coordinates: 33.703°S 137.035°E
- Population: 15 (SAL 2021)
- Established: 1998
- Postcode(s): 5602
- Time zone: ACST (UTC+9:30)
  - Summer (DST): ACST (UTC+10:30)
- Location: 198 km (123 mi) NW of Adelaide
- LGA(s): District Council of Franklin Harbour
- Region: Eyre Western
- County: Jervois
- State electorate(s): Flinders
- Federal division(s): Grey
- Website: Lucky Bay
Localities around Lucky Bay:
		Mitchellville
Cowell	Lucky Bay	Spencer Gulf
	Spencer Gulf	Spencer Gulf

Lucky Bay is a locality in the District Council of Franklin Harbour, on the Spencer Gulf coast of Eyre Peninsula in South Australia. It is a terminus for SeaSA's Spencer Gulf passenger ferry and a transshipping port for grain export operated by T-Ports. Lucky Bay is located immediately north-east of the Franklin Harbour wetlands. Its adjacent waters lie within the outer boundary of the Franklin Harbor Marine Park. A ferry service crossing Spencer Gulf from Lucky Bay to Wallaroo commenced in 2006, and the dirt road connecting Lucky Bay with the Lincoln Highway was sealed in 2008.

== Residential and recreational use ==
A strip of coastal homes or 'shacks' extends along the coast to the north-east of the ferry terminal. Several of these are available to rent. Beach-launching boat access exists for residents and holiday-makers. The adjacent waters are popular among fishermen, with snapper being one of the region's prized catches.

== Spencer Gulf ferry ==
The development of a ferry terminal at Lucky Bay was approved by South Australian planning minister Paul Holloway in November 2005. The ferry service commenced in December 2006 and has been an economic boon to the nearby township of Cowell.

The passenger ferry is operated by Spencer Gulf Searoad and transports vehicles and passengers across Spencer Gulf between Lucky Bay and Wallaroo. The ferry service received an Australian Marine Environment Protection Association (AUSMEPA) award in 2006 "for its potential to save more than 25,000 tonnes of carbon emissions annually from road traffic by providing a cross-Gulf alternative to the lengthy round-Gulf car trip."

During its first three years of operation, three different vessels provided the ferry service: MV Seaway, Sea Scape and Sea Spirit. In 2009, the service was suspended.

From February 2012 until September 2014, a purpose-built vessel, the Aurora V, provided the ferry service. It was then suspended to allow the expansion of the harbour's basin and substantial vegetation clearance and earthworks to commence. The ferry service resumed in October 2016 using the vessel Sea Star.

In August 2017, the ferry service was suspended again to allow for further construction works at Lucky Bay harbour. In 2019, SeaSA advised that their vessel, the Aurora V which had been sold to a Venezuelan then bought back again, was stuck in Venezuela due to problems arising from political instability there.

The ferry service resumed in November 2020 using the vessel Aurora V. The ship sails under the Spencer Gulf Searoad business name. The ferry service was suspended in late June and is expected to resume in late July after maintenance work on the vessel undertaken at Port Adelaide.

== Harbour expansion ==
Between 2011 and 2018 various plans to expand the Lucky Bay passenger ferry terminal to facilitate new transshipment facilities were proposed and approved. The first of these was a proposal to accommodate shipments of iron ore, followed by a plan to export wheat in 2016. The Australian Government contributed $2.2 million to the project via the Regional Development Australia's Regional Development Fund.

Under the SA Government's Eyre Peninsula Grain Growers Rail Fund, Sea Transport Developments SA Pty Ltd received a $90,000 grant to undertake a range of site design and related assessments for a handling facility for the export of grain.

By October 2016, $20 million had been spent on harbour expansion works, and the basin's depth had been increased to 5.5 metres LAT.

=== Iron ore export plan ===
In April 2011 a proposal to export iron ore from Lucky Bay received Crown-sponsored development status from the Government of South Australia, under Section 49 of the state's Development Act 1993. As a result, development proposal documentation was withdrawn from the general public after a three-week open period calling for submissions.

One of the responsible parties, Ironclad Mining had previously sought government approval to haul ore from Wilcherry Hill via road to a rail siding at Lincoln Gap near Whyalla. From there it was to be transported to Port Adelaide by rail, then loaded onto ships using existing infrastructure there. This export corridor was approved by the Federal government on 23 September 2011, under the Environment Protection and Biodiversity Conservation Act 1999. A week later, Ironclad Mining lodged a formal Development Application to expand the existing ferry terminal at Lucky Bay and export iron ore from there.

On 5 April 2012, the Lucky Bay proposal was approved by Robert Kleeman, acting as a delegate for the South Australian Minister for Planning. The project's proponents continued to refine the design of the facility, and lodged several amendments to the proposal the following year, including plans to add a buffer storage facility (iron ore stockpiles) and relocate transshipping points closer to shore.

On 3 December 2013, the revised proposal which included multiple cost-saving variations received State Government development approval. The project involved the following entities: SeaSA, Masterplan, Ironclad Mining Ltd and the District Council of Franklin Harbour. While the project claimed to offer a Common User Export Facility, there was one named future user of the port at the time: Ironclad Mining Ltd.

Ironclad Mining claimed that delays associated with project amendments and approvals cost the company approximately $6 million. The iron ore export proposal did not proceed.

=== Wheat export plan ===
A change of direction for the project saw the emergence of Free Eyre Ltd's interest in exporting grain from Lucky Bay. The group expected the facility would be ready to transship grain by the 2015 harvest, but this did not eventuate.

In early 2016, a formal proposal to construct facilities to support the transshipment of wheat was considered and approved by the Development Assessment Commission.

In July 2016, the port's owners, Spencer Gulf Trust, announced that it expected the new facilities to be operable for the 2017 harvest.

In May 2017, The Advertiser reported that a consortium which includes Inheritance Capital Asset Management (ICAM) and Duxton Capital was raising investment in the port development. Rob Chapman and commodities expert Ed Peter are part of the consortium. In 2018, the company T-Ports was established with four founding shareholders: ACIF, ICAM, Duxton Asset Management and Sea Transport.

By March 2018, outer channel dredging works had been approved and the project timeline had been revised. The harbour was expected to be ready to export grain following the 2018 harvest. The proposed construction included storage at Lucky Bay for 430,000 tonnes of grain and an additional 150,000 tonnes at Lock. The grain will be transferred to a custom-built trans-ship to carry it out to larger ships in deeper water.

The new process is expected to be capable of loading a Panamax vessel in 3 days. The purpose-built MV Lucky Eyre arrived in March 2020 to serve as the transshipment vessel. Its owners consider it a "world first" vessel as it provides a self-propelled, self-discharging transhipment solution. The larger ships will be anchored 5 nautical miles (9.3 km; 5.8 mi) offshore. The transfer ship is 87 metres (285 ft) long and can transfer up to 13,800 tonnes per day. It will undergo a three-stage commissioning process before entering service.

=== Commissioning (2019-2020) ===
The first load of wheat arrived at the storage facility at Lucky Bay in October 2019 and the purpose-built MV Lucky Eyre arrived from China in late March 2020 for dry and wet commissioning. The vessel has a reported draft of 4.2 metres, travels at an average speed of 7.2 knots and can carry a cargo of 3,300 tonnes of grain. Sea Transport claims that the vessel is capable of loading 10,800 to 13,250 tonnes of grain per day in "good weather".

The Maritime Union of Australia has unsuccessfully attempted to meet with T-Ports to discuss concerns they have over the operation's compliance and safety given the exposed nature of the transshipping location within Spencer Gulf.

On 31 March, the bulk carrier Wave Friend was being loaded at the transshipping point directly south of Lucky Bay within the Franklin Harbor Marine Park. She has a draft of 8.1 metres and a carrying capacity of 28368 DWT.

The port was officially opened in April 2020 and was expected to make its first exports in summer 2020–21. The proponents of the project, T-Ports Pty Ltd are represented to the South Australian parliament by lobbyist and former politician, Christopher Pyne, though his firm Pyne and Partners. The silos that store the grain near the waterfront were manufactured in South Australia by Ahrens.

In December 2021, the project's owner ICAM Duxton Port Infrastructure Trust (IDPIT) announced it would receive $40 million in a refinancing deal with Merricks Capital.

== Environment ==
The region is adjacent to the Franklin Harbour wetlands, and two tidal creeks bracket the shack settlement and recently developed grain-loading facilities. The sand flats, dunes and beaches are home to or visited by many threatened species, including various migratory waders, the banded stilt, hooded plover and white-bellied sea eagle. The white-bellied sea eagle is listed as endangered in South Australia, under the state's National Parks and Wildlife Act 1972. The banded stilt and hooded plover are both listed as vulnerable under the same act.

In 2011, the Eyre Peninsula Coastal Action Plan recommended that coastal flora and fauna surveys be conducted from Lucky Bay eastward to Shoalwater Point in order 'to inform future management directions'. This recommendation was in response to 'very inadequate data on biodiversity and habitat values'. It was flagged as a 'high priority' action to undertake.

=== Franklin Harbor Marine Park ===
Lucky Bay lies within the State-managed Franklin Harbor Marine Park. The park was established in 2009 to protect habitat for the weedy seadragon which is also fully protected under the State's Fisheries Management Act. It is also home to blue swimmer crabs, prawns, King George whiting, sardines and several other commercially important scalefish species. Fishing is permitted within the Franklin Harbor Marine Park's outer boundary, but is prohibited within several Sanctuary Zones. Two Special Purpose Areas exist within the park to allow for the transshipment of bulk commodities between vessels.

=== Environmental threats ===
Development is considered one of several threats to this area, including what was described in 2011 as "a proposed major development that is likely to impact on coastal landforms, habitats and vegetation, as well as increase the visitation, threats and pressure on the coastal areas within the cell if it goes ahead". Environmentalists are concerned that the sound and dust pollution from proposed iron ore exports could disturb birds' established feeding behaviors and roosts. Persons involved with the development listed various mitigation plans to address the problems, and expressed the need to work with bird habitat conservationists.
