= Gowell =

Gowell is both a surname and a given name. Notable people with the name include:

- Larry Gowell (1948–2020), American baseball player
- Gowell Claset (1907–1981), American baseball player

== See also ==
- Cowell (surname)
- Powell (surname)
