= Tyranna =

Tyranna may refer to:

- Tirana, the capital city of Albania
- Tyranna Resources, an Australian company
