= Cosell =

Cosell is a surname. Notable people with the surname include:

- Greg Cosell, American sports analyst
- Howard Cosell (1918–1995), American sports journalist

== See also ==
- Cowell (surname)
