= John Cowell =

John Cowell may refer to:

- John Cowell (jurist) (1554–1611), English jurist
- John G. Cowell (1785–1814), officer in the United States Navy
- John F. Cowell (1852–1915), American botanist
- John Cowell (RAF airman) (1889–1918), Irish World War I flying ace for No. 20 Squadron RAF
- Sir John Clayton Cowell (1832–1894), British Army general and Master of the Queen's Household
- Jack Cowell (1887–?), English footballer
