= Cowell Airport =

- IATA: CCW; ICAO: YCWL

Summary
- Airport type: Public
- Owner/Operator: District Council of Franklin Harbour
- Location: Cowell, South Australia
- Elevation AMSL: 127 ft / 39 m
- Coordinates: 33°40′00″S 136°53′30″E

Map
- Location in South Australia

Runways
Direction	Length		Surface
Direction	m	ft	Surface
04/22	1,188	3,898	Gravel
12/30	1,057	3,468	Clay/sand
17/35	1,472	4,829	Clay/sand
- Sources: Australian AIP

Cowell Airport (IATA: CCW, ICAO: YCWL) is an airport located 2 nautical miles (3.7 km; 2.3 mi) northwest of Cowell, in the Eyre Peninsula region of South Australia. The primary runway, 04/22 is equipped with runway lights to facilitate night operations. While there are no terminal facilities at the airport, a public telephone and toilet block are available.

== See also ==
- List of airports in South Australia
