= Cowell Area School =

All-grades public school in Cowell, South Australia

Coordinates: 33°41′S 136°55′E

- Cowell; South Australia

Information
- Type: R–12 Government Public school

Cowell Area School is an R–12 Government Public school in Cowell, a small coastal town 494 km away from Adelaide, South Australia in the District Council of Franklin Harbour district. The school now has about 190 students, with a capacity of up to 300. The school is highly supported by the local community which works mainly in farming, aquaculture and mining. The school owns an oyster lease and runs a significant Aquaculture Skills Centre.

== Facilities ==
The Cowell School Community Library is located at the school, jointly funded by the school and the District Council of Franklin Harbour. The Library has free wifi available to the community and travellers.

The Cowell Early Childhood Centre, offering preschool education and childcare for children aged 0–5, is also located on the school grounds.

The school has recently undergone a massive $4 million redevelopment that saw the new specialist areas for science, art, and home economics built. The redevelopment also saw many of the teaching classrooms rebuilt. The new buildings have a distinctive blue colour. The school also has its own oyster lease, out on the Franklin Harbour, where they grow their own oysters, which are sold locally and internationally. The school also has a boarding house which is currently unused.

== See also ==
- List of schools in South Australia
