= Mitchellville, South Australia =

Mitchellville
- Suburb
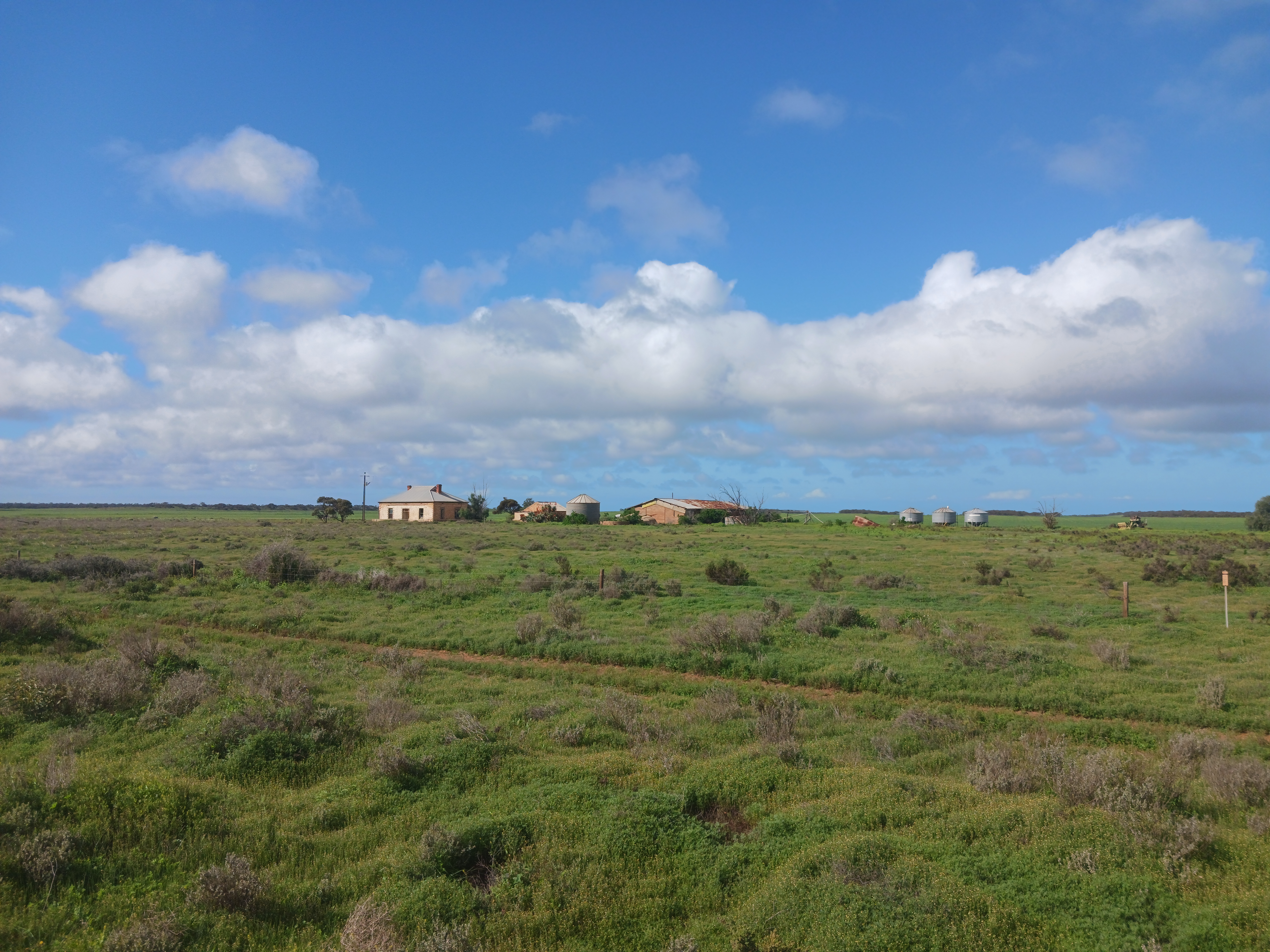
- A farm in Mitchellville, South Australia, in July 2026

- Coordinates: 33°36′27″S 137°09′07″E
- Country: Australia
- State: South Australia
- Region: Eyre Western
- LGA: District Council of Franklin Harbour
- Location: 198 km (123 mi) north-west of Adelaide; 23 km (14 mi) north of Cowell
- Established: 1998

Government
  - State electorate: Flinders
  - Federal division: Grey

Population
  - Total: 21 (SAL 2021)
- Time zone: UTC+9:30 (ACST)
  - Summer (DST): UTC+10:30 (ACST)
- Postcode: 5602
- County: Jervois
- Mean max temp: 22.6 °C (72.7 °F)
- Mean min temp: 11.5 °C (52.7 °F)
- Annual rainfall: 359.6 mm (14.16 in)
Suburbs around Mitchellville
Minbrie	Midgee	Spencer Gulf
Minbrie; Cowell	Mitchellville	Spencer Gulf
Cowell; Lucky Bay	Lucky Bay; Spencer Gulf	Spencer Gulf
- Distances; Coordinates; Climate; Adjoining suburbs

Mitchellville is a locality in the Australian state of South Australia located on the east coast of Eyre Peninsula about 198 kilometres (123 miles) north-west of the state capital of Adelaide and about 23 kilometres (14 miles) north of the municipal seat of Cowell.

Its boundaries were created in 1998 in respect to the “low established name” which is derived from John Mitchell which was an "early settler" in the area.

Land use in Mitchellville is divided between primary industry and conservation with the former being represented by “broadacre farming of cereals and livestock” and the latter being represented by the zoning of the land adjoining the coastline with Spencer Gulf.

Mitchellville is located within the federal division of Grey, the state electoral district of Flinders and the local government area of the District Council of Franklin Harbour.
