= USS Cowell (DD-167) =

Wickes-class destroyer

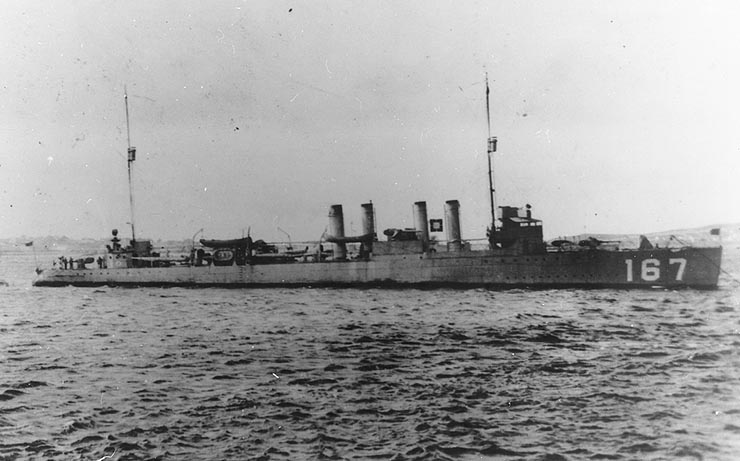
- USS Cowell (DD-167)

History

United States
- Name: USS Cowell
- Namesake: John G. Cowell
- Builder: Fore River Shipyard, Quincy, Massachusetts
- Laid down: 15 July 1918
- Launched: 23 November 1918
- Commissioned: 17 March 1919
- Decommissioned: 27 June 1922
- Commissioned: 17 June 1940
- Decommissioned: 23 September 1940
- Identification: Hull number: DD-167
- Fate: Transferred to United Kingdom, 23 September 1940

United Kingdom
- Name: HMS Brighton
- Commissioned: 23 September 1940
- Identification: Pennant number: I08
- Fate: Transferred to USSR, 16 July 1944

Soviet Union
- Name: Zharky (Жаркий / Torrid)
- Acquired: 16 July 1944
- Fate: Returned to United Kingdom for scrapping, 28 February 1949

General characteristics
- Class & type: Wickes-class destroyer
- Displacement: 1,060 tons
- Length: 314 ft 5 in (95.83 m)
- Beam: 31 ft 9 in (9.68 m)
- Draft: 9 ft 2 in (2.79 m)
- Speed: 35 kn (65 km/h; 40 mph)
- Complement: 101 officers and enlisted
- Armament: 4 x 4 in (102 mm)/50 guns; 4 x 21 inch (533 mm) torpedo tubes

The first USS Cowell (DD–167) was a Wickes-class destroyer in the United States Navy during World War I. She was transferred to the Royal Navy as HMS Brighton, and later to the Soviet Navy as Zharky. (Note: Alternate spelling Zharkiy)

== As USS Cowell ==
Named for John G. Cowell, she was launched on 23 November 1918 by Fore River Shipbuilding Company, Quincy, Massachusetts; sponsored by Miss E. P. Garney; and commissioned on 17 March 1919.

Cowell cleared Boston, Massachusetts, 3 May 1919, to take station at Trepassey Bay, Newfoundland, first stopping point for the Navy seaplanes which that month began the historic first aerial crossing of the Atlantic. After patrolling her station, she returned to Boston 22 May to prepare for European service, and on 30 June sailed from New York to join the American naval force in the Adriatic. Here she served as dispatch ship for the Allied Peace Commission, and as station ship at Croatian (then in Kingdom of Serbs, Croats and Slovenes ports of Rijeka, Split, and Trogir, in turn until 23 October, in support of the allied occupation of the eastern Adriatic, when she cleared for home.

In reserve at Boston and Charleston from 1 December 1919, Cowell put to sea for a training period out of Newport, Rhode Island, with a reserve organization from April through October 1921, returning to Charleston. On 27 June 1922, she was decommissioned at Philadelphia Navy Yard, where she lay until recommissioned 17 June 1940 for patrol duty in the Atlantic. She cruised along the United States East Coast on this duty until 18 September 1940 when she arrived at Halifax, Nova Scotia, there to be decommissioned 23 September 1940 and transferred to the Royal Navy the same day in the land bases for destroyers exchange.

== As HMS Brighton ==
Commissioned as HMS Brighton, the destroyer served with minelayers in the Denmark Strait and off the Faroe Islands. On 27 February 1941, she rescued from the sea 19 survivors of torpedoed SS Baltisan. Brighton was modified for trade convoy escort service by removal of three of the original 4"/50 caliber guns and one of the triple torpedo tube mounts to reduce topside weight for additional depth charge stowage and installation of Hedgehog. After refit, she served during 1943 and 1944 as target ship for naval aircraft training in the Western Approaches and at Rosyth, Scotland.

== As Zharky ==
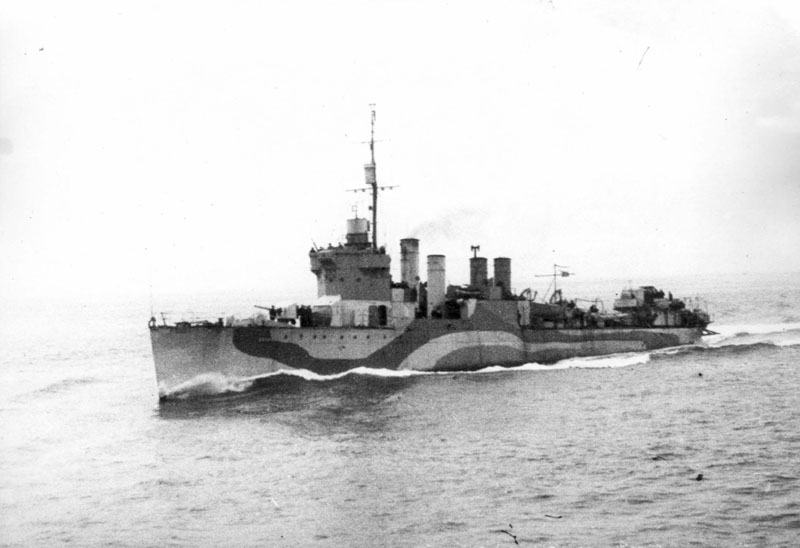
Soviet destroyer Zharky

On 16 July 1944 she was transferred to Russia, in whose Navy she served as Zharky (rus. Жаркий, "Torrid") (Note: Alternate spelling Zharkiy) until returned to the British at Rosyth 28 February 1949. She was sold for scrap on 5 April 1949.
