= USS Cowell (DD-547) =

Fletcher-class destroyer

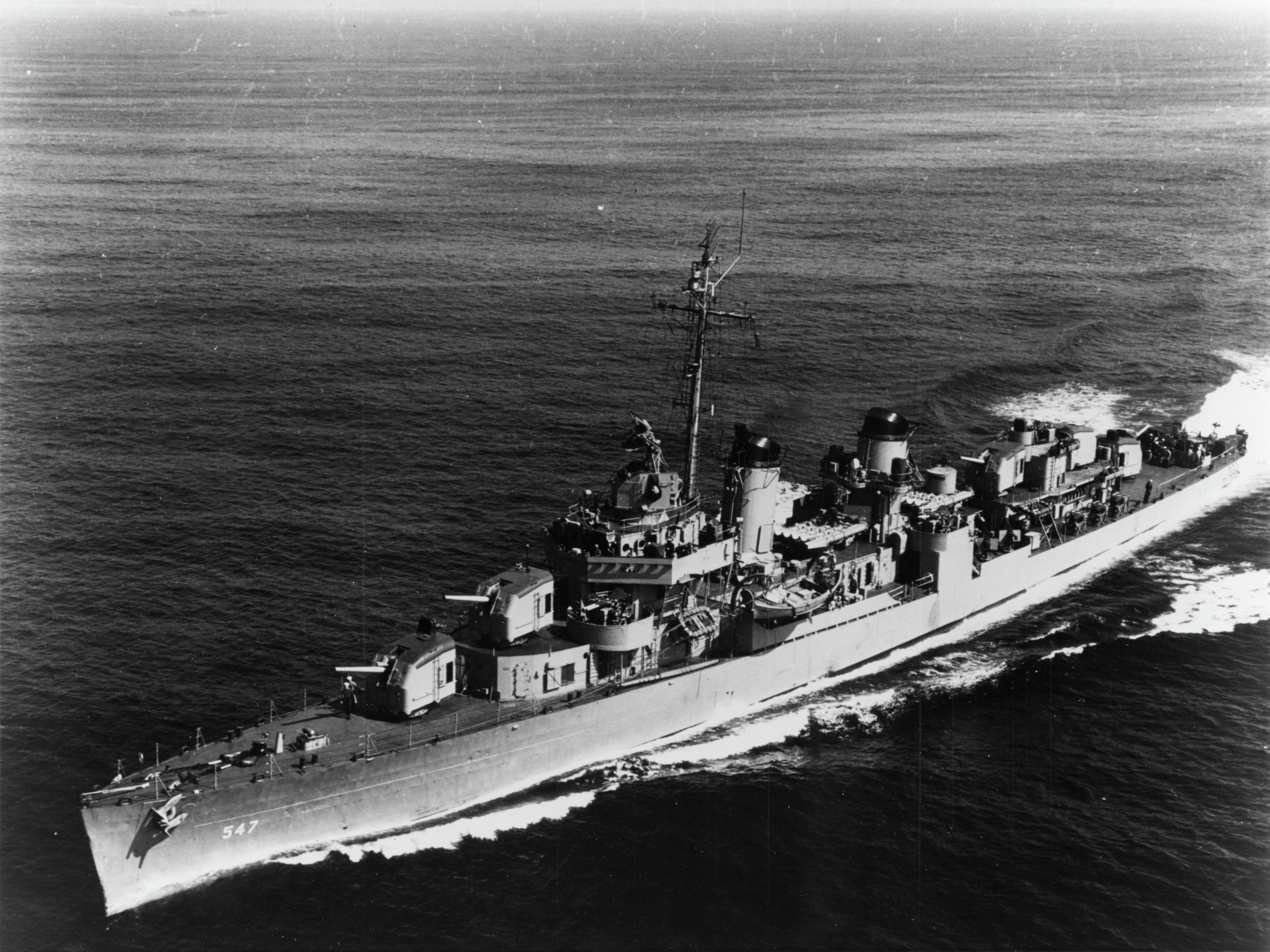
- USS Cowell (DD-547) underway, c. 1951

History

United States
- Namesake: John G. Cowell
- Builder: Bethlehem Shipbuilding Corporation, San Pedro, California
- Laid down: 7 September 1942
- Launched: 18 March 1943
- Commissioned: 23 August 1943
- Decommissioned: 17 August 1971
- Stricken: 17 August 1971
- Fate: Transferred to Argentina, 17 August 1971

History

Argentina
- Name: Almirante Storni
- Acquired: 17 August 1971
- Stricken: 1982
- Fate: Scrapped, 1982

General characteristics
- Class & type: Fletcher-class destroyer
- Displacement: 2,050 long tons (2,080 t)
- Length: 376 ft 6 in (114.8 m)
- Beam: 39 ft 8 in (12.1 m)
- Draft: 17 ft 9 in (5.4 m)
- Propulsion: 60,000 shp (45 MW); 2 propellers
- Speed: 35 knots (65 km/h; 40 mph)
- Range: 6,500 nmi (12,000 km) at 15 knots (28 km/h)
- Complement: 273
- Armament: 5 × single Mk 12 5 in (127 mm)/38 guns; 5 × twin 40 mm (1.6 in) Bofors AA guns; 7 × single 20 mm (0.8 in) Oerlikon AA guns; 2 × quintuple 21 in (533 mm) torpedo tubes; 6 × single depth charge throwers; 2 × depth charge racks

USS Cowell (DD-547), a Fletcher-class destroyer, was the second ship of the United States Navy to be named for John G. Cowell (1785–1814).

Built by Bethlehem Steel Cowell was launched on 18 March 1943 and commissioned into the USN on 23 August 1943.

In 1971 it was transferred to the Argentinian navy becoming Almirante Storni. It was scrapped in 1982.

== Central Pacific campaigns ==
Sailing from San Pedro 28 October 1943, Cowell arrived at Pearl Harbor 2 November to join the Fast Carrier Task Force (then TF 58, later TF 38). From 10 November to 13 December she screened the carriers as they launched air attacks during the invasion of the Gilbert Islands, then sailed from Espiritu Santo for strikes on Kavieng, New Ireland at the turn of the year; and on Kwajalein, Ebeye, and Eniwetok Islands at the close of January. Returning to Majuro, she put to sea for the strike on Truk of 16 and 17 February 1944, then sailed to Pearl Harbor to replenish.

Cowell returned to Majuro 22 March 1944 and rejoined TF 58 for the strikes on Palau, Yap and Ulithi of 30 March to 1 April; the invasion of Hollandia from 21 to 23 April; and the raids on Truk, Satawan and Ponape of 29 April to 1 May. After the air attacks on Marcus Island and Wake Island from 19 to 23 May, Cowell continued to screen the carriers during the Marianas operation. She sortied from her base at Majuro from 6 June to 14 July for strikes on Guam and Rota, raids to neutralize Japanese bases in the Bonins, and to give protective antiaircraft cover for the carriers in the Battle of the Philippine Sea on 19 and 20 June.

After an overhaul at Eniwetok, Cowell put to sea 29 August 1944 with Task Group 36.5 (TG 38.5) for air strikes on the western Carolines, the Philippines and the Palaus, and the Manila and Subic Bay area, as well as to support the landings on Morotai on 15 September. She arrived at Manus on 28 September to replenish, then sortied 2 October supporting air strikes on Okinawa, Luzon, and Formosa preparing for the Leyte assault. When Canberra and Houston were torpedoed in heavy Japanese air attacks on 13 and 14 October, Cowell stood by to furnish light, power, and pumping facilities as the cripples slowly retired from the danger area. She rejoined her task force to sail for the far-flung Battle for Leyte Gulf, and aircraft from her carriers were in time to launch telling strikes against the retreating Japanese ships. Cowell returned to Ulithi 28 October for patrol and training duty until 26 December when she sailed for Seattle and an overhaul.

== Battle of Okinawa ==
Returning to action, Cowell sailed from Saipan 27 March 1945 for the invasion of Okinawa. She covered the diversionary landings during the assault on 1 April, then took up the radar picket duty which was to bring her a Presidential Unit Citation (US). Until 20 June Cowell braved the hazards of the picket line to direct combat air patrol successfully and to shoot down her own share of Japanese aircraft with antiaircraft fire. On at least three occasions skillful maneuvering, accurate fire and courage saved Cowell from severe damage. On 4 May she shot down two planes within 50 feet of the ship, receiving a shower of gasoline and burning debris, then aided Gwin by firing on another kamikaze. On 13 May Cowell fired on several attacking planes, then brought firefighting and medical assistance to the stricken Bache, screening her from further attack. In another attack on 25 May Cowell shot down a diving kamikaze which exploded in midair scattering shell fragments and its cockpit door on Cowell's deck and causing small fires. Relieved of picket duty 20 June, Cowell joined TG 32.15 to patrol off Okinawa in the East China Sea. On 22 July she sent rescue and fire-fighting parties to aid Marathon.

Cowell sailed from Okinawa 20 September 1945 to support the occupation landings at Matsuyama. She cleared for home from Nagoya 31 October and arrived at San Diego 17 November, where Cowell was placed out of commission in reserve 22 July 1946.

== 1951 – 1960 ==
Recommissioned 21 September 1951, Cowell was assigned to the Atlantic Fleet, and sailed from San Diego 4 January 1952 to arrive at Norfolk, Virginia 19 January. She joined in fleet exercises and training, then sailed from Norfolk 7 January 1953 for the Far East. She joined TF 77 off Korea on patrol, then operated with British ships in the West Coast Blockade Force. She escorted Missouri to a bombardment of the east coast of Korea, then joined TG 95.2 for shore bombardment in Wonsan Harbor, minesweeping and coastal patrols. She cleared Sasebo 26 June to complete her cruise around the world calling at Manila, and passing through the Indian Ocean, the Suez Canal and the Mediterranean Sea to return to Norfolk 22 August. From 4 September to 23 November she conducted local hunter-killer exercises, then cruised the Atlantic and Mediterranean for like operations from 4 January to 11 March 1954.

Cowell cleared Norfolk 7 January 1955 and arrived at Long Beach 28 January to join the Pacific Fleet. During her 1955 tour of duty in the western Pacific, she joined in guided missile exercises en route to Pearl Harbor, served as plane guard for Essex, served on the Taiwan Patrol, and participated in hunter-killer exercises with TF 77. Cowell returned to the Far East for similar duty annually through 1960, joining in exercises and training from Long Beach when not deployed.

In addition to the Presidential Unit Citation, Cowell received 11 battle stars for World War II service and two for Korean War service.

== ARA Almirante Storni ==
On 17 August 1971, the ship was decommissioned, stricken from the U.S. Naval Vessel Register, and transferred to Argentina. She served in the Argentine Navy as ARA Almirante Storni.

In October 1975, the British Government tasked Lord Shackleton (son of the Antarctic explorer Sir Ernest Shackleton) with an economic survey of the Falkland Islands. The Argentine Government reacted furiously and refused permission for Shackleton to travel via Argentina. Later, on 4 February 1976, the ship transporting Shackleton to the islands, the RRS Shackleton, was fired upon by the Almirante Storni. In 1982, she was stricken and scrapped.
