= Smart & Smarter =

- The Simpsons episode
- Episode no.: Season 15; Episode 13
- Directed by: Steven Dean Moore
- Written by: Carolyn Omine
- Production code: FABF09
- Original air date: February 22, 2004

Guest appearance
- Simon Cowell as Henry

Episode features
- Couch gag: The living room is a moving rack seen in dry cleaning shops, with the Simpsons in five dry-cleaning bags.
- Commentary: Al Jean; Carolyn Omine; Matt Selman; Tim Long; Tom Gammill; Max Pross; Joel H. Cohen; Steven Dean Moore

Episode chronology
← Previous "Milhouse Doesn't Live Here Anymore"	Next → "The Ziff Who Came to Dinner"
- The Simpsons season 15

"Smart & Smarter" is the thirteenth episode of the fifteenth season of the American animated television series The Simpsons. It originally aired on the Fox network in the United States on February 22, 2004. This episode was written by Carolyn Omine and directed by Steven Dean Moore.

In this episode, when Maggie takes an IQ test, she is informed that she may be smarter than Lisa, who worries that her life will go nowhere. Simon Cowell guest starred as Henry. The episode received mixed reviews.

== Plot ==
The family visits Wickerbottom's Pre-Nursery School, where Apu and Manjula are sending two of their octuplets. Homer and Marge have a talk with Dr. Hibbert about getting in, and decide to have Maggie go in. However, Maggie fails the initial screening because she cannot talk, until Lisa discovers some traits of intelligence. Henry accepts Maggie after the second screening. The results show that not only is Maggie brilliant, but her IQ of 167 is higher than Lisa's IQ of 159. Lisa is no longer considered "the smart one" of the Simpson family, much to her chagrin. Lisa attempts to prove everyone that she is smarter than Maggie and tries to teach Maggie false information. However, Marge, realizing this, scolds her for trying to sabotage her sister's education and that if that is how she really feels, then she should not be her sister's role model.

After having a nightmare, Lisa leaves the house and hides in the Natural History Museum, where there is no chance of Homer and Marge finding her, until Chief Wiggum, Lou and Eddie find her belongings in there. The family goes into the human body exhibit, but Maggie gets distracted and accidentally presses the swallow button, swallowing Homer, Marge and Bart. Maggie presses many buttons until she finally presses the evacuate button, following a visual cue from an apologetic Lisa as to its red color.

After the family returns home and wonders why Maggie didn't press the red button until Lisa told her to, Henry arrives, having been let in by Moe posing as a butler, and tells the family Maggie is no longer welcome at the school. The family watches a video tape of Maggie's audition and it turns out Lisa was showing her answers, which Lisa does not remember doing, but it is explained she subconsciously did that as she wanted Maggie to succeed. Henry starts criticizing Maggie which leads an angry Homer to start punching him, while Henry criticizes his punches until he is knocked unconscious.

In the end, Lisa assures Maggie she does not care what anyone else thinks of her and that she is brilliant to her. However, Maggie plays Lisa's saxophone perfectly, showing another sign of intelligence. A shocked Lisa reclaims her saxophone and tells her that it is "not for babies".

In the credits, Simon Cowell criticizes everyone who had worked on the show. On the Gracie Films logo, Cowell said "Oh, shush yourself".

== Production ==
Television personality Simon Cowell guest starred as Henry. Cowell's character is a parody of someone like him but not a parody of himself. Cowell said, "It's genuinely my favourite programme. When I got the telephone call I thought it was a wind-up but it was true". He was "very proud" to appear in the episode and found the work "intimidating". His only demand was his character would appear young and handsome. Cowell recorded his part in June 2003 in London. He later appeared as himself in the twenty-first season episode "Judge Me Tender".

== Cultural references ==
Lisa's black and white nightmare of her pushing Maggie down the stairs in a wheelchair is a reference to the 1962 film What Ever Happened to Baby Jane?. The instrumental version of the song playing during the scenes where Lisa is walking around the museum is "Moon River" from the 1961 film Breakfast at Tiffany's.

== Reception ==
=== Viewing figures ===
The episode earned a 4.6 rating and was watched by 12.6 million viewers, which was the 25th most-watched show that week.

=== Critical response ===
On Four Finger Discount, Guy Davis and Brendan Dando thought the episode was "very enjoyable" but thought the premise could have occurred in any live action comedy episode with no advantage of animation.

Colin Jacobson of DVD Movie Guide thought it was a "solid" Lisa episode but had a similar premise as the sixth season episode "Lisa's Rival".
