= Franklin Harbor Marine Park =

Protected area in South Australia

- Location within South Australia
- Location: South Australia
- Nearest city: Cowell
- Coordinates: 33.67°S 137.22°E
- Established: 29 January 2009
- Governing body: Department of Environment and Water
- Website: Official website

Franklin Harbor Marine Park is a marine park in Spencer Gulf in South Australia. It is adjacent and overlapping with Franklin Harbor Conservation Park.

The park includes Franklin Harbor and is located on the western side of Spencer Gulf between Gibbon Point (at the southern end of Port Gibbon) and the Munyaroo Conservation Park. The park contains different zones, some of which are sanctuary areas, but most of the park permits recreational fishing and non-motorised boating. Wildlife in the sanctuary includes King George whiting, sea dragons, other fish and invertebrate sea life, Australian sea lions and migratory birds.

Two Special Purpose Areas exist within the park to allow for the transshipment of bulk commodities between vessels. These are used to export grain from Lucky Bay.

== See also ==
- Protected areas of South Australia
