= Simon Cowell =

English reality television judge, television producer and music executive (born 1959)

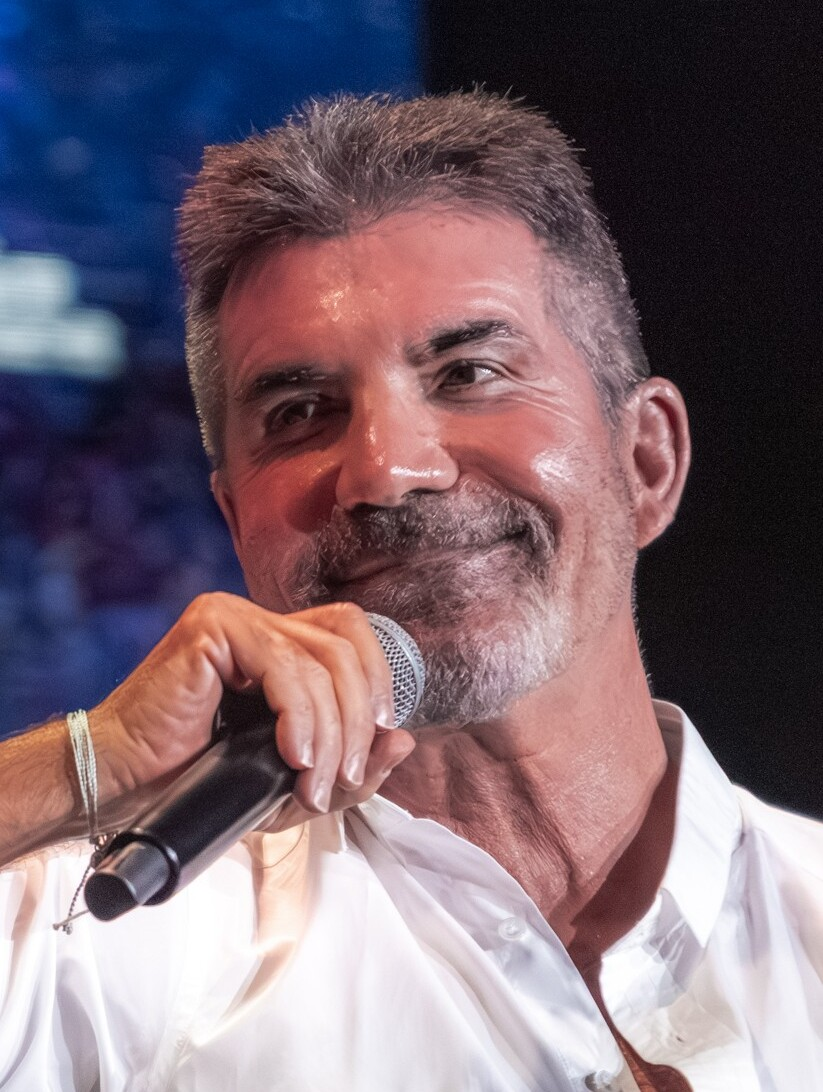
- Cowell in 2026
- Born: Simon Phillip Cowell; 7 October 1959 (age 67); London, England
- Occupations: Television personality; record executive; businessman; producer
- Years active: 1980–present
- Organisation: Syco Entertainment
- Label: Syco Music
- Television: The X Factor; Got Talent
- Partner(s): Lauren Silverman (2013–present; engaged)
- Children: 1
- Relatives: Nicholas Cowell (brother); Tony Cowell (half-brother)
- Website: simoncowell.co

Simon Phillip Cowell (/ˈkaʊəl/; born 7 October 1959) is an English television personality, record executive, businessman, and producer. He has judged on the British television talent competition shows Pop Idol (2001–2003), The X Factor (2004–2010; 2014–2018), and Britain's Got Talent (2007–present), as well as the American television talent competition shows American Idol (2002–2010), The X Factor (2011–2013), and America's Got Talent (2016–present). Cowell is the founder and owner of the British entertainment company Syco Entertainment and its record label Syco Music. He is the creator of the X Factor and Got Talent television franchises.

After some success in the 1980s and 1990s as a record producer, talent agent and consultant in the British music industry, Cowell came to public prominence in 2001 as a judge on Pop Idol, a television show which he and its creator Simon Fuller successfully pitched to ITV Controller of Entertainment Claudia Rosencrantz. Cowell is known for making blunt, critical and controversial comments as a television music and talent show judge, including insults and wisecracks about contestants and their singing abilities. Through his work in television and the music industry, he has been involved in launching and developing the careers of a number of commercially successful recording artists and groups including Little Mix, Fifth Harmony, One Direction, Susan Boyle, Leona Lewis, Westlife, and Il Divo.

In 2004 and 2010, Time named Cowell one of the 100 most influential people in the world. In 2006, the British public ranked him number 28 in ITV's poll of TV's 50 Greatest Stars, and in 2008, The Daily Telegraph ranked him sixth in their list of the "100 most powerful people in British culture". In 2008, he received the Special Recognition Award at the National Television Awards. At the 2010 British Academy Television Awards, Cowell received the BAFTA Special Award for his "outstanding contribution to the entertainment industry and for his development of new talent". In 2018, he received a star on the Hollywood Walk of Fame in the television category.

== Early life ==
Simon Phillip Cowell was born on 7 October 1959 in Lambeth, London, and raised in Elstree, Hertfordshire. His mother, Julie Brett (née Josie Dalglish, 1925–2015), was a ballet dancer and socialite, and his father, Eric Selig Phillip Cowell (1918–1999), was an estate agent, property developer, and music industry executive. Cowell's father was from a mostly Jewish family (his own mother was born in Poland), though he did not discuss his ancestry with his children. Cowell's mother was from a Christian background. He has a younger brother, Nicholas Cowell; three half brothers, John, Tony, and Michael Cowell; and a half sister, June Cowell.

Cowell attended Radlett Preparatory School, Licensed Victuallers' School in Ascot for one year, and the private Dover College, as did his brother, but left after taking GCE O levels. He passed English Language and Literature and then attended Windsor Technical College, where he gained another GCE in Sociology. Cowell took a few menial jobs—including, according to his brother Tony, working as a runner on Stanley Kubrick's 1980 horror film The Shining—but did not get along well with colleagues and bosses, until his father, who was an executive at EMI Music Publishing, managed to get him a job in the mail room. However, after failing to get a promotion, he left to try out other jobs before returning to EMI.

== Career ==
=== Early career ===
In the early 1980s, Cowell left EMI to form E&S Music with his former boss at EMI but quit in 1983. He then formed Fanfare Records with Iain Burton, initially selling exercise videos, and music from acts such as the Italian orchestra Rondò Veneziano. He had his first hit song in 1986 with "So Macho" by Sinitta. Some of Cowell's early success came through Stock Aitken Waterman, who produced a number of hits in the 1980s. However, in 1989 the company went under, with Pete Waterman forced to put a freeze on Fanfare's assets, and taking Cowell's Porsche as compensation for outstanding production and royalties payments. Amid the company's implosion Cowell nearly became bankrupt.

He then worked with BMG as an A&R consultant and set up S Records under BMG. He restarted his career in the music business by creating novelty records with acts such as the puppets Zig and Zag, Power Rangers and the roster of the World Wrestling Federation (WWF). In 1995, through his persistence, he persuaded two actors, Robson Green and Jerome Flynn from the British television drama series Soldier Soldier, to sign with him and record the song "Unchained Melody", which they had performed on the show. The recording by the duo, now named Robson & Jerome, quickly reached number 1 in the UK, staying at the top of the chart for seven weeks. It became the best-selling single of 1995 (their next release, "I Believe"/"Up on the Roof", was the third-best selling single), and their self-titled album released later in the year also became the best-selling album of 1995. They released another album and two more singles before disbanding, and sold 7 million albums and 5 million singles in total. According to Cowell, they made him his first million. Later acts he signed included Five, Westlife and Teletubbies.

=== Idol franchise ===
"On Tuesday 13 February 2001 TV veteran Alan Boyd saw two men he had never met before in his London office and the meeting changed the face of Saturday night entertainment. As Mr Cowell and Mr Fuller rattled through their idea for an ambitious new show to identify an unknown British singing star, Boyd scribbled notes during the hour-long meeting. Pop Idol, as it became, attracted mass family audiences, sold around the world, and it would also act as a template for a host of new shows set to transform Saturday night entertainment, with a mixture of live judging and public voting all in the initial pitch".

— "The scribbled note that changed TV", by Maggie Brown in The Guardian, October 2009.

In 2001, Cowell was given the role of judge on the first series of Pop Idol, a show that he and the show creator Simon Fuller successfully pitched to ITV Controller of Entertainment Claudia Rosencrantz. Maggie Brown in The Guardian states, "the show became a seminal reality/entertainment format once on air that autumn". Cowell's S Records signed the top two finishers of the first season of Pop Idol, Will Young and Gareth Gates, both of whom went on to have No 1 UK hits, and they were the top 2 best-selling singles of 2002 and the decade of 2000s. He also became a judge on the first season of American Idol in 2002. With his notoriously critical reputation, Cowell has been likened to TV personalities such as Judge Judy and The Weakest Link host Anne Robinson. His closest predecessor was British TV critic Nina Myskow who, in the 1980s, became known for her harsh put-downs in New Faces, a talent show that Cowell cited as an influence. Cowell's prominence grew, fed by his signature phrase, "I don't mean to be rude, but ...", inevitably followed by an unsparingly blunt appraisal of the contestant's talents, personality, or even physical appearance. A lot of these one-liners were the product of coaching that Cowell received from publicist Max Clifford. Cowell also appeared on the one-off World Idol programme in 2003, in which it became clear that each country's version of the Idol had attempted to come up with its own "Simon Cowell" type personality.

Cowell formed a new company, Syco, in 2005. The company is divided into three units: Syco Music, Syco TV and Syco Film. Cowell returned to music with his latest brainchild signed to Syco, the internationally successful operatic pop group Il Divo, consisting of three opera singers and one pop singer of four different nationalities. Inspired by the success of Il Divo, Cowell created a child version, Angelis, made up of six 11 to 14 year-olds from choirs across the UK, with their debut album released in November 2006.

On 11 January 2010, Cowell's exit from American Idol was made official. One year after Cowell left American Idol, the show eventually completed eight consecutive seasons of leadership amongst all primetime programmes in the United States, marking the longest annual winning streak in the ratings in U.S. television history. The 2010 season was Cowell's last on the show, and he was replaced by Steven Tyler. It was also announced that FOX had acquired the rights to The X Factor USA, an American version of British show The X Factor that launched in 2011.

=== The X Factor ===
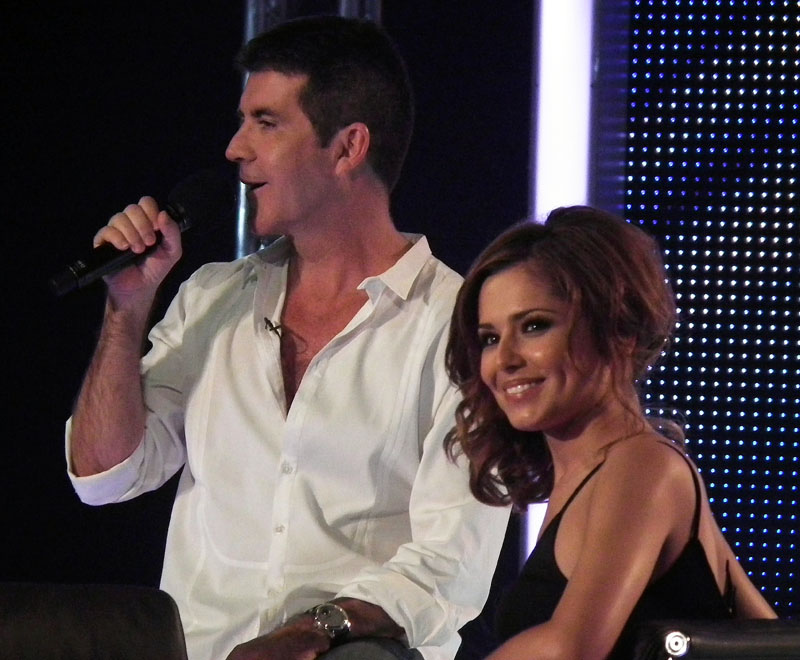
Cowell alongside Cheryl Cole as judges on The X Factor UK's seventh series on 21 June 2010

In 2004, with Sharon Osbourne and Louis Walsh, Cowell was a judge on the first series of the British television music competition The X Factor, which he created using his production company, Syco TV. The X Factor was an instant success with the viewers and enjoyed its tenth series in 2013.

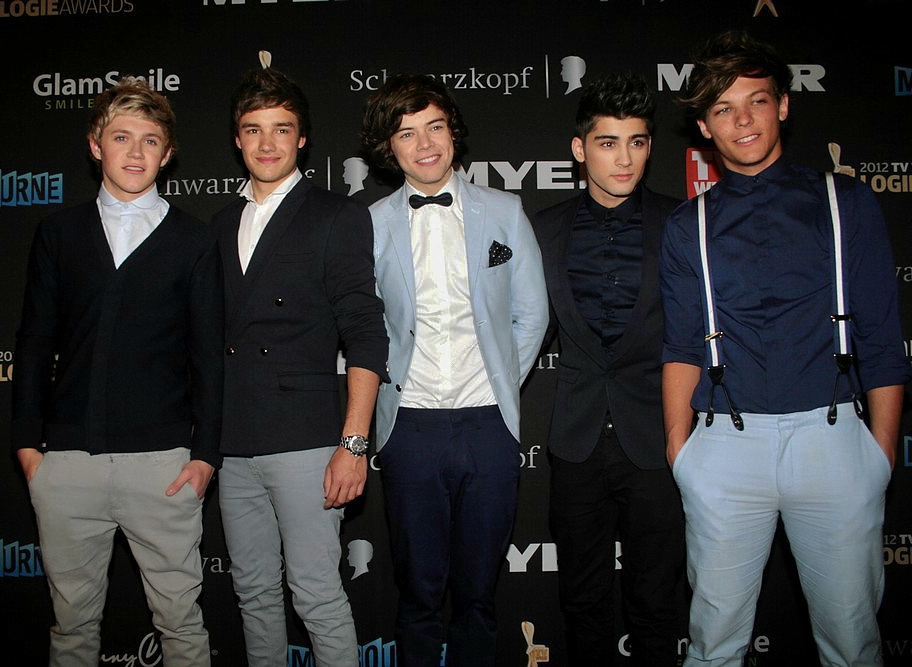
One Direction signed to Cowell's record label after being the last contestant eliminated and being mentored by Cowell on The X Factor in the UK in 2010. The group is one of Cowell's international break-out acts.

Leona Lewis, the winner of the third series of The X Factor, signed with Cowell's label Syco and achieved international success with chart-topping singles and albums. Cowell returned for a fourth series on 18 August 2007 alongside Osbourne, Walsh and new judge, Dannii Minogue. Walsh had previously been sacked from the judging panel by Cowell for the fourth series, and he was subsequently replaced by Brian Friedman, who was a judge on Grease Is the Word. Walsh was later brought back by Cowell a week into the auditions when he and Osbourne realised that they missed Walsh and that without him, there was no chemistry between the judges. Cowell returned for the fifth series in 2008, with Walsh, Minogue, and new judge Cheryl Cole, as Osbourne had decided to quit before the show began. Cowell returned for series 6 and 7 as well, although series 7 was to be his last, as he left in 2011 in order to launch The X Factor in America. After being the last contestant eliminated in the seventh series of The X Factor in the UK, the boyband One Direction signed with Cowell's label in 2011 and has gone on to top singles and album charts worldwide. Cowell was replaced by Gary Barlow. In 2011, UK series eight winners Little Mix signed to Cowell's label. The girl group has sold 50 million records worldwide.

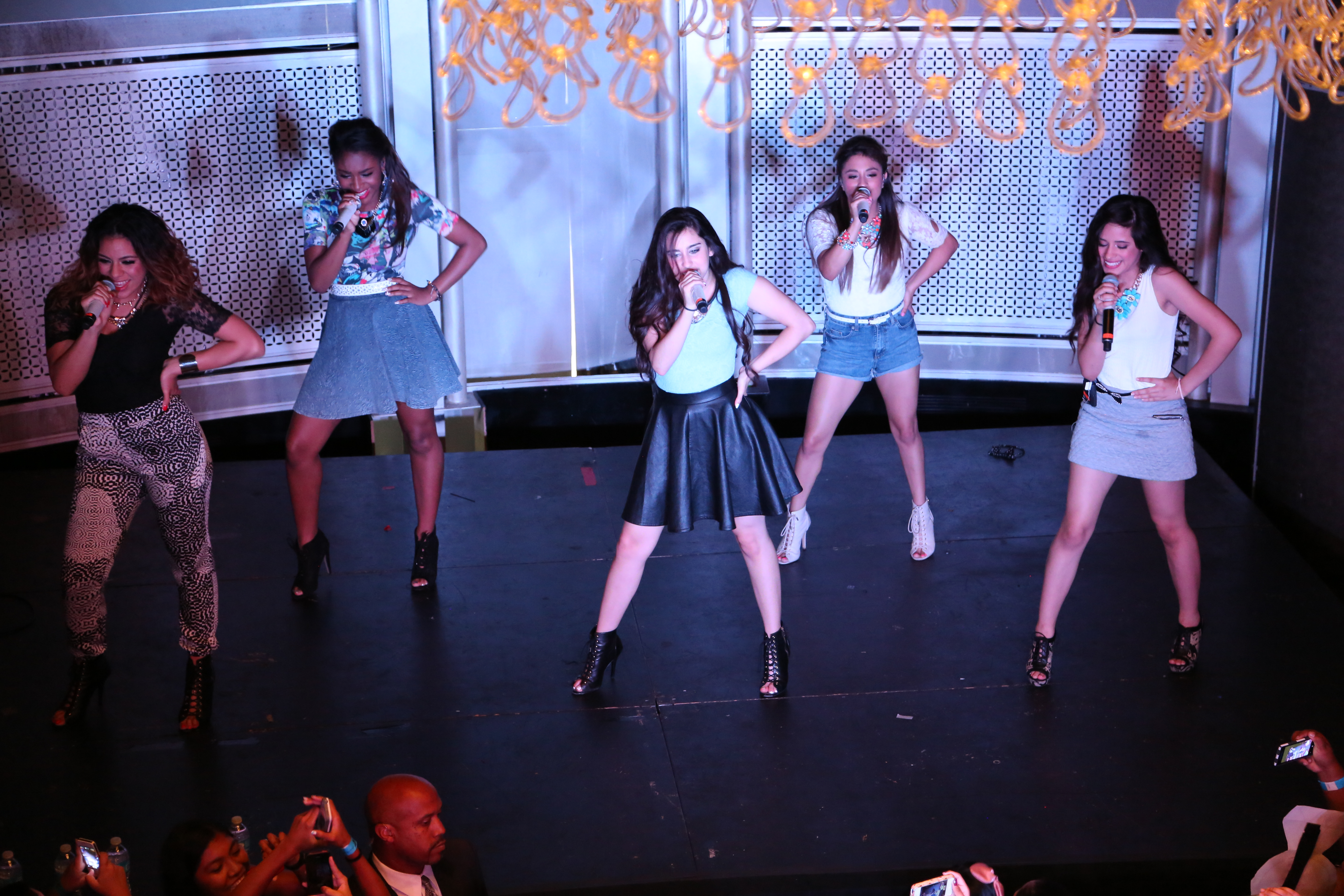
Fifth Harmony signed to Cowell's record label after being the last contestant eliminated on the American X Factor in 2012 and were mentored by him while becoming another of his successful contestants.

Australian The X Factor launched in 2005 on Network Ten, and it featured Mark Holden, Kate Ceberano and John Reid as the show's judges, but it was cancelled after just one season due to poor ratings. However, the show returned in 2010 and performed strongly on the Seven Network until its eighth season in 2016, when its ratings declined. Subsequently, the show was axed for a second time in January 2017.

Cowell also launched American The X Factor in September 2011 on American broadcaster Fox. It was originally announced that he would be a judge both on the British and American editions of the show, which aired at similar times of the year, but MTV officially reported on 17 April 2011 that this was not true. Cowell was no longer to be a judge on the British version, but he would remain a major presence backstage. He was joined by Paula Abdul, L.A. Reid, Nicole Scherzinger and formerly Cheryl Cole. Cowell's contestant Melanie Amaro came first during season 1, making Cowell the winning judge. Cowell and Reid returned for season 2, while Demi Lovato and Britney Spears joined the judging panel as replacements for Abdul and Scherzinger. This season launched another of Cowell's contestant into worldwide fame, the group Fifth Harmony.

Cowell returned for a third season of The X Factor in September 2013 alongside Demi Lovato, while Spears and L.A. Reid announced they would not be returning and were replaced by Paulina Rubio and Kelly Rowland. Cowell's last contestant Alex & Sierra won the season, marking Cowell's second season as the winning mentor after he came first with Melanie Amaro in 2011.

In October 2010, Cowell signed new three-year deals with ITV for both Britain's Got Talent and The X Factor, retaining them until 2013. On 15 November 2013, the three-year deal was extended by another three years, keeping it on air until 2016.

In October 2013, it was reported that Cowell might return to the British version of The X Factor for series 11 in place of Gary Barlow, and on 7 February 2014, his return was officially confirmed. This resulted in the cancellation of the American version after three seasons by Fox. He joined judges Louis Walsh, Cheryl Fernandez-Versini, who replaced Sharon Osbourne, and new judge, former Spice Girls member Mel B, who replaced Nicole Scherzinger. For his eighth series, he was given the Over 26s category. On 13 December, Ben Haenow and Fleur East reached the final two, which meant that Cowell was the winning mentor for the first time since series 3 2006, when he had both Leona Lewis and Ray Quinn in the final. Ben Haenow became the eleventh winner on 14 December. In 2015, Cowell returned to the X Factor for its twelfth series, along with veteran judge Cheryl Fernandez-Versini and newcomers Rita Ora and BBC Radio 1 DJ Nick Grimshaw.

In December 2020 it was announced that Cowell will be a judge on The X Factor Israel in 2021. In late May 2021, Cowell cancelled his appearance on the show following the conflict between Israel and Hamas, though he maintained that he was cancelling "for his own reasons.

In July 2024, he offered a public comment supporting the Jerusalem Youth Chorus on America’s Got Talent, a Palestinian-Israeli music group that promotes dialogue, saying, "You made something very complicated beautiful through friendship."

=== Got Talent ===
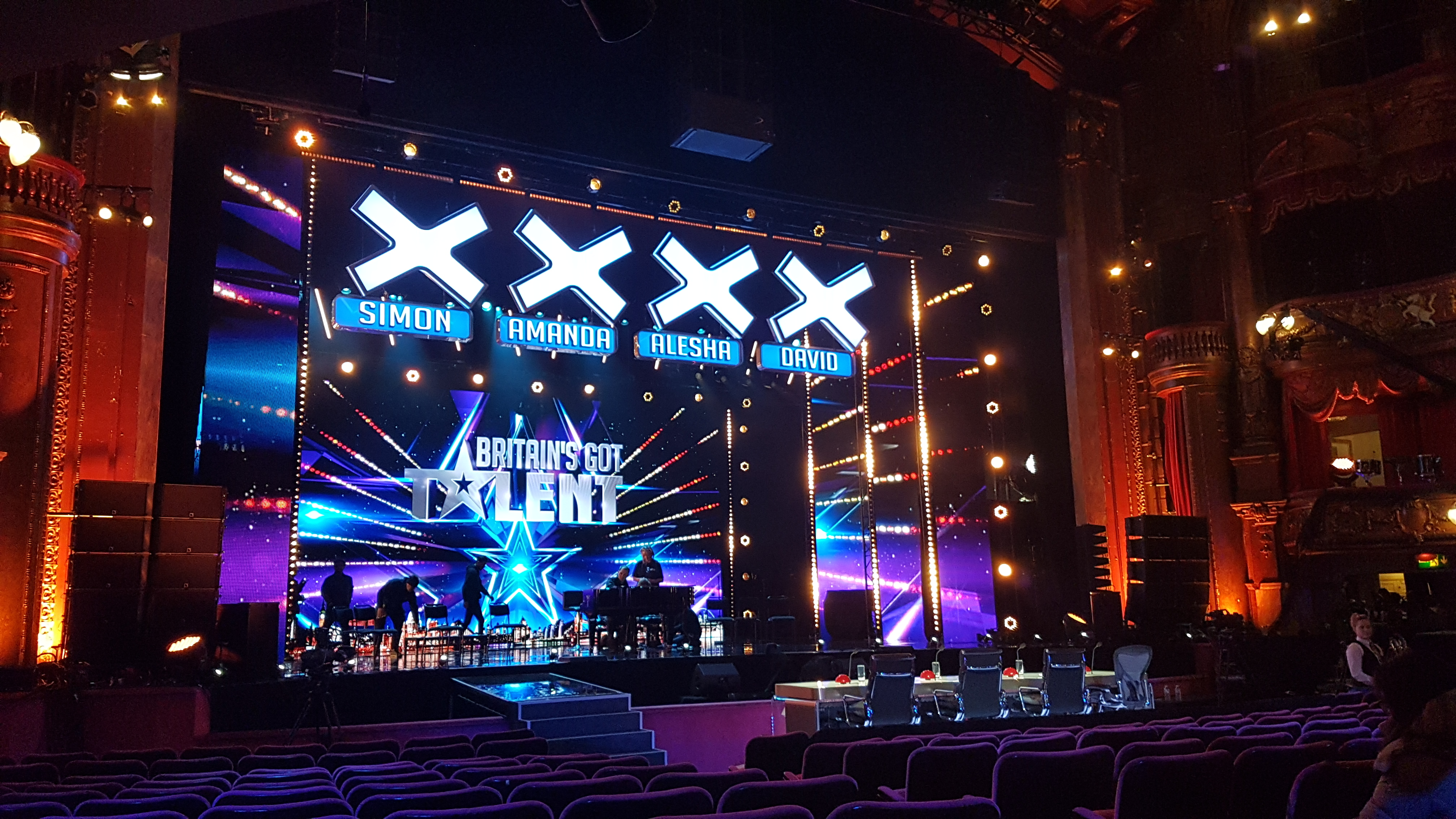
Britain's Got Talent stage at the London Palladium in the West End in 2019. Cowell's 'X' is on the far left.

Following the success of the Idol and X Factor franchises, Cowell, his company Syco, and its business partners developed a talent show format open to performers of any kind, not only singers, but also dancers, instrumentalists, magicians, comedians, novelty acts, and so on. The origins of the Got Talent format can be traced to the British talent shows Opportunity Knocks (on screen from 1956, with the winner using the now-standard method of a telephone vote) and New Faces. Immensely popular with weekly audiences of 20 million, Opportunity Knocks showcased singers, dancers and comedians in addition to non standard performers such as acrobats, animal acts and novelty acts. Cowell states, "I was a fan of variety shows Opportunity Knocks and New Faces, and to be able to update that tradition, really was a buzz".

Cowell is the executive producer of America's Got Talent, which debuted in June 2006, along with Fremantle producers of the Idol series. The show was a huge success for NBC, drawing around 12 million viewers a week and beating So You Think You Can Dance on Fox (produced by rival and Idol creator Simon Fuller).

Britain's Got Talent debuted on ITV in June 2007. Cowell appeared as a judge alongside Amanda Holden and Piers Morgan. The show was a ratings success, and second and third seasons followed in 2008 and 2009. The third series featured a publicity coup when Susan Boyle made a global media impact comparable to that of any previous talent show series winner with her regional audition performance. In December 2019, Cowell signed a five-year deal with ITV ensuring Britain's Got Talent will stay on the channel until 2024.

In 2014, Got Talent was named the world's most successful reality TV format by Guinness World Records, with spin-offs in over 68 countries. Cowell stated, "I am very proud that Got Talent is a home grown British show. We owe its success to a group of very talented producers all over the world who have made this happen. And of course amazing talent."

In 2015, Cowell launched La Banda, his first American show since his stint with American The X Factor. The show, designed to find male singers to form the "ultimate Latino Boy Band", launched on Univision in the US on 13 September 2015. The winner of the show, boy band CNCO, signed to Cowell's record label Syco Music.

Cowell was announced as the replacement for Howard Stern on America's Got Talent on 22 October 2015. On 15 July 2020, it was announced that Cowell had bought out Sony Music from their joint venture, Syco Entertainment.

=== Other talent shows ===
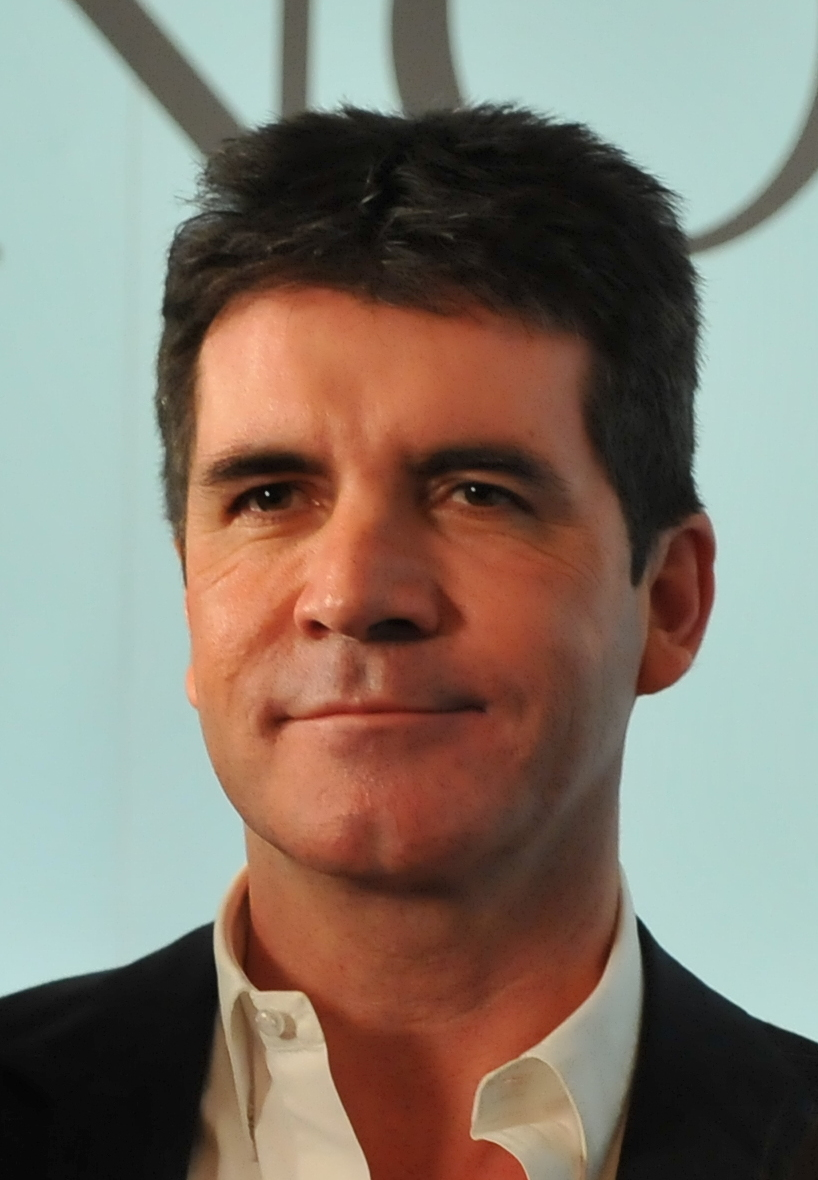
Cowell in 2010

On 16 March 2006, American Inventor debuted on ABC. Cowell co-produced the show with British entrepreneur Peter Jones, who had devised the concept. Having a similar format to the BBC's Dragons' Den, a show on which Jones was one of the investors, fledgling entrepreneurs from across the United States competed to see who could come up with the best new product concept. The 2006 winner, Janusz Liberkowski, received $1 million and the opportunity to develop his idea into a business. The show returned in 2007 for a second season.

In 2006, Cowell executive-produced Celebrity Duets, which was described as "an Idol show for Hollywood superstars". The show was hosted by Wayne Brady, and its judges were Marie Osmond, Little Richard, and David Foster.

Cowell was also the executive producer of Grease Is the Word for ITV. This show set out to find performers to play Danny and Sandy in the 2007 West End revival of Grease. It was hosted by Zoë Ball and judged by Britons David Ian and Sinitta and Americans David Gest and Brian Friedman. The musical theatre casting concept had already been introduced by the BBC with the ratings hit How Do You Solve a Problem like Maria?, but Cowell's show was not the hoped-for success. He himself said, "It has been slaughtered by the critics – and rightly so. It is far too similar to our other formats."

Cowell collaborated with UK production company Shed Media to produce 2008 ITV drama series Rock Rivals, which is based on an X Factor type show. In 2011, Cowell also created his first game show, titled Red or Black? and hosted by Ant & Dec, for ITV. Series 1 was broadcast from 3 to 10 September. The show was recommissioned by ITV for a second series in 2012, which aired weekly.

In 2013, Cowell, in partnership with YouTube, launched a video-sharing competition called The You Generation. In 2013, he was executive producer for ITV cookery series Food Glorious Food, which was hosted by Carol Vorderman. He did the same for the ITV game show Keep it in the Family, presented by Bradley Walsh in 2016.

In 2018, it was announced that Cowell created his first show to air on the BBC, titled The Greatest Dancer, which debuted on 5 January 2019. In the show, dancers competed for a £50,000 and a performance on the BBC's Strictly Come Dancing. A second series was aired in 2020.

In April 2020, Cowell judged a spin-off version of the former show Canada's Got Talent called Canadian Family's Got Talent, carried out virtually by Canadian broadcaster Citytv during the COVID-19 pandemic in Canada.

In 2025, Cowell created and featured in a new Netflix series to find the next boyband, titled Simon Cowell The Next Act. Cowell selected each band member and put together a band of 7 boys that choose the name December 10. The group were later signed to EMI Records.

== Public image ==
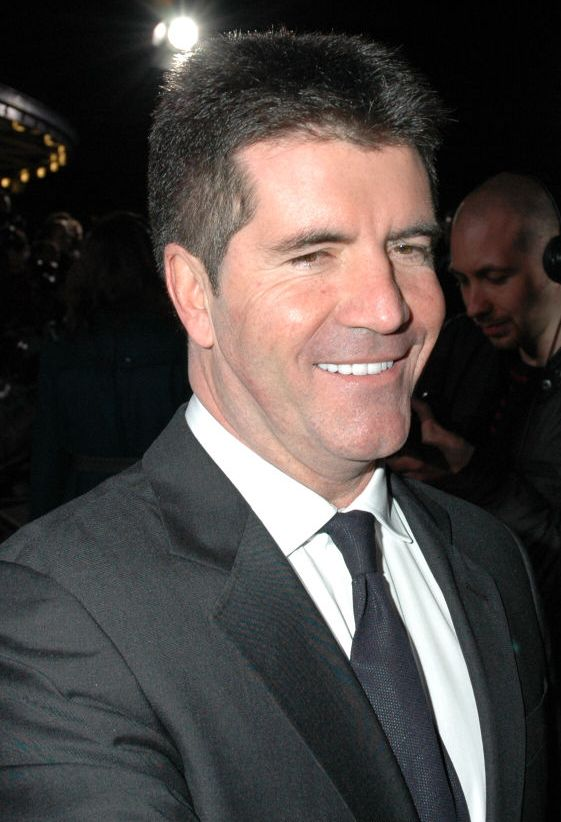
Cowell at the National Television Awards held at the Royal Albert Hall, London in November 2006

Cowell has been involved in charity work for many years. He is a patron of Together for Short Lives, the leading UK charity for all children with life-threatening and life-limiting conditions. He was patron of Children's Hospices UK between 2009 and 2011 before it merged to become Together for Short Lives. He donated money to Manchester Dogs' Home in England after it was hit by a large fire. In view of his charitable works, particularly the production of the charity single "Everybody Hurts" in aid of victims of the 2010 Haiti earthquake, as well as his services to the music industry, there was considerable media speculation as to whether Cowell would receive a knighthood in the Queen's 2010 Birthday Honours, a proposal allegedly put forward by then Prime Minister Gordon Brown.

In November 2003, Cowell appeared on the BBC's charity telethon Children in Need where viewers pledged thousands to see him get sawn in half. In December 2003, he published his autobiography titled I Don't Mean to be Rude, but.... In it, he told of his childhood, his years working in music and experiences on Pop Idol, Pop Stars Rivals, and American Idol, and finally, his tips for being successful as a pop star. In 2010, he was added as a new entry to the latest edition of the UK's Who's Who.

Cowell has appeared as a guest voice in an episode of The Simpsons ("Smart & Smarter"), in which he gets beaten up by Homer Simpson (while criticising Homer's punches). In May 2010, he portrayed himself again in an episode of The Simpsons, "Judge Me Tender". His voice was heard on an episode of Family Guy ("Lois Kills Stewie"), in which he told Stewie that his singing was so awful that he should be dead. He made an MTV Movie Award-winning cameo appearance as himself in Scary Movie 3, where he sits in judgment during a battle rap (and is subsequently killed by gunfire for criticising the rappers). He appears in the DVD version of Shrek 2 as himself in Far Far Away Idol and also provided the voice.

Cowell was once the fastest "Star in a Reasonably Priced Car" on BBC's motoring show Top Gear, driving a Suzuki Liana around the show's test track in a time of 1:47.1. When Top Gear retired the Liana along with its rankings after the eighth series, Cowell was the eighth fastest overall and the third fastest non-professional driver. On 11 November 2007 Cowell yet again appeared on Top Gear, achieving a time of 1:45.9 thus putting him ahead of chef Gordon Ramsay and back at the top of the table. His time of 1:45.9 was then tied with English rock singer Brian Johnson of AC/DC and Grand Designs host Kevin McCloud for the second fastest time, just 0.1 seconds behind Jamiroquai singer Jay Kay. In March 2015, Cowell defended Top Gear presenter Jeremy Clarkson after he was suspended by the BBC for punching a colleague, with Cowell stating on Good Morning Britain: "He's apologised. But I think what is quite obvious is that the public are behind him, but you know, that's Jeremy."

He appeared on an episode of Who Wants to Be a Millionaire? (the original British version) and Saturday Night Live in 2004. Cowell has also guest-starred (filling in for Regis Philbin) in the popular talk show Live with Regis and Kelly during American Idol's finalist week in early 2006. Cowell introduced entertainer Dick Clark at the 2006 Primetime Emmy Awards. He was seen on the British charity telethon Comic Relief, appearing on Comic Relief Does The Apprentice where he donated £25,000 for a fun fair ticket. Cowell has also appeared on the MTV shows Cribs and Punk'd. On Punk'd, Ryan Seacrest and Randy Jackson set him up to believe his $400,000 Rolls-Royce was stolen and had caused an accident by using a nearly identical car.

Cowell was a partner in the Royal Ascot Racing Club, a thoroughbred horse racing syndicate which owned the 2005 Epsom Derby winner, Motivator. Cowell was chosen as the first subject of the re-launched British edition of This Is Your Life, in an episode broadcast on ITV on 2 June 2007. He was presented with the Red Book by Sir Trevor McDonald while presenting American Idol.

On 1 July 2007, Cowell appeared as a speaker at the Concert for Diana (alongside Randy Jackson and Ryan Seacrest) held at Wembley Stadium, London, to celebrate the life of Princess Diana almost 10 years after her death. Proceeds from the concert went to Diana's charities as well as to charities of which her sons Princes William and Harry are patrons.

At the 2012 Pride of Britain Awards on 30 October, Cowell, along with Michael Caine, Elton John, Richard Branson and Stephen Fry, recited Rudyard Kipling's poem "If—" in tribute to the 2012 British Olympic and Paralympics athletes. In October 2013 Cowell took part in a fundraising event in Los Angeles in support of the Israel Defense Forces. The event raised $20 million and Cowell made a personal donation of $150,000.

To raise money for the families of the victims of the Grenfell Tower fire in London in June 2017 and for The London Community Foundation, Cowell arranged the recording and release of a charity single, "Bridge over Troubled Water". Cowell collaborated with a number of vocalists for the single, including Robbie Williams, Dua Lipa, Roger Daltrey and Rita Ora, and the song reached number one in the UK Singles Chart.

== Personal life ==
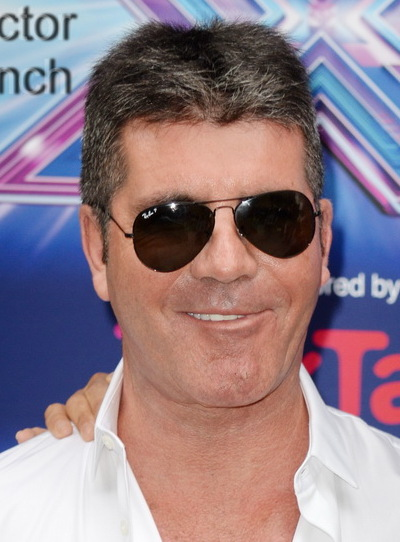
Cowell in 2014

Cowell dated English presenter Terri Seymour from 2002 to 2008. Cowell was engaged to make-up artist Mezhgan Hussainy from 2010 to 2011. In 2013, Cowell began dating Lauren Silverman. In July 2013, Silverman's husband and Cowell's friend, Andrew Silverman, filed for an at-fault divorce, citing adultery by his wife and naming Cowell as a co-respondent. News of the divorce filing became public two weeks later, when it was widely reported that Silverman and Cowell were expecting a baby together.

Cowell said, "There are a lot of things I will eventually clear up when the time is right, but I really have to be sensitive because there's a lot of people's feelings involved here." The Silvermans released separate statements expressing concern for the well-being of their son during the divorce process. In August 2013, the Silvermans settled their divorce out of court, enabling Cowell to avoid being called as a witness in the divorce proceedings. He subsequently confirmed that Silverman was pregnant with his child, and she gave birth to their son Eric on 14 February 2014. The couple confirmed their engagement in January 2022.

In 2010, Cowell came out in support for then Conservative Party leader David Cameron for Prime Minister of the United Kingdom, writing in The Sun: "I believe he is the Prime Minister Britain needs at this time. He has substance and the stomach to navigate us through difficult times." In 2013, Cowell contradicted his previous statement about David Cameron. According to the interview, while he has supported candidates, he has never voted in an election. Cowell was in favour of the UK remaining in the EU in the 2016 EU referendum.

In 2019, Cowell became a vegan after doctors advised him to change his diet for health reasons. He was also named one of the wealthiest people in the UK by the Sunday Times Rich List, Cowell was worth £385 million in 2019.

In 2020, Cowell announced he would be writing a seven-book series titled Wishfits with his son. The series was scheduled to launch in 2023. On 8 August 2020, Cowell broke his back after he fell off his new electric motorcycle, which many press sources confused with an electric bike. The incident occurred while he was testing it at his home in Malibu, California. Cowell was taken to the hospital, where he underwent back surgery overnight. After the accident, he began eating animal-based food again in order to "rebuild his strength". As a result of the accident, Cowell was unable to judge the live shows in the fifteenth season of America's Got Talent; Kelly Clarkson and Kenan Thompson filled in as guest judges for the first two live shows, and his slot would be unfilled for the remainder of the season.

Cowell has depression. He has taken regular therapy sessions to combat the symptoms of the illness. Cowell revealed he gets migraines after long days working under studio lights, so he wears red tinted glasses to counteract the effect during filming.

== Awards and recognition ==
In 2004 and 2010, Time magazine named Cowell one of the 100 most influential people in the world. In 2006, the British public ranked him number 28 in ITV's poll of TV's 50 Greatest Stars. In 2008, he received the Special Recognition Award (presented to him by Andrew Lloyd Webber) at the National Television Awards held at the Royal Albert Hall. New Statesman listed Cowell at number 41 in a list of "50 People who Matter [in] 2010". TV Guide named him at number 10 in their 2013 list of The 60 Nastiest Villains of All Time.

In 2012, Cowell was featured in the BBC Radio 4 series The New Elizabethans to mark the diamond Jubilee of Queen Elizabeth II. A panel of seven academics, journalists and historians named Cowell among the group of people in the UK "whose actions during the reign of Elizabeth II have had a significant impact on lives in these islands and given the age its character". Cowell was announced to receive a star on the Hollywood Walk of Fame on 22 August 2018, in the Television category.

== Filmography ==
=== Television ===
| Year | Title | Role | Notes |
|---|---|---|---|
| 1987 | Right to Reply | Guest | 1 episode |
| 1990 | Sale of the Century | Contestant | 1 episode |
| 2001–2003 | Pop Idol | Judge | Also Producer |
| 2002–2010 | American Idol | Judge | Also Producer |
| 2003–2004 | World Idol | Judge | Also Producer |
| 2003 | American Juniors | Guest | Guest; 1 episode |
| 2003 | Hollywood Squares | Contestant | Centre Square; 15 episodes |
| 2003 | Who Wants to Be a Millionaire? | Celebrity Contestant | 1 episode |
| 2003, 2007 | Top Gear | Special Guest | 3 episodes |
| 2003–2024 | Ant & Dec's Saturday Night Takeaway | Guest | 17 episodes |
| 2004 | Saturday Night Live | Guest | 1 episode |
| 2004 | The Sharon Osbourne Show | Guest | 1 episode |
| 2004, 2010 | The Simpsons | Himself / Henry (voice) | 2 episodes: "Smart & Smarter" and "Judge Me Tender" |
| 2004–2010, 2014–2018 | The X Factor UK | Judge | Also creator and executive producer |
| 2006 | The Fairly OddParents | Himself (voice) | 1 episode: "Fairy Idol" |
| 2007 | The Kylie Show | Guest | TV special |
| 2007 | This Is Your Life | Guest | 1 episode |
| 2007, 2016 | Family Guy | Himself (voice) | 3 episodes: "Stewie Kills Lois", "Lois Kills Stewie", and "Run, Chris, Run" |
| 2007–present | Britain's Got Talent | Judge | Also creator and executive producer |
| 2008 | The Apprentice USA | Special Guest | 1 episode |
| 2009 | Cheryl Cole's Night In | Guest | TV special |
| 2010–2011 | Piers Morgan's Life Stories | Guest | 2 episodes |
| 2011 | Susan Boyle: An Unlikely Superstar | Himself | TV documentary |
| 2011–2013 | The X Factor USA | Judge | Also creator and executive producer |
| 2012 | The Talent Show Story | Himself | 5 episodes |
| 2012–2013, 2015–2016 | The X Factor Australia | Guest Judge | 4 episodes |
| 2016–present | America's Got Talent | Judge | Also creator and executive producer |
| 2019 | The X Factor: Celebrity | Judge | 1 series |
| 2019 | Britain's Got Talent: The Champions | Judge | 1 series |
| 2019 | America's Got Talent: The Champions | Judge | 2 seasons |
| 2020 | The X Factor: The Band | Judge | 1 series |
| 2020 | Canadian Family's Got Talent | Guest Judge | 2 episodes |
| 2022 | Canada's Got Talent | Guest Judge | 1 episode |
| 2022 | America's Got Talent: Extreme | Judge | 1 season |
| 2023 | America's Got Talent: All-Stars | Judge | 1 season |
| 2024 | America's Got Talent: Fantasy League | Judge | 1 season |
| 2025 | Simon Cowell: The Next Act | Presenter | Netflix show; also creator and executive producer |

=== Film ===
As himself
| Year | Title | Notes |
|---|---|---|
| 2003 | Scary Movie 3 | Cameo |
| 2004 | Far Far Away Idol | Voice role on Shrek 2 bonus segment |
| 2013 | One Direction: This Is Us | Uncredited, also producer |
| 2016 | Popstar: Never Stop Never Stopping | Cameo |
| 2017 | Little Mix: Glory Days – The Documentary | Documentary film |
| 2020 | Scoob! | Voice role |

== Bibliography ==
- I Don't Mean to Be Rude, But... (2003) (autobiography)
