= Franklin Harbor Conservation Park =

Protected area in South Australia

- IUCN category Ia (strict nature reserve)
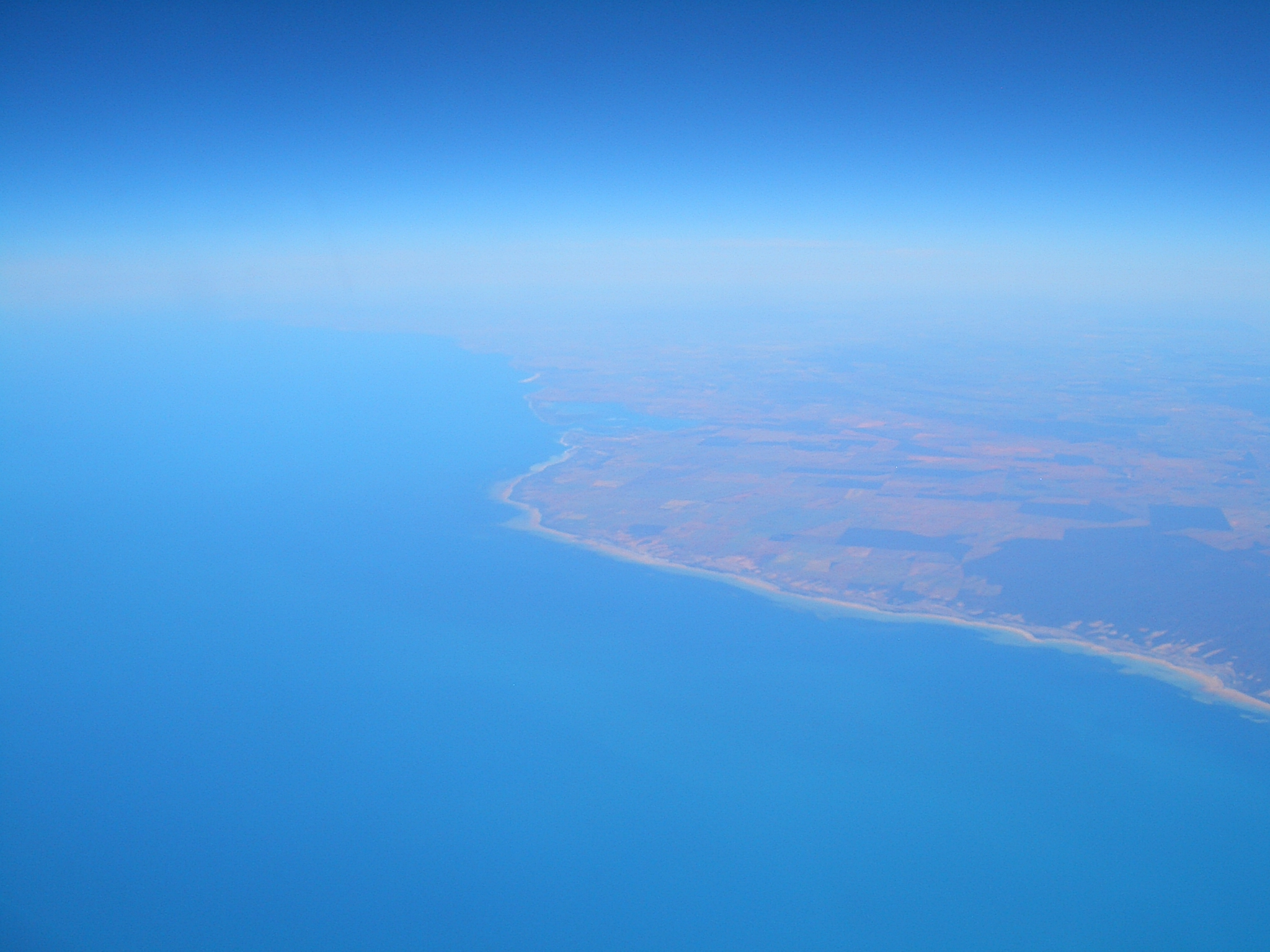
- Aerial view of the east coast of Eyre Peninsula near Cowell - the peninsula on the right side is within the conservation park.

- Location within South Australia
- Location: South Australia
- Nearest city: Cowell.
- Coordinates: 33°44′39″S 136°56′17″E
- Area: 13.56 km^{2} (5.24 sq mi)
- Established: 22 January 1976
- Governing body: Department for Environment and Water

Franklin Harbor Conservation Park is a protected area in the Australian state of South Australia located on the east coast of Eyre Peninsula in the gazetted locality of Cowell about 5 kilometres (3.1 miles) south of the town centre in Cowell.

The conservation park consists of land on a peninsula that encloses the south east side of Franklin Harbor and on four islands within Franklin Harbor including Entrance Island. The conservation park occupies land in Sections 258, 259, 260 and 261 of the cadastral unit of the Hundred of Playford.

The conservation park was proclaimed on 22 January 1976 under the National Parks and Wildlife Act 1972. As of July 2016, the conservation park covered an area of 13.56 square kilometres (5.24 sq mi). Since 2012, the conservation park has been overlapped by the protected area known as the Franklin Harbor Marine Park.

As of 1982, the conservation park was considered to have "significance" for the following reasons:

...(it) preserves an area of mangrove and samphire flats, an association that is markedly depleted in South Australia. The entrance islands ... contain a population of death adders. The islands also provide a safe roosting and feeding site for sea birds.

As of 1982, the flora of the conservation park was described as follows:

Two of the islands and the protected side of the peninsula feature a low woodland of Avicennia marina and a samphire shrubland. The seaward side of the peninsula features a sandy beach backed by minor areas of open scrubland dominated by boxthorn, with scattered Callitris, Santalum, Leucopogon and Nitraria.

The conservation park is classified as an IUCN Category Ia protected area. In 1982, it was listed on the now-defunct Register of the National Estate.

== See also ==
- Protected areas of South Australia
