= Wilcherry Hill =

The Wilcherry Hill Project was originally a proposed iron ore mine and associated infrastructure on Eyre Peninsula, South Australia. It was proposed by Ironclad Mining Ltd which later merged with Trafford Resources to become Tyranna Resources. As of 2018, the Wilcherry Project is a joint venture between Alliance Resources (67.35%) and Tyranna Resources (32.65%). The venture is exploring for economic concentrations of any of gold, tin, copper, zinc, lead, silver, iron, bismuth, tungsten and uranium.

== Location ==
The mine site is located approximately 40 km north of Kimba, on central Eyre Peninsula, South Australia. The mine site access road will extend south from the mine site to the township of Kimba.

== Mining and processing ==
The project will consist of two mining stages:

- Stage 1A – open cut mining of high grade magnetite ore from four primary ore bodies and several associated satellite ore deposits. Processing of this ore will be through dry crushing and screening and dry magnetic separation.
- Stage 1B – mining and processing of mined and stockpiled lower grade ore using dry processing and an additional wet magnetic separation process.

== Product transport and export ==
With a proposed full production rate of 2 million tonnes per annum and an identified resource of approximately 10 million tonnes, the projected operational life is anticipated to be five years.

Initially the ore was planned to be shipped from Port Adelaide via road, then rail freight. This plan has been abandoned in favour of exporting through Lucky Bay. The existing passenger ferry harbour there will require significant expansion to facilitate the transshipment of iron ore into Panamax or small Capesize vessels.

In August 2014, Ironclad announced that the company was considering selling direct-shipping ore from Wilcherry Hill to Whyalla-based iron ore exporter, Arrium.

== Environmental approvals ==
Ironclad mining received federal environmental approval (with conditions) on 23 September 2011.

Conditions were set in response to the presence of two threatened species within the project area: the slender-billed thornbill and the malleefowl.
