= District Council of Franklin Harbour =

Coordinates: 33°41′00″S 136°56′00″E

- Local government area
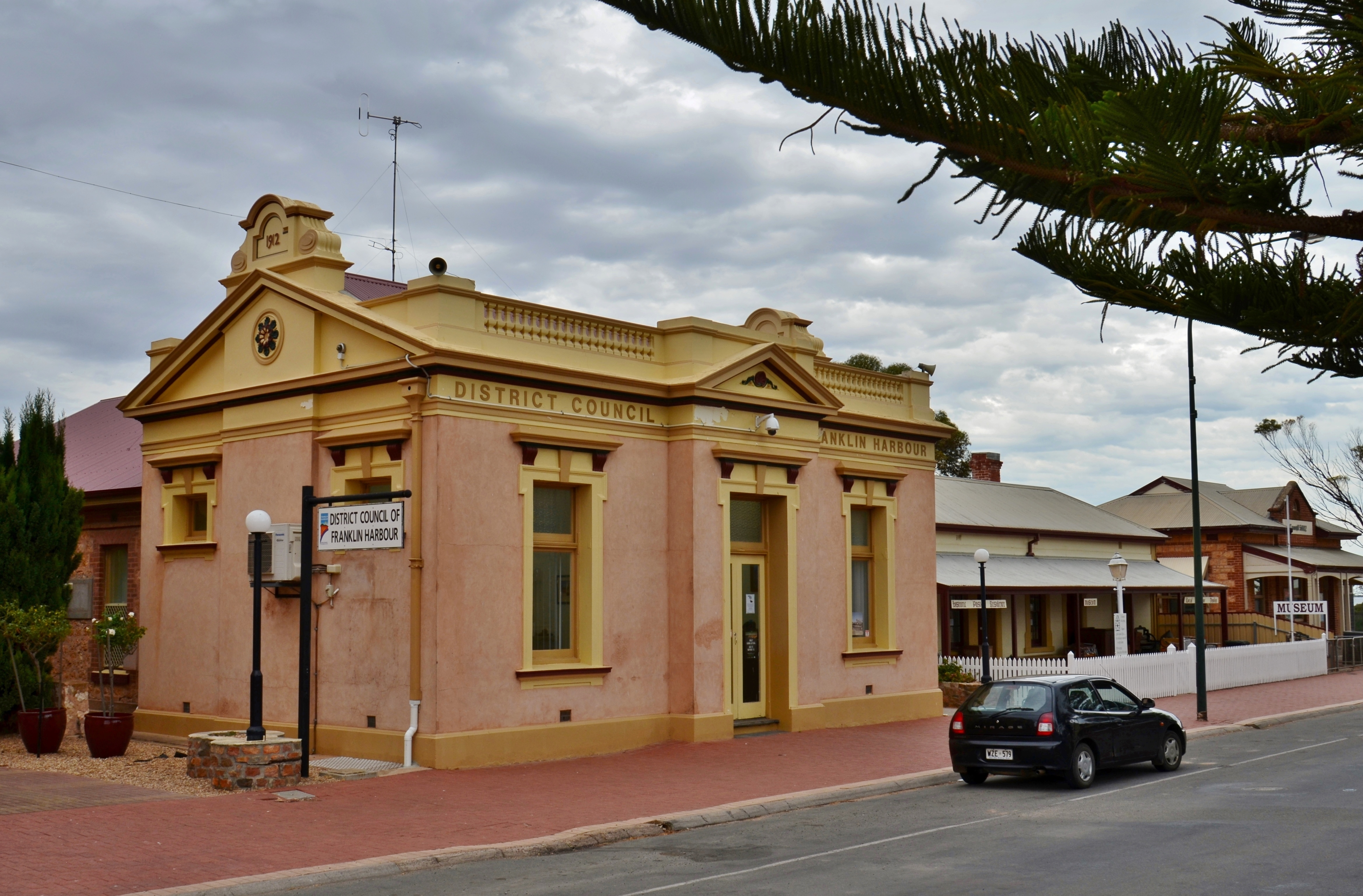
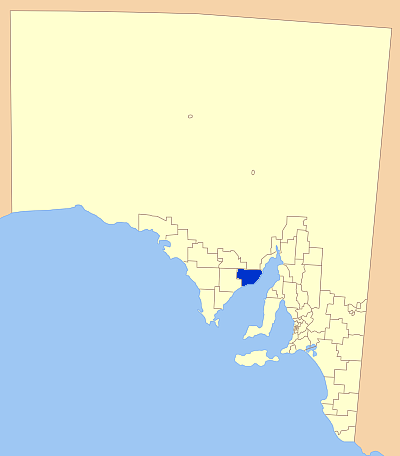
- The District Council office in Cowell Location of the District Council of Franklin Harbour

- Interactive map of District Council of Franklin Harbour
- Country: Australia
- State: South Australia
- Region: Eyre and Western
- Established: 1888
- Council seat: Cowell

Government
  - Mayor: Robert Walsh
  - State electorate: Flinders
  - Federal division: Grey

Area
  - Total: 3,283 km^{2} (1,268 sq mi)

Population
  - Total: 1,293 (LGA 2021)
- Website: District Council of Franklin Harbour
LGAs around District Council of Franklin Harbour
District Council of Kimba	Outback Communities Authority	City of Whyalla
District Council of Cleve	District Council of Franklin Harbour	Spencer Gulf
District Council of Cleve	Spencer Gulf	Spencer Gulf

The District Council of Franklin Harbour is a local government area in South Australia on the Eyre Peninsula. Cowell is the major population centre of an agricultural district based on farming wheat and sheep, supplemented by a fishing and oyster farming industries. The district's coastal towns including Cowell and Lucky Bay attract large numbers of tourists during school holidays, with the new Spencer Gulf ferry service increasing traffic to these areas since 2006.

== History ==
Franklin Harbour itself was first sighted by Matthew Flinders in 1802 and subsequently named after his midshipman and nephew, John Franklin, by Governor George Gawler in 1840. The first settlers to the region arrived in 1853, with more following soon afterward.

The District Council was proclaimed in 1888. In 2014, the Hundreds of Mangalo and Heggaton were transferred from the Franklin Harbour council to the District Council of Cleve.

== Localities ==
The district's focal point is the town of Cowell; it also includes the localities of Lucky Bay, Midgee, Miltalie, Minbrie, Mitchellville and Port Gibbon.

== Facilities ==
The town of Cowell has most of the normal facilities of a larger town including accommodation, supermarket, petrol station, hotel and a number of food supplying shops.

Educationally, the district is served by Cowell Area School, which includes a school-community library; with a district hospital and clinic to cover the district's health needs. A number of churches also serve the district.

There are a number of sporting clubs including cricket, football, netball, golf and bowls along with playing facilities for each sport. Cowell also has an all weather boat ramp for those with boats, as well as a jetty.

== Elected members ==
Ward	Councillor	Notes
Unsubdivided	Geoff Giles	
Unsubdivided	Eddie Elleway	
Unsubdivided	Robert Starr	Mayor
Unsubdivided	Daven Wagner	
Unsubdivided	Robert Walsh	
Unsubdivided	Michael Williams	Deputy Mayor

== Chairmen and mayors of Franklin Harbour ==
- Frank Laurie Williams (1925-1927)
- Earnest Perry Smith (1932-1939)
- John Taylor Forth (1939-1941)
- Frank Laurie Williams (1941-1945)
- John Pellew Story (1945-1947)
- Sidney Gordon Clothier (1947-1960)
- Harold Alwin Schiller (1960-1967)
- William James Martin Cooper (1967-1973)
- John Arthur Burton (1973-1980)
- Dudley John Kaden (1981-?)
