= Tyranna Resources =

Australian mining company

- Type: Public
- Traded as: ASX: TYX
- Industry: mineral exploration
- Predecessors: IronClad Mining, Trafford Resources
- Founded: May 2015; 11 years ago
- Headquarters: Perth, Australia
- Website: www.tyrannaresources.com

Tyranna Resources is an Australian listed mineral exploration company. It was formed in 2015 by the merger of Ironclad Mining Limited and its major shareholder, Trafford Resources Limited.

IronClad Mining's major focus was iron ore exploration at the Wilcherry Hill Iron Project in South Australia. The company was listed on the Australian Stock Exchange on 11 July 2007. Trafford Resources Limited was the company's most substantial shareholder. IronClad Mining's head office was in Adelaide. Tyranna Resources' registered office is in Perth.

At the end of 2014, IronClad Mining announced a merger with its largest shareholder Trafford Resources through a scheme of arrangement in which IronClad bought all of the shares in Trafford. The merger took effect in May 2015 and the combined entity was renamed Tyranna Resources.

Following the merger, the focus of the combined company moved from Wilcherry Hill to exploration prospects near the Challenger mine.

== Wilcherry Hill ==
The Wilcherry Hill mine has received State and Federal mine development approvals, but is yet to secure its export pathway. The company initially considered exporting its iron ore via Port Adelaide by road freighting it firstly to a standard gauge rail siding at Whyalla. The company later abandoned the idea in favor of a plan to expand the existing passenger ferry harbor at Lucky Bay to facilitate iron ore exports.
