= Cowell, South Australia =

Cowell
- Town
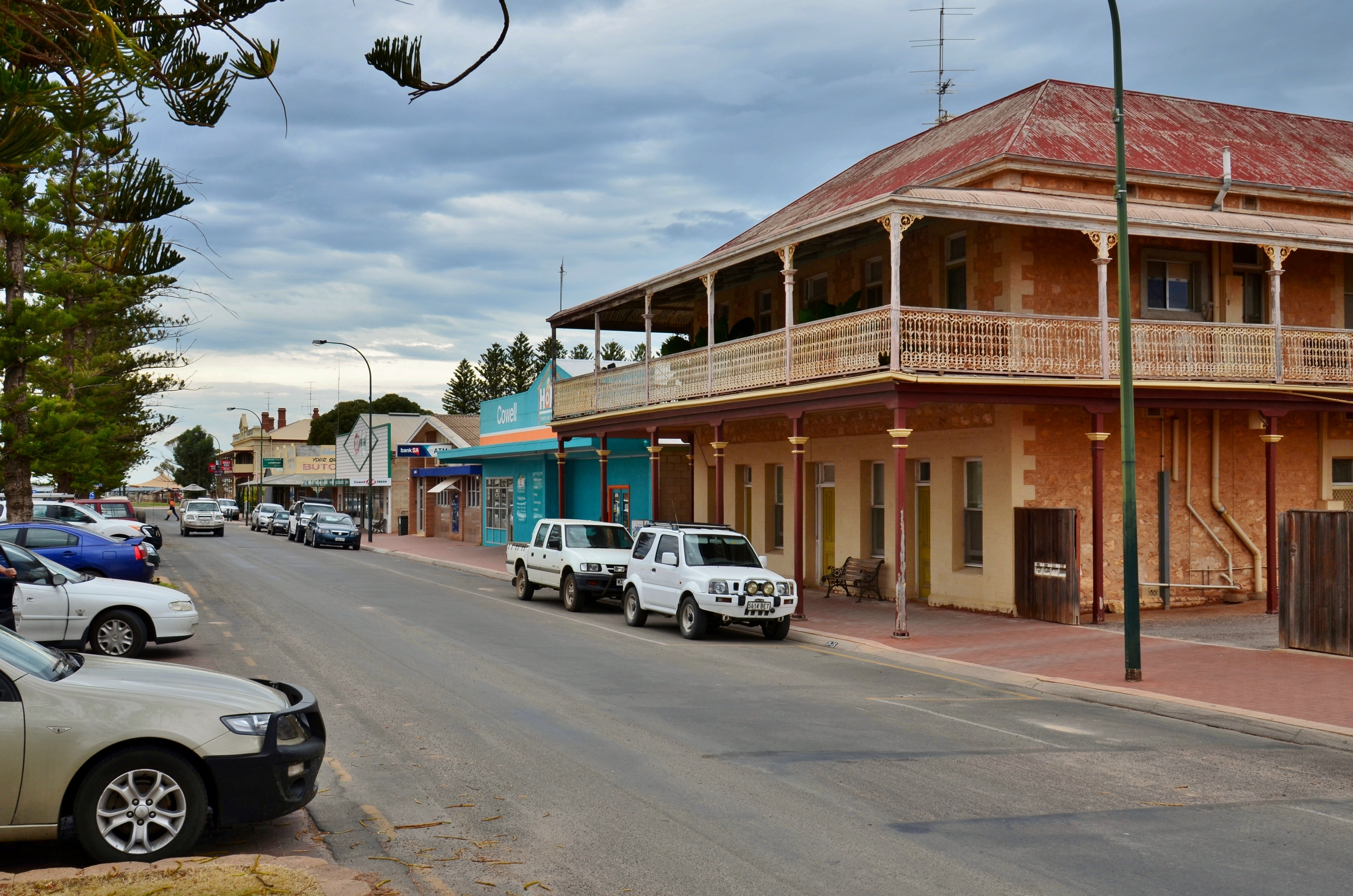
- Main Street, Cowell

- Coordinates: 33°41′0″S 136°55′0″E
- Country: Australia
- State: South Australia
- Region: Eyre Western
- LGA: District Council of Franklin Harbour
- Location: 209 km (130 mi) North-west of Adelaide; 153 km (95 mi) north-east of Port Lincoln; 92 km (57 mi) south-west of Whyalla
- Established: 28 October 1880 (town); 23 December 1998 (locality)

Government
  - State electorate: Giles
  - Federal division: Grey
- Elevation: 3 m (9.8 ft)

Population
  - Total: 1,004 (UCL 2021)
- Postcode: 5602
- County: Jervois
- Mean max temp: 22.6 °C (72.7 °F)
- Mean min temp: 11.5 °C (52.7 °F)
- Annual rainfall: 359.6 mm (14.16 in)
Localities around Cowell
Mangalo	Miltalie; Minbrie	Mitchellville
Cleve; Arno Bay	Cowell	Mitchellville; Lucky Bay
Arno Bay; Spencer Gulf	Spencer Gulf; Port Gibbon; Spencer Gulf	Spencer Gulf
- Distances; Coordinates; Climate; Adjoining localities

Cowell is a coastal town on Franklin Harbor on the eastern side of the Eyre Peninsula, in South Australia on the Lincoln Highway 111 km south of the major town of Whyalla. It is 493 km by road from Adelaide.

Franklin Harbor is a natural harbour 49 km^{2} in area with a channel to the sea just 100 metres wide.

The town of Cowell is the major population centre of the District Council of Franklin Harbour, and the centre of an agricultural district, farming wheat and sheep. The district covers an area of 3,283 square kilometres. Fishing, and more recently, oyster farming has also been an important industry.

== History ==
When settlers commenced farming the area in 1853, Franklin Harbour became a logical place to load ships for export of wheat and wool and a small settlement was soon established.

The town was surveyed during July 1880 and was proclaimed on 28 October 1880. It was named after John Clayton Cowell who was a British soldier who served as the Governor of Windsor Castle. The locality's boundaries were gazetted on 23 December 1998 and include the Government Town of Cowell and the site of the ceased Government Town of Ferns, and the unbounded localities of Yabmana and Elbow Hill.

In 1965, a deposit of jade was discovered in the nearby Minbrie Ranges. To date over 100 outcrops have been found within an area of 9 square kilometres and as such has been designated by the South Australian Department of Minerals and Energy Resources as the "Cowell Jade Province".

The Franklin Harbour Historical Museum, situated in the old post office residence in Main Street, Cowell preserves many historically important artefacts of the region, both natural and manmade.

The historic Franklin Harbour Hotel in Main Street is listed on the South Australian Heritage Register.

== Geography ==
The township of Cowell lies on Franklin Harbour, a naturally a land-locked bay with a narrow entrance through which the tide rushes in and out. This results in calm waters inside the harbour, with much of the bay being dominated by shallow tidal mud flats and associated mangrove ecosystems. Due to the velocity of the tide through the harbour's entrance, the waters of the bay are constantly filled with clay and silt particles that are kept in suspension by the moving water. There are very few sandy beaches lining the harbour due to this fact. The Franklin Harbor Conservation Park is established on the southern arm of the harbour and Entrance Island.

The waters of Franklin Harbour lie within the outer boundary of the Franklin Harbor Marine Park. Fishing is permitted within the park, but is prohibited within several internal sanctuary zones. The park extends into Spencer Gulf and northward past Lucky Bay to Port Gibbon.

Inland, the landscape is dominated by agricultural land, as well as areas of untouched vegetation on the coastal margins. The Minbrie Ranges can be found further inland.

== Economy ==
Agriculture and commercial fishing have long been the dominant sectors of the local economy, with commodities such as wheat and wool being the driving force for the establishment of the town.

In earlier years such produce was exported from Cowell by means of sailing ketches. The first jetty at Cowell was built in 1881, and although several extensions were added later, it was still of an inadequate length. A new main jetty was opened in 1913 but the old jetty remained until demolished in 1975. The old jetty was then replaced by a structure on concrete piles with wood deck, some 146 metres long, known as the fishermen's jetty.

The major crops of the area are cereals such as wheat, barley and oats, with legumes also grown. Sheep are still farmed in the district, with cattle and goats introduced more recently.

Aquaculture has become a vital part of the economy in Franklin Harbour in recent years. The excellent tidal flow makes it suitable for the farming of Pacific oysters.

Tourism is an important economic drive for the town, with tourists flocking to the area at Easter and over the summer holidays. Fishing for many species including King George and silver whiting, garfish, mullet, flathead, snapper, Tommy Ruff, snook, yellowfin whiting, squid and crabs is very popular, with other forms of water sport available further up the coastline.

There are other attractions such as Cowell Jade, which showcases the region's Jade, as well as numerous scenic drives, some of which are suitable for 4x4 only.

Historical locations include the site of children's author May Gibbs' first Australian residence. A memorial stands 10 km from Cowell, along the Cowell to Cleve Road.

== Community ==
There are two hotels present in the town, both on the main street. There is a variety of sporting clubs, including football, cricket and netball clubs; all of which compete in local leagues.

The town also has a hospital, an area school, Cowell Area School, and a police station to service the district.

== Government ==
Cowell is located in the District Council of Franklin Harbour local government area, the state electoral district of Giles and the federal Division of Grey.

== Transport ==
Cowell is located on the Lincoln Highway (B100), five to six hours drive from Adelaide. Stateliner coach services run daily between Port Lincoln and Adelaide, stopping in Cowell.

The Sea SA ferry service departs from nearby Lucky Bay across the Spencer Gulf to Wallaroo. The 60 km (37 mi) journey takes approximately 2 hours dependent on conditions. Services were suspended in August 2014, with the company announcing plans to recommence in late 2016 using a new ferry that is currently under construction.

Cowell Airport is located near the town, offering access by small aircraft but is not served by any airlines.

== Notable people ==
- Hugh McDonald - Musician, former band member of Redgum (d. 2016)
- John Menadue - Australian businessman and public commentator, and formerly a senior public servant and diplomat.

== Gallery ==
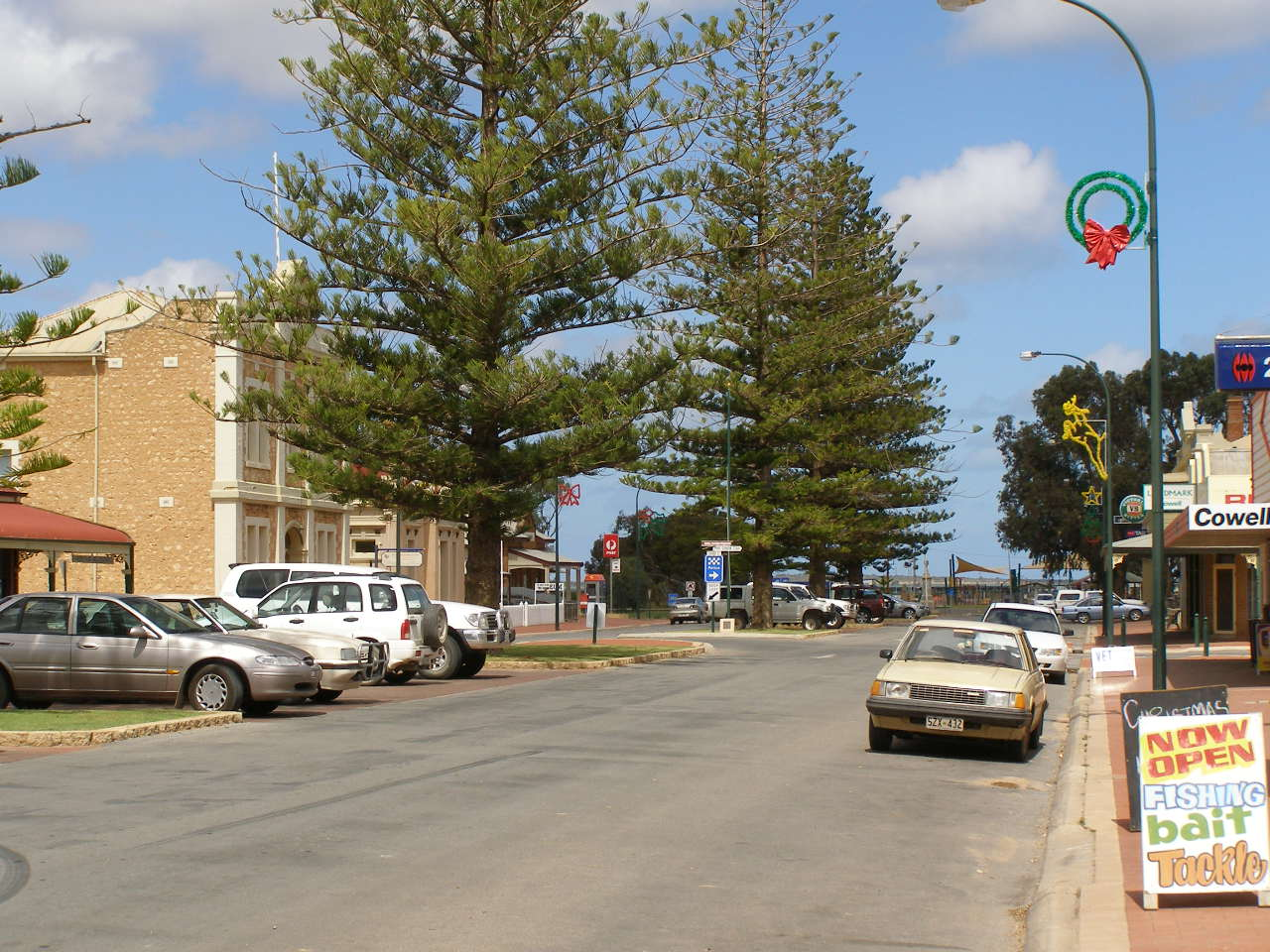
Main Street, Cowell

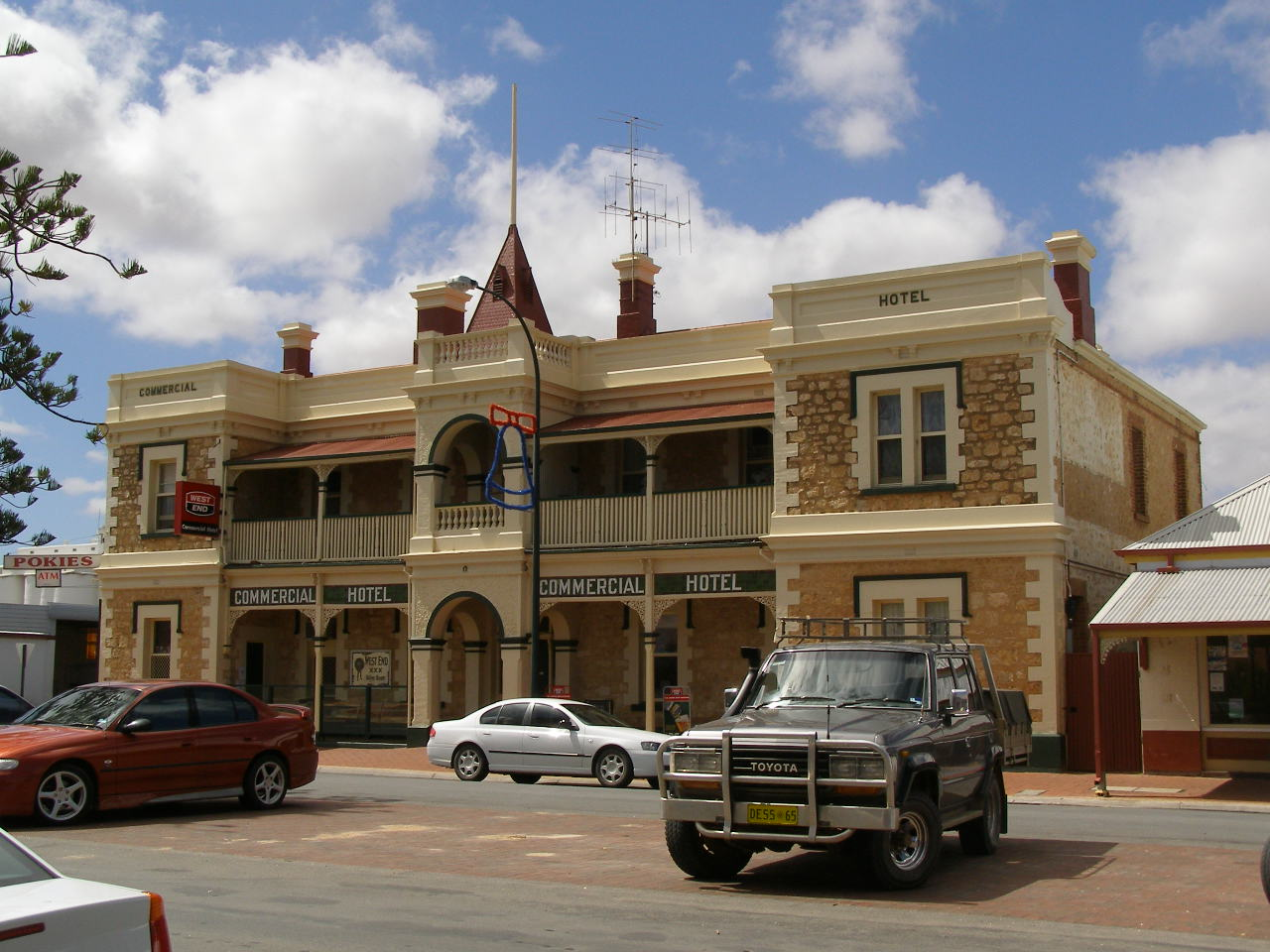
Commercial Hotel, Cowell

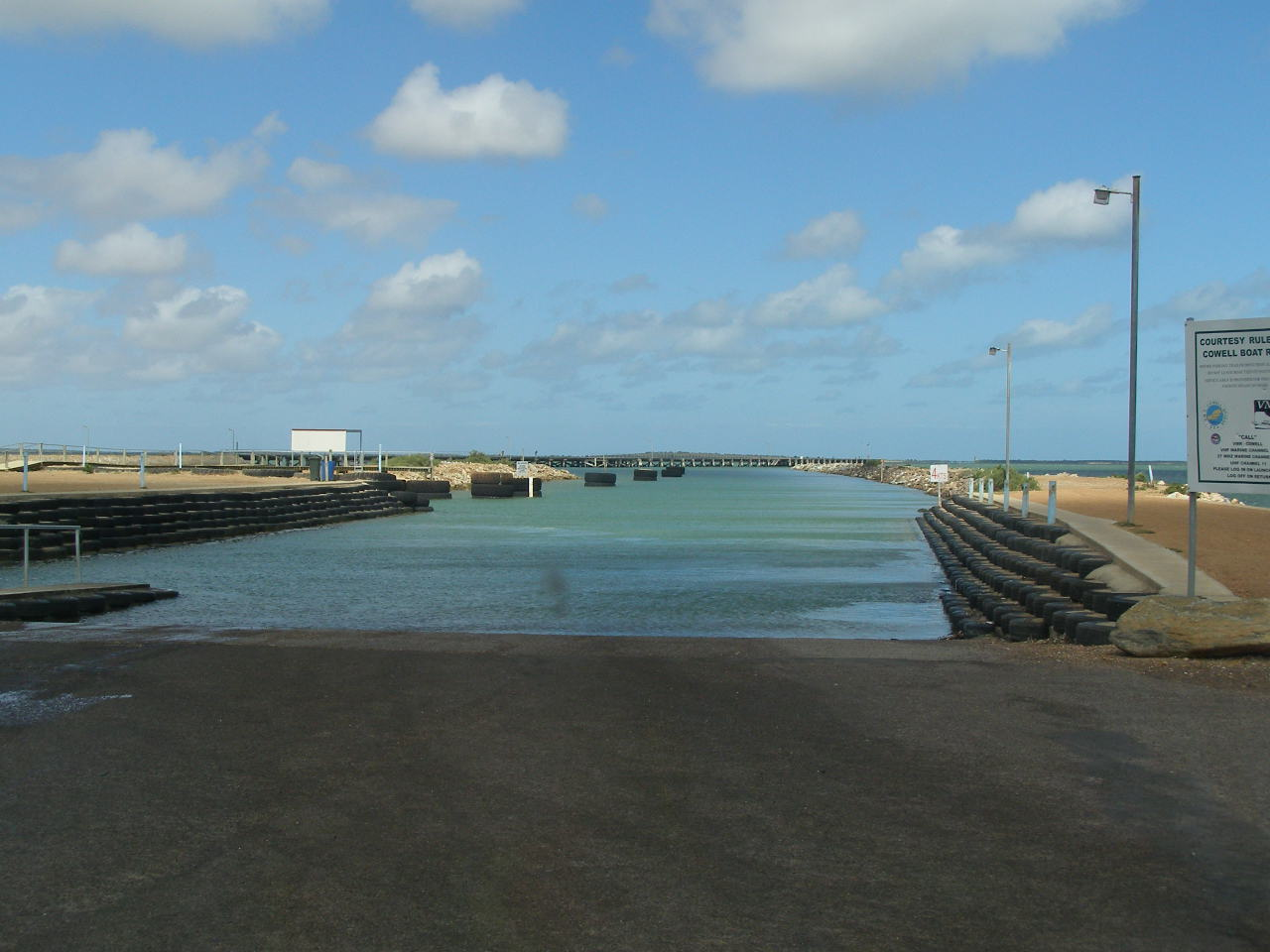
Boat ramp, Cowell

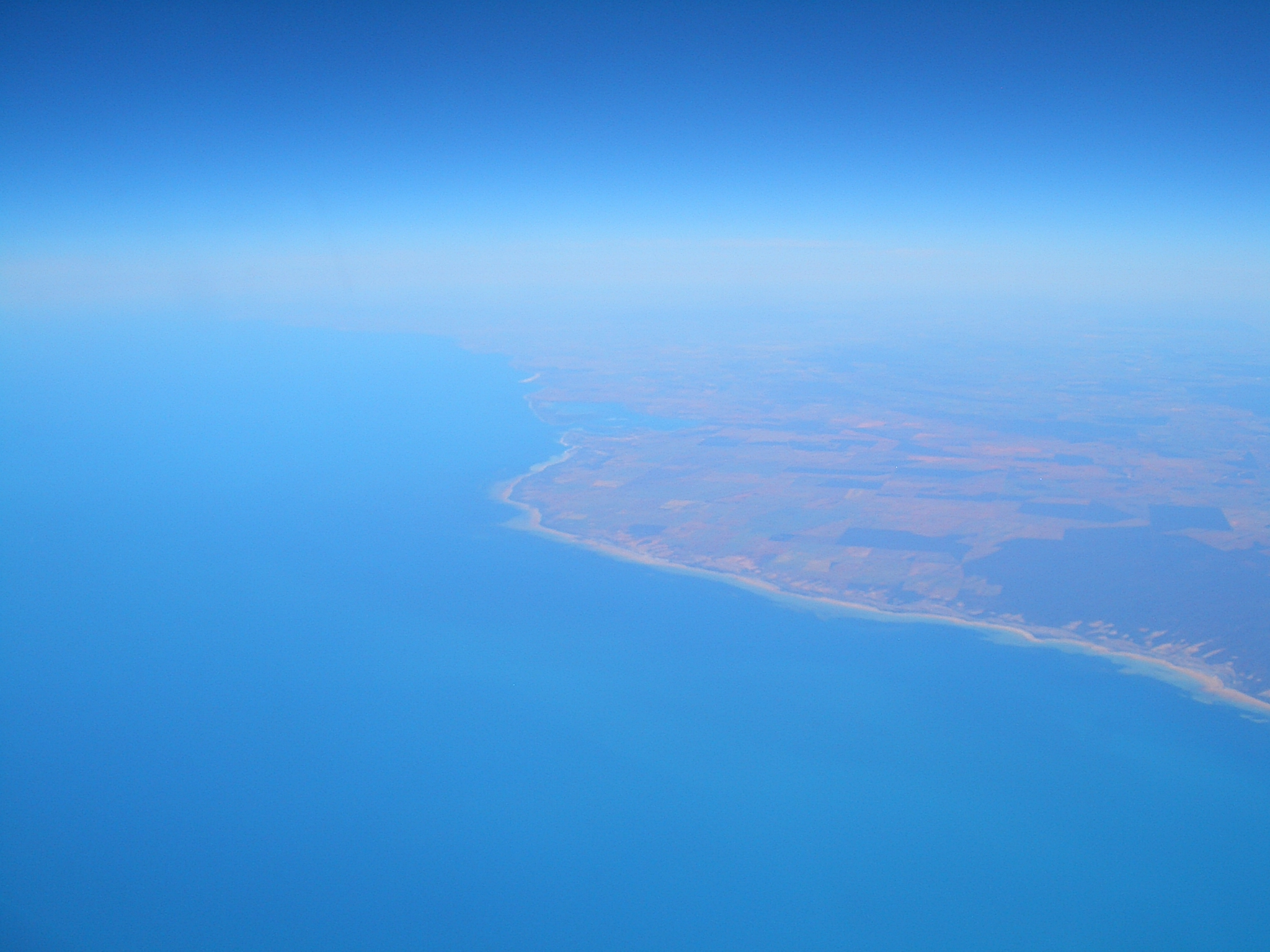
Aerial view of the area
