= Development Assessment Commission (South Australia) =

The Development Assessment Commission (DAC) is an independent statutory body which assesses and determines development application pathways and outcomes in the Australian state of South Australia. The relevant types of development assessed are prescribed in the Development Act 1993 and the associated Development Regulations 2008. The Commission has a membership of seven, including a presiding member and a deputy presiding member. Members are appointed by the Governor of South Australia.

== Membership ==
As of October 2016, current members are:

Name	Position
Chris Branford	Member
Sue Crafter	Member
Peter Dungey	Member
Helen Dyer	Deputy Presiding Member
Simone Fogarty	Presiding Member
Dennis Mutton	Member
David O'Loughlin	Member

== Former members ==
Former members of the DAC from the period 2011 to 2016 include: Ted Byrt (Presiding Member), Betty Douflias (Deputy Presiding Member), Damien Brown, Geoffrey Loveday, Megan Leydon, Carolyn Wigg, John Dagas and Andrew Ford.
