= Nicholas Cowell =

British businessman (born 1961)

- Born: Nicholas Andrew Cowell; 7 March 1961 (age 65); Elstree, Hertfordshire, England
- Education: Royal Conservatoire of Scotland
- Occupation: Real estate investor
- Relatives: Simon Cowell (brother); Tony Cowell (half-brother)

Nicholas Andrew Cowell (born 7 March 1961) is a British property developer/investor, co-founder of Estate Office Property Consultants (a business he later sold) and head of the Cowell Group. He is the brother of Simon Cowell and half-brother of author Tony Cowell.

== Life and career ==
The brothers grew up in Elstree in Hertfordshire, next door to Joan Collins. He attended Licensed Victuallers' School in Ascot for one year.

In the late 1970s he began work as an estate agency office junior at Garrard Smith & Partners and subsequently bought the company in 1983 with his business partner Adrian Levy. It was later renamed Estate Office Property Consultants, the business was sold many years later in order to focus on the Cowell Group as principal investors. In 2005 he helped launched a £400m property fund in cooperation with property syndicator aAIM Group, attracting investors like Elton John and Rod Stewart.

He also has invested in various other ventures outside of the property world including The Bike Shed Motorcycle Club which is a private members club with branches in London and Los Angeles.

== Personal life ==
Nicholas lives in London with his wife and two children.
