= Jerusalem Youth Chorus =

Youth chorus in Jerusalem

- Choir
- Origin: Jerusalem
- Founded: 2012
- Founder: Micah Hendler
- Genre: Arabic; Choral; Folk rock; Hip hop; Pop; Show tunes
- Members: 30
- Director: Amer Abu Arqub
- Artistic Director: Micah Hendler
- Chief conductor: Matan Serry
- Website: jerusalemyouthchorus.org

The Jerusalem Youth Chorus (JYC) is a joint Palestinian-Israeli youth chorus based in Jerusalem. As of October 2023, the group had 30 singers and 75 alumni, and was led by executive director Amer Abu Arqub, who is himself a JVC alum.

== Community and dialogue ==
JYC aims to promote dialogue between Israelis and Palestinians. Their weekly rehearsals include dialogue sessions bookended by musical practice. Dialogue sessions include both Jewish and Palestinian facilitators and an interpreter for chorus members who do not speak both Arabic and Hebrew.

== Repertoire ==
The chorus' repertoire includes songs in English, Arabic, and Hebrew. They have performed songs by Fairuz, Hadag Nahash, and American artists, and created their own mashups and original songs.

A recurring piece in JYC's repertoire is the song "Home", originally performed by American artist Phillip Phillips. In 2014, a video performance by the group, accompanied by Sam Tsui, received viral attention online. They created a digital performance of the song during the COVID-19 pandemic lockdowns. The song was also the chosen piece for their America's Got Talent audition in 2024.

== Demographics ==
By 2014, the group had 26 singers: 13 Israelis and 13 Palestinians.

As of May 2023, about two-thirds of JYC's singers were girls and one-third were boys; generally, more Israeli girls than boys are involved, and more Palestinian boys than girls are involved.

As of October 2023, the group had 30 singers and 75 alumni.

== History ==
The chorus was founded in 2012 by Micah Hendler, who formulated the idea while in the Seeds for Peace program. Initially, Hendler attended high schools in East and West Jerusalem to recruit teenage singers for the chorus. For the chorus's first few years, they avoided publicity, fearing their singers would receive backlash or be pressured to leave.

In 2014, JYC was featured on David Broza's album East Jerusalem/West Jerusalem.

In 2015, JYC performed on The Late Show with Stephen Colbert.

During the COVID-19 pandemic lockdowns, JYC shifted to focus on dialogue and collaborative songwriting over group singing in person.

In August 2022, JYC celebrated its tenth anniversary with a concert at the Jerusalem International YMCA.

In October 2023, JVC performed as part of the virtual concert "Voices of Peace in Times of War".

In April 2024, the group embarked on their second tour of the United States. The tour was oringally scheduled for fall 2023, but was delayed following the October 7 attacks on Israel and the beginning of the Gaza war. In June 2024, JYC released a statement officially calling for a ceasefire.

In July 2024, the group performed on the TV show competition America's Got Talent. For their audition, they performed an a cappella rendition of Phillip Phillips’s "Home".

== Notable alumni ==
- Eden Alene, Ethiopian-Israeli singer
