= Tony Cowell =

British author and journalist (born 1950)

- Born: Anthony Cowell; 1950 (age 75–76); Wales
- Occupations: Author, journalist, reporter
- Spouse: Emma (m. 2014)
- Relatives: Simon Cowell (half-brother); Nicholas Cowell (half-brother)

Anthony Cowell (born 1950) is an author, journalist and showbiz reporter, columnist for Best Magazine. He co-wrote his younger half-brother Simon Cowell's autobiography, I Don't Mean to be Rude, but...

== Work ==
Cowell is a weekly columnist for Best magazine, and is a contributor to Sky News Sunrise Breakfast Show with Eamonn Holmes, commentating on the showbiz gossip making the news. Cowell is also a regular celebrity pundit in the United States, contributing to the CBS Radio Network. In the United Kingdom, he has reported on The X Factor and Britain's Got Talent for Heart London and GMG Radio stations under his Cowell Confidential banner.

== Personal life ==
Cowell is the elder half-brother of television personality Simon Cowell and estate agent Nicholas Cowell. Tony claims to have been idolised from an early age by his younger half-brother Simon, who bought his first record, "She Loves You" by The Beatles, because Tony had recently bought that same album. Tony has a house in Cornwall with his wife, Emma Lloyd-Cowell, whom he married in May 2014.

== Books ==
- I Hate to Be Rude, But . . .: The Simon Cowell Book of Nasty Comments (2006)
- Is It Just Me or Is Everyone Famous?: From A-List to Z-List and How to Make it Yourself (2006)
- The Secret Diary of Simon Cowell (2008)
