= Port Gibbon =

Port Gibbon South Australia
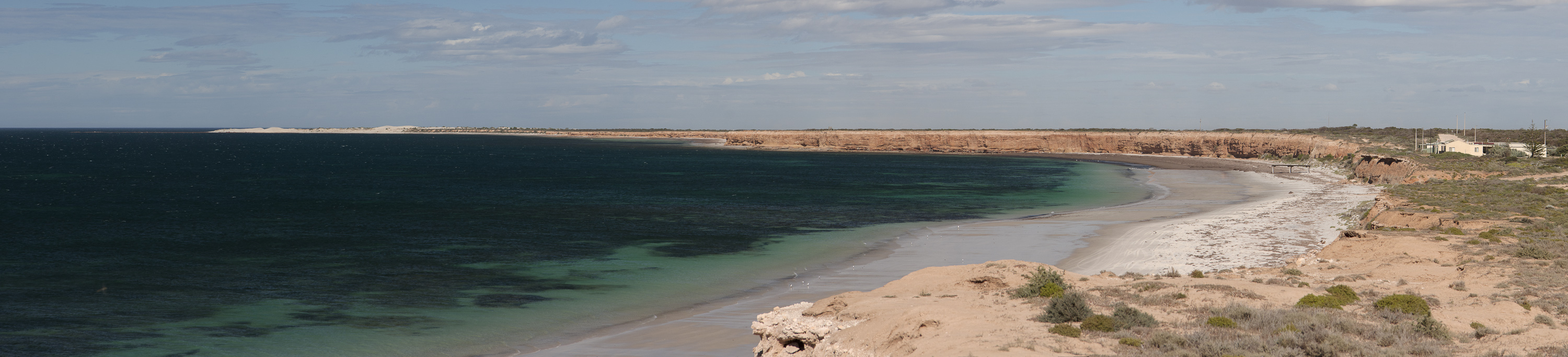
- Port Gibbon

- Coordinates: 33°48′06″S 136°47′59″E
- Population: 8 (SAL 2021)
- Established: 1916
- Postcode(s): 5602
- Time zone: ACST (UTC+9:30)
  - Summer (DST): ACST (UTC+10:30)
- Location: 208 km (129 mi) north-west of Adelaide; 17 km (11 mi) south-west of Cowell
- LGA(s): District Council of Franklin Harbour
- Region: Eyre Western
- County: Jervois
- State electorate(s): Flinders
- Federal division(s): Grey
Mean max temp	Mean min temp	Annual rainfall
22.6 °C; 73 °F	11.5 °C; 53 °F	359.6 mm 14.2 in
Suburbs around Port Gibbon:
Cowell	Cowell	Cowell
Cowell	Port Gibbon	Cowell; Spencer Gulf
Cowell; Spencer Gulf	Spencer Gulf	Spencer Gulf
- Footnotes: Distances; Coordinates; Climate; Adjoining suburbs

Port Gibbon is a locality in the Australian state of South Australia located on the east coast of Eyre Peninsula about 208 kilometres (129 miles) north-west of the state capital of Adelaide and about 17 kilometres (11 miles) south-west of the municipal seat in Cowell.

Port Gibbon began as a town surveyed in 1916 and whose name was derived from Captain J H Gibbon who was the “Senior Nautical Warden of the (South Australian) Marine Board.” Following lobbying of the state government by local residents, a jetty and an associated cutting in the adjoining cliff line were constructed in 1915 to replace a pair of chutes installed by private companies used to move bags of grain to the beach for loading onto small boats for conveyance to larger vessel anchored off the coastline. It operated as a commercial facility until 1950 and as of 2005, had been demolished with the exception of a section on the beach which is used as a shelter. Boundaries for the locality were created in 1998 and include both the Port Gibbon shack site and the Government Town of Port Gibbon.

Port Gibbon consists of land on the coastline with Spencer Gulf which extends from a headland called Point Gibbon (formerly Point Price) in the south for a distance of about 5 kilometres (3.1 mi) along the southern end of an unnamed bay whose northern end terminates at a headland called The Knob in the adjoining locality of Cowell. The coastline consists of a series of beaches backing onto a cliff line of “red bluffs composed of Pleistocene alluvium” with heights up to 10 metres (33 ft). A settlement is located at the middle of the bay behind the cliff line. A road runs along the coast both south and north of the settlement.

Land use in Port Gibbon is divided between primary industry, conservation and residential with the former being represented by “broadacre farming of cereals and livestock”, the second being represented by the zoning of the land adjoining the coastline with Spencer Gulf and the latter consisting of the settlement mentioned above.

Port Gibbon is located within the federal division of Grey, the state electoral district of Flinders and the local government area of the District Council of Franklin Harbour.
