= Jack Cowell =

English footballer

Personal information
- Full name: John Cowell
- Date of birth: 9 June 1887
- Place of birth: Blyth, Northumberland, England
- Position: Forward

Youth career
- 1902–1903: Springwell
- 1903–1904: Rowlands Gill
- 1904–1905: Spen Black & White

Senior career*
Years	Team	Apps	(Gls)
1905–1906	Castleford Town		
1906–1907	Selby Mizpah		
1907–1909	Rotherham Town		
1909–1910	Bristol City	37	(20)
1910–1911	Sunderland	14	(5)
1911–1912	Distillery		
1912–1914	Belfast Celtic		
1919–19??	Durham City		
- * Club domestic league appearances and goals

John Cowell (born 9 June 1887) was an English professional footballer who played as a forward for Sunderland.
