= John G. Cowell =

- Born: September 18, 1785; Marblehead, Massachusetts, U.S.
- Died: April 18, 1814 (aged 28); Valparaíso, Chile
- Cause of death: Killed in action
- Occupation: United States Navy officer
- Known for: Death during a skirmish

John G. Cowell (September 18, 1785 – April 18, 1814) was an officer in the United States Navy during the War of 1812.

Born in Marblehead, Massachusetts, Cowell entered the Navy as a master 21 January 1809. As acting lieutenant, Cowell was severely wounded, losing a leg, in the action on 28 March 1814 between USS Essex and HMS Phoebe and HMS Cherub off Valparaíso, Chile. Refusing to be carried below, Cowell cheered his companions on through the remainder of the action. He was carried on shore where he died on 18 April that the people of Valparaíso honored him with a burial place in their principal church; a most unusual honor for a foreigner.

Two destroyers have been named USS Cowell for him.
