= Cowleds Landing, South Australia =

Cowleds Landing South Australia
- Coordinates: 33°09′27″S 137°26′28″E
- Established: 2011
- Postcode(s): 5601
- Time zone: ACST (UTC+9:30)
  - Summer (DST): ACST (UTC+10:30)
- Location: 225 km (140 mi) north-west of Adelaide; 18 km (11 mi) south-west of Whyalla
- LGA(s): City of Whyalla
- State electorate(s): Giles
- Federal division(s): Grey
Suburbs around Cowleds Landing:
Middleback Range	Middleback Range	Middleback Range
Middleback Range	Cowleds Landing	Spencer Gulf
Middleback Range	Middleback Range	Spencer Gulf
- Footnotes: Adjoining localities

Cowleds Landing is a locality in the Australian state of South Australia located on the east coast of the Eyre Peninsula overlooking Spencer Gulf about 225 kilometres (140 miles) north-west of the state capital of Adelaide and about 18 kilometres (11 miles) south-west of the municipal seat of Whyalla.

Its boundaries were created in December 2011. The name is derived from Cowleds Landing Shack Site whose site is located within the locality's boundaries. The name was attributed to Humphrey David Cowled who owned the adjoining sheep station, 'Nonowie', in the late 19th and early 20th century. He and his family developed a landing for small vessels to collect produce and deliver goods on the coast of what is now the locality during the 19th century.

As of 2015, Cowleds Landing consists of a strip of land along the coast of an unnamed bay and contains a settlement consisting of a street of low-rise dwellings. The majority of the locality is zoned for conservation purposes with the view of providing limited built development intended principally for recreational and tourism uses, which has a minimal impact and where provided, complements the environment of the locality.

Cowleds Landing is located within the federal division of Grey, the state electoral district of Giles and the local government area of the City of Whyalla.

== See also ==
- Whyalla - Cowleds Landing Aquatic Reserve
