= Electoral results for the district of Giles =

South Australian district election results

This is a list of electoral results for the Electoral district of Giles in South Australian state elections.

== Members for Giles ==
| Member | Party | Term |
|---|---|---|
| Frank Blevins | Labor | 1993–1997 |
| Lyn Breuer | Labor | 1997–2014 |
| Eddie Hughes | Labor | 2014–present |

== Election results ==
=== Elections in the 2020s ===
==== 2026 ====
2026 South Australian state election: Giles
| Party | Candidate | Votes | % | ±% |
|---|---|---|---|---|
| Labor | Eddie Hughes | 10,450 | 48.7 | −9.3 |
| One Nation | Barry Drage | 7,122 | 33.2 | +26.8 |
| Liberal | Sunny Singh | 2,005 | 9.3 | −8.5 |
| Greens | Alex Taylor | 1,150 | 5.4 | +1.5 |
| Family First | Gary Balfort | 491 | 2.3 | −0.5 |
| Australian Family | Jasper Price | 242 | 1.1 | +1.1 |
| Total formal votes | | 21,460 | 96.7 | −0.9 |
| Informal votes | | 731 | 3.3 | +0.9 |
| Turnout | | 22,191 | 81.5 | −7.5 |
Two-candidate-preferred result
| Labor | Eddie Hughes | 12,547 | 58.5 | −12.5 |
| One Nation | Barry Drage | 8,913 | 41.5 | +41.5 |
| Labor hold | | | | |

==== 2022 ====
2022 South Australian state election: Giles
| Party | Candidate | Votes | % | ±% |
|---|---|---|---|---|
| Labor | Eddie Hughes | 11,285 | 58.0 | +10.1 |
| Liberal | Graham Taylor | 3,460 | 17.8 | −2.5 |
| SA-Best | Tom Antonio | 2,171 | 11.2 | −11.9 |
| One Nation | Barry Drage | 1,236 | 6.4 | +6.4 |
| Greens | Jane Mount | 753 | 3.9 | −0.2 |
| Family First | John McComb | 536 | 2.8 | +2.8 |
| Total formal votes | | 19,441 | 96.4 | |
| Informal votes | | 725 | 3.6 | |
| Turnout | | 20,166 | 80.8 | |
Two-party-preferred result
| Labor | Eddie Hughes | 13,798 | 71.0 | +6.1 |
| Liberal | Graham Taylor | 5,643 | 29.0 | −6.1 |
| Labor hold | | Swing | +6.1 | |

Distribution of preferences: Giles
| Party | Candidate | Votes | Round 1 | | Round 2 | | Round 3 | | Round 4 | |
| Party | Candidate | Votes | Dist. | Total | Dist. | Total | Dist. | Total | Dist. | Total |
|---|---|---|---|---|---|---|---|---|---|---|
| Quota (50% + 1) | | 9,721 | | | | | | | | |
| Labor | Eddie Hughes | 11,285 | +88 | 11,373 | +494 | 11,867 | +354 | 12,221 | +1,577 | 13,798 |
| Liberal | Graham Taylor | 3,460 | +82 | 3,542 | +75 | 3,617 | +315 | 3,932 | +1,711 | 5,643 |
| SA-Best | Tom Antonio | 2,171 | +156 | 2,327 | +137 | 2,464 | +824 | 3,288 | Excluded | |
| One Nation | Barry Drage | 1,236 | +141 | 1,377 | +116 | 1,493 | Excluded | | | |
| Greens | Jane Mount | 753 | +69 | 822 | Excluded | | | | | |
| Family First | John McComb | 536 | Excluded | | | | | | | |

=== Elections in the 2010s ===
==== 2018 ====
2018 South Australian state election: Giles
| Party | Candidate | Votes | % | ±% |
|---|---|---|---|---|
| Labor | Eddie Hughes | 9,176 | 47.0 | −2.7 |
| SA-Best | Tom Antonio | 5,070 | 25.9 | +25.9 |
| Liberal | Mark Walsh | 3,611 | 18.5 | −20.8 |
| Greens | Anna Taylor | 713 | 3.6 | −1.3 |
| Conservatives | Cheryl Kaminski | 502 | 2.6 | −3.6 |
| Dignity | Cyanne Westerman | 470 | 2.4 | +2.4 |
| Total formal votes | | 19,542 | 96.7 | −0.3 |
| Informal votes | | 662 | 3.3 | +0.3 |
| Turnout | | 20,204 | 86.0 | −1.5 |
Two-party-preferred result
| Labor | Eddie Hughes | 12,732 | 65.2 | +10.0 |
| Liberal | Mark Walsh | 6,810 | 34.8 | −10.0 |
Two-candidate-preferred result
| Labor | Eddie Hughes | 11,222 | 57.4 | +2.2 |
| SA-Best | Tom Antonio | 8,320 | 42.6 | +42.6 |
| Labor hold | | Swing | +2.2 | |

2014 South Australian state election: Giles
| Party | Candidate | Votes | % | ±% |
|---|---|---|---|---|
| Labor | Eddie Hughes | 9,800 | 51.4 | −1.2 |
| Liberal | Bernadette Abraham | 7,134 | 37.4 | +8.1 |
| Family First | Cheryl Kaminski | 1,196 | 6.3 | +0.3 |
| Greens | Alison Sentance | 942 | 4.9 | −7.2 |
| Total formal votes | | 19,072 | 97.0 | +0.6 |
| Informal votes | | 581 | 3.0 | −0.6 |
| Turnout | | 19,653 | 86.5 | −1.6 |
Two-party-preferred result
| Labor | Eddie Hughes | 10,877 | 57.0 | −4.9 |
| Liberal | Bernadette Abraham | 8,195 | 43.0 | +4.9 |
| Labor hold | | Swing | −4.9 | |

2010 South Australian state election: Giles
| Party | Candidate | Votes | % | ±% |
|---|---|---|---|---|
| Labor | Lyn Breuer | 9,943 | 52.6 | −7.3 |
| Liberal | Chad Oldfield | 5,533 | 29.3 | +1.0 |
| Greens | Andrew Melville-Smith | 2,290 | 12.1 | +7.6 |
| Family First | Cheryl Kaminski | 1,134 | 6.0 | +0.1 |
| Total formal votes | | 18,900 | 96.2 | |
| Informal votes | | 693 | 3.8 | |
| Turnout | | 19,593 | 88.1 | |
Two-party-preferred result
| Labor | Lyn Breuer | 11,696 | 61.9 | −4.5 |
| Liberal | Chad Oldfield | 7,204 | 38.1 | +4.5 |
| Labor hold | | Swing | −4.5 | |

=== Elections in the 2000s ===
2006 South Australian state election: Giles
| Party | Candidate | Votes | % | ±% |
|---|---|---|---|---|
| Labor | Lyn Breuer | 11,121 | 58.2 | +8.9 |
| Liberal | Tina Wakelin | 5,775 | 30.2 | +0.3 |
| Family First | Cheryl Kaminski | 1,106 | 5.8 | +5.8 |
| Greens | Kieran Turnbull | 854 | 4.5 | +4.5 |
| No Rodeo | Esmond Vettoretti | 257 | 1.3 | +1.3 |
| Total formal votes | | 19,113 | 96.6 | −0.7 |
| Informal votes | | 677 | 3.4 | +0.7 |
| Turnout | | 19,790 | 86.5 | −0.6 |
Two-party-preferred result
| Labor | Lyn Breuer | 12,317 | 64.4 | +4.7 |
| Liberal | Tina Wakelin | 6,796 | 35.6 | −4.7 |
| Labor hold | | Swing | +4.7 | |

2002 South Australian state election: Giles
| Party | Candidate | Votes | % | ±% |
|---|---|---|---|---|
| Labor | Lyn Breuer | 8,742 | 49.6 | +1.5 |
| Liberal | Jim Pollock | 5,272 | 29.9 | +0.4 |
| Democrats | Clint Garrett | 1,664 | 9.4 | −7.3 |
| Independent | John Smith | 1,404 | 8.0 | +8.0 |
| One Nation | Valarie Nas | 538 | 3.1 | +3.1 |
| Total formal votes | | 17,620 | 97.3 | |
| Informal votes | | 489 | 2.7 | |
| Turnout | | 18,109 | 87.1 | |
Two-party-preferred result
| Labor | Lyn Breuer | 10,527 | 59.7 | −1.8 |
| Liberal | Jim Pollock | 7,093 | 40.3 | +1.8 |
| Labor hold | | Swing | −1.8 | |

=== Elections in the 1990s ===
1997 South Australian state election: Giles
| Party | Candidate | Votes | % | ±% |
|---|---|---|---|---|
| Labor | Lyn Breuer | 8,734 | 48.1 | +7.4 |
| Liberal | Terry Stephens | 5,361 | 29.5 | −3.2 |
| Democrats | Clint Garrett | 3,041 | 16.7 | +5.4 |
| United Australia | Terry Sotos | 1,026 | 5.6 | +5.6 |
| Total formal votes | | 18,162 | 96.7 | −0.9 |
| Informal votes | | 616 | 3.3 | +0.9 |
| Turnout | | 18,778 | 86.8 | |
Two-party-preferred result
| Labor | Lyn Breuer | 11,159 | 61.4 | +7.0 |
| Liberal | Terry Stephens | 7,003 | 38.6 | −7.0 |
| Labor hold | | Swing | +7.0 | |

1993 South Australian state election: Giles
| Party | Candidate | Votes | % | ±% |
|---|---|---|---|---|
| Labor | Frank Blevins | 7,298 | 39.0 | −7.0 |
| Liberal | Terry Stephens | 6,330 | 33.8 | +4.1 |
| Independent | Keith Wilson | 2,925 | 15.6 | +15.6 |
| Democrats | George Crowe | 2,164 | 11.6 | +3.4 |
| Total formal votes | | 18,717 | 97.7 | +0.5 |
| Informal votes | | 434 | 2.3 | −0.5 |
| Turnout | | 19,151 | 92.8 | |
Two-party-preferred result
| Labor | Frank Blevins | 9,816 | 52.4 | −2.8 |
| Liberal | Terry Stephens | 8,901 | 47.6 | +2.8 |
| Labor hold | | Swing | −2.8 | |
