= Mullaquana, South Australia =

Mullaquana
- Suburb
- Interactive map of Mullaquana
- Coordinates: 33°03′37″S 137°31′40″E
- Country: Australia
- State: South Australia
- Region: Eyre Western
- LGA: City of Whyalla unincorporated area
- Established: 2000

Government
  - State electorate: Giles
  - Federal division: Grey
- Elevation airport: 9 m (30 ft)

Population
  - Total: 272 (SAL 2021)
- Time zone: UTC+9:30 (ACST)
  - Summer (DST): UTC+10:30 (ACST)
- Postcode: 5601
- County: York
- Mean max temp: 23.8 °C (74.8 °F)
- Mean min temp: 11.5 °C (52.7 °F)
- Annual rainfall: 263.4 mm (10.37 in)
Suburbs around Mullaquana
Middleback Range	Whyalla Norrie; Whyalla Stuart; Whyalla Playford	Whyalla (suburb)
Middleback Range	Mullaquana	Spencer Gulf
Middleback Range	Middleback Range	Spencer Gulf

Mullaquana is a suburb in the Australian state of South Australia located immediately adjoining the southern side of the city of Whyalla in the north east corner of Eyre Peninsula. The locality is bounded by Lincoln Highway to its northern side, the suburb of Whyalla to the east and by and the Spencer Gulf coastline to the south east.

Its boundaries were established in June 2000 and revised again in 2011. Its name is derived from Mullaquana Road which is located within the locality and was selected instead of “Eight Mile Creek” in order to avoid confusion with a locality in the south east of South Australia.

Mullaquana is located within the federal Division of Grey, the state electoral district of Giles and with the portion on western side of Horseshoe Road being within the boundary of local government area of the City of Whyalla and the portion on the eastern side being within the unincorporated areas of South Australia.

The land within the City of Whyalla jurisdiction contains the Whyalla Airport and areas zoned for both commercial activity and residential use. The land within the unincorporated area is one of two such parcels of land associated with the city of Whyalla which is considered by the Government of South Australia as being “strategically important to the state” due to their role in the production cycle of steel.

== See also ==
- List of cities and towns in South Australia
