= Stuart High School =

Stuart High School may refer to:

- Stuart High School (Nebraska), Stuart, Nebraska
- Stuart High School (Oklahoma), Stuart, Oklahoma
- Stuart High School (Whyalla), City of Whyalla, South Australia
- J. E. B. Stuart High School, Falls Church, Virginia
- Stuart Training School, Stuart, Florida
- Martin County High School, Stuart, Florida
