= D'Faces of Youth Arts =

D'Faces of Youth Arts is a community youth arts organisation based in Whyalla, South Australia. It provides workshops and activities for young people aged 4 to 26 in theatre, dance, circus, visual arts and music and members participate in a broad range of public events including performances, festivals and parades. The organisation celebrated its 21st anniversary in 2016. As of 2022 the organisation is funded by Carclew, plus project specific partners and sponsors.

== History ==
The organisation was created in 1994 by Phillipa Sutherland.

In 1998, D'Faces presented Shoot Me Now, a work investigating the subject of suicide in regional Australia. It was written by Fiona Sprott and directed by James Winter.

In 1999, D'Faces presented Beautiful People at the Middleback Theatre in Whyalla. It was directed by Sasha Zahra.

During the early mid-2000s, Country Arts SA Officer Suzannah Jones was asked to take on the Company due to concerns with their precarious funding situation. Suzannah re positioned the Company from a youth theatre company to a youth arts organisation, to include visual arts, digital art and music. Programs included the long-term aerosol art program Massive Art, with artist Jimmy C. Suzannah was also responsible for securing funding from Australia Council for the Arts for the theatre production Open Arms about the emerging relationships between the youth of Whyalla and detainees in Baxter Detention Centre. Within four years, Suzannah, along with Company Manager Cathy Thompson, secured four-year funding from Australia Council for the Arts and was the recipient of an SA Great Award for the Arts for the Eyre Peninsula Region. Youth participants in d'faces programs have gone on to careers in the arts, including Dan Daw, and Kaine Sultan_Babij . Other artists engaged in D'Faces of Youth Arts projects included Jo Zealand, James Cochran, Finegan Kruckemeyer, The New Pollutants, Alex Bickford, Annmarie Kohn, Nick O'Connor, Tamara Watson, Catheryne James, Nicky Ashby, MC Simplex and others.

In 2005, D'Faces presented Open Arms, a play about refugees and immigration, funded by Australia Council for the Arts, produced by Suzannah Jones, written by Bryan Martin, directed by Priya Goldfinch.

In 2006, D'Faces moved from the Middleback Theatre to a premises at 14 Viscount Slim Avenue, Whyalla Norrie. That year D'Faces presented Limitations, written and directed by Stephen House.

In 2008, D'Faces produced Artists Not Aliens, a short experimental film exploring Whyalla's preoccupation with sports and the alienation experienced by artists in the town. The film was directed by Jennifer Lyons-Reid and produced by Karl Kuddell.

In 2009, D'Faces worked with Snuff Puppets on the People's Puppets Project which led to performances at the Come Out Festival in Adelaide, at the Adelaide Airport and in Whyalla. Artists involved included Andy Freer, Erin Hall, Daniele Poidomani and Nick Wilson.

Creative directors of D'Faces of Youth Arts have included Daniel Clarke, Sascha Zahra, Suzannah Jones, Suzie Skinner (appointed in 2007), Deborah Hughes (appointed in 2013), Robert Golding, Olivia White, Samuel Wannan and Anastasia Beasley.

At the time of Anastasia Beasley's appointment, D'faces was funded by Carclew

=== 2014-2022 ===
In 2014, Cirkids ran a circus skills workshop at D'Faces. Rob Golding ran Club Clown, building children's performance skills and Michal Hughes represented D'Faces at a workshop to encourage Whyalla participation in the SA History Festival. D'Faces provided face-painting for Denise Sharp's workshop on making things from natural materials at the Whyalla library. Artist Silvia Friedrich led the Interactive Tactile Sculpture Jungle project to promote creativity through repurposing waste materials. The organisation held an open day during Whyalla Pride Week in October 2014. That year, the organisation won the Dr+Group Arts Award at the Whyalla and Eyre Peninsula Regional Awards, presented by Brand SA.

In 2015, D'Faces' creative director was Deb Hughes. That year, the organisation partnered with the City of Whyalla to repaint the RiskIt skate park in bold colours, led by visual artist Matt Stuckey. The group held workshops at Fishy Fringe supported by OneSteel and Arrium Mining. Fishy Fringe was also sponsored by BHP Billiton. D'Faces hosted a songwriting workshop by I.R.I.S. during National Youth Week. D'Faces held two workshop events during SA History Week: That was then... and Whyalla Stories.

In 2016, D'Faces presented a performance of Twisted Fairy Tales, supported by OneSteel, Arrium Mining, and Carclew Youth Arts. The show also functioned as a farewell to Michal Hughes. That year, D'Faces also participated in the City of Whyalla's inaugural Rainbow Run, the inaugural McRitchie Park Fun Day, and the launch of the Kids Matter initiative.

In 2017 the organisation was involved in the inaugural UneARTh Festival, a partnership between Adelaide Fringe and the City of Whyalla. The group offered performance workshops through their creation: The Chthonic Circus. A $6500 charitable donation from the organisation YTAP (Young Tradespeople and Professionals) was used to purchase new circus equipment. A DJing workshop was provided by DJ Tr!p and D'Faces also participated in the 2017 GFG Alliance Christmas pageant. The organisation received further $2750 grant from the Australian Government's Stronger Communities initiative to purchase more circus equipment. In 2017, D'Faces' Deb Hughes was also working as the City of Whyalla's Arts & Cultural Facilitator.

In 2018, D'Faces was managed by Olivia White. The organisation received funding from the Australian Government's Regional Arts Fund, Country Arts SA, the Whyalla City Council, Carclew Youth Arts and community fundraising. D'Faces presented Area 53 at the UneARTh Festival, directed by Claire Glenn and Anthony Kelly. The organisation also participated in Whyalla's ANZAC Eve Vigil for the first time. Area 53 went on to win Best Community or Regional Event or Project at the Arts South Australia 2018 Ruby Awards

== Board ==
As of 2022, the board membership of D'faces of Youth Arts Inc. is as follows:

Name	Position	Relevant interests
Deborah Hughes	Chair	Previous Company Manager
Ethan Klobucar	Treasurer	
Michal Hughes	Member	Regional performing artist
Robert Golding	Member	Previous Company Manager
Samuel Wannan	Member	Artist, Previous Company Manager
Baerbel McDougall	Member	
Darren McDougall	Member	

== Alumni ==
Alumni of D'Faces of Youth Arts include performer and playwright, Laura Desmond and dancer and choreographer, Dan Daw.
