= Murninnie Beach, South Australia =

Murminnie Beach South Australia
- Coordinates: 33.31349379°S 137.38022215°E
- Population: 36 (SAL 2016)
- Established: 2011
- Postcode(s): 5601
- Time zone: ACST (UTC+9:30)
  - Summer (DST): ACST (UTC+10:30)
- Location: 212 km (132 mi) north-west of Adelaide; 36 km (22 mi) south-west of Whyalla
- LGA(s): City of Whyalla
- State electorate(s): Giles
- Federal division(s): Grey
Mean max temp	Mean min temp	Annual rainfall
23.7 °C; 75 °F	11.5 °C; 53 °F	271.3 mm 10.7 in
Suburbs around Murminnie Beach:
Middleback Range	Middleback Range	Spencer Gulf
Middleback Range	Murminnie Beach	Spencer Gulf
Midgee	Midgee	Midgee
- Footnotes: Coordinates; Locations; Climate; Adjoining localities

Murminnie Beach is a locality in the Australian state of South Australia located on the east coast of the Eyre Peninsula overlooking Spencer Gulf about 212 kilometres (132 miles) north-west of the state capital of Adelaide and about 36 kilometres (22 miles) south-west of the municipal seat of Whyalla.

Its boundaries were created in December 2011. The name is derived from Murninnie Beach Shack Site whose site is located within the locality's boundaries.

As of 2015, Murminnie Beach consists of an area of land adjoining the coastline and containing a settlement consisting of several streets of low-rise dwellings. The majority of the locality is zoned for conservation purposes with the view of providing limited built development intended principally for recreational and tourism uses, which has a minimal impact and where provided, complements the environment of the locality.

Murminnie Beach is located within the federal division of Grey, the state electoral district of Giles and the local government area of the City of Whyalla.
