= Iron Prince =

Iron Prince may refer to:

- Iron Prince, South Australia, an iron ore mine connected to a port and steelworks at Whyalla
- SS Iron Prince, a steamship owned by BHP, built 1909 and wrecked 1923
