= Whyalla Playford, South Australia =

Whyalla Playford
- Suburb
- Interactive map of Whyalla Playford
- Coordinates: 33.03°S 137.57°E
- Country: Australia
- State: South Australia
- City: Whyalla
- LGA: City of Whyalla
- Location: 2 km (1.2 mi) west of Whyalla
- Established: 2 March 1967

Government
  - State electorate: Giles
  - Federal division: Grey

Population
  - Total: 2,540 (SAL 2021)
- Postcode: 5600
Suburbs around Whyalla Playford
	Whyalla Barson
Whyalla Norrie	Whyalla Playford	Whyalla
	Mullaquana

Whyalla Playford is a suburb of Whyalla in South Australia. It is bounded on the east and south by the Lincoln Highway and on the north by the BHP Whyalla Tramway. It was gazetted in 1967 with the boundaries adjusted in 1975 and 2000.

The Catholic Church in the suburb is dedicated to St. Theresa.
