= Whyalla - Cowleds Landing Aquatic Reserve =

Protected area in South Australia

Whyalla-Cowleds Landing Aquatic Reserve
- IUCN category II (national park)
- Location within South Australia
- Location: South Australia
- Nearest city: Whyalla
- Coordinates: 33.1269°S 137.5059°E
- Area: 36.48 km^{2} (14.09 sq mi)
- Established: 28 June 1984
- Governing body: Primary Industries and Regions SA (PIRSA)

Whyalla-Cowleds Landing Aquatic Reserve is a marine protected area in the Australian state of South Australia located in the waters of Spencer Gulf adjoining the east coast of Eyre Peninsula. About 20 kilometres (12 mi) south of Whyalla, it includes land in the localities of Cowleds Landing and Middleback Range which is subject to tidal inundation. It was declared in 1984 to protect "the mangrove-seagrass communities and associated fish nursery areas".

Since 2012, it has been located within the boundaries of a "sanctuary zone" in the Upper Spencer Gulf Marine Park.

The aquatic reserve is classified as an IUCN Category II protected area.

== See also ==
- Protected areas of South Australia
