= Whyalla Jenkins, South Australia =

Whyalla Jenkins Whyalla, South Australia
- Coordinates: 33°01′42″S 137°30′24″E
- Population: 1,961 (SAL 2021)
- Postcode(s): 5609
- Location: 7 km (4 mi) west of Whyalla
- LGA(s): City of Whyalla
- State electorate(s): Giles
- Federal division(s): Grey
Suburbs around Whyalla Jenkins:
Middleback Range	Middleback Range	Whyalla Stuart
Middleback Range	Whyalla Jenkins	Whyalla Stuart
Whyalla Stuart	Whyalla Stuart	Whyalla Stuart
- Footnotes: Adjoining suburbs

Whyalla Jenkins is a suburb of the city of Whyalla in South Australia. It was named in 1975 and the boundaries were confirmed in June 2000.
