= Whyalla High School =

High school in Whyalla, South Australia

Coordinates: 33°02′S 137°35′E

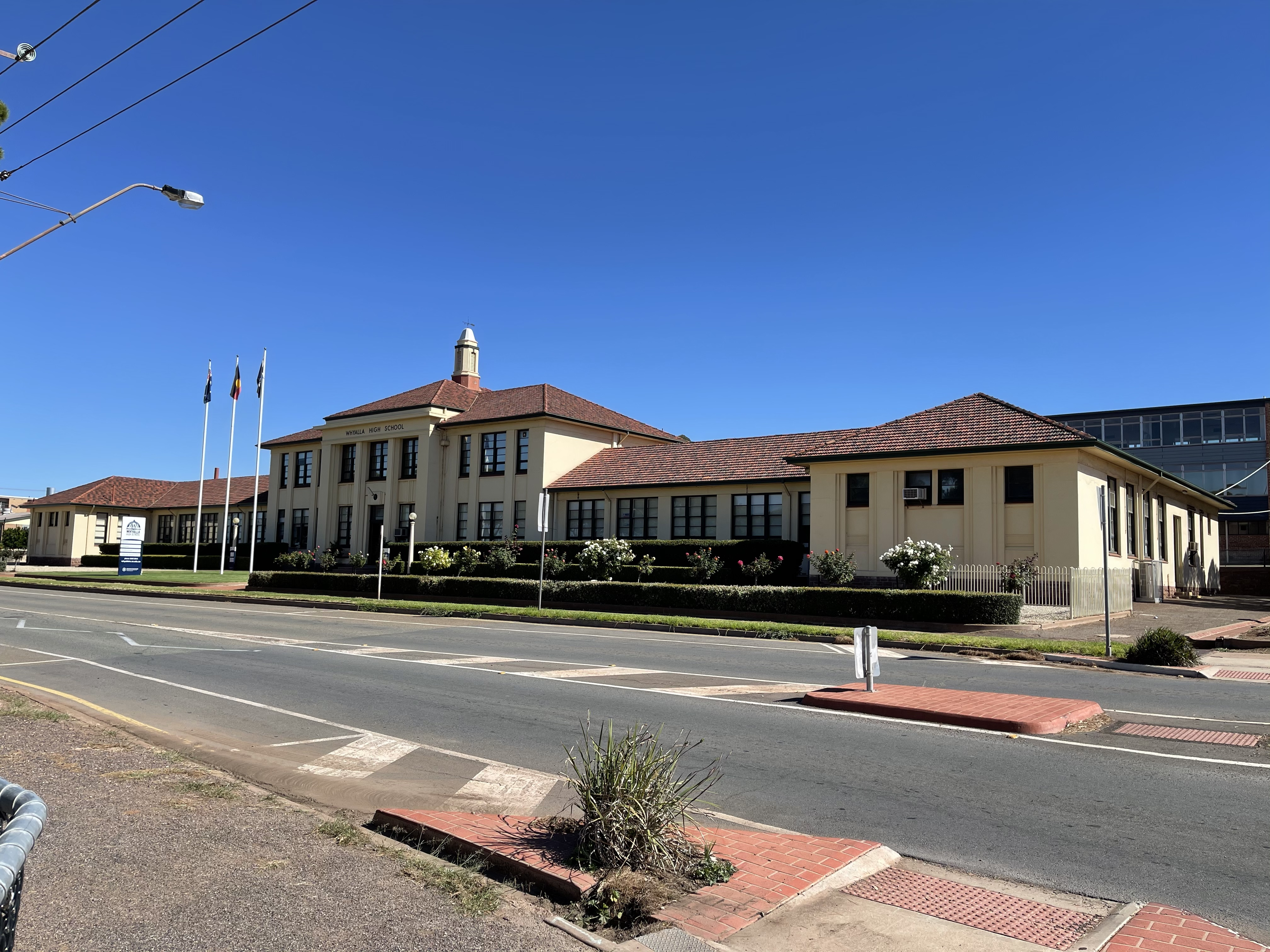

Whyalla High School was a high school located in the city of Whyalla in the Australian state of South Australia catering for school years 8–10.

It was the first high school built in Whyalla. It was built by BHP in 1943, as a Technical school for BHP’s Whyalla Steelworks apprentices to be educated at. The school catered for year 8 to year 12. There were 113 students who were originally enrolled at the school. In 1965–1966 temporary buildings (portables) were put up to hold the extra students, in 1966 there was 1,284 students at Whyalla Technical High School, in 1965 there was 1,480 students enrolled. Students were sent to Memorial Oval Primary School because there wasn't enough room to hold them all at the school. Soon after this Eyre Technical High School was opened as a year 8 to 12 school.

In 1971, the school changed its name from Whyalla Technical High School to Whyalla High School. In the late 1980s, Whyalla High Schools student population was the largest of the three government high schools. However Eyre High Schools numbers had fallen and the school was expected to close. The state government however decided that Eyre High School should stay due to its proximity to the TAFE and UniSA campus. A plan was created where Eyre High School would become the Year 11–12 school, and Stuart and Whyalla High Schools would cater for years 8 to 10. Despite great opposition from the Stuart High and Whyalla High parents and students, the plan went ahead and the last group of year 12 students finished in 1991. In 1991 the Whyalla Secondary College was established and the portable buildings were removed from Whyalla High School.Whyalla, South Australia.

In 1998–2001 the school had record low enrolments, only having around 180 students, in 1998 only 40 students enrolled at Whyalla High School. This brought up the question "Was Whyalla High School needed?". There was discussion of the school closing but because of the rise in enrolments the school was saved. Between 2002 and 2007 the school has gone from 180 enrolments to 400. In 2020, the school had 505 students enrolled.

The original school building is listed on the South Australian Heritage Register.

Whyalla High School was officially closed on 17 December 2021 at an official closing ceremony where the school flags were lowered, a time capsule was buried at the front of the school and the front doors at the school entrance locked for the final time. Stuart High School and Edward John Eyre High School also closed, and all three public schools merged to create Whyalla Secondary College. The new merged school opened in 2022, and is located on a new campus on Nicolson Avenue, Whyalla Norrie between the Whyalla campuses of the University of South Australia and TAFE SA.

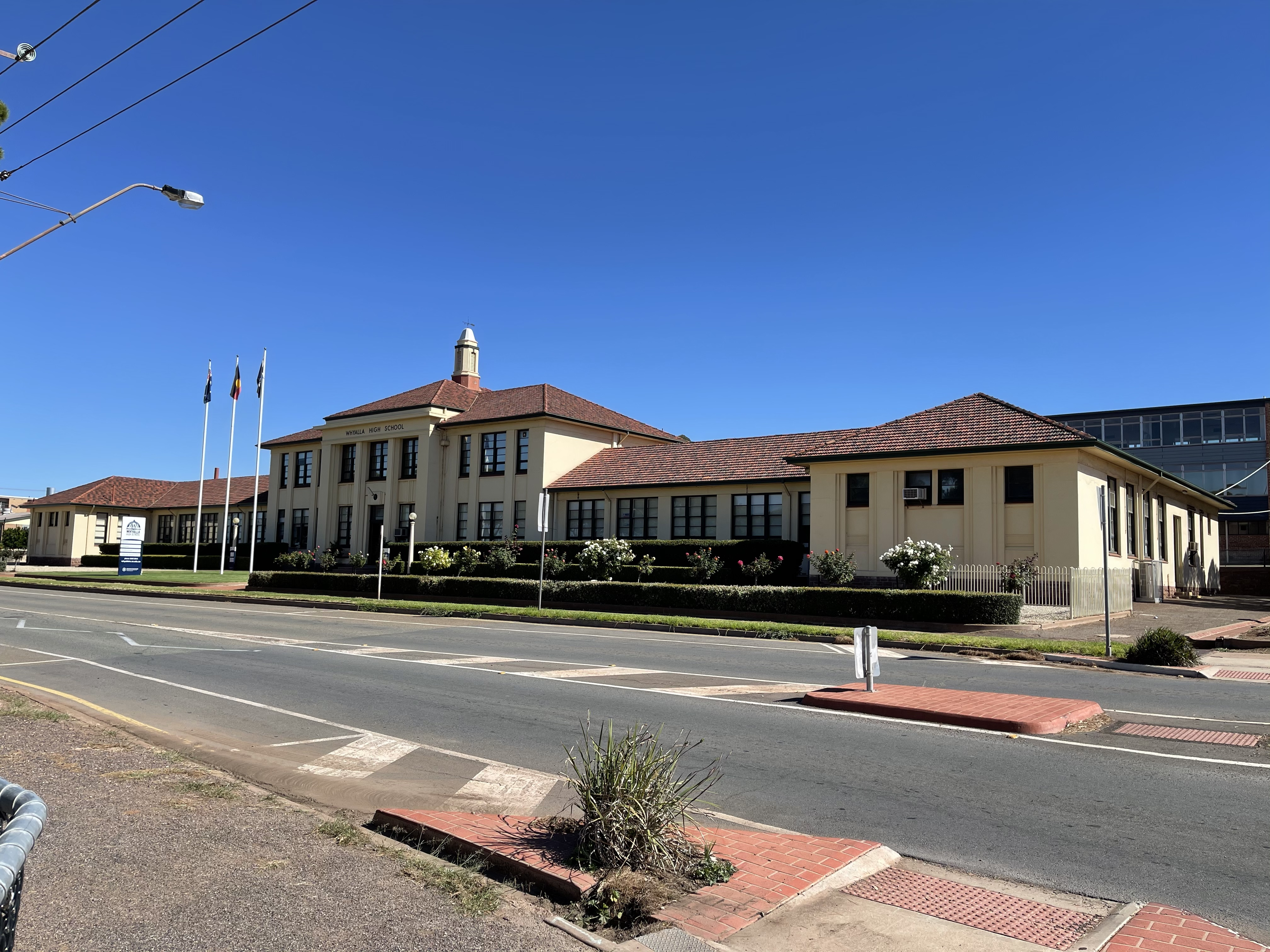
Whyalla High School

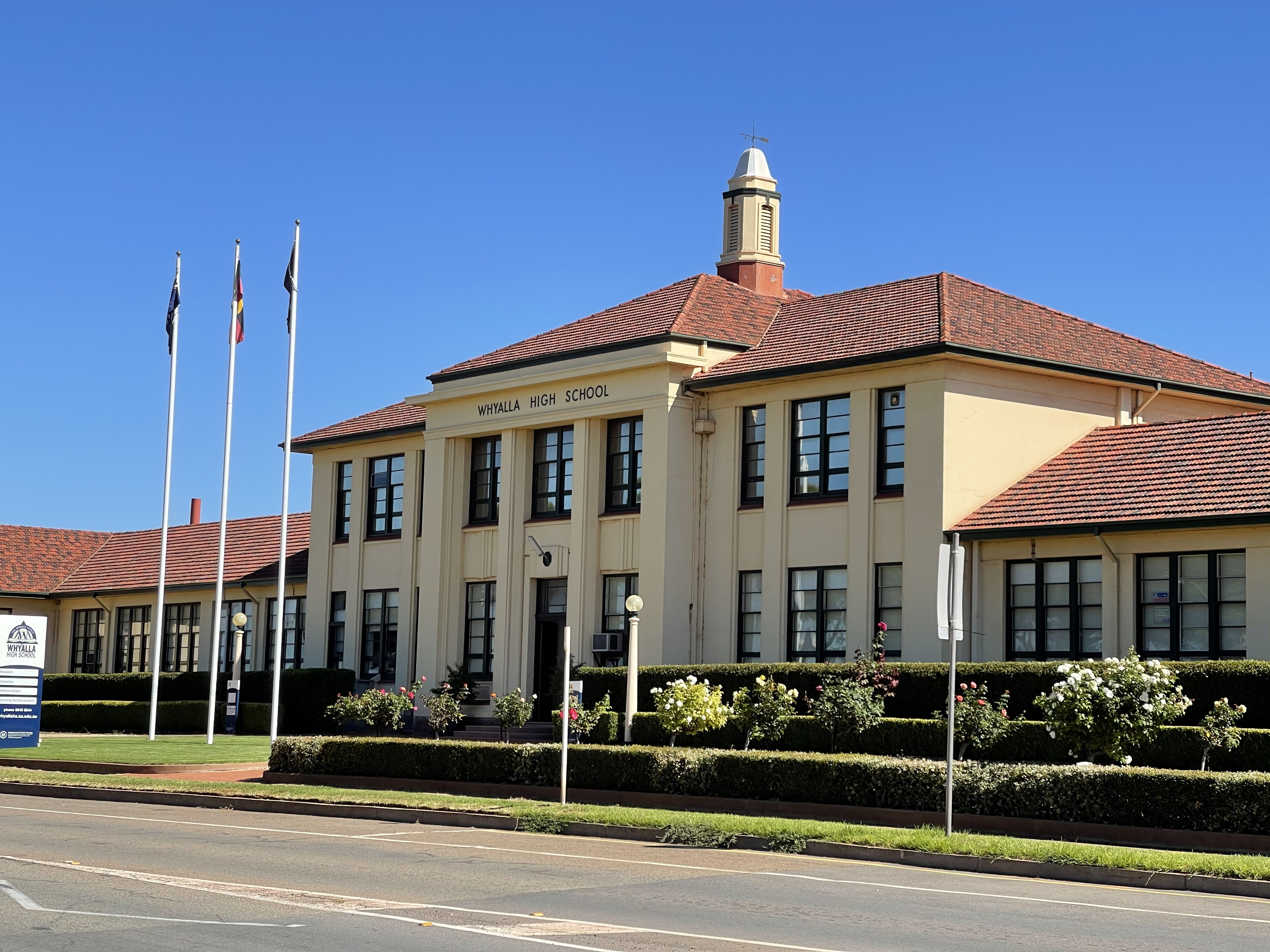
Main Building

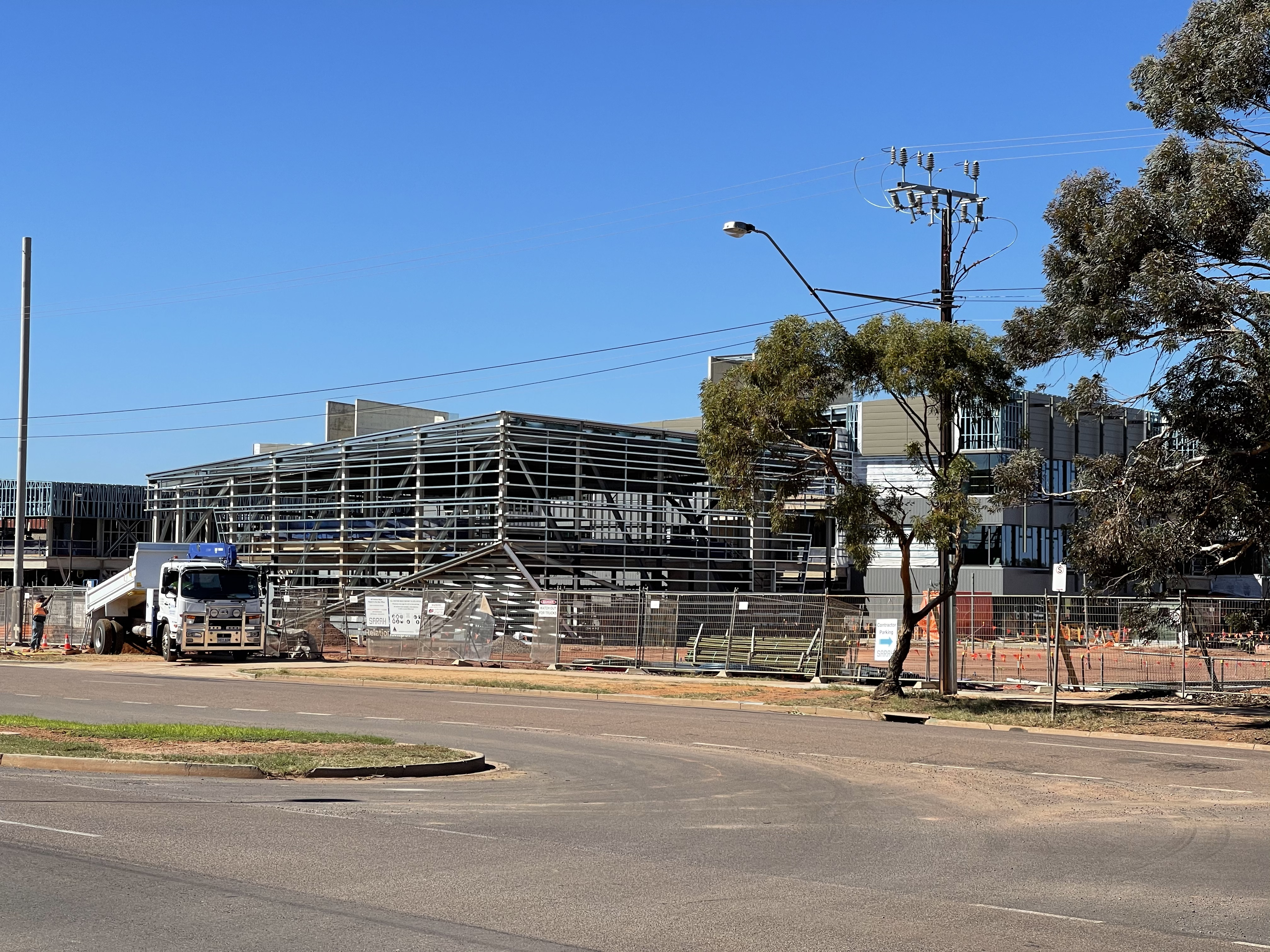
new Whyalla Secondary College under construction
