= Middleback Range, South Australia =

Middleback Range Whyalla, South Australia
- Coordinates: 33.181°S 137.25°E
- Population: 3 (SAL 2021)
- Established: 2013
- Postcode(s): 5600
- Time zone: ACST (UTC+9:30)
  - Summer (DST): ACST (UTC+10:30)
- Location: 35 km (22 mi) south-west of Whyalla; 247.3 km (154 mi) north-west of Adelaide city centre
- LGA(s): City of Whyalla; Pastoral Unincorporated Area
- State electorate(s): Giles
- Federal division(s): Grey
Mean max temp	Mean min temp	Annual rainfall
23.7 °C; 75 °F	11.5 °C; 53 °F	271.3 mm 10.7 in
Suburbs around Middleback Range:
Cooyeroo	Myalo Station; Cultana	Whyalla Jenkins, Whyalla Stuart, Mullaquana
Secret Rocks	Middleback Range	Spencer Gulf
Minbrie	Midgee	Murninnie Beach
- Footnotes: Coordinates; Location; Climate; Adjoining localities & suburbs

Middleback Range is a locality in the Australian state of South Australia located in the north east corner of Eyre Peninsula to the south-west of the city of Whyalla and extending from the coastline of Spencer Gulf in the east to the west side of the southern end of the Middleback Range in the west.

Its boundaries were created on 26 April 2013 while its name, which is ultimately derived from the mountain range of the same name, reflects the use of a "long established local name". Its boundaries were again adjusted in 2014 in association with the creation of the new locality of Cultana.

Middleback Range is located within the federal Division of Grey, the state electoral district of Giles, and with part of its eastern side being within the boundary of local government area of the City of Whyalla and the western side being within the Pastoral Unincorporated Area of South Australia. The Lincoln Highway passes through the locality on its way from the city of Whyalla to the city of Port Lincoln.

== See also ==
- List of cities and towns in South Australia
- Whyalla - Cowleds Landing Aquatic Reserve
