= Whyalla Stuart, South Australia =

Whyalla Stuart
- Suburb
- Interactive map of Whyalla Stuart
- Coordinates: 33.033°S 137.521°E
- Country: Australia
- State: South Australia
- City: Whyalla
- LGA: City of Whyalla
- Location: 6 km (3.7 mi) west of Whyalla
- Established: 2 March 1967

Government
  - State electorate: Giles
  - Federal division: Grey

Population
  - Total: 6,476 (SAL 2021)
- Postcode: 5608
Suburbs around Whyalla Stuart
	Middleback Range
Whyalla Jenkins	Whyalla Stuart	Whyalla Norrie
Middleback Range	Mullaquana

Whyalla Stuart is a suburb of the city of Whyalla in South Australia. It was gazetted in 1967 with the boundaries adjusted in 1977 and 2000. It is bounded on the south side by the Lincoln Highway.

Stuart High School is near the northern edge of Whyalla Stuart, adjacent to the Whyalla Stuart Campus R-7 primary school, which replaced the Whyalla Stuart Primary and Junior Primary schools in 2008. The Catholic Church in the suburb is dedicated to Our Lady, Help of Christians.
