= Sophie Gonzales (writer) =

Australian writer

- Born: Whyalla, South Australia
- Occupations: Author and Psychologist
- Years active: 2018 - Present
- Notable work: The Law of Inertia Only Mostly Devastated Perfect on Paper If This Gets Out Never Ever Getting Back Together The Perfect Guy Doesn't Exist Nobody in Particular This Wild Wanting
- Website: https://www.sophiegonzalesauthor.com/

Sophie Gonzales is an Australian author known for writing young adult queer romantic comedies and fantasy. She grew up in Whyalla, South Australia and lives in Adelaide, Australia. She graduated from the University of Adelaide, and works as a psychologist. Her novel Only Mostly Devastated is a contemporary, queer re-imagining of Grease. Her novel The Law of Inertia, an LGBT mystery novel, was published in 2018 and addressed mental health issues including depression, anxiety and suicide.

== Bibliography ==
- The Law of Inertia (2018, Chicago Review Press)
- Only Mostly Devastated (2020, Wednesday Books and Hodder Children's Books)
- Perfect on Paper (2021, Wednesday Books and Hodder Children's Books)
- If This Gets Out - co-written with Cale Dietrich (2021, Wednesday Books and Hodder Children's Books)
- Never Ever Getting Back Together (2022, Wednesday Books and Hodder Children's Books)
- The Perfect Guy Doesn't Exist (2024, Wednesday Books and Hodder Children's Books)
- Nobody In Particular (2025, Wednesday Books and Hodder Children's Books)
- This Wild Wanting (2026, Wednesday Books and Hodder Children's Books)

== Critical reception ==
Cosmopolitan called Only Mostly Devastated- a queer retelling of the popular film Grease- one of the "17 LGBTQ+ Books Everyone Needs to Read ASAP" in March 2020, and the American Booksellers Association placed it on their Spring 2020 Kids’ Indie Next List. The Junior Library Guild also made it a Gold Standard Selection.

Only Mostly Devastated was a semi-finalist in the Goodreads Choice Awards in the category of Best Young Adult fiction. It was also listed as a finalist in the Southern Independent Booksellers Alliance's Southern Book Prize, and shortlisted for the Waterstones Children's Book Prize for Older Fiction in 2021.

Several of her books have been nominated for the Goodreads Choice Awards within the Young Adult Fiction category, including Only Mostly Devastated, Perfect on Paper, Never Ever Getting Back Together, and Nobody in Particular, which made it to the final round of the 2025 awards, earning 20,022 votes.

== Book Bans ==
Gonzales's books have been the target of several book bans across the United States of America. In 2022, Gonzales shared she had been informed several Texas schools had banned her recent release, Perfect on Paper. In 2023, Mayor of Ozark, Alabama, Mark Blankenship, threatened to defund the public library if a list of LGBTQIA+ children's books were not removed from the shelf, stating "it's time the people stand up and address this liberal mess".
