= Midgee (disambiguation) =

Midgee is a genus of spiders.

Midgee may refer to the following:

== Places ==
- Midgee, Queensland, a locality in the Shire of Fitzroy
- Midgee, South Australia, a locality
