= Whyalla Airport =

Airport in South Australia

- IATA: WYA; ICAO: YWHA

Summary
- Airport type: Public
- Operator: City of Whyalla
- Serves: Whyalla
- Location: Mullaquana
- Elevation AMSL: 41 ft / 12 m
- Coordinates: 33°03′32″S 137°30′52″E

Map
- Location in South Australia

Runways
Direction	Length		Surface
Direction	m	ft	Surface
05/23	1,500	4,921	Asphalt
17/35	1,686	5,531	Asphalt

Statistics (2024/25)
- Passengers: 43,415
- Aircraft movements: 1,522
- Sources: Australian AIP and aerodrome chart, passenger and aircraft movements from the Bureau of Infrastructure & Transport Research Economics

Whyalla Airport (IATA: WYA, ICAO: YWHA) is an airport located 4 nautical miles (7.4 km; 4.6 mi) southwest of Whyalla, South Australia.

== History ==
The City of Whyalla has operated the airport since 1991 when it was handed over by the Government of Australia. By 2009, the main runway's Pavement Classification Number (PCN) had deteriorated to an 8, which stopped all heavy aircraft, such as the Boeing 737 and Airbus A320, from using the airport.

The airport remained open for use by the Department of Defence C-130 Hercules transport aircraft until the late 1990s. The City of Whyalla, aware of the accelerating damage caused by C-130 operations, asked the Federal Government for financial assistance in upgrading the main runway to accommodate unrestricted C-130 operations. The idea was for the airport to accommodate medium-sized commercial jets as well as the Royal Australian Air Force (RAAF) aircraft. The government declined to offer the City of Whyalla financial assistance to upgrade the main runway. In response, Mayor John Smith stopped all C-130 operations in Whyalla, causing the RAAF to use either RAAF Woomera Airfield or RAAF Base Edinburgh to fly in troops and supplies for the nearby Cultana Training Area.

In 2004, Qantas requested permission to land a Boeing 767 at Whyalla Airport as both Adelaide and Melbourne airports were closed due to fog. Council made the runway available should Qantas need it, but only on the understanding that the Boeing may not be able to take off again. The Qantas Boeing 767 made it safely to its intended destination, but the whole incident highlighted the need for Whyalla to upgrade its main runway to safely accommodate such aircraft in the future. In 2008, the main runway remained substandard for anything other than Saab 340 use or lower.

Whyalla Airport found itself in a difficult position in 2009 as the South Australian mining boom got underway. The city would make an ideal fly-in fly-out location for the new mines, but lacks the infrastructure to accommodate commercial jets. The City of Whyalla lacks the funds to initiate an upgrade of the main runway and both the Australian and State governments are reluctant to financially help out, regardless of which political party is in power.

In September 2008, it was announced that the City of Whyalla were investigating spending over $4 million on upgrading the airport to accept Boeing 737 aircraft. The study is to determine if the airport upgrade is economically feasible. The study will also look at funding options. As of February 2012, Council does not have the required $4.5 million for the pavement upgrade, but has some plans to improve the terminal facilities. It is hoped some grants will be made available for the upgrade via both the Australian and State Governments. One source of funding the council is looking at is selling some of the airport land (of which there is plenty surrounding the actual airport itself) to raise the required funds.

In 2009, Council started the process of handing over the day-to-day running of the airport to another company. This company is conducting its feasibility study and an answer was expected by August 2009. However, the airport was still operated by the Corporation of the City of Whyalla in July 2012.

A refurbished terminal was completed in mid 2014, with this upgrade allowing QantasLink to begin services to the airport from April the following year.

Whyalla City Council announced on 30 January 2025 that it had successfully lobbied the state and federal governments for $30 million to upgrade the main runway.

== Airlines and destinations ==
Airlines	Destinations
QantasLink	Adelaide

== Statistics ==
Whyalla Airport was ranked 51st in Australia for the number of revenue passengers served in financial year 2010–2011.

Annual passenger and aircraft statistics for Whyalla
Year	Revenue passengers	Aircraft movements
2001–02	37,214	4,704
2002–03	36,190	4,302
2003–04	44,048	3,973
2004–05	55,076	4,120
2005–06	64,546	4,511
2006–07	76,091	4,879
2007–08	79,425	3,748
2008–09	68,087	2,996
2009–10	62,401	2,730
2010–11	66,539	2,845
2011–12	70,114	2,961
2012–13	71,740	3,054
2013–14	63,229	2,956
2014–15	62,850	3,229
2015–16	66,644	4,015
2016–17	61,322	3,793
2017–18	69,917	3,661
2018–19	77,734	3,943
2019–20	57,320	3,124
2020–21	37,100	1,816
2021–22	46,965	2,282
2022–23	58,763	2,668
2023–24	46,522	1,446
2024–25	43,415	1,522

== Accidents and incidents ==
- On 31 May 2000, a Piper PA-31-350 aircraft, registration VH-MZK, operated by Whyalla Airlines on flight WW904 crashed in the Spencer Gulf en route from Adelaide to Whyalla. The pilot and seven passengers were killed in the accident. The pilot radioed a mayday transmission when approximately 35 NM (65 km; 40 mi) from Whyalla advising air traffic control he intended to ditch the aircraft in the water if he could not make Whyalla Airport. The last reported position was 15 NM (28 km; 17 mi) from the airport. The subsequent investigation conducted by the Australian Transport Safety Bureau found the aircraft had suffered component failures in both of its engines.
