= Midgee, South Australia =

Midgee South Australia
- Coordinates: 33°25′15″S 137°09′16″E
- Population: 21 (SAL 2021)
- Established: 1998
- Postcode(s): 5602
- Time zone: ACST (UTC+9:30)
  - Summer (DST): ACST (UTC+10:30)
- Location: 214 km (133 mi) north-west of Adelaide; 37 km (23 mi) north of Cowell
- LGA(s): District Council of Franklin Harbour
- Region: Eyre Western
- County: Jervois
- State electorate(s): Flinders
- Federal division(s): Grey
Mean max temp	Mean min temp	Annual rainfall
23.7 °C; 75 °F	11.5 °C; 53 °F	267.2 mm 10.5 in
Suburbs around Midgee:
Middleback Range	Middleback Range; Murninnie Beach	Spencer Gulf
Minbrie	Midgee	Spencer Gulf
Minbrie	Mitchellville	Spencer Gulf
- Footnotes: Distances; Coordinates; Climate; Adjoining suburbs

Midgee is a locality in the Australian state of South Australia located on the east coast of Eyre Peninsula about 214 kilometres (133 miles) north-west of the state capital of Adelaide and about 37 kilometres (23 miles) north of the municipal seat of Cowell.

Its boundaries were created in 1998 in respect to the “long established local name.”

Land use in Midgee is divided between primary industry and conservation with the former being represented by “broadacre farming of cereals and livestock” and the latter being represented by the Munyaroo Conservation Park and the zoning of land adjoining the coastline with Spencer Gulf.

Midgee is located within the federal division of Grey, the state electoral district of Flinders and the local government area of the District Council of Franklin Harbour.

== See also ==
- Midgee (disambiguation)
