= Stuart High School (Whyalla) =

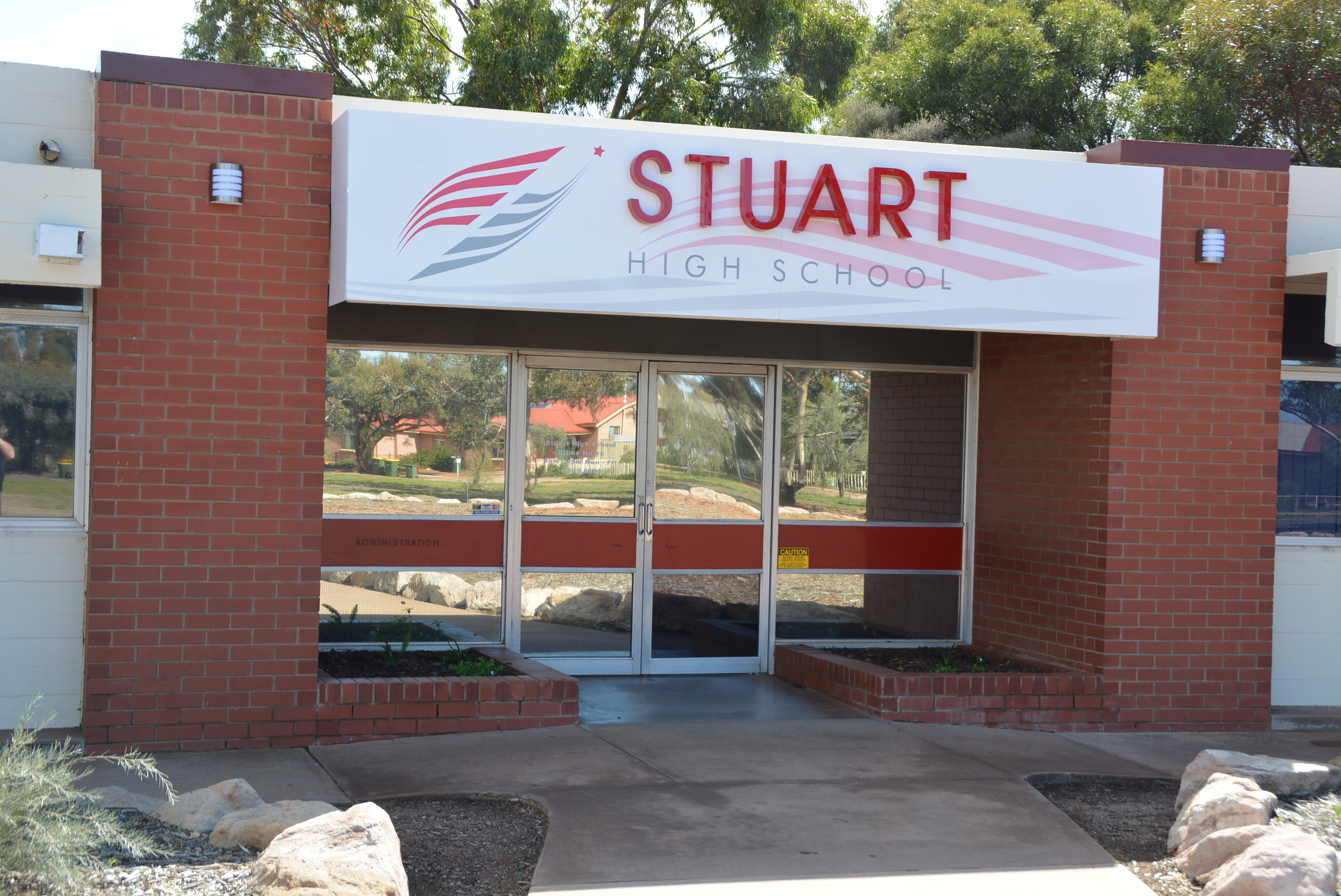

Location
- Whyalla Stuart, South Australia; Australia; 33°00′55″S 137°31′25″E

Information
- School type: Public, secondary school
- Established: 1972
- Principal: Sue Bertenshaw
- Teaching staff: ~12
- Grades: 8–10
- Enrollment: ~140 (2016)
- Colours: Grey, red & white
- Website: www.stuarths.sa.edu.au

Stuart High School was a high school in the city of Whyalla, Australia, on the east coast of the Eyre Peninsula.

Stuart High School was part of an Alliance of schools in Whyalla, including Whyalla High School (8–10) and Edward John Eyre High School (11–12), plus close collaboration with the numerous primary schools in Whyalla.

The school's Aquaculture program is now part of the Eyre Peninsula Seafood and Aquaculture Trial, where tourist can come and visit the complex, and even feed the fish. Stuart High School also participates in the annual "Fishy Fringe" snapper competition, held over Easter in Whyalla, where smoked fish is sold to the public in the school's stall down at the foreshore.

Stuart High School has recently (2016–2017) changed its logo, upgrading the old logo with a more modern interpretation.

Stuart High School is proposed to be merged with Whyalla High School and Edward John Eyre High School. The new merged school is intended to be on Nicolson Avenue, Whyalla Norrie between the Whyalla campuses of the University of South Australia and TAFE SA and is expected to open for the 2022 school year.
