= Bianca Woolford =

Australian para-cyclist

Personal information
- Full name: Bianca Woolford
- Nationality: Australian
- Born: 20 July 1991 (age 34) Whyalla, South Australia

Sport
- Country: Australia
- Sport: Cycling
Medal record
Cycling
UCI Para-cycling Road World Championships
Silver medal – second place	2014 Grenville	Women's Time Trial T1
Silver medal – second place	2014 Grenville	Women's Road Race T1

Bianca Woolford (born 20 July 1991) is an Australian para-cyclist with cerebral palsy. In 2014, she won two silver medals at the UCI Para-cycling Road World Championships.

== Personal ==
Woolford was born 20 July 1991 in Whyalla, South Australia. She has cerebral palsy, which was caused from a seizure due to asphyxiation at birth. Her parents are Tania and Michael. She lives in Port Lincoln, South Australia.

== Sports career ==
At the age of eighteen, she attended an Australian Paralympic Committee Talent Search day in Adelaide, South Australia. Subsequently, she attended a training day the South Australian Sports Institute (SASI) and offered a scholarship. Ben Cook was appointed her coach. Being located in Port Lincoln, she was required to travel to SASI once every two weeks for coaching. In 2013, at the National Para-Cycling Road Championships in Echuca, Victoria, she won a gold medal in the Women's Trial Trial. In 2014, at her first UCI Para-cycling Road World Championship in Greenville, South Carolina, she won silver medals in the Women's Time Trial T1 and Women's Road Race T1.

At the 2015 UCI Para-cycling Road World Championships, Nottwil, Switzerland, she finished fourth in the Women's Time Trial T1 and Women's Road Race T1.

== Recognition ==
- 2014 - South Australian Institute of Sport Female Athlete with a Disability of the Year.
