= Edward John Eyre High School =

School in Whyalla Norrie, South Australia

Coordinates: 33°01′33″S 137°32′28″E

Edward John Eyre High School

Edward John Eyre High School is located in Whyalla Norrie, South Australia. It opened in 1968 as Eyre Technical High School.

Built during the boom period, student enrollment reached around 1,500 in the 1970s. Today, Edward John Eyre High School, also known as Senior Secondary Campus of the Whyalla Secondary College, has a student population of over 400.

Eyre High School caters to a wide cross-section of the community. Its Young Mum's program supports young mothers to complete their education. The Pre-Industry Program and Trade School assists students in preparation in the trade areas. The specialist volleyball course lead to wins in state and national competitions.

Edward John Eyre High is proposed to be merged with Whyalla High School and Stuart High School. The new merged school is intended to be on Nicolson Avenue, Whyalla Norrie between the Whyalla campuses of the University of South Australia and TAFE SA and expected to open for the 2022 school year.

== History ==
=== Eyre High 1968–2008 ===
2008 saw Edward John Eyre High celebrating its 40th birthday. During those 40 years, the school has had two other names, Eyre Technical High School and Eyre High School. For some, the school will always be Eyre High School.

The main buildings of the school were designed by Jim Loveday. They are correctly positioned so as to make the best use of the sun and to reduce the amount of heat gain. This has been positive for those who have used the buildings.

The initial enrolment of 5 classes of Year 8 students were housed at Whyalla High and Memorial Oval Primary School. In 1968 these students moved into the new buildings of Eyre Technical High School on Grundel Street and along with the new Year 8s, brought the enrolment to 711.

The late sixties and early seventies were a period of rapid population growth in Whyalla. By the end of the school's first year, the school population had out-grown the existing main building. To accommodate the increasing enrolment, a new South wing with 8 classrooms and 3 Art rooms was added. These additions were not enough to keep up with population growth. By 1972, the western quadrangle hosted a portable science laboratory and multiple "temporary" classrooms, some of which are still at the school. The school reached its highest enrolment of 1280 students in this period.

In 1971 the school had its first name change and became Eyre High School. The name change was in-line with government policy to remove the distinction between trades orientated Technical High Schools and academically orientated High Schools.

In the early 1980s, the effect of the closure of the shipyard was felt with decreasing population in the city leading to decreasing enrolments. Margaret Grant made the most of this situation, by relocating the library from upstairs in the main building to 6 classrooms, later 7 rooms in the South Wing. This created the space for a well laid out library to serve students and staff.

In 1986 there was a further name change from Eyre High to Edward John Eyre High School. This was done to more closely identify the school with the explorer who it was named after. The longer name also meant that the school was no longer confused with Ayr High School in Queensland.

In 1989 the population of all of Whyalla's schools were trending down in line with the decrease in population of the city. As a result, the Education Department in consultation with School Councils changed the structure of secondary schools to create two junior high schools and a senior high school E.J. Eyre High.

From 1992, the school catered for Year 11, 12 and adult students. It has a wide range of courses which include the Pre-Industry Program and Trade Schools for the Future. It was the first school in the state to have a Young Mums Program.
