= Eddie Hughes (Australian politician) =

Australian politician

Eddie Hughes MP
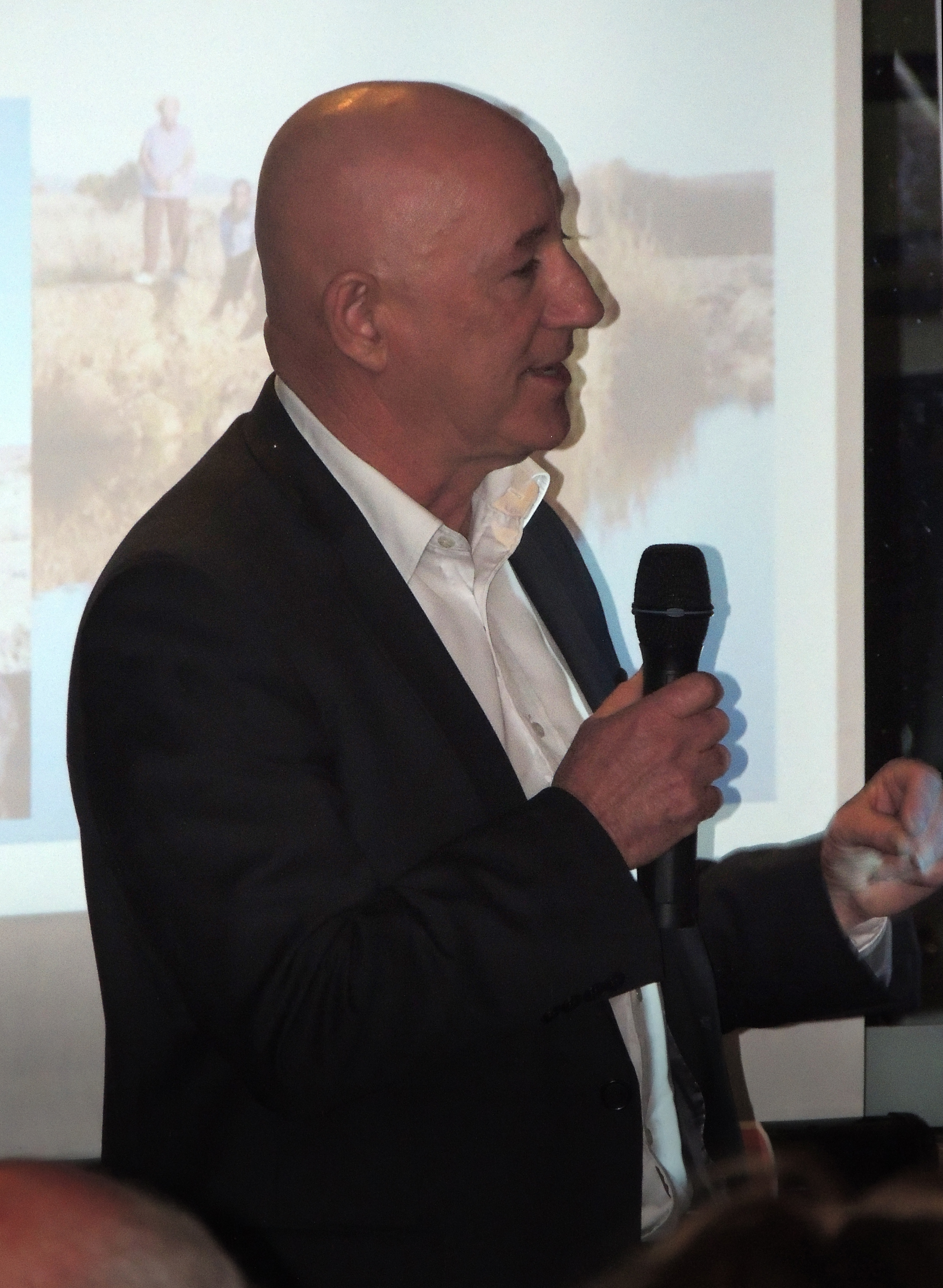
- Hughes in 2016

Member of the South Australian House of Assembly for Giles
- Incumbent
- Assumed office 15 March 2014
- Preceded by: Lyn Breuer

Personal details
- Party: Labor
- Website: www.eddiehughesmp.com

Edward Joseph Hughes is an Australian politician representing the South Australian House of Assembly seat of Giles for the South Australian Labor Party since the 2014 state election. Hughes was previously a long-serving member of the Whyalla City Council. Hughes has expressed strong support for South Australia's development of its renewable energy potential as a Councillor and as a member of Parliament.

South Australian House of Assembly
Preceded by Lyn Breuer	Member for Giles; 2014–present	Incumbent
