= Lyn Breuer =

Australian politician (born 1951)

The Honourable Lyn Breuer OAM
- Nyimbula (Yankunytjatjara)

33rd Speaker of the South Australian House of Assembly
- In office 6 May 2010 – 5 February 2013
- Preceded by: Jack Snelling
- Succeeded by: Michael Atkinson

Member of the House of Assembly for Giles
- In office 11 October 1997 – 15 March 2014
- Preceded by: Frank Blevins
- Succeeded by: Eddie Highes

Mayor of the City of Whyalla
- In office 2016–2018
- Preceded by: Jim Pollock
- Succeeded by: Clare McLaughlin

Councillor of the City of Whyalla
- In office August 1991 – July 1997

Personal details
- Born: Lynette Ruth Raymond; 28 March 1951 (age 75) Whyalla, South Australia
- Party: Labor Party
- Children: 2 (Timothy & Kate)
- Occupation: Public servant, Lecturer

Lynette Ruth Breuer OAM (née Raymond, born 28 March 1951) is a former Australian politician. She represented the electoral district of Giles in the South Australian House of Assembly for the Labor Party from 1997 to 2014. She was the first female Speaker of the South Australian House of Assembly from 2010 to 2013. She is also a former Councillor and Mayor of the City of Whyalla.

== Early life and Family ==
Breuer was born Lynette Ruth Raymond on 28 March 1951 in Whyalla, in South Australia's mid-north. Her father, Keith Raymond and mother, Ruth Stephens, were originally from Kadina, but following their marriage on 24 April 1943 at the Victoria Square Methodist Church, they moved to Whyalla. She has one younger brother, Gary.

Her parents' families were of Cornish mining heritage. Breuer recalls, as a child, sitting at the family dining room table listening to her father, his brothers, Ken and Douglas, and her Grandfather, Ray, regularly talking about politics, particularly Labor Party politics. Bruer credits her father for shaping her political ideology and instilling in her a "great sense of social justice" from a very early age.

In 1971, she married James Breuer; however, the marriage did not last. They had two children, Timothy and Kate. Her son, Tim, is also a former Whyalla City Councillor (2018-2018).

== Early career ==
In 1978, Breuer was appointed as a Clerk for the Commonwealth Employment Service. Later, prior to entering politics, Breuer worked as a Vocational Education and Women's Studies lecturer at the Spencer Institute of TAFE in Whyalla.

== Politics ==
=== Whyalla councillor ===
Between 1991 and 1997, Breuer was elected as a Councillor on the Whyalla City Council, and also held the position of Deputy Mayor in 1994. Breuer is cited as assisting with the establishment of a range of services in the Whyalla community.

=== Member for Giles ===
At the 1997 South Australian state election, Breuer was nominated as the Country Labor Party candidate for the seat of Giles, the state's largest electorate covering over 40,000 km2. Breuer won the 1997 election with 61.4% of the two-party-preferred vote. In addition to winning the seat in 1997, she successfully contested the seat at the 2002, 2006, and 2010 elections.

Breuer retired at the 2014 state election after 16 years in Parliament. She announced her intention to retire in 2013, months after losing her position as Speaker of the South Australian House of Assembly; the media speculated that her retirement was related to losing her position; however, Breuer stated that when she was first elected in 1997, she thought she would "probably do about four terms". She was replaced as the Member for Giles by her long-time staffer and Whyalla City Councillor Eddie Hughes. Breuer was granted the title The Honourable for life following her service as Speaker.

In addition to being a Labor Member of Parliament, she also held the position of Junior Vice President of the Australian Labor Party National Executive for six years and was a member of the State Executive of the South Australian Labor Party State Branch for ten years.

=== First Female Speaker ===
On 6 May 2010, Breuer was appointed as the 33rd Speaker of the House of Assembly and, significantly, the first female to hold the position in Parliament's 174-year history. Breuer held the position until February 2013. As of 2025, she is still the only woman to hold the position of Speaker. Bruer has stated that one of her greatest honours was being appointed as the first female Speaker in the state's history.

=== Mayor of Whyalla ===
At the 2016 Whyalla Supplementary Mayoral election, Breuer ran and was elected as the Mayor of the City of Whyalla with just above 47% of the vote.

In May 2017, Breuer was found guilty of a breach of the council's code of conduct over a "heated argument" with another council member and a third person who had complained. In January 2018, it was announced that Breuer was under investigation for the alleged assault of the wife of SA Best 2018 state election candidate Tom Antonio, at a 2017 Remembrance Day function. However, in December 2018, Prosecutors withdrew the assault charge in the Adelaide Magistrates Court ahead of her scheduled court time.

Breuer ran in the 2018 local government elections, gaining only around 25% of first-preference votes, and being defeated by Clare McLaughlin.

== Honours ==
=== Aboriginal honour ===
On 23 March 2012, at a ceremony held in Coober Pedy, Breuer was made a Yankunytjatjara woman and given the aboriginal name Nyimbula by women elders of the Antakirinja Matu-Yankunytjatjara and Aṉangu Pitjantjatjara Yankunytjatjara peoples.

Breuer has stated that along with being appointed the first female Speaker in SA, being given her aboriginal name and made a Yankunytjatjara woman were her greatest honours.

=== Order of Australia ===
Breuer was presented with the Medal of the Order of Australia (OAM) at the Queen's Birthday 2020 Honours List, for service to the Parliament of South Australia, and to local government.

== See also ==
- Women and government in Australia
- Women in the South Australian House of Assembly

Parliament of South Australia
| Preceded by Frank Blevins | Member for Giles; 1997–2014 | Succeeded by Eddie Hughes |
| Preceded by Jack Snelling | Speaker of the South Australian House of Assembly; 2010–2013 | Succeeded by Michael Atkinson |
