= City of Whyalla =

Coordinates: 33°02′05″S 137°35′08″E

- Local government area
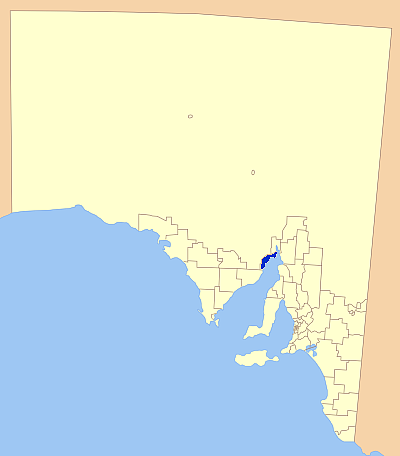
- City of Whyalla LGA indicated in blue

- Interactive map of City of Whyalla
- Country: Australia
- State: South Australia
- Region: Eyre and Western
- Established: 1970
- Council seat: Whyalla

Government
  - Mayor: Phill Stone
  - State electorate: Giles
  - Federal division: Grey

Area
  - Total: 1,032.5 km^{2} (398.7 sq mi)

Population
  - Total: 21,244 (LGA 2021)
- Website: City of Whyalla
LGAs around City of Whyalla
Outback Communities Authority	Outback Communities Authority	City of Port Augusta
Outback Communities Authority	City of Whyalla	District Council of Mount Remarkable
District Council of Franklin Harbour	Spencer Gulf	Spencer Gulf

The City of Whyalla (formally The Corporation of the City of Whyalla) is a local government area in South Australia, located at the north-east corner of the Eyre Peninsula. It was established in 1970, replacing the town commission, which had been running the town previously. The district is mostly industrial, with many large companies having factories in the city.

== Suburbs and localities ==
As of 2015 and following a number of changes to boundaries and locality/suburb names in the years 2010 to 2014, the City of Whyalla consisted of the following suburbs and localities: Backy Point, Cowleds Landing, Douglas Point, Douglas Point South, False Bay, Fitzgerald Bay, Middleback Range (part), Mullaquana, Murninnie Beach, Point Lowly, Point Lowly North, Port Bonython, Whyalla, Whyalla Barson, Whyalla Jenkins, Whyalla Norrie, Whyalla Playford and Whyalla Stuart.

Two parcels of land within the City of Whyalla have been placed outside of the local government area into the unincorporated area of South Australia. These are parts of False Bay and Whyalla Barson both associated with the Whyalla Steelworks and the east end of Mullaquana. These parcels of land are considered by the Government of South Australia to be "strategically important to the state" due to their role in the production cycle of steel.

== Economy ==
The City of Whyalla local government area is based primarily around Whyalla, a town covering 41.5 km^{2}, which holds the vast majority of the district's population. The district's economy is heavily reliant on the Whyalla Steelworks and associated companies located in Whyalla. To lesser extent, Whyalla is also a focal point for the surrounding agricultural areas.

== Council ==
Ward	Councillor	Notes
Mayor	Phill Stone	
Unsubdivided	Tamy Pond	Deputy Mayor
Unsubdivided	Peter Borda	
Unsubdivided	Kathryn Campbell	
Unsubdivided	Mark Inglis	
Unsubdivided	Peter Klobucar	
Unsubdivided	David Knox	
Unsubdivided	Bill Simpson	
Unsubdivided	Sharon Todd	
Unsubdivided	Zia Westerman	

The City of Whyalla has a directly elected mayor.

== Mayors of Whyalla ==
- Keith James Wilson (1970–1973)
- Colin (Murray) Norton (1973-1975)
- Aileen Christina Ekblom (1975-1991)
- Russell Reid (1991–1994)
- Keith James Wilson (1994–1997)
- John Donald Smith (1997–2003)
- Jim Pollock (2003–2016)
- Lyn Breuer (2016–2018)
- Clare McLaughlin (2018–2022)
- Phill Stone (2022-present)

== See also ==
- Whyalla Airport

== Citations and references ==
=== References ===
- "Development Plan, Land Not Within a Council Area Eyre, Far North, Riverland and Whyalla Consolidated – 18 October 2012". Department of Planning, Transport and Infrastructure (DPTI). 2012. Archived from the original on 24 September 2015.
- "Development Plan, Whyalla Council, Consolidated – 19 February 2015". Department of Planning Transport and Infrastructure (DPTI). 2015. Archived from the original on 24 September 2015.
- "Property Location Browser". Department of Planning, Transport and Infrastructure (DPTI). Archived from the original on 12 October 2016.
