= Whyalla Norrie, South Australia =

Whyalla Norrie Whyalla, South Australia
- Coordinates: 33°01′47″S 137°32′22″E
- Population: 6,288 (SAL 2021)
- Established: 2 March 1967
- Postcode(s): 5608
- LGA(s): City of Whyalla
- State electorate(s): Giles
- Federal division(s): Grey
Suburbs around Whyalla Norrie:
Whyalla Barson	Whyalla Barson	Whyalla Barson
Whyalla Stuart	Whyalla Norrie	Whyalla Playford
Mullaquana	Mullaquana	Mullaquana
- Footnotes: Adjoining suburbs/localities

Whyalla Norrie is a suburb of Whyalla on the Eyre Peninsula of South Australia. It was gazetted as a distinct suburb in 1967, and had its boundaries altered in 1975 and 2000. It is bounded by Iron Knob Road, Norrie Avenue, Broadbent Terrace and MacDouall Stuart Avenue. It is part of the City of Whyalla.

It contains the Westland Shopping Centre, the largest shopping centre on the Eyre Peninsula. It also includes the Whyalla Public Library, Bennett Oval, the largest sporting oval in Whyalla, the Whyalla Health and Leisure Centre, and the Anderson Raceway.

Whyalla Norrie has a number of educational facilities: Fisk Street Primary School, Hincks Avenue Primary School, Long Street Primary School, Nicolson Avenue Primary School (opened 1954), Edward John Eyre High School (opened 1968 as the Whyalla Technical School), Sunrise Christian School, the Whyalla Special Education Center, the Whyalla TAFE campus and the Whyalla campus of the University of South Australia.

The suburb includes the National Trust of Australia-owned Mount Laura Homestead Museum heritage village, consisting of the former Mount Laura Station homestead, the Gay Street Cottage and Wash House, the Whyalla Policemen's Dwelling Lockup, engine sheds, a blacksmith shop, harness shed, telecommunications museum, and a former steam train from the Iron Knob mines. The cottage and police lockup are both separately listed on the South Australian Heritage Register; both buildings were relocated to the site in 1978.

Whyalla Norrie was in the top five country localities in South Australia for real estate price growth in the decade to 2013.

Whyalla Norrie has its own branches of the Rotary Club and Country Women's Association.
