= Whyalla =

City in South Australia

- City
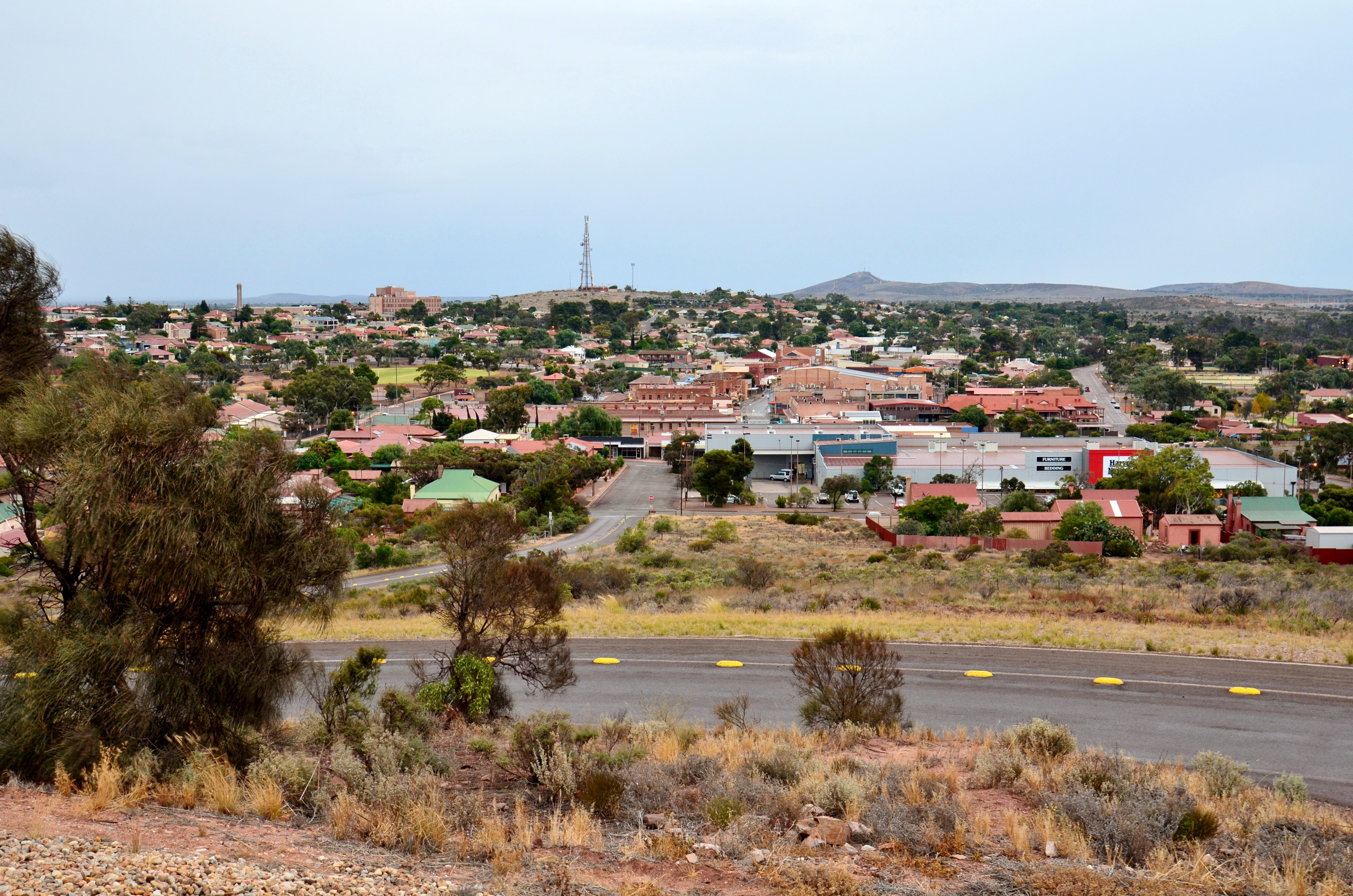
- View of the city from Hummock Hill

- Coordinates: 33°02′0″S 137°34′0″E
- Country: Australia
- State: South Australia
- LGA: City of Whyalla
- Location: 395 km (245 mi) from Adelaide
- Established: 1920

Government
  - State electorate: Giles
  - Federal division: Grey

Population
  - Total: 20,880 (UCL 2021)
- Time zone: UTC+9:30 (ACST)
  - Summer (DST): UTC+10:30 (ACDT)
- Postcode: 5600
- Mean max temp: 23.7 °C (74.7 °F)
- Mean min temp: 11.5 °C (52.7 °F)
- Annual rainfall: 263.4 mm (10.37 in)

Whyalla (/waɪˈælə/) is a city in South Australia. It was founded as Hummock's Hill, and was known by that name until 1916. It is the fourth most populous city in the Australian state of South Australia after Adelaide, Mount Gambier, and Gawler, and along with Port Pirie and Port Augusta is one of the three towns to make up the "Iron Triangle". It is a seaport located on the east coast of the Eyre Peninsula and is known as the "Steel City" due to its integrated steelworks and shipbuilding heritage. The Whyalla Steelworks is the major employer in the town, and has in February 2025 been put into voluntary administration by the Government of South Australia. The port of Whyalla has been exporting iron ore since 1903.

== Description ==
The city consists of an urban area bounded to the north by the railway to the mining town of Iron Knob, to the east by Spencer Gulf, and to the south by the Lincoln Highway. The urban area consists of the following suburbs laid from east to west extending from a natural hill known as Hummock Hill: Whyalla, Whyalla Playford, Whyalla Norrie, Whyalla Stuart, and Whyalla Jenkins. A port facility, a rail yard serving the railway line to Iron Knob, and an industrial complex are located to the immediate north of Hummock Hill. Whyalla Barson and the Whyalla Conservation Park are located about 10 kilometres (6.2 mi) north of the city. It is an iron-rich exporting town that supplies the country of China.

== Nomenclature ==
The origin of the name Whyalla is disputed. In 1916 it was referred to as the "native" name, having been ascribed during a survey conducted a few years beforehand. During the 1940s, Norman Tindale, the ethnologist at the South Australian Museum believed that the name could have been derived from Aboriginal words "Wajala", meaning "west" in a language common to Port Pirie, or "Waiala", meaning "I don't know" in a language more common to Port Augusta. In 1945, BHP advised that the name had been taken from nearby Mount Whyalla, which lies northwest of Whyalla, roughly midway between the town and Iron Knob. Other meanings ascribed to the word Whyalla include "dingo", "by the water", and "a place of water". Another hypothesis is that the name was brought by European settlers and was derived from a place called Whyalla in Durham, England.

== History ==
=== Early history ===
Whyalla is part of the Barngarla Aboriginal country.

A mariner named William Morgan Burgoyne purportedly recommended the site for the establishment of a port on False Bay to Harry Morgan of BHP. Burgoyne had spent several weeks there on a trip out from Port Augusta hunting kangaroo with his brother and another man called Alf Rowarth. At that time there was no settlement between Middleback Station and the Point Lowly Lighthouse, and kangaroos were plentiful there.

Burgoyne recalled that the tug Florrie ferried a crew there a week later and pegged out the settlement first known as Hummocky.

=== 20th century ===
Whyalla was founded as "Hummock's Hill", and was known by that name until 1916. It was officially founded as Hummock's Hill in 1901 by the BHP Whyalla Tramway, which transported iron ore from Iron Knob in the Middleback Range to the sea. Its first shipment was transported across Spencer Gulf to Port Pirie, where it was used in lead smelters as a flux. A jetty was built to transfer the ore and the first shipment was sent in 1903. The early settlement consisted of small cottages and tents clustered around the base of the hill. The post office opened in 1901 as Hummock's Hill.

In 1905 the town's first school opened. It was originally called Hummock Hill School but was subsequently renamed to Whyalla Primary School and Whyalla Higher Primary School. The school's current name is Whyalla Town Primary School.

The arid environment and lack of natural fresh water resources made it necessary to import water in barges from Port Pirie.

The Post Office was renamed Whyalla on 1 November 1919, and on 16 April 1920 the town was officially proclaimed with its new name. The ore conveyor on the jetty was improved, and the shipping of ore to the newly built Newcastle Steelworks commenced. The town grew slowly prior to the development of steelmaking and shipbuilding facilities in the late 1930s.

BHP shipbuilding and freight wharves, Whyalla, South Australia, c. 1950

The BHP Indenture Act was proclaimed in 1937 and provided the impetus for the construction of a blast furnace and harbour. In 1939 the blast furnace and harbour began to be constructed and a commitment for a water supply pipeline from the Murray River was made. A shipyard was built to provide ships for the Royal Australian Navy during World War II. The population began to rise rapidly and many new facilities, including a hospital and abattoirs, were built.

In 1941 the first ship from the new shipyard, HMAS Whyalla, was launched and the blast furnace became operational. By 1943 the population was more than 5,000. On 31 March 1943, the Morgan - Whyalla pipeline became operational. In 1945 the city came under combined company and public administration and the shipyard began producing commercial ships. In 1948, displaced persons began arriving from Europe increasing the cultural diversity of Whyalla.

In 1958 BHP decided to build an integrated steelworks at Whyalla and it was completed in 1965. In the following year, salt harvesting began and coke ovens were built. The population grew extremely rapidly, and the South Australian Housing Trust was building 500 houses each year to cope with the demand. Plans for a city of 100,000 were produced by the Department of Lands. A second water supply pipeline from Morgan was built to cope with the demand.

In 1970 the city adopted full local government status. Fierce competition from Japanese ship builders resulted in the closing of the shipyards in 1978, which were at the time the largest in Australia. From a peak population of 38,130 in 1976, the population dropped rapidly. A decline in the BHP iron and steel industry since 1981 also impacted employment.

=== 21st century ===
The BHP long products division was divested in 2000 to form OneSteel, which is the sole producer of rail and steel sleepers in Australia. On 2 July 2012, OneSteel changed its name to Arrium. After going into administration in 2016 Arrium was purchased by UK entity GFG Alliance with the steelworks placed under Liberty Steel Group and called Liberty Primary Steel and Mining.

From 2004 onward, northern South Australia enjoyed a sudden mineral exploration boom, and Whyalla found itself well placed to benefit from new ventures, being situated on the edge of the Gawler craton. The city experienced an economic upturn with the population slowly increasing and the unemployment rate falling to a more typical level.

=== Heritage listings ===
Whyalla has a number of heritage-listed sites, including:

- Broadbent Terrace: Whyalla High School
- 13 Forsyth Street: Hotel Bay View, Whyalla
- 5 Forsyth Street: Spencer Hotel, Whyalla
- Gay Street: World War Two Gun Emplacements, Hummock Hill
- 3 Whitehead Street: Whyalla Court House

== Port ==
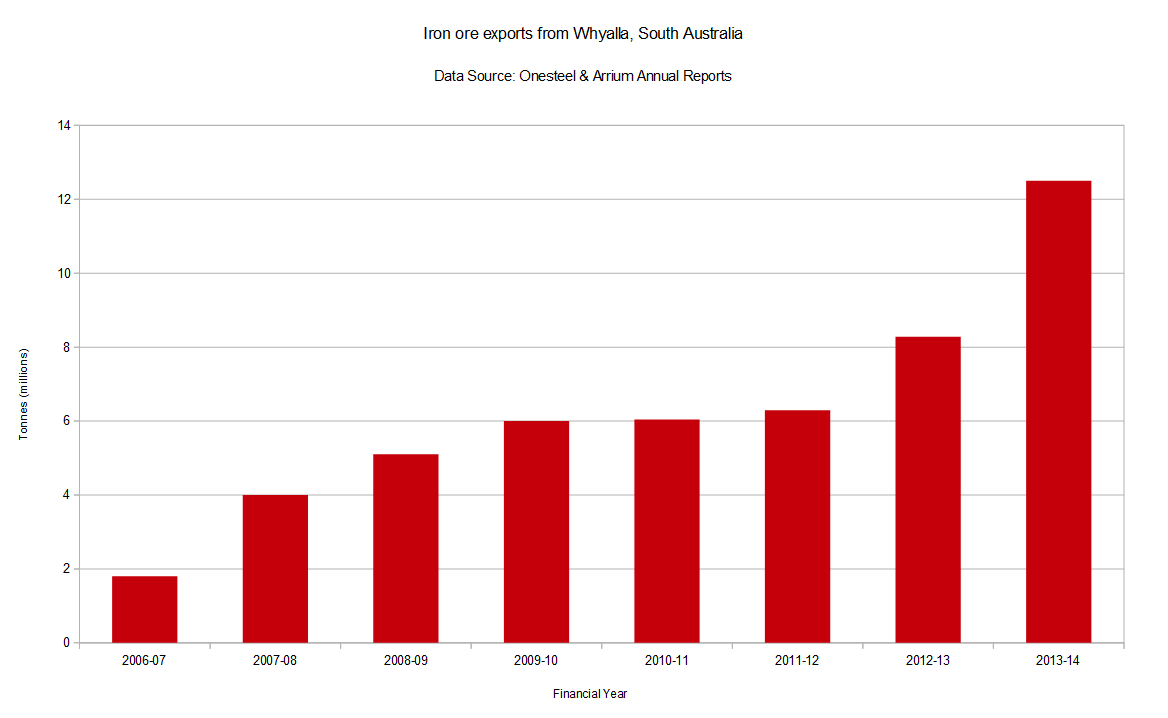
Iron ore exports from Whyalla, South Australia (2007–2014)

Since its beginnings as Hummock Hill, the town has served as a port for the shipment of iron ore from deposits along the Middleback Range.

The port's first conveyor-belt loading system was installed in 1915 and was capable of loading 1,000 tonnes of ore per hour. In 1943, it took 5½-to-6 hours to load a single 5,000-ton freighter.

In 2007, new transshipment handling processes were implemented, which allowed Arrium (formerly Onesteel) to load iron ore onto larger capesize bulk carrier vessels in deeper water. The transshipment process involves filling barges with ore that is then transferred into the receiving vessels at one of three transshipment anchorages.

In the financial year 2014–15, 12.5 million tonnes of haematite ore was exported from Whyalla using the transshipment process.

In October 2015 Arrium loaded its largest capesize cargo via transshipment. The FPMCB Nature was loaded with approximately 205,698 wet metric tonnes (wmt) of iron ore – significantly more than the average load of about 170,000 wmt.

The port's inner harbour receives shipments of coal that is used to produce coke for the Whyalla steelworks and exports smaller cargoes of finished steel products.

== Economy and energy ==
=== Whyalla Steelworks ===
Much of the town's economy is centred around the Whyalla Steelworks.

After changes of ownership from BHP to its spin-off Arrium, which went into voluntary administration in 2017, the steelworks were bought by Liberty Steel Group, a subsidiary of the British-based international company GFG Alliance. On 20 February 2025, the federal government under Anthony Albanese announced a $2.4 billion joint state-federal support package for Whyalla and its steelworks, after GFG had got into financial difficulties and own tens of millions of dollars to its suppliers.

=== Energy ===
Santos has supplied gas to the steelworks for several years, and in February 2024 signed an MoU with GFG Alliance to start discussions to reduce emissions from the steelworks.

The Whyalla Hydrogen Facility (WHF, aka Hydrogen Jobs Plan) was a proposed 250MWe hydrogen electrolyser (producing green hydrogen), a 200MW combined cycle gas turbine generator, and 3600-tonne hydrogen storage facility. A South Australian Government company called Hydrogen Power South Australia was established to own and operate the plant, which is expected to be completed in 2025 and begin operations in 2026. ATCO Australia, BOC, and Epic Energy would deliver the plan, in which the government has invested A$593 million. In February 2024, the government signed an agreement with GFG Alliance reaching "to explore opportunities for hydrogen offtake" from the WHF. It would supply power to the steelworks to produce green steel. The project was cancelled in 2025.

== Geography ==
=== Climate ===
Whyalla has a semi-arid climate (Köppen: BSk/BSh), with hot summers and mild winters. Temperatures vary throughout the year, with average maxima ranging from 30.2 °C (86.4 °F) in January to 17.1 °C (62.8 °F) in July, and average minima fluctuating between 17.9 °C (64.2 °F) in January and 5.3 °C (41.5 °F) in July. Annual precipitation is low, averaging 269.4 mm (10.61 in) between 77.9 precipitation days. The town has 62.7 clear days and 46.6 cloudy days annually. Extreme temperatures have ranged from 48.5 °C (119.3 °F) on 24 January 2019 to −3.2 °C (26.2 °F) on 12 June 1984 and 16 July 1982.

Climate data for Whyalla (33º03'00"S, 137º31'12"E, 9 m AMSL) (1945–2024 normals and extremes)
Month	Jan	Feb	Mar	Apr	May	Jun	Jul	Aug	Sep	Oct	Nov	Dec	Year
Record high °C (°F)	48.5 (119.3)	48.0 (118.4)	44.1 (111.4)	40.4 (104.7)	32.9 (91.2)	26.3 (79.3)	27.0 (80.6)	32.1 (89.8)	38.0 (100.4)	42.1 (107.8)	45.5 (113.9)	46.8 (116.2)	48.5 (119.3)
Mean daily maximum °C (°F)	30.2 (86.4)	29.6 (85.3)	27.4 (81.3)	24.0 (75.2)	20.5 (68.9)	17.2 (63.0)	17.1 (62.8)	18.5 (65.3)	21.7 (71.1)	24.1 (75.4)	26.5 (79.7)	28.3 (82.9)	23.8 (74.8)
Daily mean °C (°F)	24.1 (75.4)	23.7 (74.7)	21.6 (70.9)	18.0 (64.4)	14.6 (58.3)	11.7 (53.1)	11.2 (52.2)	12.3 (54.1)	15.0 (59.0)	17.5 (63.5)	20.3 (68.5)	22.2 (72.0)	17.7 (63.8)
Mean daily minimum °C (°F)	17.9 (64.2)	17.8 (64.0)	15.7 (60.3)	11.9 (53.4)	8.7 (47.7)	6.1 (43.0)	5.3 (41.5)	6.0 (42.8)	8.2 (46.8)	10.8 (51.4)	14.0 (57.2)	16.0 (60.8)	11.5 (52.8)
Record low °C (°F)	5.9 (42.6)	7.8 (46.0)	5.5 (41.9)	2.2 (36.0)	−0.4 (31.3)	−3.2 (26.2)	−3.2 (26.2)	−2.0 (28.4)	0.0 (32.0)	0.3 (32.5)	4.4 (39.9)	4.7 (40.5)	−3.2 (26.2)
Average precipitation mm (inches)	20.6 (0.81)	21.9 (0.86)	17.1 (0.67)	21.0 (0.83)	22.4 (0.88)	27.3 (1.07)	21.3 (0.84)	21.4 (0.84)	25.4 (1.00)	22.9 (0.90)	23.6 (0.93)	24.7 (0.97)	269.4 (10.61)
Average precipitation days (≥ 0.2 mm)	3.4	3.0	3.8	4.9	8.2	10.7	10.0	9.7	7.4	6.6	5.2	5.0	77.9
Average afternoon relative humidity (%)	38	40	40	44	49	54	53	48	44	41	39	41	44
Average dew point °C (°F)	10.3 (50.5)	11.3 (52.3)	9.4 (48.9)	8.4 (47.1)	7.6 (45.7)	6.2 (43.2)	5.3 (41.5)	4.7 (40.5)	4.8 (40.6)	5.2 (41.4)	7.3 (45.1)	9.5 (49.1)	7.5 (45.5)
Source: Bureau of Meteorology (1945–2024 normals and extremes)

== Demographics ==
In the 2021 Australian census, the population of Whyalla was 20,880.

=== Past ===
As of June 2018, Whyalla had an urban population of 21,742, having declined at an average annual rate of –0.75% year-over-year over the preceding five years.

According to the 2016 census of Population, there were 21,751 people in Whyalla, comprising:

- Aboriginal and Torres Strait Islander people made up 4.7% of the population.
- 73.8% of people were born in Australia. The nextmost common countries of birth were England 7.2%, Scotland 2.4%, Philippines 1.4%, South Africa 0.8% and Germany 0.7%.
- 87.0% of people spoke only English at home. Other languages spoken at home included Afrikaans 0.7%, Tagalog 0.6%, Greek 0.5%, Italian 0.5% and Filipino 0.5%.
- The most common responses for religion were No Religion 38.7%, Catholic 19.5%, Anglican 10.5%.
- Of the employed people in Whyalla, 12.4% worked in Iron Smelting and Steel Manufacturing. Other major industries of employment included Iron Ore Mining 7.3%, Hospitals 4.2%, Supermarket and Grocery Stores 3.8% and Primary Education 3.4%.
- There were 9,452 people who reported being in the labour force in the week before Census night. Of these 52.5% were employed full-time, 29.5% were employed part-time and 12.5% were unemployed.
- The median weekly household income is $989.

== Transport ==
=== Road ===
The Lincoln Highway passes directly through Whyalla. The city is served by a coach bus service operated by Stateliner which operates four services to and from Adelaide (via Port Augusta) each week day (less on weekends) and one service each way to Port Lincoln. There are however occasional exceptions to the week day route due to lack of demand to travel through Whyalla.

=== Rail ===
The BHP Whyalla Tramway was built to Iron Knob to supply iron ore originally used as flux when smelting copper ore. This ore became the basis of the steelworks. As the Iron Knob deposits were worked out, the railway was diverted to other sources of ore at Iron Monarch, Iron Prince, Iron Duke and Iron Baron.

To enable interchange between the BHP's other steelworks in Newcastle and Port Kembla of specialised rollingstock, the railway system within the Whyalla steelworks was converted to standard gauge in the 1960s.

Although the steelworks produced railway rail, for several decades there was no railway connection to the mainland system. Finally in 1972, the standard gauge Whyalla line to Port Augusta was completed and Whyalla railway station opened. The station was served daily from Adelaide until 1975, then again from 1986 to 1990 by the Iron Triangle Limited. The station was demolished in 2012.

Some iron ore is exported from Whyalla. In 2007, steps were being taken to export iron ore mined at Peculiar Knob near Coober Pedy, 600 km away. To meet this increased demand, a balloon loop was installed in 2012 at the port for both gauges.

=== Air ===
Whyalla Airport is 4 nautical miles (7.4 km; 4.6 mi) southwest of the city. It was served by Rex Airlines flying into Whyalla from Adelaide it served the airport several times a day however due to passenger security screening charges Rex Airlines ceased flying into Whyalla on 1 July 2023, and QantasLink which operates twice daily services from Adelaide.

=== Sea ===
There is a small boat marina (populated by a number of dolphins), a sailing club, and a boat ramp on the coastline below Hummock Hill, where there is a fish-cleaning station situated nearby. Iron ore is exported through an off-shore facility.

== Media ==
Whyalla is served by several radio and TV stations. Radio stations include 5YYY FM (Local community station), Magic FM (Commercial station based in Port Augusta), and 5AU/5CS (Commercial station based in Port Pirie). The local TV stations are Seven, Nine, and Network 10.

The local newspaper, The Whyalla News, was first published on 5 April 1940, and is currently owned by Australian Community Media. Historically, another short-lived monthly newspaper called the Whyalla Times (January – October 1960) was also printed for the town by E.J. McAllister and Co., from its premises in Blythe Street, Adelaide. Another publication called Scope (May 1973 – November 1982) was also printed in the town. According to the State Library, "Scope was a monthly regional magazine in newspaper format published by the Willson family of the Whyalla News. It was issued as an insert to six local newspapers: the Recorder (Port Pirie), Transcontinental (Port Augusta), Eyre Peninsula Tribune (Cleve), Port Lincoln Times, West Coast Sentinel (Streaky Bay) and Northern Argus (Clare)."

== Tourism ==
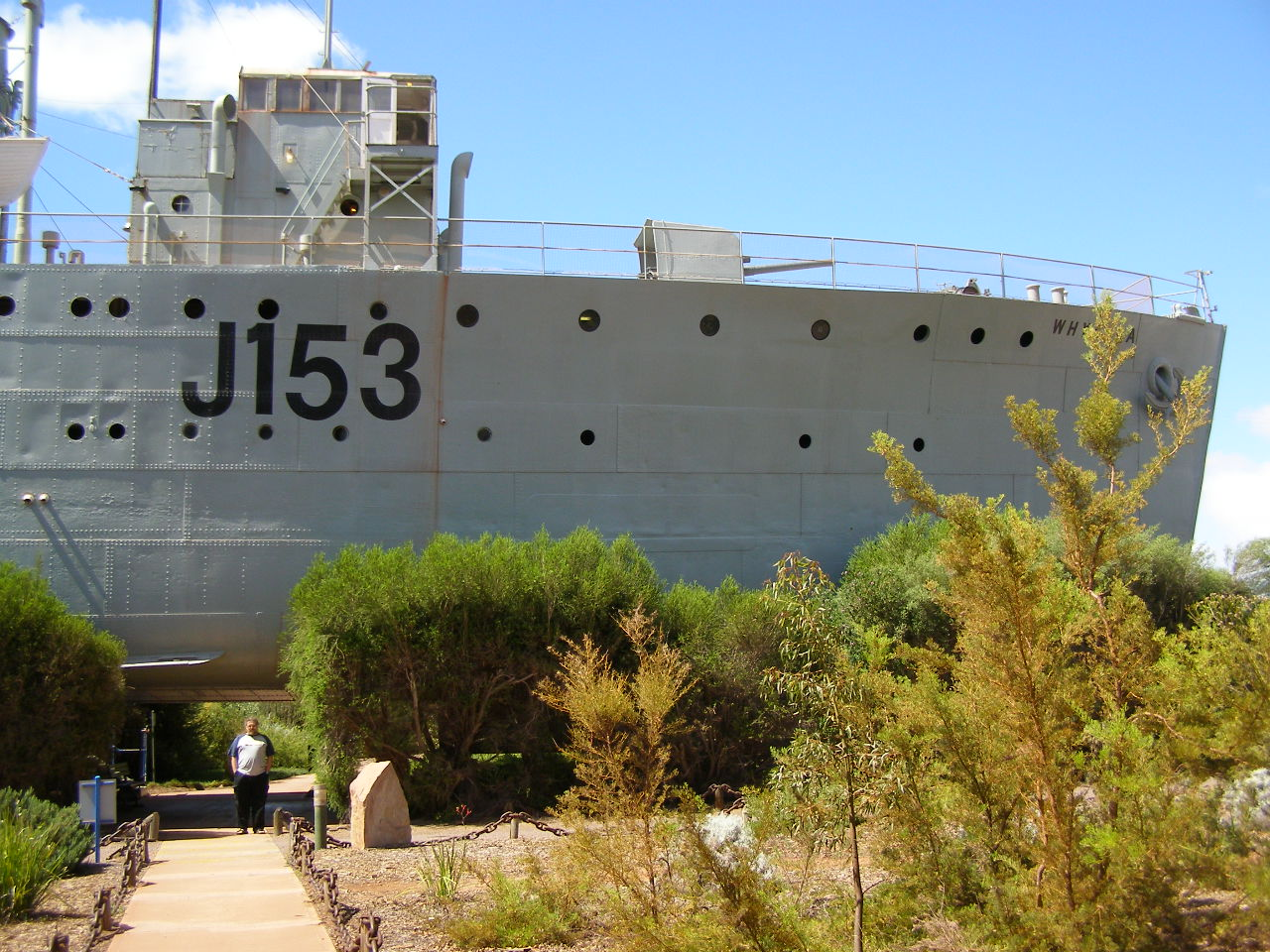
HMAS Whyalla, a locally built World War II-era corvette

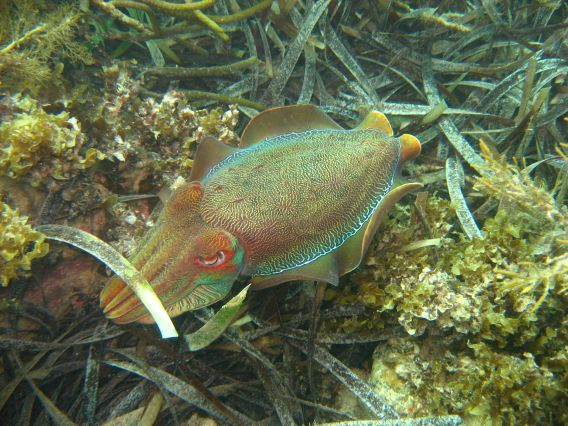
Giant Australian cuttlefish

The industrial and cultural history of Whyalla is accessible to tourists via several museums and public tours.

Visitors can view the ex-HMAS Whyalla from the Lincoln Highway and take a guided tour of it via the Whyalla Maritime Museum. The ship is a retired World War II-era corvette and was the first ship built in the city of Whyalla during the war. It was relocated to the highway in 1987. The Whyalla Maritime Museum features various displays commemorating the town's ship building and mining history, including miniature replicas of various ships and a model railway diorama. Further displays introduce visitors to the region's natural and indigenous cultural histories.

Tours of the Whyalla Steelworks allow visitors to view the production of long products at the working plant. Tours depart from the Whyalla Visitors Centre.

The town's development and social history is presented at the volunteer-run Mount Laura Homestead National Trust Museum, which is located near the Westlands shopping centre.

One of the main tourist attractions of Whyalla is the world-renowned beach, and the many attractions based around it. Especially the shops and pop-ups in the car park.

=== Ecotourism ===
In the late 1990s the annual migration of the Australian giant cuttlefish Sepia apama to shallow, inshore rocky reef areas in Spencer Gulf north of Whyalla became recognised by divers and marine scientists. Divers and snorkellers can see the aggregation of animals from May through August each year, in water one to six metres deep. The most popular places to view the aggregation are Black Point, Stony Point and Point Lowly. Car parking and boardwalks or stairs to the waters edge are present at each location, making access easy. Diving and snorkelling equipment including wetsuits can be hired in Whyalla, with guided in-water experiences available. Tourists can also view the animals from glass-bottom boats which depart from Whyalla and from Port Bonython while the aggregation is in season.

Dolphins frequent the Whyalla marina, but concerns have been raised that their confidence around humans may increase their vulnerability.

The Whyalla Conservation Park provides an example of the natural semi-arid environment accessible via walking trails. A gentle climb to the top of Wild Dog Hill provides a view of the surrounding landscape and information on native vegetation via a series of interpretive signs.

=== Fishing ===
Boat launching facilities exist at Whyalla and Point Lowly North marinas. The Whyalla Marina also has a jetty which is illuminated at night for the convenience of fishers.

Whyalla was home to an annual Snapper Fishing Competition. The largest of its kind and renowned for attracting tourists and fisherman from all over Australia, if not the world. However, due to major over fishing, a blanket ban was put in place to help population growth until 30 June 2026. Subsequently, the annual fishing competition was closed.

== Politics ==
=== State and federal ===
2006 state election
Labor	66.3%
Liberal	21.8%
Family First	6.5%
Greens	4.0%
Independent	1.4%

2007 federal election
Labor	57.07%
Liberal	29.50%
Greens	5.19%
Family First	4.59%
National	1.60%
Democrats	1.16%
Independent	0.88%

Whyalla is part of the state electoral district of Giles, which is presently held by Labor MP Eddie Hughes. Giles was previously held by Labor MP Lyn Breuer from 1997 until her retirement in 2014. In federal politics, the city is part of the division of Grey, and has been represented by Liberal MP Rowan Ramsey since 2007. Grey is held with a margin of 8.86% and is considered safe-liberal. The results shown are from the largest polling station in Whyalla Norrie – which is located at Nicolson Avenue Primary School.

=== Local ===
Whyalla is in the City of Whyalla local government area along with Point lowly and some sparsely inhabited areas around it.

== Education ==
=== Primary schools ===
Primary schools in Whyalla include Whyalla Town Primary School, Fisk Street Primary School, Long Street Primary School, Hincks Avenue Primary School, Memorial Oval Primary School, Whyalla Stuart Campus, Nicolson Avenue Primary School, Sunrise Christian School, St Teresa's and Our Lady Help of Christians (both Samaritan College).

=== Secondary schools ===
Until 2021 Secondary Education was provided by Whyalla High School, Stuart High School, Samaritan College, Edward John Eyre High School and Saint John's College, Whyalla. Saint John's College is one of the three schools that make up Samaritan College.

On 1 November 2017 a new high school was announced by Department for Education & Child Development for Whyalla which would combine Edward John Eyre, Stuart High and Whyalla High Schools into a new purpose built facility located between the University of South Australia and TAFE SA campuses.

In 2022 Whyalla Secondary College opened, with capacity for 1500 students and amalgamating Edward John Eyre High, Whyalla High and Stuart High. The building firm who undertook the construction won an Australian Institute of Building award for construction.

=== Tertiary education ===
Tertiary education is provided by the Spencer Institute of TAFE, and the Whyalla Campus of the University of South Australia. UniSA Whyalla's academic programs include business, social work, nursing and research opportunities in rural health and community development.

=== Arts ===
The D'Faces of Youth Arts community youth arts organisation has run workshops and activities for young people aged 7 to 27 in theatre, dance, visual arts and music since 1994.

The Whyalla Recording Scholarship is awarded annually for Whyalla residents aged from 12 to 21. The Inaugural (2017) Winner was seventeen year old Breeze Millard from Whyalla. The Second (2018) Whyalla Recording Scholarship was launched on 23 April 2018 with 2 Winners (17 year old Liberty Tuohy from Port Neill and 19 year old Shakira Fauser from Whyalla) and 1 Runner-Up (15 year old Jaylee Daniels from Whyalla) being announced on 17 September 2018. On 24 February 2019 Jaylee Daniels' Debut Single "Papa's Song" reached Number 7, and Shakira Lea's "I Miss You" Number 18 on the iTunes Australia Country Chart In 2021 both Jaylee (with "Tonight") and Shakira (with "Drowning") released their second Singles. On 21 February 2021 Jaylee Daniels' "Tonight" reached Number 3 on the iTunes Australia Singer Songwriter Chart.

== Sport ==
The Whyalla Football League is an Australian rules football competition supporting half-a-dozen clubs. In 1998, Bennett Oval hosted a National Rugby League match between the Adelaide Rams and Illawarra Steelers. The Steelers won 39–4.

But Whyalla also has sports for Basketball, Hockey, Soccer & Boxing. Out of the 4 just mentioned, The Whyalla Basketball Association is the most popular, along with the Whyalla Soccer Association.

Hockey is still popular across Whyalla, with its league, the Whyalla Hockey Association, getting many players and even schools to join in with the Hockey Games. Fishing is also popular in Whyalla as well, with its beaches and jetty, it's considered one of the best places to fish in the Eyre Peninsula.

Whyalla Speedway (also known as Westline Speedway) takes place 3 kilometres northwest of the city, off Speedway Road (32°59′41″S 137°30′31″E). It opened on 30 April 1972 and holds racing for many classes, including sprint cars, sedans and stock cars. The venue hosts motorcycle speedway and held the South Australian Individual Speedway Championship in 1986.

== Sister cities ==
Whyalla's sister city is Texas City, Texas. It was proclaimed in 1984, during the sesquicentennials of both Texas and South Australia.

Ties with a former sister city, Ezhou in China, were cut in the 1990s. In 1997, both cities signed an agreement reestablishing their sister city relationship.

== Notable people from Whyalla ==
- Robert Bajic – soccer player
- Shantae Barnes-Cowan – actress
- Lachlan Barr – soccer player with Perth Glory
- Edwina Bartholomew – journalist and television presenter
- Max Brown – politician
- Brett Burton – former AFL player with the Adelaide Crows
- Alan Didak – AFL player with the Collingwood Football Club
- Karyne Di Marco – hammer thrower
- Alistair Edwards – Australian soccer player
- Connie Frazer – poet, feminist, and writer
- Sophie Gonzales – author and psychologist
- Gary Gray – Special Minister of State in the Gillard government
- Levi Greenwood – AFL player with the Collingwood Football Club
- Leigh Hoffman – cyclist
- Graeme Jose – Australian Olympic cyclist
- Catherine Ordway - Australian lawyer
- Rex Patrick – South Australian senator
- Ben Pengelley – cricketer
- Ian Rawlings – television actor
- Barrie Robran – South Australian National Football League player with North Adelaide Football Club
- Vern Schuppan – former Formula One driver
- Robert Shirley – AFL player with the Adelaide Crows
- Peter Stanley – historian
- Carl Veart – international soccer player who played 18 games for the Socceroos
- Darryl Wakelin – AFL footballer
- Shane Wakelin – AFL footballer
- Isaac Weetra – AFL player with the Melbourne Football Club
- Sean Williams – science fiction author
- Douglas Wood – engineer and Iraq war hostage
- Bianca Woolford – para-cyclist
- Stephen Yarwood – Lord Mayor of the City of Adelaide 2009–2014

== Gallery ==
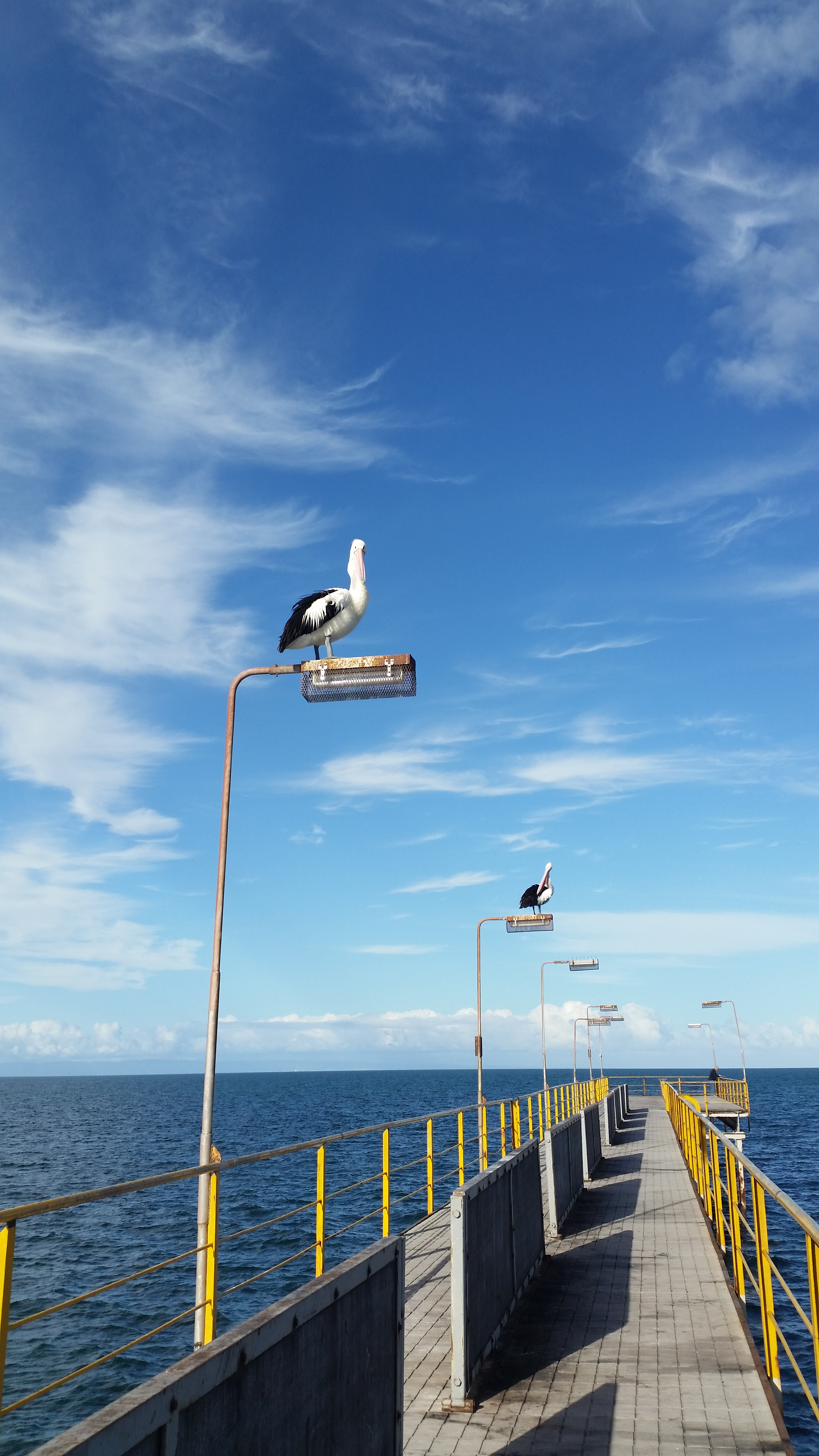
Whyalla Jetty

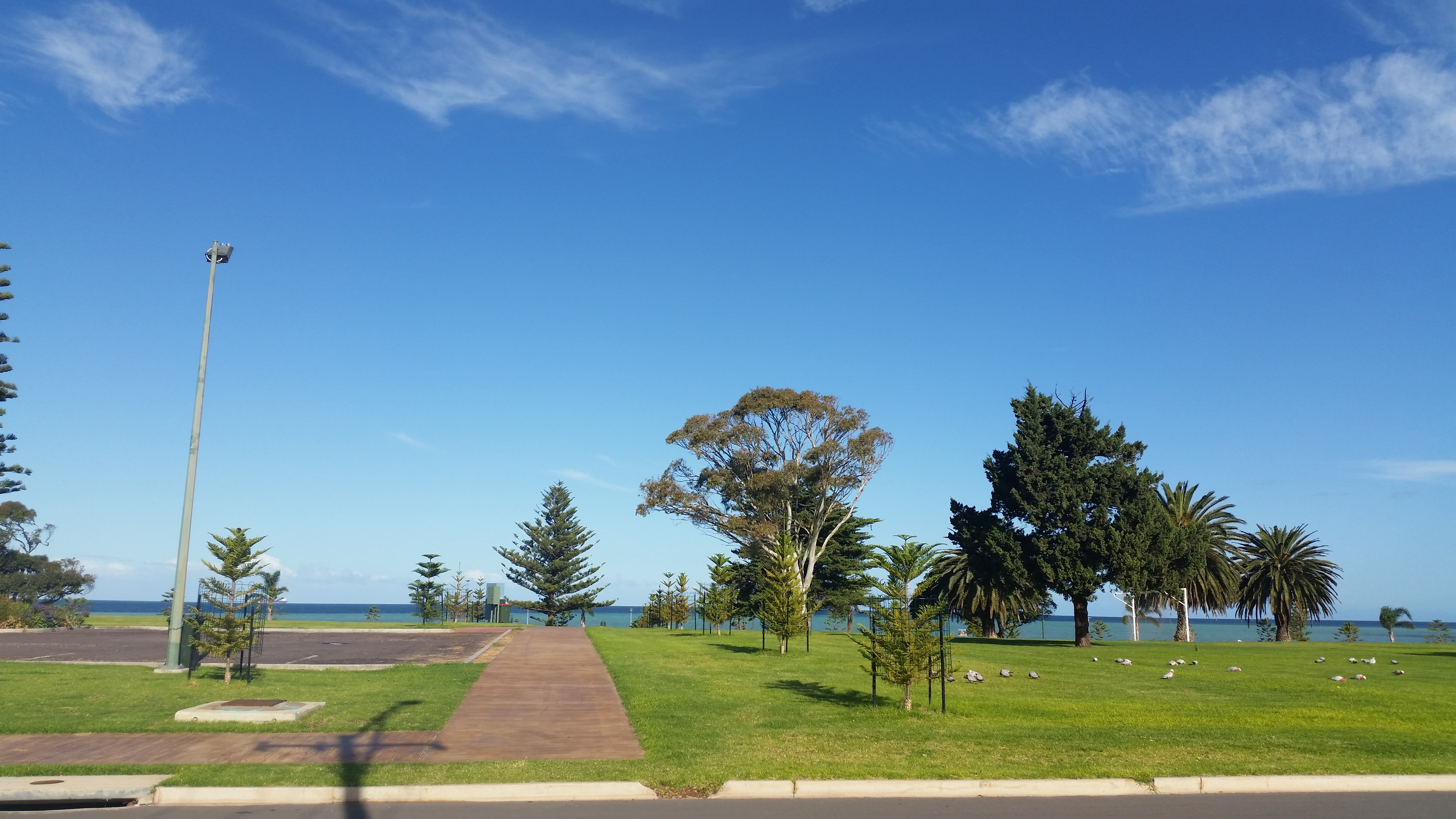
Whyalla foreshore

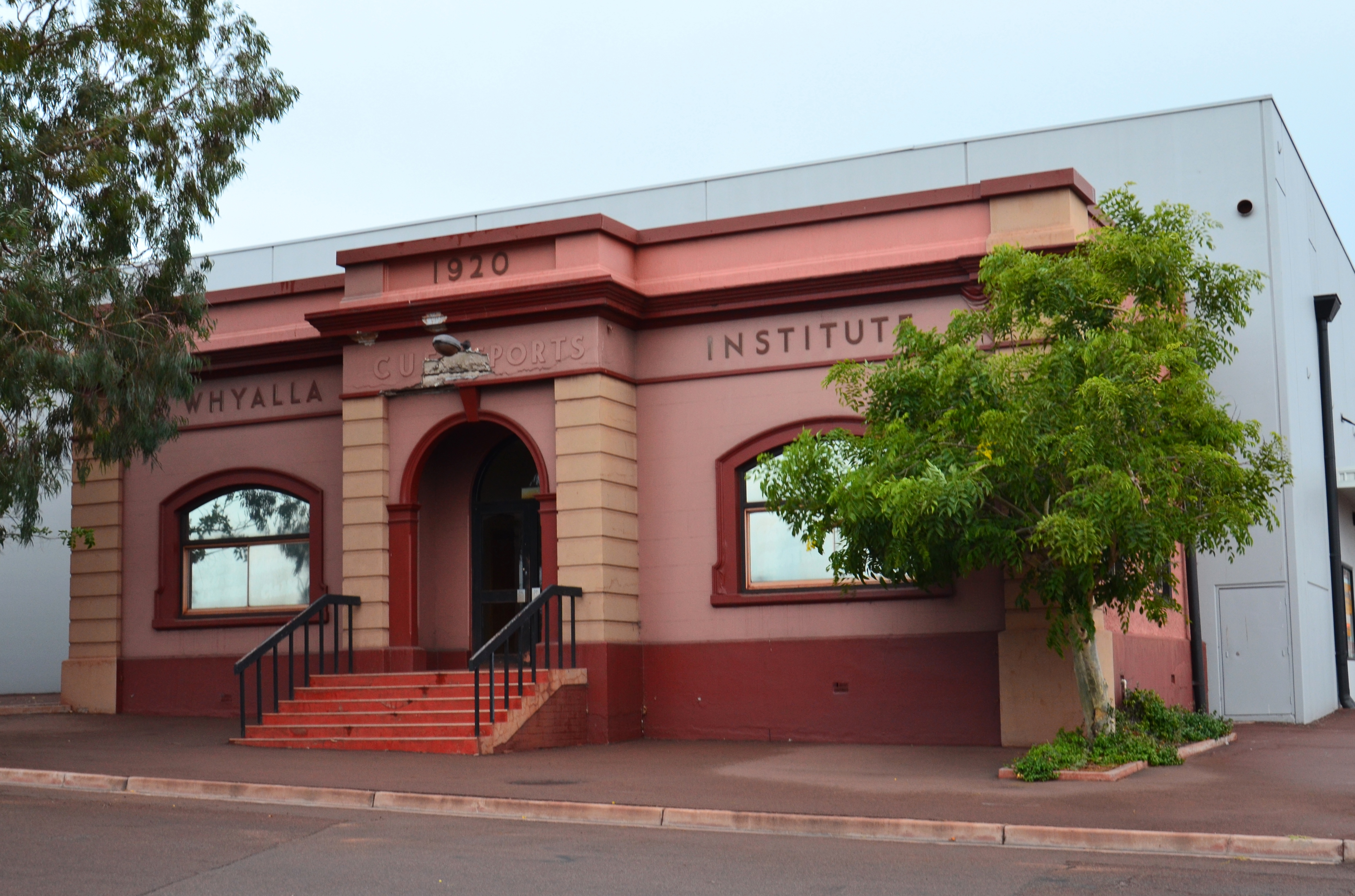
Whyalla Institute facade

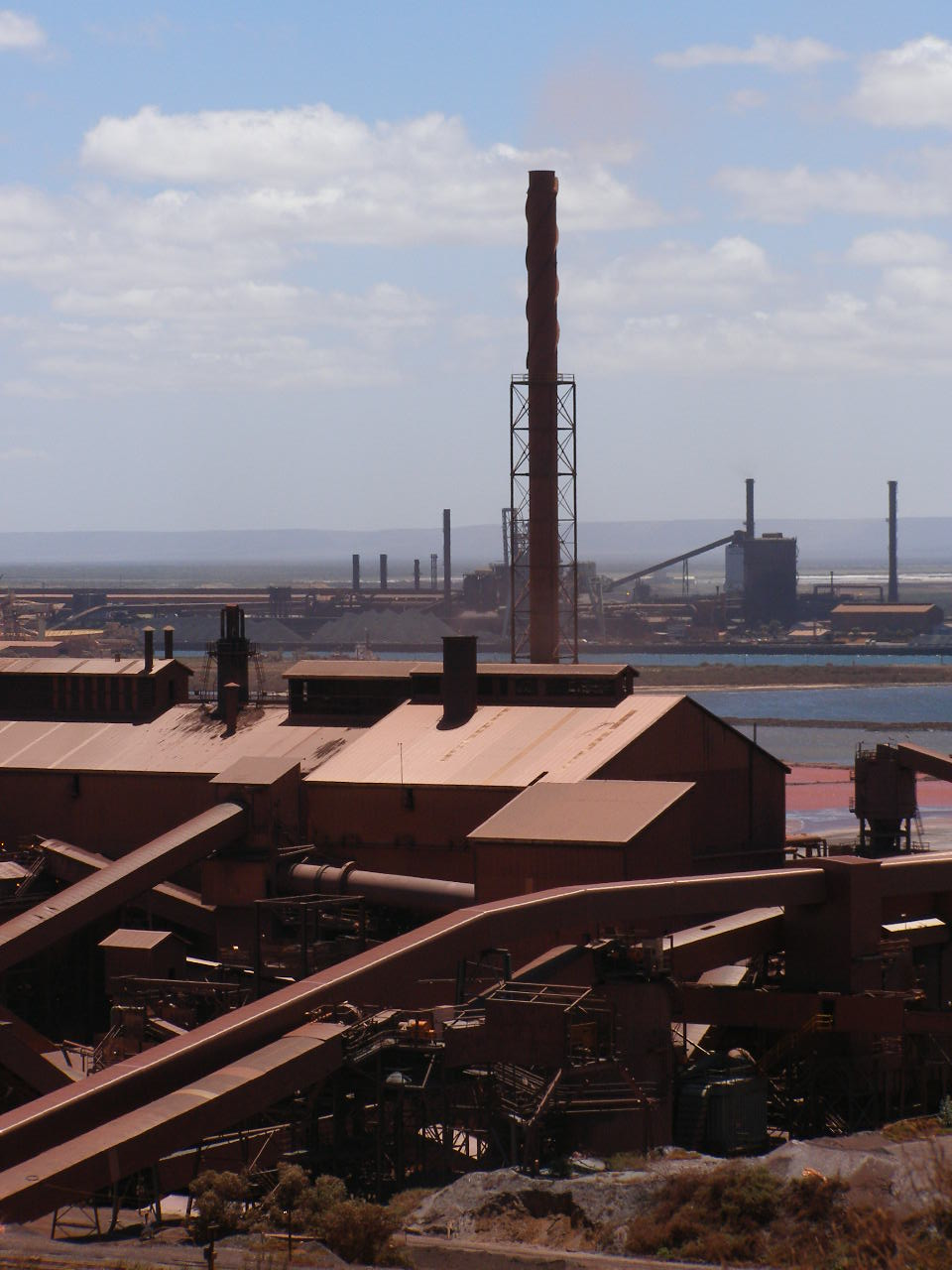
Ore handling at the port

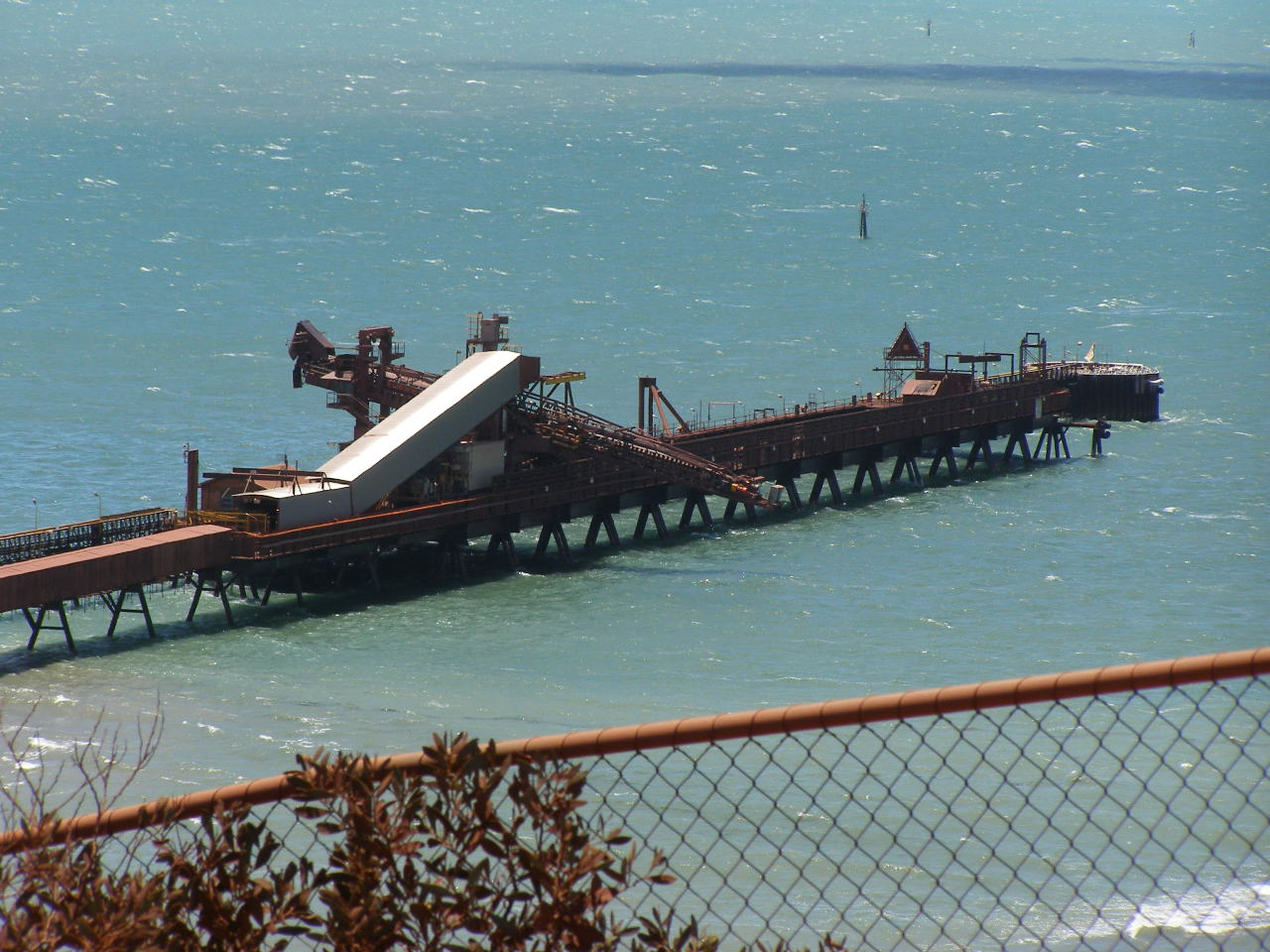
Port facility

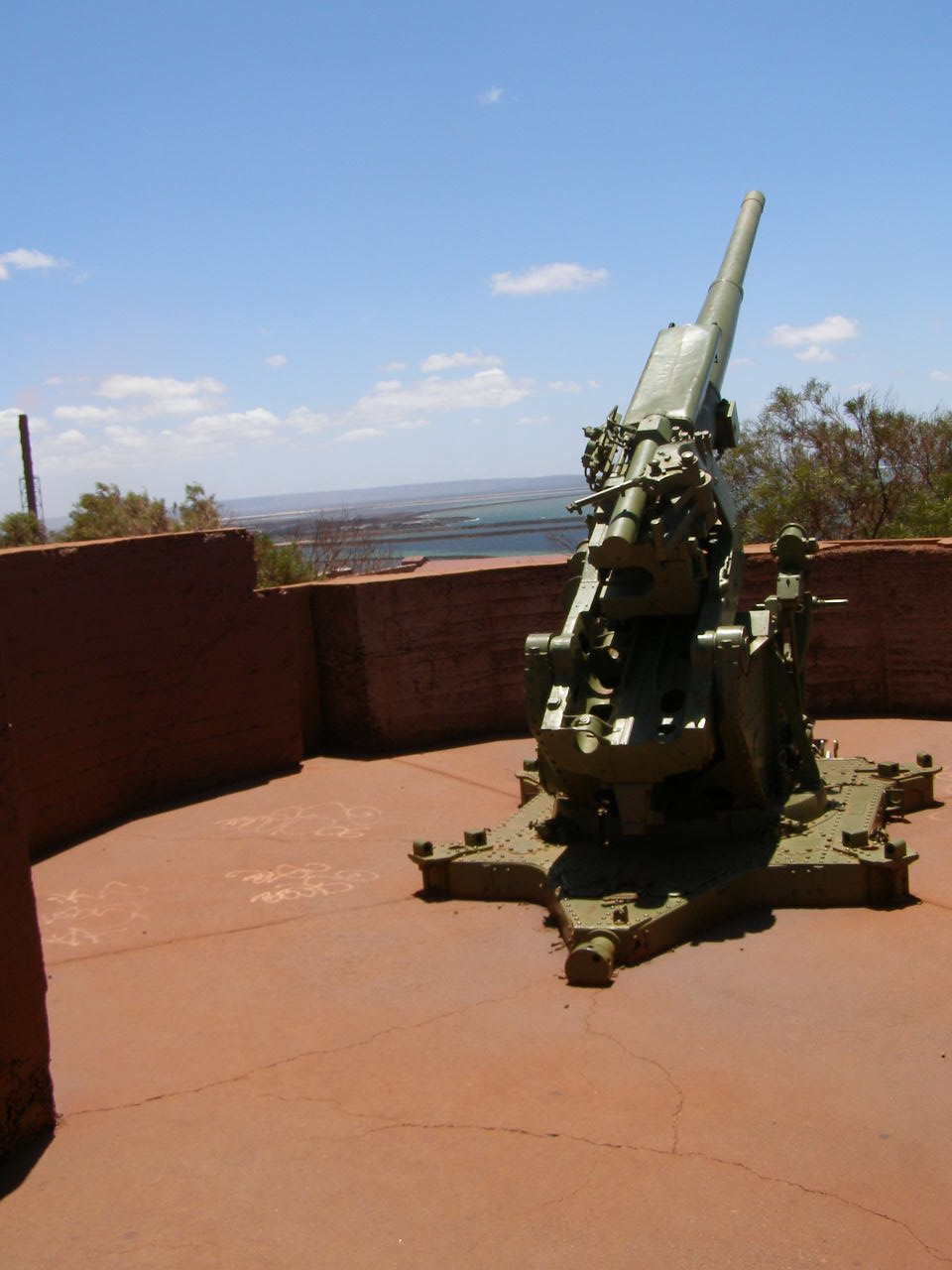
QF 3.7-inch AA gun from World War II at Hummock Hill

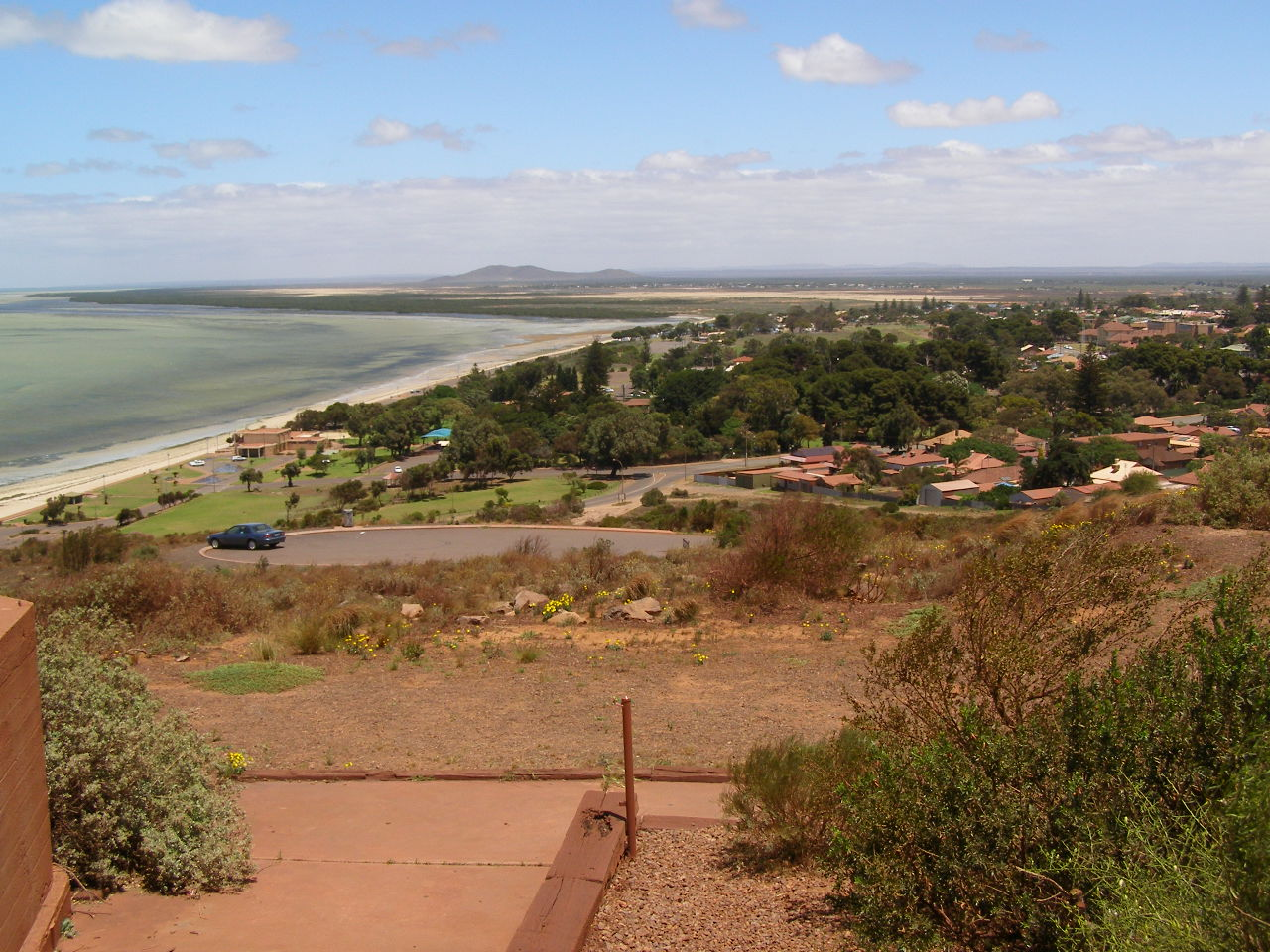
View of the coast from Hummock Hill
