= Electoral district of Giles =

South Australian state electoral district

Giles South Australia—House of Assembly
- Interactive map of electoral district boundaries
- State: South Australia
- Created: 1993
- MP: Eddie Hughes
- Party: Labor
- Namesake: Ernest Giles
- Electors: 27,240 (2026)
- Area: 28,690 km^{2} (11,077.3 sq mi)
- Demographic: Provincial and rural
- Coordinates: 29°39′S 133°52′E
Electorates around Giles:
WA	NT	NT
Flinders	Giles	Stuart
Flinders	Flinders	Stuart; Narungga

Footnotes
- Electoral District map

Giles is a single-member electoral district for the South Australian House of Assembly. Named after explorer Ernest Giles, its main population centre is the industrial city of Whyalla on the far south-east border of the seat which represents half of the electorate's voters. The electorate covers significant areas of pastoral leases and Pitjantjatjara Aboriginal land stretching to the Western Australian and Northern Territory borders, taking in the remote towns of Andamooka, Coober Pedy, Kaltjiti, Marla, Mimili, Mintabie, Oodnadatta, Pukatja and Tarcoola. Giles also has a far north mobile booth.

== History ==
Giles was created at the 1991 electoral redistribution to replace the abolished electoral district of Whyalla. It was the largest electorate in the state by area, covering 497,005 km^{2} (191,895 sq mi) of South Australian outback.

It covered an area that had traditionally been one of the few country areas where Labor consistently did well. Support for the party was particularly strong in the city of Whyalla, which had been a Labor bastion for most of the 20th century. Labor also had longstanding support in remote mining towns and indigenous communities. As a result, the Whyalla electorate had been in Labor hands without interruption since its creation in 1956, often giving Labor margins rivaling those in Adelaide.

Sitting Labor MP for Whyalla and incumbent Deputy Premier Frank Blevins had won a second term in 1989 with a safe 10.9 percent two-party preferred margin. However, upon the creation of Giles, Labor's two-party preferred margin was halved to 5.2 percent. At the 1993 election landslide, Blevins saw his margin cut to 2.4 percent. Giles was the only rural seat retained by Labor in an election where Labor was reduced to 10 seats in the 47 seat house. The election resulted in permanent swings away from Labor in most of country South Australia. Giles was the only rural Labor-held electorate until Labor won Light at the 2006 election landslide; since then Light has remained in Labor hands.

At the redistribution prior to the 1997 election, Giles was massively expanded beyond just Whyalla, stretching to the Western Australia and Northern Territory borders, taking in the western half of the abolished electorate of Eyre, with the eastern half going to the Port Augusta-based Stuart. The redistribution divided the northern South Australia outback into just two seats. However, the Labor majority actually ticked slightly upward to four percent. At this election Blevins retired, and his successor, Lyn Breuer, picked up a swing large enough to make Giles a safe Labor seat.

Breuer consolidated Labor's hold on the seat at subsequent elections before retiring from politics at the 2014 election, where Labor candidate Eddie Hughes retained the seat with only a small swing against him. He was re-elected in 2018, an election that saw the Liberals pushed into third place even as Labor lost government.

== Members for Giles ==
Member	Party	Term
Frank Blevins	Labor	1993–1997
Lyn Breuer	Labor	1997–2014
Eddie Hughes	Labor	2014–present

== Election results ==
2026 South Australian state election: Giles
Party	Candidate	Votes	%	±%
Labor	Eddie Hughes	10,450	48.7	−9.3
One Nation	Barry Drage	7,122	33.2	+26.8
Liberal	Sunny Singh	2,005	9.3	−8.5
Greens	Alex Taylor	1,150	5.4	+1.5
Family First	Gary Balfort	491	2.3	−0.5
Australian Family	Jasper Price	242	1.1	+1.1
Total formal votes		21,460	96.7	−0.9
Informal votes		731	3.3	+0.9
Turnout		22,191	81.5	−7.5
Two-party-preferred result
Labor	Eddie Hughes	12,547	58.5	−12.5
One Nation	Barry Drage	8,913	41.5	+41.5
Labor hold				
