= Indian Pacific =

Passenger train service in Australia

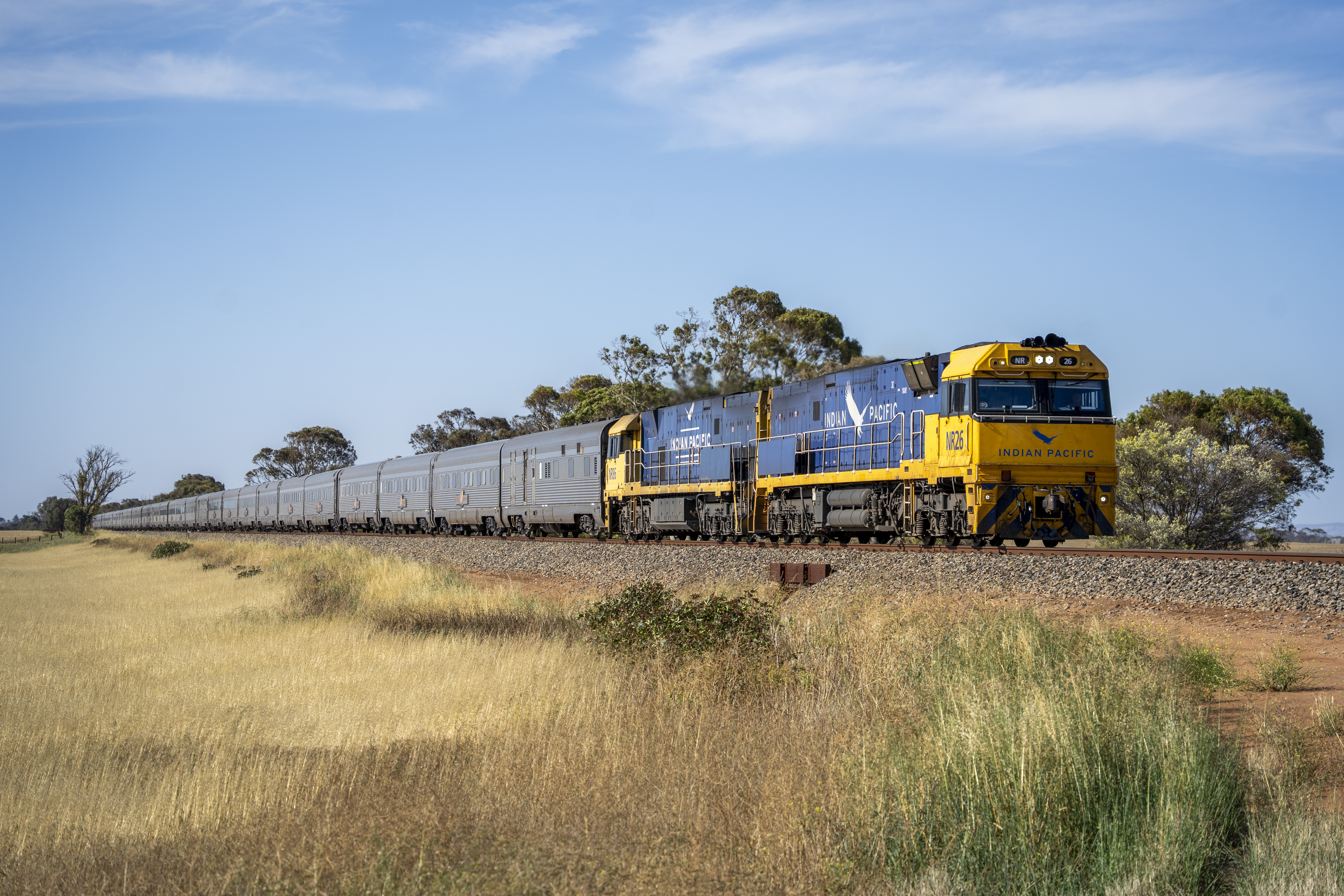
- The Indian Pacific passing through Mallala, South Australia, in 2025

Overview
- Service type: Transcontinental passenger rail
- Status: Operating
- Locale: Australia
- First service: 23 February 1970
- Current operator: Journey Beyond
- Former operators: Department of Railways New South Wales; South Australian Railways; Commonwealth Railways; Western Australian Government Railways; Australian National

Route
- Termini: Sydney Central; East Perth Terminal
- Distance travelled: 4,352 km (2,704 miles)
- Average journey time: 70.5–75 hours
- Service frequency: Weekly
- Lines used: Main Western; Broken Hill; Broken Hill-Crystal Brook; Crystal Brook-Adelaide; Trans-Australian; Eastern Goldfields; Eastern

On-board services
- Seating arrangements: No
- Sleeping arrangements: Yes
- Auto-rack arrangements: No

Technical
- Rolling stock: Commonwealth Railways stainless steel carriage stock
- Track gauge: 1,435 mm (4 ft 8 1/2 in) standard gauge
- Operating speed: 115 km/h (70 mph)
- Average length: 774 m (2,539 ft)

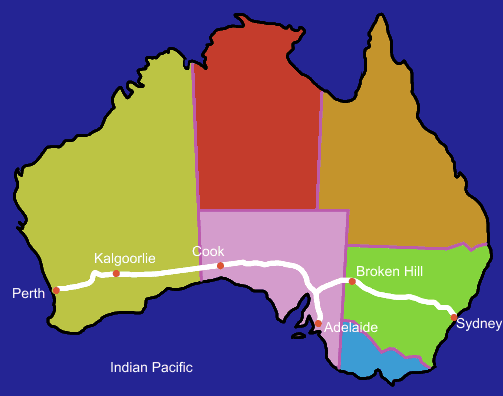

The Indian Pacific is a weekly experiential tourism-oriented passenger train service that traverses Australia's east–west rail corridor between Sydney, on the shore of the Pacific Ocean, and Perth, on the shore of the Indian Ocean. It first ran in 1970 after the completion of gauge conversion projects in South Australia and Western Australia, enabling for the first time a cross-continental rail journey without a break of gauge.

The train has been rated as one of the great rail journeys of the world. Its route includes the world's longest straight stretch of railway track, a 478 km (297-mile) stretch of the Trans-Australian Railway across the Nullarbor Plain.

The service was originally operated jointly by four government railway administrations: the Department of Railways New South Wales, South Australian Railways, Commonwealth Railways and Western Australian Government Railways, until February 1993 when Australian National took full ownership. In 1997, the Indian Pacific was sold to Great Southern Rail, now branded as Journey Beyond due to changes in corporate ownership.

A one-way trip takes between 70.5 and 75 hours, depending on scheduling and daylight saving periods. As of 2022, two levels of service were offered, Platinum and Gold. A motorail service conveyed passengers' motor vehicles on the train between Adelaide and Perth, but as of 2025 is no longer available.

== History ==
With the remaining narrow gauge parts of the East-west rail corridor being gauge converted to standard gauge in 1966, the Department of Railways New South Wales, South Australian Railways, Commonwealth Railways and Western Australian Government Railways agreed that a through passenger service from Sydney Central to East Perth Terminal be inaugurated. Originally to be named The Transcontinental, in 1969, the Indian Pacific name was adopted by a joint meeting of transport ministers.

The service was originally operated jointly by the four operators whose networks it traversed, with revenues and costs apportioned Department of Railways New South Wales (28.5%), South Australian Railways (10%), Commonwealth Railways (45%) and Western Australian Government Railways (16.5%).

The first Indian Pacific service left Sydney on 23 February 1970, becoming the first direct train to cross the Australian continent, made possible by the completion of the east-west standard gauge project a few months earlier. At the time it was the third longest passenger train in terms of distance, after services on the Trans-Siberian Railway and the Canadian.

Locomotives and crews were provided by the Department of Railways New South Wales between Sydney and Broken Hill, South Australian Railways between Broken Hill and Port Pirie, the Commonwealth Railways between Port Pirie and Kalgoorlie, and Western Australian Government Railways between Kalgoorlie and Perth. With the formation of Australian National in July 1975, it provided locomotives and crews from Broken Hill to Kalgoorlie. Locomotives were changed at Lithgow, Broken Hill, Port Pirie and Kalgoorlie.

On-board crews were originally provided between Sydney and Port Pirie by Commonwealth Railways on one service and New South Wales Government Railways on the other services, Commonwealth Railways between Port Pirie and Kalgoorlie and West Australian Government Railways between Kalgoorlie and Perth.

The train originally operated twice per week. In times of heavy demand, a double consist would operate. It would operate in New South Wales as two trains before being combined at Broken Hill.

In July 1973, a third service was introduced, followed in July 1975 by a fourth, as extensions of existing Trans-Australian services. In October 1976, a motorail service was introduced between Port Pirie and Perth. Originally vehicles were loaded in Perth at the Kewdale Freight Terminal before a car loading ramp was built at East Perth station.

From 2 December 1982 to 25 April 1983, the service was suspended due to an industrial dispute over staffing levels in South Australia. When it resumed, the service was reduced to three times weekly, with the second class sleepers replaced by sitting carriages.

From August 1986, the train commenced operating via Adelaide. In October 1988, the motorail service was extended through to Sydney.

In June 1991, the service was cut from three times a week to two. This was reduced to weekly in January 1992 between Sydney and Adelaide with two services a week between Adelaide and Perth.

In February 1993, Australian National took over operation of the service after an agreement was reached with the State Rail Authority and Westrail in 1992. A second service resumed in August 1993.

From January 1994, the service was operated by Australian National CL class locomotives.

As part of the privatisation of Australian National, the Indian Pacific, along with The Ghan and The Overland, was sold to Great Southern Rail, now known as Journey Beyond Rail Expeditions, in October 1997. Motive power provision was contracted to National Rail.

Since 2016, the Indian Pacific has operated weekly. A second service operated between September and November until 2015. In 2016, all economy class seats were removed, raising the minimum ticket price of an Adelaide-Broken Hill ticket from A$187 (equivalent to $218.3 in 2022) to A$689 (equivalent to $804.31 in 2022) (the ability to book a ticket to/from Broken Hill was later removed), and of a Sydney-Perth ticket from A$939 (equivalent to $1,096 in 2022) to A$2,049 (equivalent to $2,392 in 2022).

== Route ==
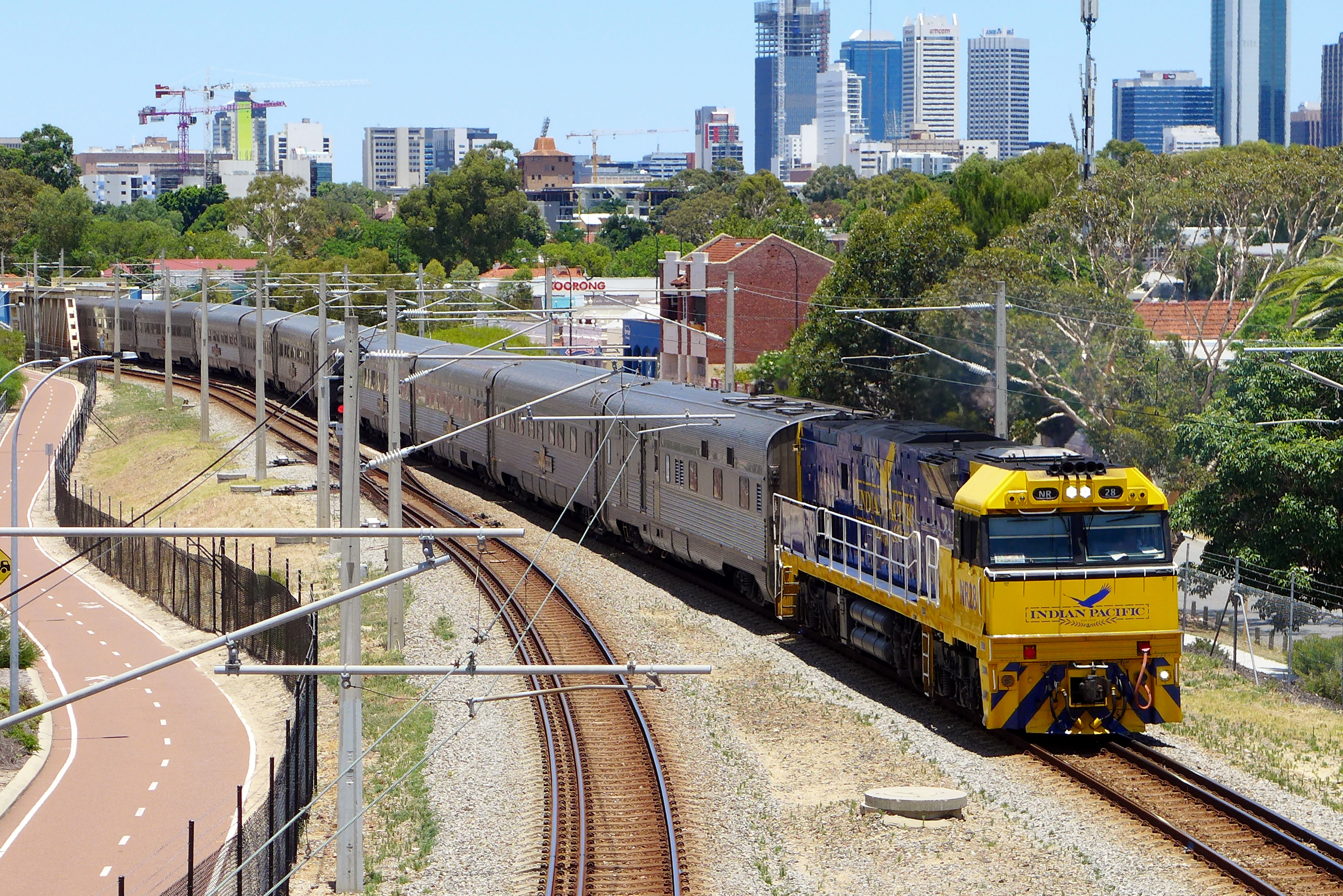
NR28 in Indian Pacific livery with an eastbound service at Mount Lawley in December 2014

The route leaves Sydney and travels via the Western and Broken Hill lines to Broken Hill. It then crosses into South Australia on the Broken Hill to Crystal Brook line before heading south to Adelaide. Before the conversion of the Crystal Brook to Adelaide line to standard gauge, passengers for Adelaide had to change at Port Pirie. From August 1986, the Indian Pacific was diverted to make an out-and-back trip to Adelaide adding 390 km (240 miles) to the journey.

From Crystal Brook, it heads north to Port Augusta and then via the Trans-Australian Railway to Kalgoorlie, including travelling over the world's longest straight stretch of railway track on the Nullarbor Plain measuring 478 km (297 miles). It then heads via the Eastern Goldfields and Eastern lines to its terminus at East Perth.

The highest point on the line is at Bell, NSW in the Blue Mountains, at 1,100 m (3,600 ft).

The most northern point on the line is at the western tip of the Yellabinna Regional Park, South Australia.

The most southern point on the line is at the Adelaide Parklands Terminal in Keswick, South Australia.

Occasionally, when there is trackwork, the Indian Pacific is diverted out of Sydney via the Main South line to Cootamundra and cross-country line to rejoin the Broken Hill line at Parkes. It has previously operated via the Temora to Roto line and via Melbourne.

In 1970, the journey took 75 hours. With subsequent infrastructure improvements and reductions to the time needed to change locomotives and crew, by 2010 the journey took 65 hours, despite the longer distance.

== Rolling stock ==
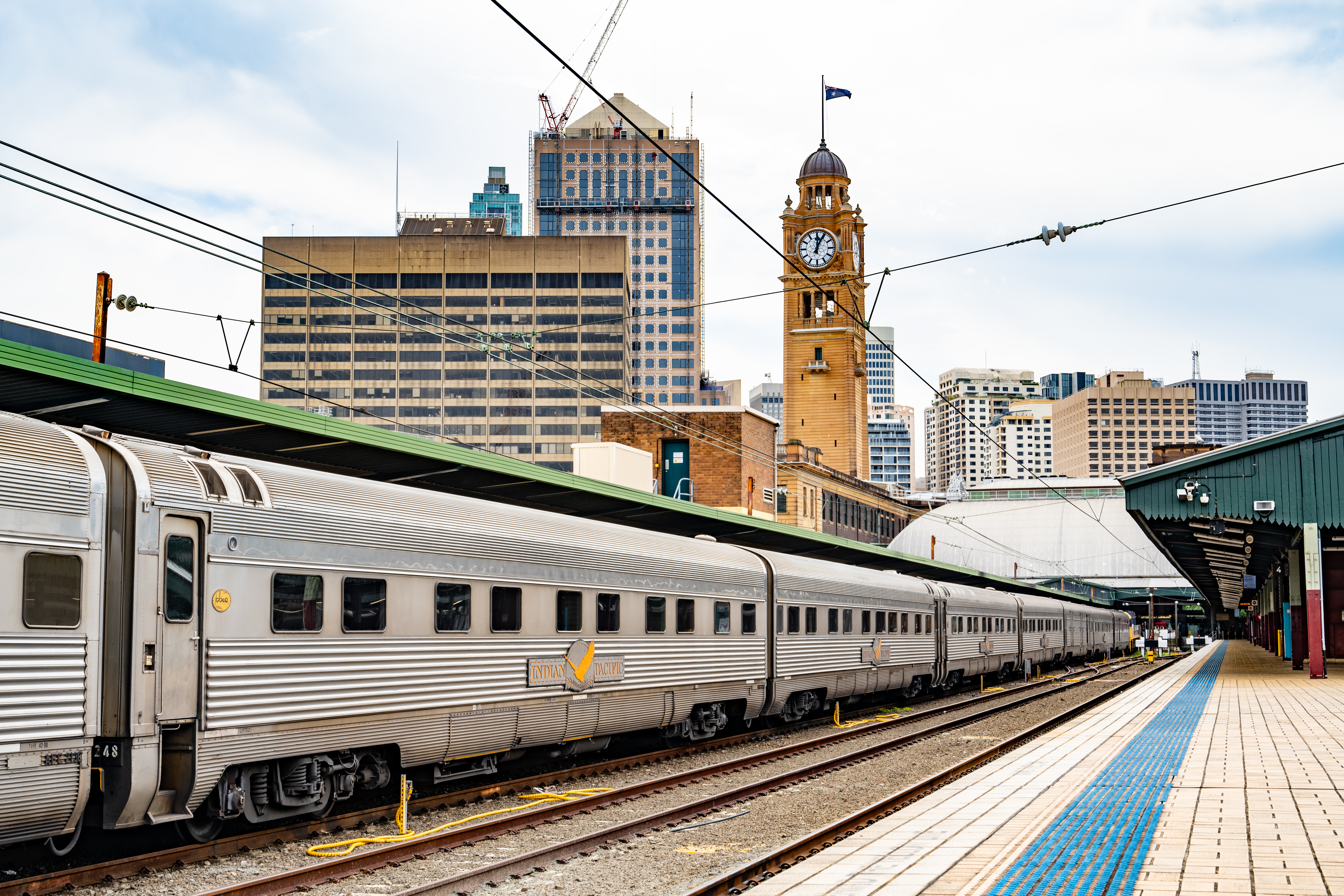
Comeng built passenger carriages

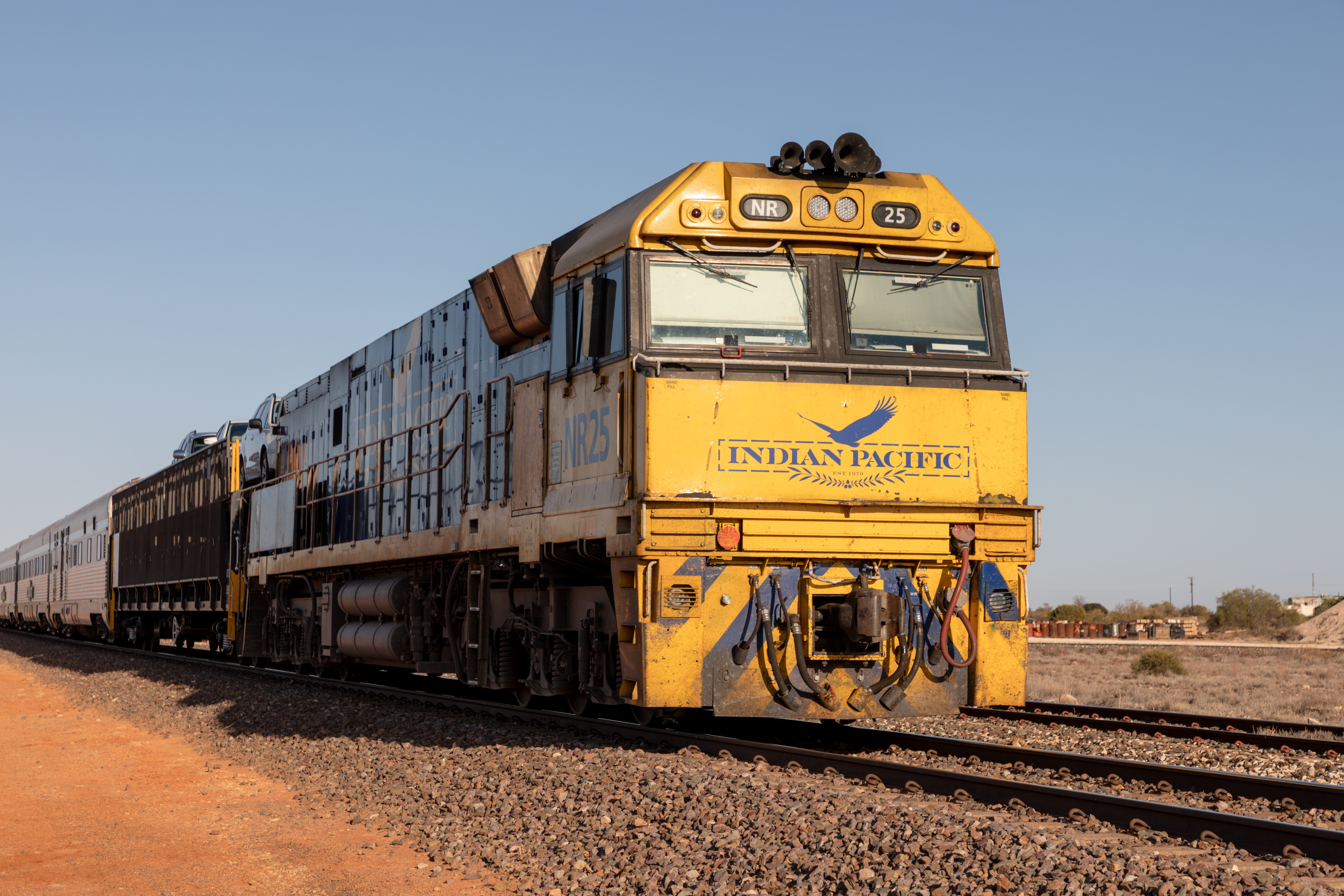
A NR class locomotive

For the commencement of operations, 59 stainless steel carriages, power vans and luggage vans were built by Commonwealth Engineering, Granville to the same design as already in use on the Trans-Australian. These operated in consists of 12 carriages. A further 16 were ordered in 1971.

As of 2020, the weekly service consists of up to 25 carriages and two motorail wagons. Because of its length, the train is split in two when stabled at Sydney Central station. Originally, each of the operators hauled the train over their network with locomotives changed at Broken Hill, Port Pirie and Kalgoorlie. A further change occurred at Lithgow from electric to diesel power. Due to Westrail suffering a motive power shortage, Australian National locomotives hauled the service in Western Australia from October 1973 until March 1977.

From January 1994, the service was operated by Australian National CL class locomotives. Since November 1997, it has been hauled by Pacific National NR class locomotives. Seven NR class, (NR18, NR25-NR29, NR86) have been repainted in differing Indian Pacific liveries.

The lead locomotive is assisted by an 81, G or second NR class between Sydney and Adelaide. In 2014, NR25-NR28 were repainted in a new livery that is much closer to that of Pacific National. In 2018, NR29 and NR86 had Indian Pacific signwriting applied their existing liveries.

== Passenger facilities ==
The train originally had 52 first-class sleeping berths and 96 second-class sleeping berths. However, the train was limited to 144 passengers, as this was the number that could be serviced by three sittings in the 48-seat dining car.

From 1973, the accommodation was altered to provide 88 first-class sleeping berths and 64 second-class. The club-cafeteria car also provided a small number of second-class seats for short-distance travellers on the Commonwealth Railways segment.

From 1975, Australian National provided full sitting carriages west of Port Pirie on two journeys per week. The Department of Railways New South Wales initially resisted providing sitting accommodation over the whole journey, but Public Transport Commission HUB/RUB sitting carriages were included between Sydney and Port Pirie from 1974, with Australian National providing sitting carriages from Broken Hill to Peterborough for an onward connection to Adelaide.

By 1979, the Public Transport Commission carriages were operating from Sydney to Peterborough. In 1981, this was extended to Port Pirie.

In 1988, sitting carriages provided by Australian National with Commonwealth Railways carbon steel carriage stock became part of the full through service from Sydney to Perth.

The train formerly had four classes, Platinum, Gold Service, Red Service Sleeper and Red Service Daynighter. The Platinum Service was introduced in 2008 as a premium class of travel. The Gold Service, the former first-class service, features either roomette or twinette sleeper cabins, with complimentary meals in the restaurant car.

Red Service, the equivalent of economy class, featured dual-berth shared sleeper cabins and airline-style 'sit-up' seats similar to other Australian trains. It had its own restaurant car. In July 2016, Red Service was withdrawn after a Federal Government subsidy was withdrawn, making the Red Service no longer financially viable.

The train had a motorail service to carry passengers' motor vehicles. This facility was available throughout the journey until November 2015, when it was reduced to only operate between Adelaide and Perth. As of 2025, motorail is no longer available on the Indian Pacific.

== Special trains ==
A full Indian Pacific set made promotional trips to Canberra and Newcastle for travel agents prior to its launch in February 1970.

Further trips were made to Canberra in 1981 and 1985, and to Newcastle in 1975, 1976, 1977 and 1979.

In June 1995, following the conversion of the Adelaide to Melbourne railway line to standard gauge, the Indian Pacific made a promotional trip from Perth to Brisbane via Melbourne over 6 days.

== Christmas train ==
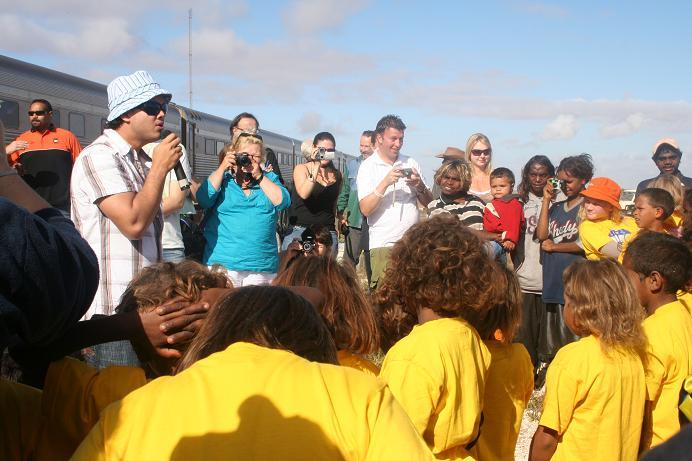
In 2005, the Indian Pacific Christmas train stopped at the remote siding of Watson, where excited schoolchildren listened to singer Guy Sebastian

For more than a decade, the Indian Pacific operated a Christmas train with a noted musical artist on board, stopping at locations including the remote Nullarbor Plain sidings of Watson, Cook, and Rawlinna. Some of the performers were Nikki Webster (2000), John Williamson (2001), Marcia Hines (2002), John Paul Young (2003), Jimmy Barnes (2004), Guy Sebastian (2005), Human Nature (2006), David Campbell (2007), Brian McFadden (2012) and Rikki-Lee Coulter (2013).

== Media depictions ==
- In 1980, the Indian Pacific featured in an episode of BBC Television's Great Railway Journeys of the World series, presented by Michael Frayn.
- In 2019 it was the subject of an SBS "slow television" documentary: the entire journey from Perth to Sydney was condensed into a three-hour show with no voiceover, much of it comprising footage directly from the front or sides of the train.
- In November 2019, the Indian Pacific featured in Great Australian Railway Journeys, presented by Michael Portillo.
- In 2019, the train was featured in an episode of Discovery Channel Canada's Mighty Trains.

== Incidents ==
- 18 February 1970: On a test run from Port Pirie, an Indian Pacific set struck a derailed freight train near Locksley ripping the sides out of several carriages.
- 24 December 1975: 13 of the 25 carriages on the eastbound train derailed due to a collapsed bogie on the leading carriage, east of the remote Nullarbor Plain siding of Rawlinna. Three of the 200 passengers were injured; they were flown from Forrest to Adelaide.
- 24 January 1978: The westbound train derailed near Forbes as a result of wet weather washing away part of the track. The train had been diverted south through Forbes, because of washaways between Parkes and Broken Hill. Three of the 153 passengers were taken to Forbes District Hospital.
- 18 August 1999: Zanthus train collision – the westbound train was accidentally directed into a crossing loop occupied by an eastbound train at Zanthus.
- 3 December 1999: Glenbrook train disaster – a CityRail Intercity train ran into the back of the eastbound train at Glenbrook in the Blue Mountains, west of Sydney. Seven people died, all on the CityRail train.
- 26 November 2017: At 10:12 am, just 600 m (2,000 ft) after departing from East Perth station, the Indian Pacific, heading for Sydney, derailed. "The second carriage jumped the tracks, grinding the train-ride to a halt".

== Gallery ==
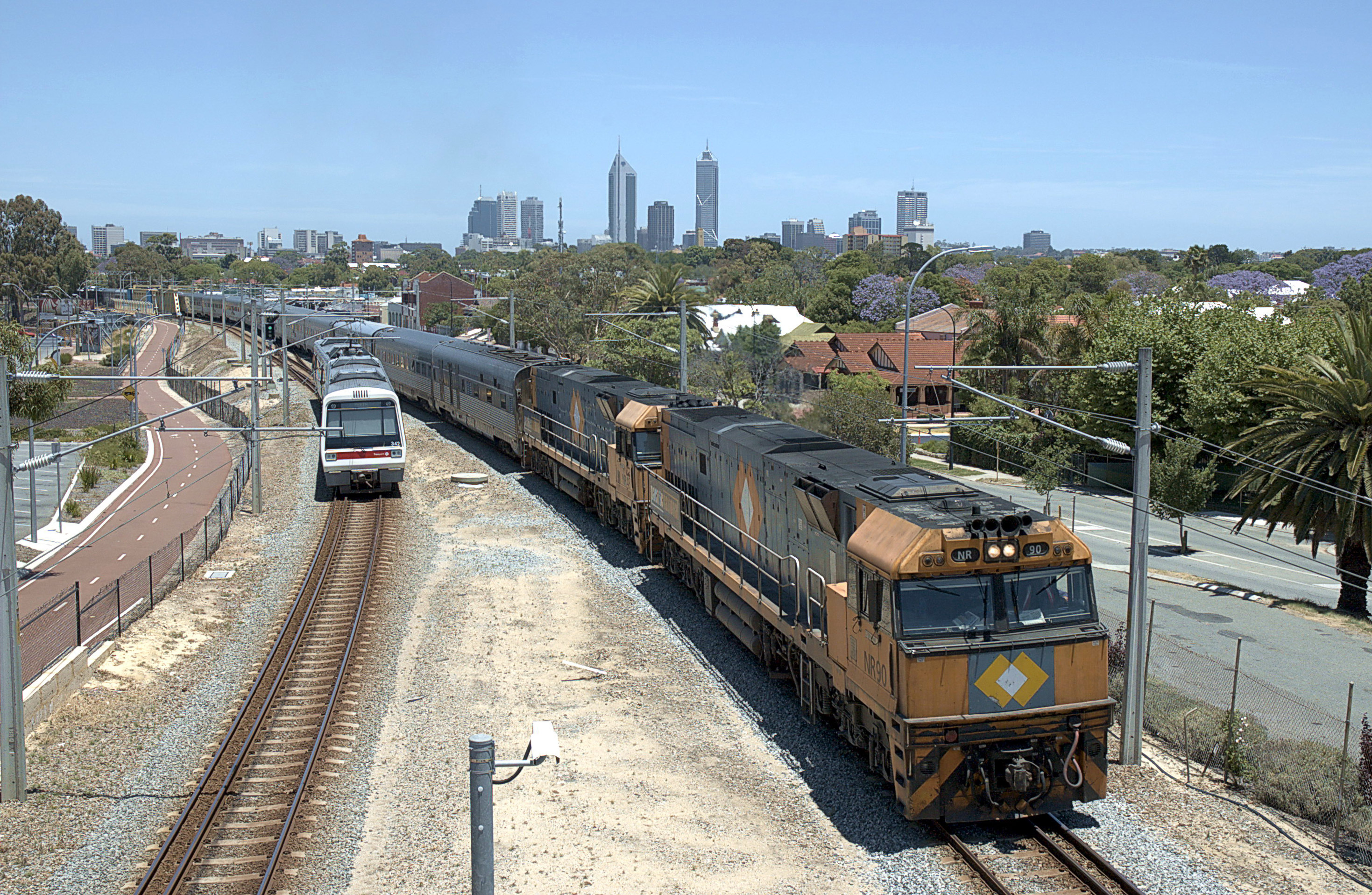
A National Rail liveried NR90 leads the Indian Pacific heads through suburban Perth in December 2005

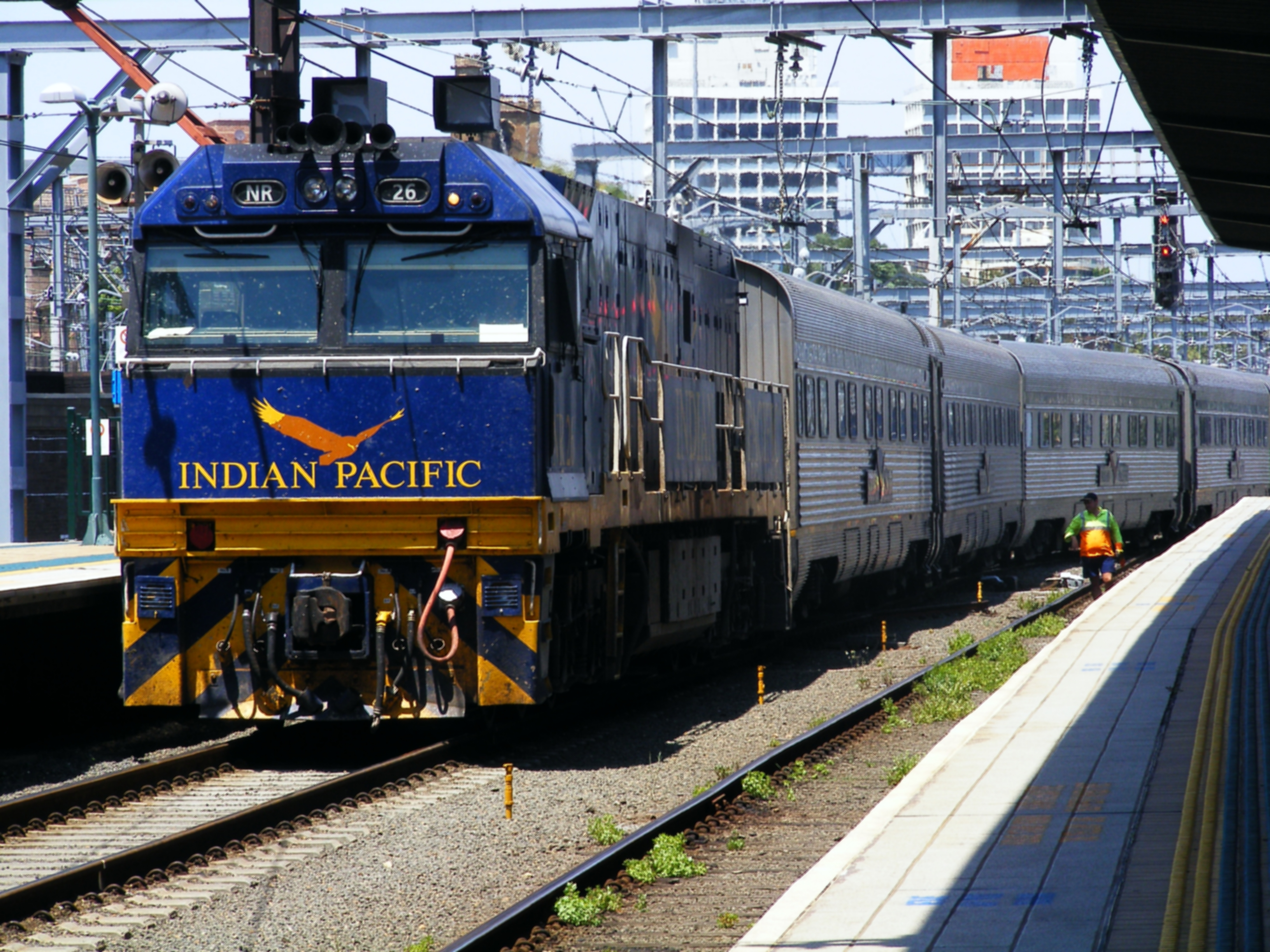
An Indian Pacific liveried NR26 shunts at Central railway station, Sydney in January 2008

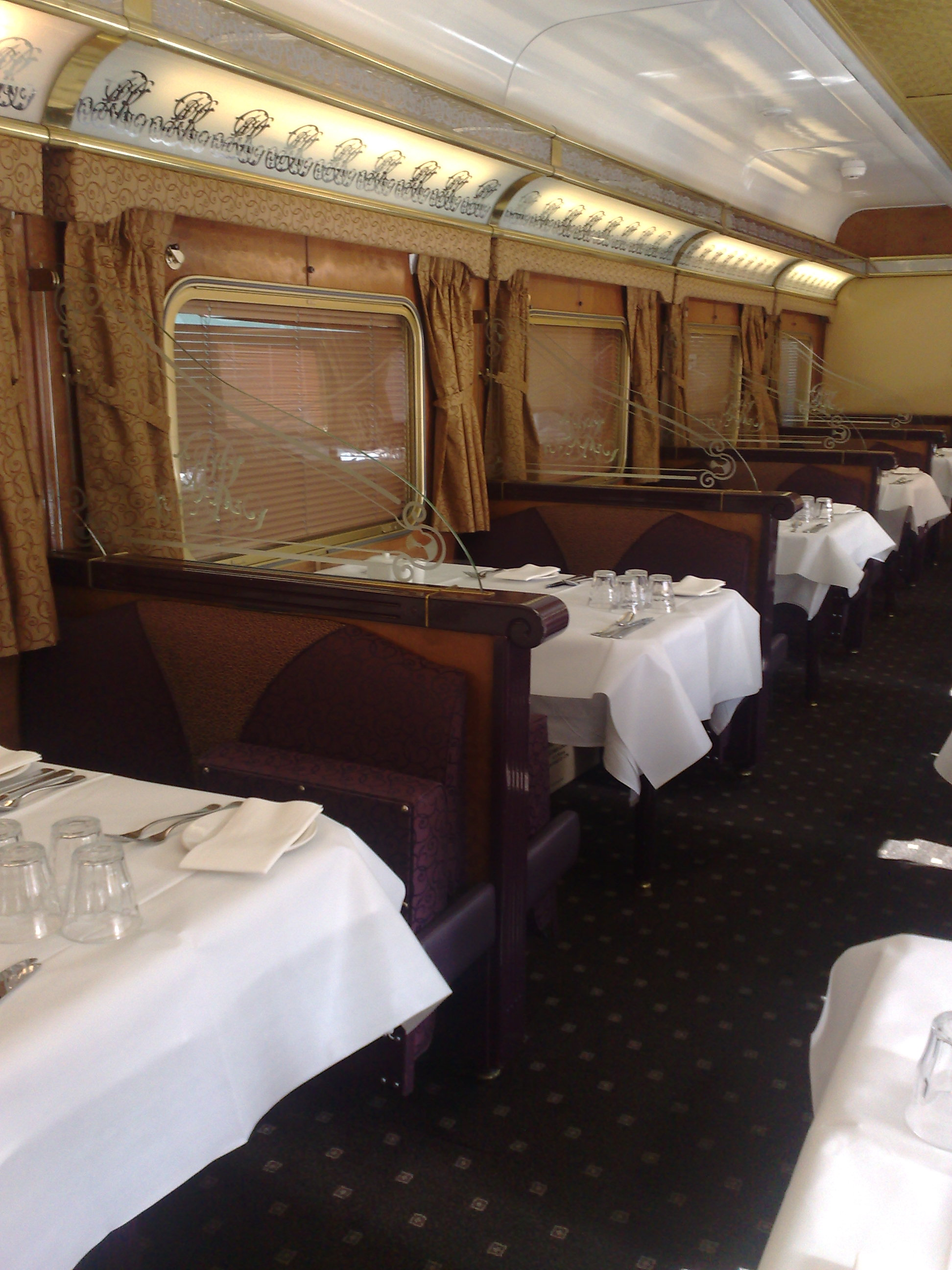
A dining car interior in January 2010
