= Zanthus train collision =

Railway accident in Western Australia

Details
- Date: 18 August 1999; 17:06
- Location: Zanthus, Western Australia; 739 km (459 mi) NE from Perth
- Coordinates: 31°01′S 123°34′E
- Country: Australia
- Line: Trans-Australian Railway
- Operator: National Rail; Great Southern Rail
- Incident type: Collision
- Cause: Driver error

Statistics
- Trains: 2
- Deaths: 0
- Injured: 21

On 18 August 1999, at 5:06 pm AWST, a National Rail freight train and an Indian Pacific passenger train collided with each other at a crossing loop near Zanthus, Western Australia.

== Incident ==
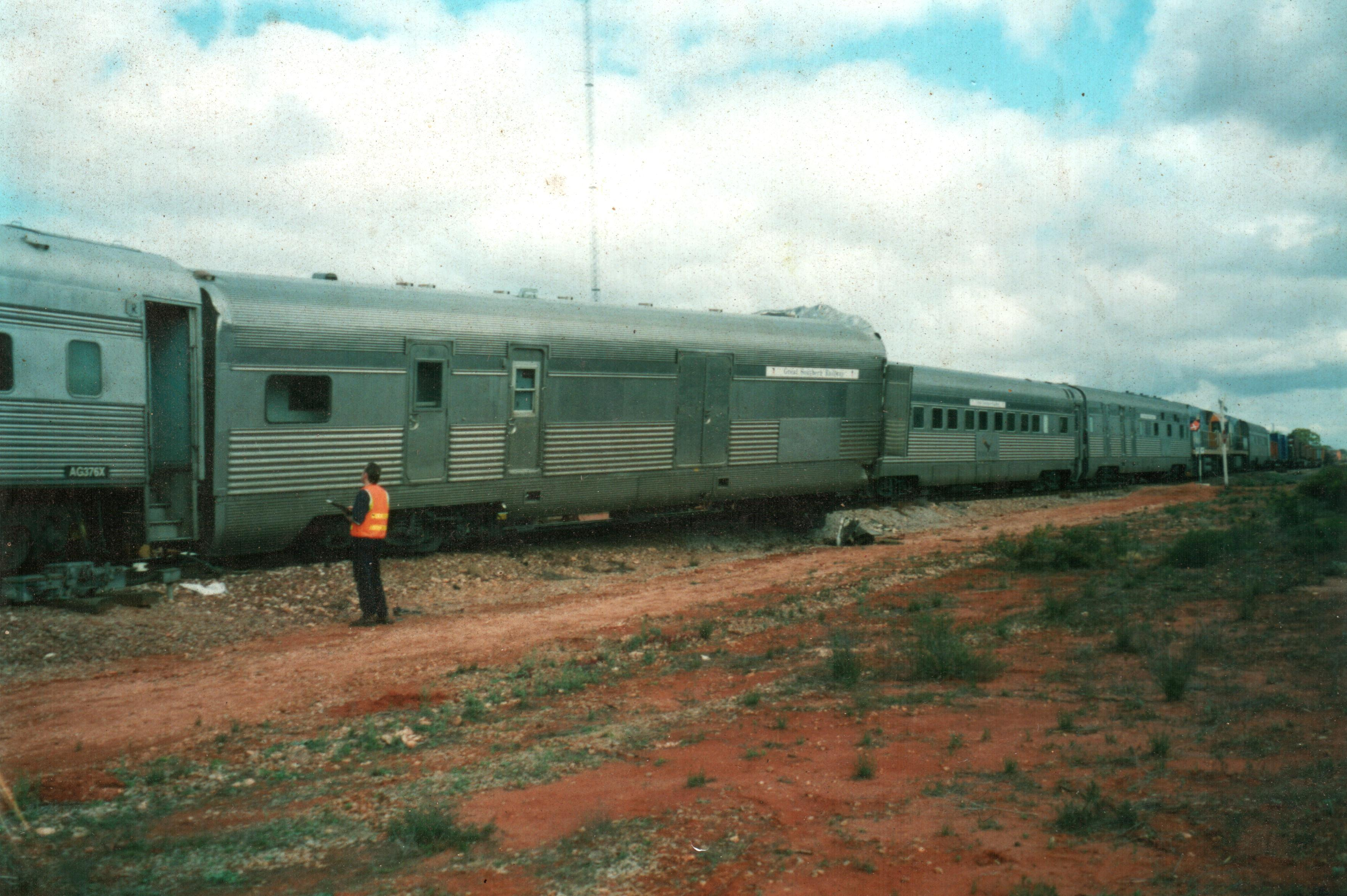
Derailed Indian Pacific carriages

On 18 August 1999 an eastbound freight train was waiting at the departure end of the crossing loop for a westbound Indian Pacific passenger train to pass through.

The second engineman was waiting at the control panel for the points for the opposing train to pass through. Out of habit he had the control panel box unlocked and opened. He pressed the button to operate the points at an inappropriate time, and the opposing train was diverted at a speed of about 40 km/h (25 mph) into the loop where it could not stop in time to avoid a head-on collision. The speed at the point of impact was 27 km/h.

== Injuries and damage ==
Twenty-one passengers and crew from the Indian Pacific were airlifted by the Royal Flying Doctor Service to Kalgoorlie Hospital from the remote Coonana airstrip, 40 km (25 mi) from the crash site. Only two passengers were admitted for overnight observations. Westrail provided two Prospector railcars to transfer the remainder of the passengers back to Kalgoorlie.

All nineteen carriages of the Indian Pacific received varying degrees of damage, from minor internal damage to the write-off of several carriages. As at March 2007, some abandoned carriages remained at the site. Great Southern Rail estimated the damage to the carriages to be of the $5 million, National Rail estimated the damage to NR class locomotives NR15 and NR51 at around $1 million.

== Aftermath ==
Since the accident, the operation of the points at this and other crossing loops was altered so that the point indicator lights will not operate until the access process is completed, and this gives all trains time to stop at the red point indicator lights.

This accident happened because the points were not fully interlocked, and were merely a kind of power-assisted hand lever, with automatic normalisation.
