= Australian National AN class =

Australian diesel-electric locomotives

Australian National AN Class
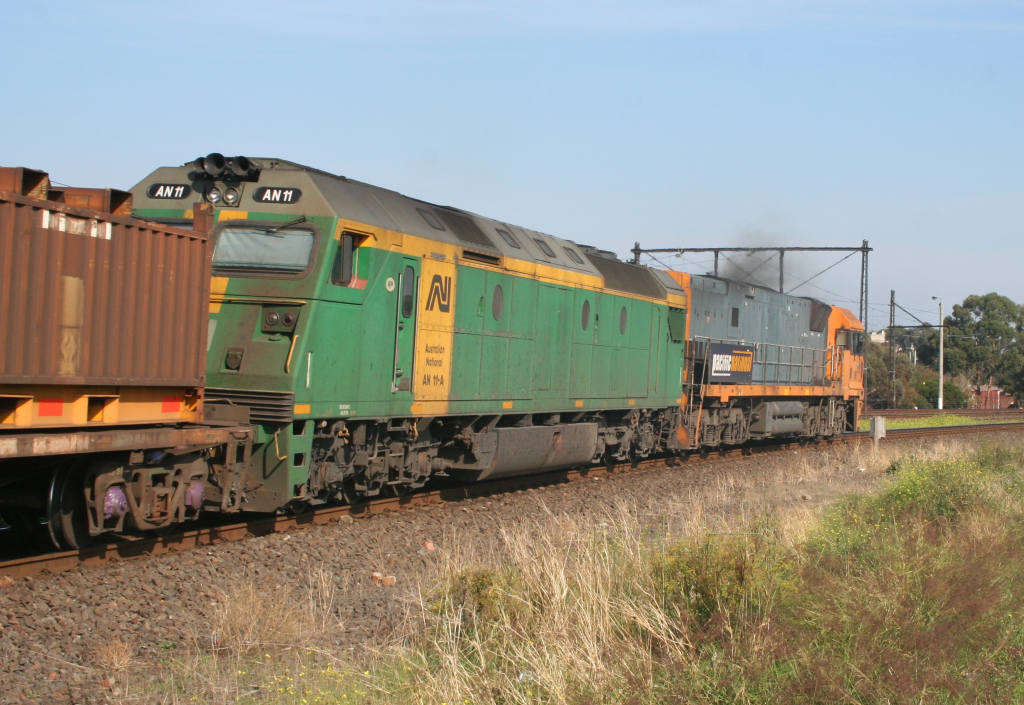
- AN11 in Australian National livery trailing behind an NR class at Newport in May 2008
Type and origin
- Power type: Diesel-electric
- Builder: Clyde Engineering, Somerton
- Serial number: 92-1297 to 92-1299; 93-1300 to 93-1307
- Model: EMD JT46C
- Build date: 1992–1993
- Total produced: 11
Specifications
- Configuration
  - UIC: Co-Co
- Gauge: 1,435 mm (4 ft 8 1/2 in) standard gauge
- Length: 22.60 m (74 ft 2 in)
- Fuel type: Diesel
- Prime mover: EMD 16-710G3A
- Engine type: V16 diesel
- Aspiration: Turbocharger
- Generator: EMD AR11
- Cylinders: 16
- Transmission: Electric
- MU working: Yes
- Loco brake: Westinghouse air brake Dynamic brake
- Train brakes: Westinghouse air brake
- Safety systems: Vigilance
Performance figures
- Maximum speed: 150 km/h (93 mph)
- Power output: 3,030 kW (4,063 hp)
- Tractive effort: (Continuous) 323 kN (73,000 lbf) at 26 km/h (16 mph)
Career
- Operators: Australian National; National Rail; The Ghan; Pacific National
- Number in class: 11
- Numbers: AN1–AN11
- Delivered: 1992
- First run: 1992
- Current owner: Pacific National
- Disposition: 10 stored, 1 scrapped

The AN class is a class of diesel locomotives built by Clyde Engineering, Somerton for Australian National in 1992–1993.

== History ==
In the early 1990s, Australian National was pursuing with their fleet modernisation program to replace its first-generation diesel locomotives, of which many had recorded over six million kilometres in distance. AN placed an order in 1991 to Clyde Engineering for 11 locomotives, fitted with Electro-Motive Division's 16-710G3A prime mover. Dubbed the AN class, they were essentially a more powerful version of the previous DL class, while the body design features a raked cab, similar to the EL class.^{: p. 28}

Built at Clyde's Somerton plant and delivered via New South Wales from October 1992 to March 1994, they entered service on Australian National's standard gauge network from Broken Hill to Adelaide, Alice Springs and Perth. In 1995, all were leased to National Rail with the transfer of Australian National's interstate operations.^{: p. 28}

They also saw service on The Ghan from Darwin to Adelaide, using their 150 km/h top speed to their advantage. Until around late 2013, AN3 was regularly used for the service, wearing The Ghan's red and silver livery between July 2004 and 2014.^{: pp. 29, 33, 36}

These locos are limited to 130 km/h when trailing behind an NR class locomotive, which the AN class work with.

In January 1996, AN10 was destroyed in the Hines Hill train collision, with its remains being cut up at Port Augusta in late 1997. In November 1997, the remaining 10 were sold to National Rail,^{: pp. 28-29} passing into Pacific National ownership with the sale of National Rail in early 2002.^{: p. 29}

== Future ==
As of January 2023, AN class locomotives were generally used as trailing locomotives on Intermodal and Steel services between Melbourne, Adelaide and Sydney. They were commonly used as second locomotives on steel trains in New South Wales, Victoria, South Australia and Western Australia. The class faced storage in Melbourne due to combined high operational costs and mechanical failures. It has been rumoured they will be stored in Werris Creek, New South Wales.^{: p. 36}

AN2 was the first to be withdrawn on 23 December 2022. By March 2023, the entire class had been stored, with all except AN1 (which was in Port Augusta) in storage at South Dynon.^{: p. 36}

In December 2023 the class made a return to service with AN1 running from Port Augusta on 4PM4 (3 December) and returning 6MP5 (9 December) after a trip Spotswood. AN3 and AN8 were also at Spotswood.

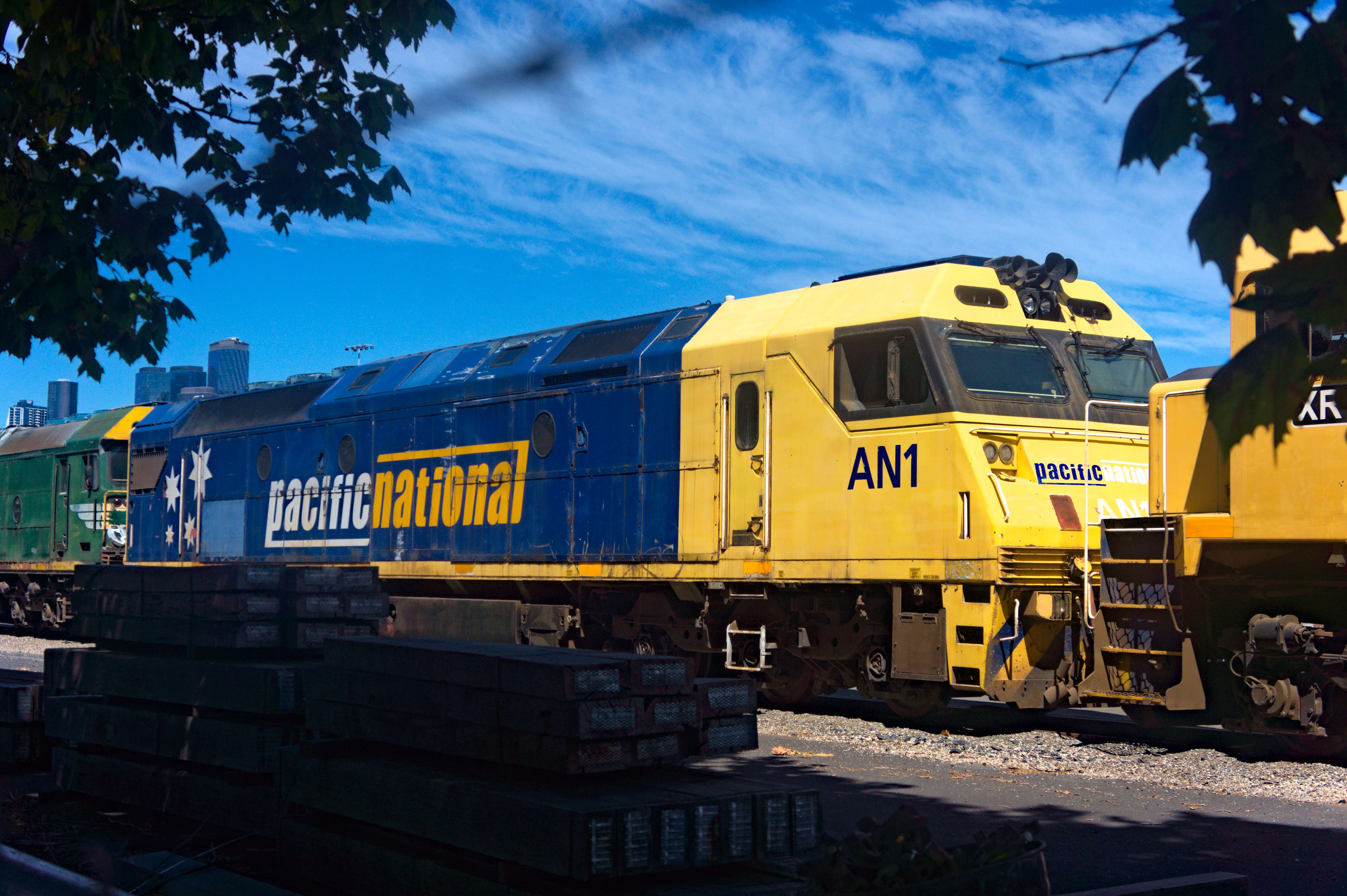
AN1 stored at South Dynon, February 2026.

In September 2024, AN3 and AN8 were transferred to Port Augusta on 1MP2. They are expected to be stored there. AN1 was withdrawn from service sometime in 2024 and as of late 2025 is currently stored at South Dynon.

== Fleet status ==
Key:	In service	Stored	Preserved	Rebuilt	Under overhaul	Scrapped

Locomotive	Serial no	Completed	Withdrawn	Owner	Livery	Status
AN1	92-1297	1992		Pacific National	Pacific National blue & yellow	Stored, North Dynon
AN2	92-1298	1992		Pacific National	Pacific National blue & yellow	Stored, North Dynon
AN3	92-1299	1992		Pacific National	Pacific National blue & yellow	Stored, Port Augusta
AN4	93-1300	1993		Pacific National	Pacific National blue & yellow	Stored, North Dynon
AN5	93-1301	1993		Pacific National	Pacific National blue & yellow	Stored, North Dynon
AN6	93-1302	1993		Pacific National	Pacific National blue & yellow	Stored, North Dynon
AN7	93-1303	1993		Pacific National	Pacific National blue & yellow	Stored, North Dynon
AN8	93-1304	1993		Pacific National	Pacific National blue & yellow	Stored, Port Augusta
AN9	93-1305	1993		Pacific National	Pacific National blue & yellow	Stored, North Dynon
AN10	93-1306	1993	1996	National Rail	Australian National green & yellow	Scrapped (accident damaged)
AN11	93-1307	1993		Pacific National	Pacific National blue & yellow	Stored, North Dynon
