= National Rail NR class =

Class of Australian diesel-electric locomoitves

National Rail NR class (UGL Rail Cv40-9i)
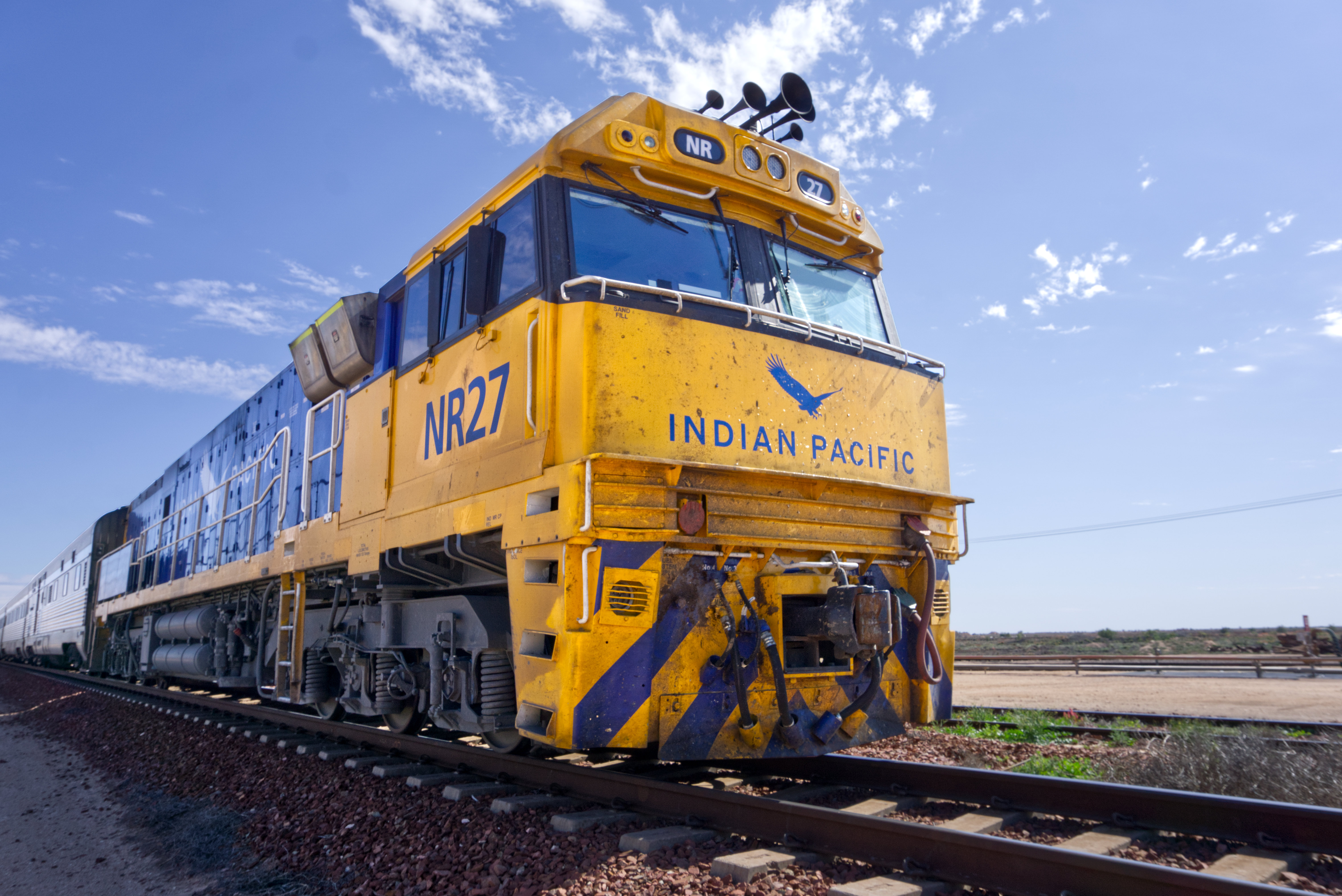
- NR27 in the Indian Pacific MK V livery at Cook, South Australia
Type and origin
- Power type: Diesel-electric
- Builder: A Goninan & Co; Broadmeadow (NR1–NR60); Bassendean (NR61–NR120)
- Model: General Electric Cv40-9i
- Build date: 1996–1998
- Total produced: 120
Specifications
- Configuration
  - UIC: Co-Co
- Gauge: 1,435 mm (4 ft 8 1/2 in) standard gauge
- Bogies: Co-Co
- Length: 22 m (72 ft 2 in)
- Width: 2.94 m (9 ft 8 in)
- Height: 4.25 m (13 ft 11 in)
- Loco weight: 132 tonnes
- Fuel type: Diesel
- Fuel capacity: 12,500 litres (2,700 imp gal; 3,300 US gal)
- Prime mover: GE 7FDL-16
- RPM range: 1,050 rpm
- Engine type: V16 engine
- Generator: GE GMG196
- Traction motors: GE 5GE793A1
- Head end power: No
- Cylinders: 16
Performance figures
- Maximum speed: 115 km/h (71 mph)
- Power output: 3,000 kW (4,000 hp)
- Tractive effort: 520 kN (116,900.65 lbf)
Career
- Operators: National Rail (original); Pacific National (current)
- Number in class: 120
- Numbers: NR1, NR2, NR4–NR32, NR34–NR40, NR42–NR78, NR81–NR122
- Delivered: 17 September 1996
- First run: 18 September 1996
- Current owner: Pacific National
- Disposition: 117 in service, 3 scrapped

The NR class are Australian diesel-electric locomotives built by A Goninan & Co for National Rail between 1996 and 1998. They are currently operated by Pacific National. The C44aci model locomotives built by UGL Rail at Broadmeadow adopted the design from the NR Class.

== History ==
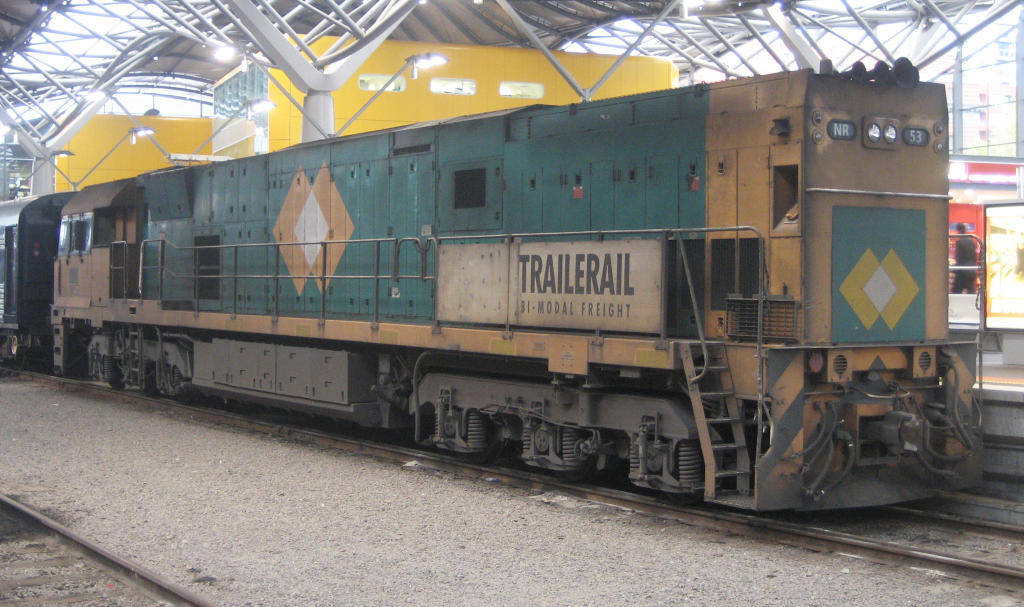
Trailerail liveried NR53 at Southern Cross station on The Overland duties in May 2007

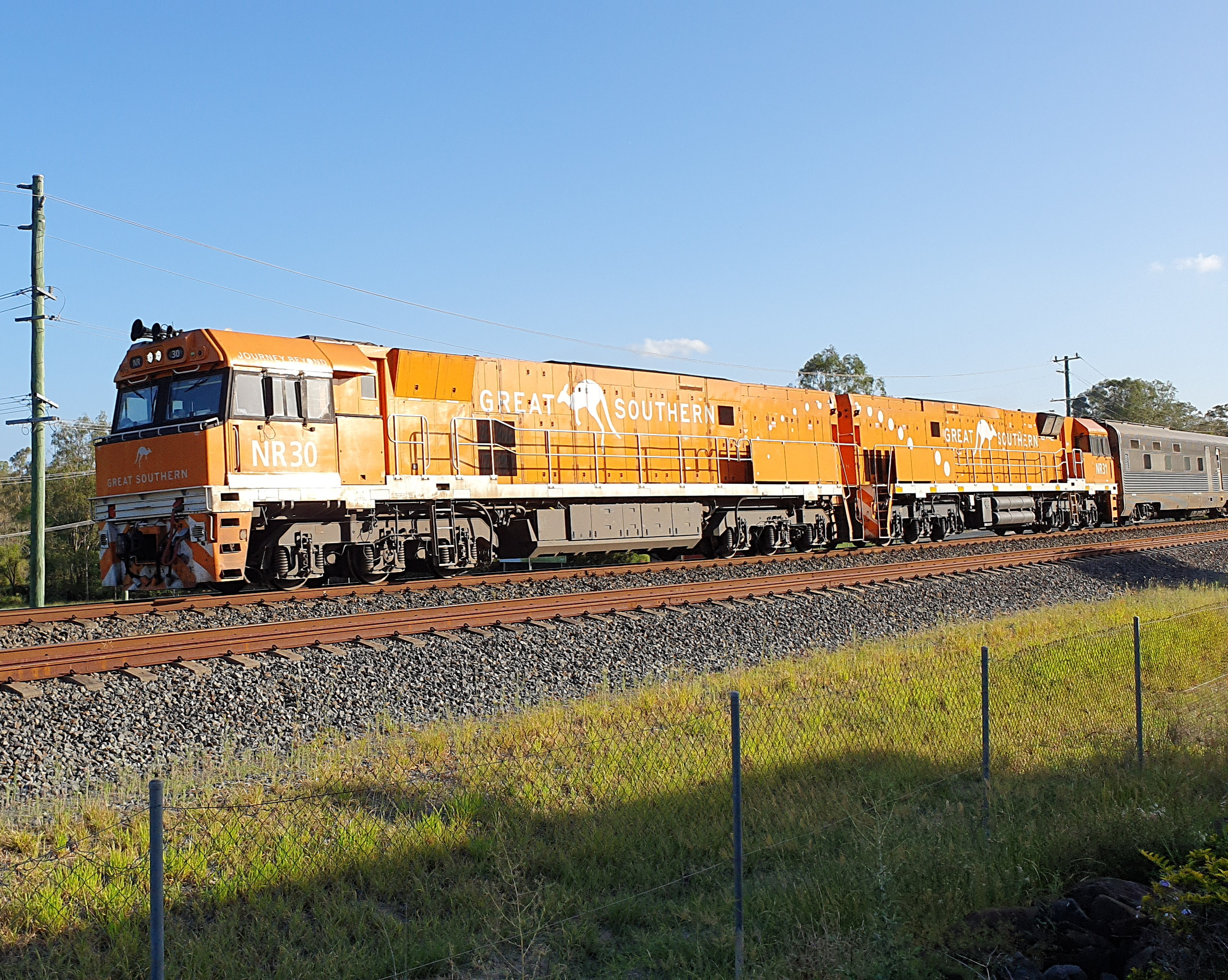
NR30 and NR31 in the Great Southern livery

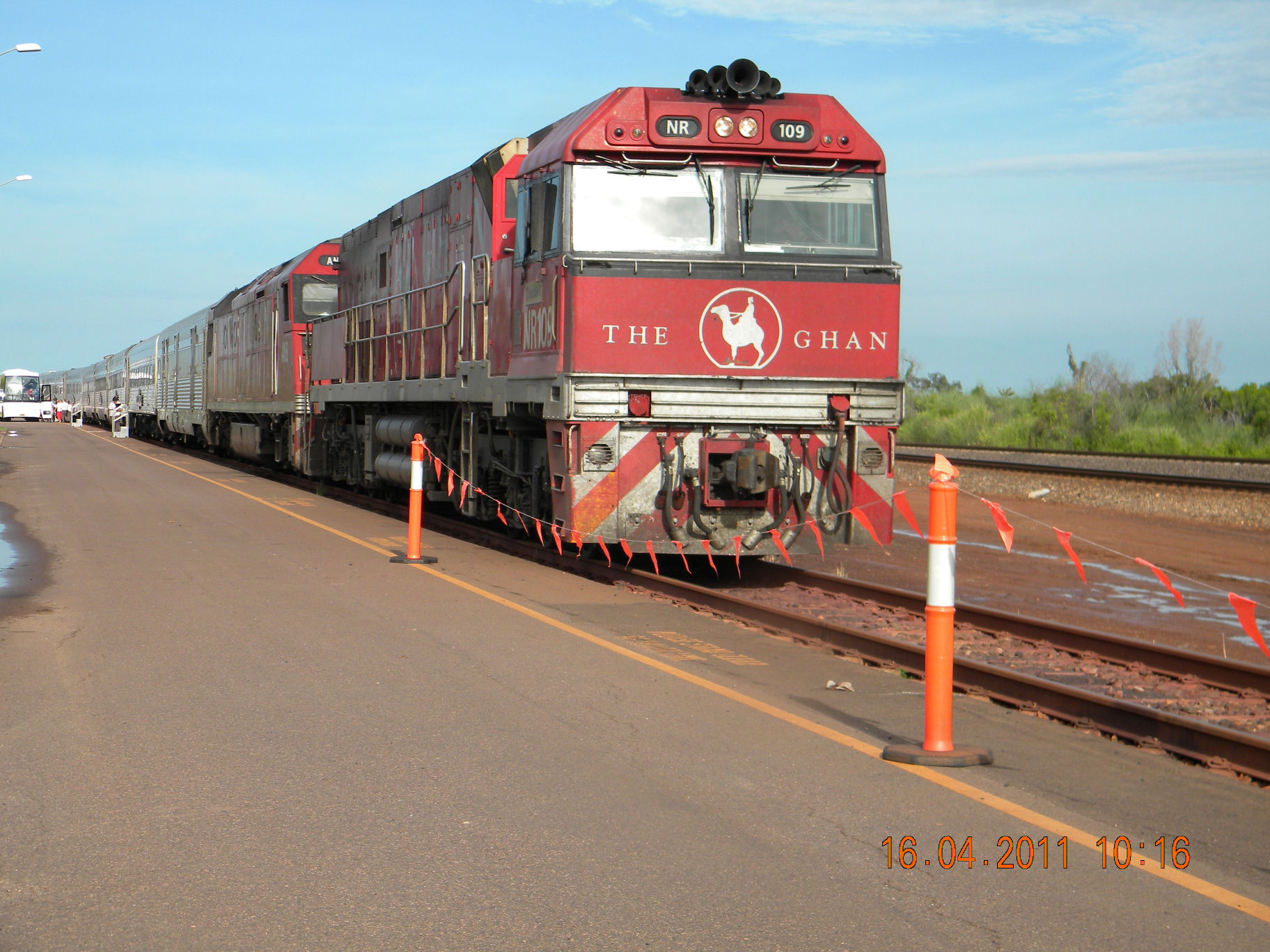
NR109 in The Ghan's MK I livery

When National Rail commenced operations in April 1993, it inherited a diverse collection of rolling stock and locomotives from various operators to operate interstate freight services in Australia. The fleet included locomotives of mixed age and power, leased from FreightCorp, V/Line and Australian National.

In September 1995, National Rail awarded a contract to A Goninan & Co for 80 locomotives, which later became 120. NR1–NR60 were built at Broadmeadow, and NR61–NR120 were constructed at Bassendean. The frames were built at Hexham and the bogies at Goninan's Landsdowne Engineering subsidiary in Taree.

The first locomotive to be completed was NR61, which was trialled on 18 September 1996, between Midland and Jumperkine. The first Broadmeadow-built unit ran on 23 September 1996. The early units were delivered without National Rail branding or logos, but later locomotives were delivered in the full livery. Testing was carried out on the NSW Main Northern line between Werris Creek and Maitland, using ballast wagons and 442 class locomotives, in dynamic braking mode, as dynamic loads. Each locomotive was required to accumulate 10,000 kilometres (6,200 mi) of trouble-free running before being accepted.

As part of its contract, A Goninan & Co was required to maintain the fleet. A depot was built alongside the Newport to Sunshine railway in the western Melbourne suburb of Spotswood to cater for this. Pacific National announced in September 2022 that the company had committed more than A$160 million towards the overhauling of the company's NR class units for East – West Intermodal traffic.

== Entry to service ==
With the arrival of the NR class, the V/Line C class (which were owned by National Rail) and relatively new EL class were withdrawn and stored. Once all 120 units were delivered, National Rail retained the AN, BL and DL class locomotives, along with thirteen 81 class and several hired G class. The new locomotives were placed on time sensitive trains first.

When first delivered, the NR class were banned from running in New South Wales by the Environment Protection Authority due to excessive noise when under dynamic braking, but the ban was lifted after further testing. The class could also not lead on the Victorian standard gauge network due to the lack of suitable radio equipment. In later years NR76 to NR98 were provided with V/Line Section Authority System equipment to work the Western standard gauge line, while NR1 to NR13 and NR61 to NR72 were fitted with V/Line radios to operate on the Victorian North East line.

== Notable accidents ==
On 25 May 2006, NR33 was involved in a level crossing incident in Lismore, being the third locomotive on Adelaide to Melbourne freight service 4AM3, behind DL40 and NR52. A truck drove into the side of the NR during low visibility conditions and the subsequent accident saw 41 freight wagons of the train land on top of NR33. The locomotive was written off afterwards.

On 21 April 2016, train 3MP5 derailed near Rawlinna in Western Australia. The two locomotives, NR34 and NR50, were badly damaged, but both were rebuilt and returned to service in late 2016 and mid 2017 respectively.

On 24 December 2019, 7MP5 hauled by NR80/NR59 collided with the rear of 2K66 Watco/CBH grain train, at Jumperkine, Western Australia, which resulted in a driver fatality. NR59 was later forwarded back to Melbourne, while NR80 was rebuilt at UGL Bassendean, being released as NR122 during early 2021.

On 31 December 2023, emergency services were called to the Barrier Highway after train 7SP5 with NR41/NR79 collided with a truck. The crash caused the deaths of both train drivers. The truck driver was uninjured. Both locomotives were destroyed and were scrapped during the clean up of the site.

== Features ==
The NR Class introduced many new features. These were the first locomotives in Australia to have "variable horsepower", which meant that the power output of the engine had three different settings, making the NR class the most fuel-efficient locomotives in Australia. They have GE 7FDL-16 engines, with power levels of 2,850 hp (2,130 kW), 3,560 hp (2,650 kW) or 4,020 hp (3,000 kW), mass of 132 t (130 long tons; 146 short tons), a Co-Co wheel arrangement and a maximum speed of 115 km/h (71 mph). They can hold 12,500 L (3,300 U.S. gal) of fuel.

The NR Class cab was designed taking into consideration the results of an extended consultative process with the end users. This has resulted in a cab that has been well accepted. The layout of the control stand evolved from a British Rail Class 60 cab, and is substantially different from the more common AAR type I (stand) and Type II (desk) cabs.

The design is a long hood unit locomotive, with only one cab but two separate sets of controls within the cab, which allow it be driven either "A" or "B" end leading. This locomotive had to pass all tests, such as being able to shunt if required, drive "long end leading" if needed, and allow drivers to do checks on fuel, brakes, and sand. Despite the twin controls, operation of the class "B" end leading is avoided, with single NR classes being turned on turntables or rail triangles to ensure they face the correct way.
