= Australian National DL class =

Australian class of diesel-electric locomotives

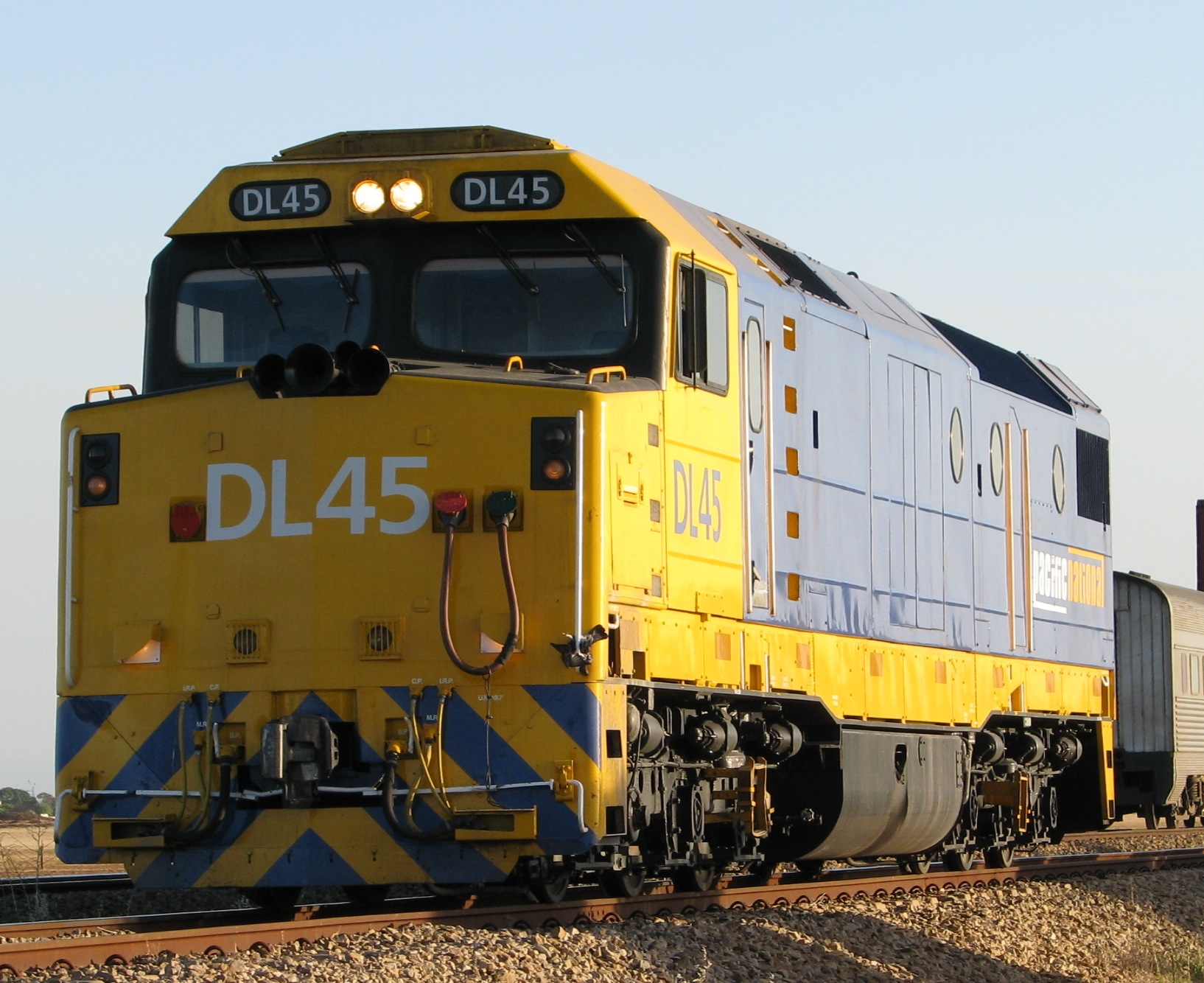
- DL45 in Pacific National livery at Two Wells in December 2007
Type and origin
- Power type: Diesel-electric
- Builder: Clyde Engineering, Kelso
- Serial number: 88-1244 to 88-1255; 88-1267 to 88-1269
- Model: EMD AT42C
- Build date: 1988–1990
- Total produced: 15
Specifications
- Configuration
  - UIC: Co-Co
- Gauge: 1,435 mm (4 ft 8 1/2 in) standard gauge
- Trucks: Tri-mount
- Bogies: Tri-mount
- Length: 19.67 m (64.5 ft)
- Loco weight: 121 t
- Fuel type: Diesel
- Fuel capacity: 8,200 L (1,800 imp gal)
- Prime mover: EMD 12-710G3A
- Engine type: Two-stroke V12 diesel
- Displacement: 8,520 cu in (140 L)
- Traction motors: 6 x EMD D87
- Cylinders: 12
- Cylinder size: 710 cu in (11.6 L)
- Transmission: Yes
- MU working: Yes
- Train heating: No
- Loco brake: Westinghouse air brake, Independent air brake, Dynamic brake
- Train brakes: Air
- Safety systems: Driver vigilance
Performance figures
- Maximum speed: 153 km/h (95 mph)
- Power output: 3,030 hp (2,260 kW)
- Tractive effort: • Starting 370 kN (83,179 lb_{f})
Career
- Operators: Pacific National
- Number in class: 15
- Numbers: DL36–DL50
- Delivered: 1988
- First run: February 1988
- Last run: August 2023
- Current owner: Pacific National
- Disposition: 3 stored 12 scrapped

The DL class are a class of diesel locomotives built by Clyde Engineering, Kelso for Australian National between 1988 and 1990. All units are stored as of 1 September 2023.

== History ==
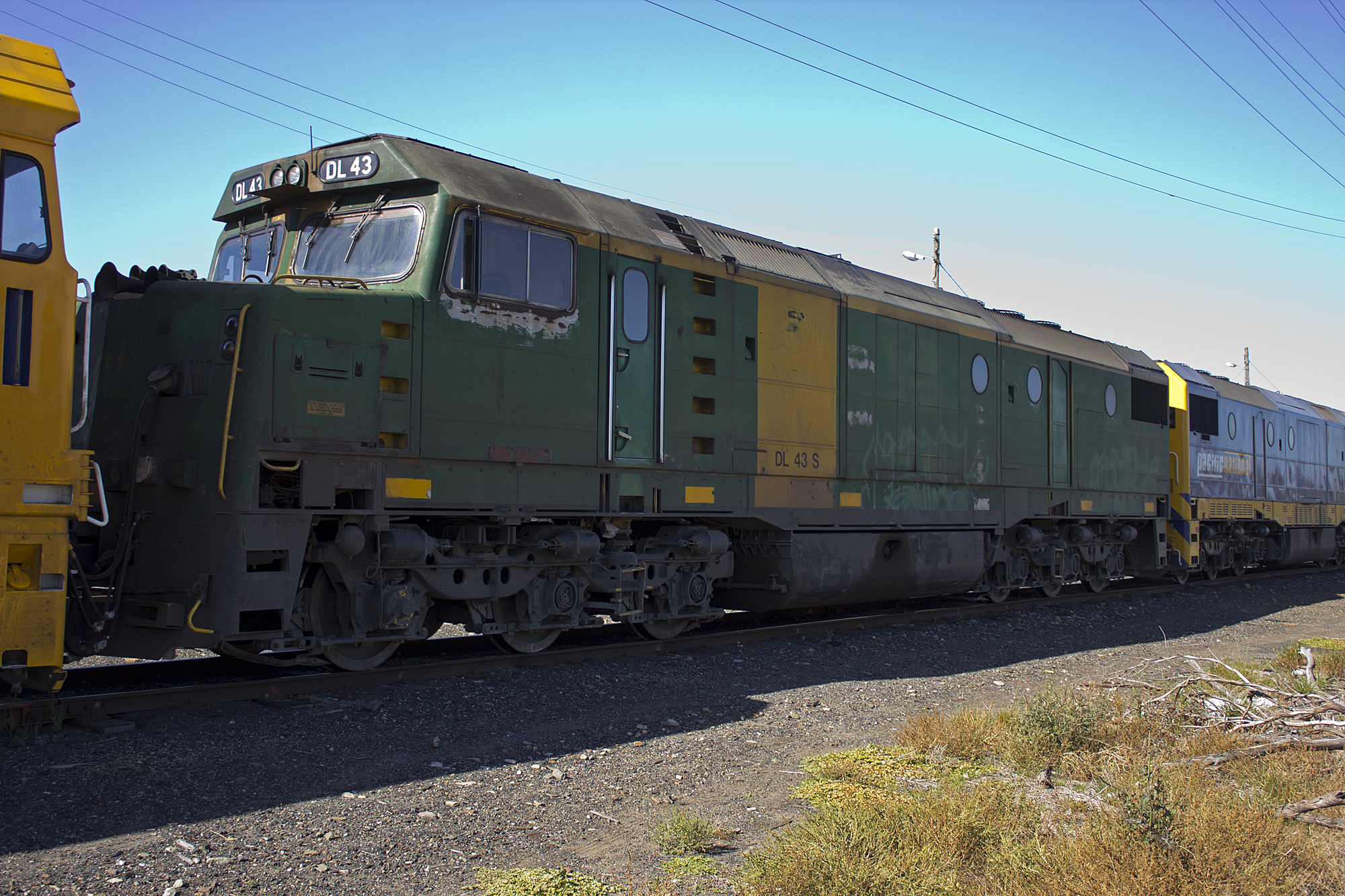
DL43 in Australian National Green and Yellow at Junee in April 2012

DL47 in National Rail Orange and Gray in January 2008

The first of the 15 commenced trials between Clyde Engineering's, Kelso plant and Lithgow in February 1988. The last was delivered in February 1990. They were used on Australian National's standard gauge network on Freight and Passenger traffic from Broken Hill to Adelaide, Alice Springs and Kalgoorlie. In 1995, all 15 were transferred with Australian National's interstate operations to National Rail.

In January 1996, DL37 was destroyed in the Hines Hill train collision. In June 1999, National Rail began operating blue metal trains in New South Wales from Dunmore to Cooks River and in November 1999, from Marulan to Port Kembla both with DLs.

All were included in the sale of National Rail to Pacific National in February 2002. As of January 2014, operational class members were being used on Pacific National freight services in New South Wales, Victoria and South Australia and as second locomotives on the Indian Pacific between Sydney to Adelaide. DL36 had been in storage at Port Augusta since at least 2008 and was cut up during 2018.

From May 2016, the class were no longer used as banking locomotives in the Adelaide Hills after being replaced by 82 class and G class locomotives. During the month, DL47 ran as part of light engine movement D171 from Enfield Yard to Lithgow with 8151 leading stored locos X50, DL47, X49 & G519. DL42 & DL45 also ran on light engine D171 on 25 May heading to Lithgow from Enfield Yard with 8162 leading X48, DL42, S306 & DL45. On 1 December 2016, 8129 lead DL45, DL44, DL50 and DL42 on a light engine movement to Port Kembla for reactivation work for grain haulage. The class were used in South Australia on grain workings during 2018 and 2019, and since 2021 were found in the Werris Creek area on grain services from Western and Northwestern NSW to the port of Newcastle.

In August 2023, DL41, DL43 and DL44 were placed into storage at Werris Creek, leaving all of the remaining class members DL38-47 & DL49-50 stored at both Werris Creek and Lithgow.

A number of the remaining DLs at Werris Creek commenced scrapping from September 2026.

== Status table ==
Key:	In service	Stored	Preserved	Rebuilt	Under overhaul	Scrapped

Locomotive	Named	Entered service	Owner	Livery	Withdrawn/Scrapped	Status
DL36	Peter Morris	Feb 1988	Pacific National	Australian National green & yellow	November 1997	Scrapped
DL37		May 1988	National Rail	Australian National green & yellow	January 1996	Scrapped
DL38		May 1988	Pacific National	Pacific National blue & yellow	November 2026	Scrapped (Werris Creek)
DL39		Jul 1988	Pacific National	Pacific National blue & yellow		Stored (Lithgow)
DL40		Aug 1988	Pacific National	Pacific National blue & yellow		Stored (Lithgow)
DL41		Sep 1988	Pacific National	Pacific National blue & yellow	September 2026	Scrapped (Werris Creek)
DL42		Nov 1988	Pacific National	Pacific National blue & yellow	October 2026	Scrapped (Werris Creek)
DL43		Dec 1988	Pacific National	Australian National green & yellow	October 2026	Scrapped (Werris Creek)
DL44		Dec 1988	Pacific National	National Rail orange & grey	October 2026	Scrapped (Werris Creek)
DL45		Mar 1989	Pacific National	Pacific National blue & yellow	September 2026	Scrapped (Werris Creek)
DL46		May 1989	Pacific National	Pacific National blue & yellow	September 2026	Scrapped (Werris Creek)
DL47		Jul 1989	Pacific National	Pacific National blue & yellow	September 2026	Scrapped (Werris Creek)
DL48		Aug 1989	Pacific National	Australian National green & yellow	February 2020	Scrapped
DL49		Nov 1989	Pacific National	National Rail orange & grey	October 2026	Scrapped (Werris Creek)
DL50		Feb 1990	Pacific National	Pacific National blue & yellow		Stored (Werris Creek)
