= Jumperkine, Western Australia =

Jumperkine
- Interactive map of Jumperkine
- Coordinates: 31°42′55.8″S 116°04′52.4″E
- Country: Australia
- State: Western Australia
- LGA: City of Swan
- Established: 1966

Government
  - State electorate: Swan Hills
  - Federal division: Durack
- Postcode: 6084

Jumperkine

General information
- System: Siding
- Owner: Arc Infrastructure
- Operator: Aurizon; Watco Companies; Pacific National; SCT Logistics
- Line: Eastern
- Distance: 51 kilometres (32 mi) from Perth
- Tracks: 4

Other information
- Status: Unstaffed

History
- Opened: 1966
Location

Jumperkine is a railway siding at the 41 km (25.5 mi) peg of the dual gauge Avon Valley line on the Eastern Railway between Millendon (towards Perth) and Moondyne (towards Toodyay) in Western Australia.

It is named after nearby Jumperkine Hill, close to where the Brockman River discharges into the Avon River. The siding at Jumperkine was opened in 1966, the preceding siding is Millendon Junction and the succeeding siding is Moondyne.

== Accidents ==
A derailment of No. 1304 Goods train in March 1980 resulting in several grain hopper wagons tipping over.

Grain train 3K26 collided with a track closed warning device on 29 September 2015, when it failed to stop at a station limits sign, endangering repair crews who were relaying a section of track, the ATSB categorised the incident as serious, but no injuries occurred.

On 24 December 2019 two NR class diesel-electric locomotives, No. 80 and No. 59 collided with a grain train resulting in the death of one of the drivers. The accident was assessed by the Australian Transport Safety Bureau (ATSB) to have been partially caused by driver fatigue as outlined in their final report released on 15 February 2024.
