= Hines Hill train collision =

Head-on railway accident in Western Australia

Details
- Date: 14 January 1996
- Location: Hines Hill, Western Australia
- Country: Australia
- Operator: National Rail Corporation
- Incident type: Collision
- Cause: Signal passed at danger

Statistics
- Trains: 2
- Deaths: 2

On the Eastern Goldfields Railway on 14 January 1996 at Hines Hill, Western Australia, two trains entered a passing loop simultaneously in opposing directions, although signals at the end of the passing loop were correctly showing red for stop. They subsequently collided with each other. Two people were killed in the collision.

== Overview ==
The trains involved were National Rail Corporation's 5SP5 intermodal Sydney to Perth freighter, and Westrail's 7025 Perth to Kalgoorlie freighter.

The National Rail train in one direction misjudged the stop, and went past the red signal, hitting the last wagons of the Westrail train. These wagons were tankers containing diesel which burst into flames, destroying the train data recorders that might have explained what speed the train was travelling at. Locomotive AN10 was derailed. The driver and a teenage guest passenger were killed. Another person received severe injuries. National Rail locomotives AN10 and DL37 were written off due to being damaged beyond repair. A relay control room which was close to the fire was also destroyed.

The collision happened at night, and there were no distance boards which might have helped the driver of the NR train judge the distance to the stop signal showing red.

== Aftermath ==
In June 1998, Westrail was fined $95,000 with $85,000 in costs. An appeal heard in the Supreme Court of Western Australia set aside the original conviction and Westrail was awarded $23,000 in costs.

The signalling was later altered to prevent trains entering the passing loop simultaneously.

The collision illustrates the hazard of having passing loops only just long enough to hold the two trains. If the loop had been longer, the safety distance from the red departure signal to the fouling point with the arriving train would have been larger and the other train would have cleared the single line section, so avoiding the collision by some vital seconds.

=== Loop lengthening ===
Since the collision, the passing loop at Hines Hill has been lengthened for longer 1,800 m trains. The loop is now 2,304 m long, which is considerably longer than the normal longest train. The extra distance provides both a safety margin and allows a train entering the loop to clear the single line at a higher speed. It is not known if the simultaneous arrival signalling has been restored.

== See also ==
- Railway accidents in Western Australia
