= Australian National Railways Commission =

Australian transport agency 1975–1998

- The logotype of the "AN" trade mark registered in 1980

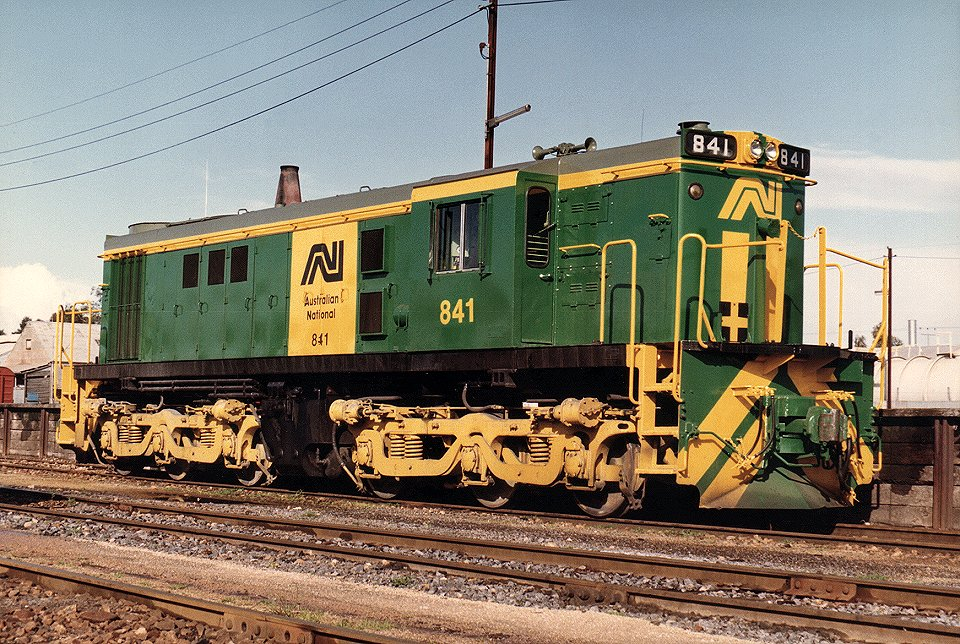
- An 830 class locomotive in the Australian National colour scheme at Mount Gambier in 1983
- Type: Statutory corporation
- Industry: Railways, freight, overland transport
- Predecessor: Commonwealth Railways; South Australian Railways; Tasmanian Government Railways
- Founded: 1 July 1975
- Defunct: 30 June 1998
- Successor: Australian Rail Track Corporation (infrastructure); Australian Southern Railroad & National Rail (freight); Great Southern Rail (passenger)
- Headquarters: Adelaide
- Area served: Northern Territory; South Australia; Western Australia; Tasmania
- Parent: Government of Australia
- Subsidiaries: AN Tasrail

The Australian National Railways Commission was a railway operator owned by the Australian Government that existed from 1975 until 1998. It traded as Australian National Railways (ANR) in its early years, before being rebranded as Australian National. AN was widely used as an acronym from 1980, the logotype being registered as a trade mark.

== History ==
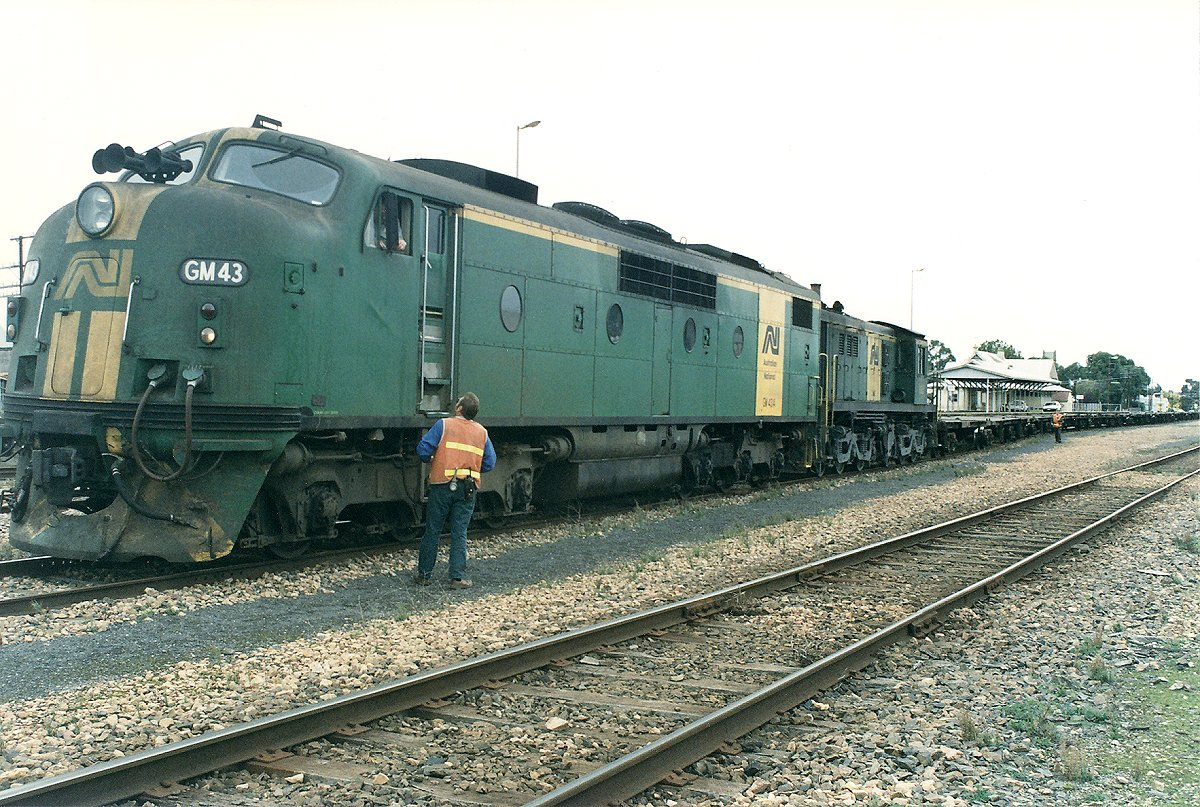
GM class and 830 class at Mount Gambier in April 1995

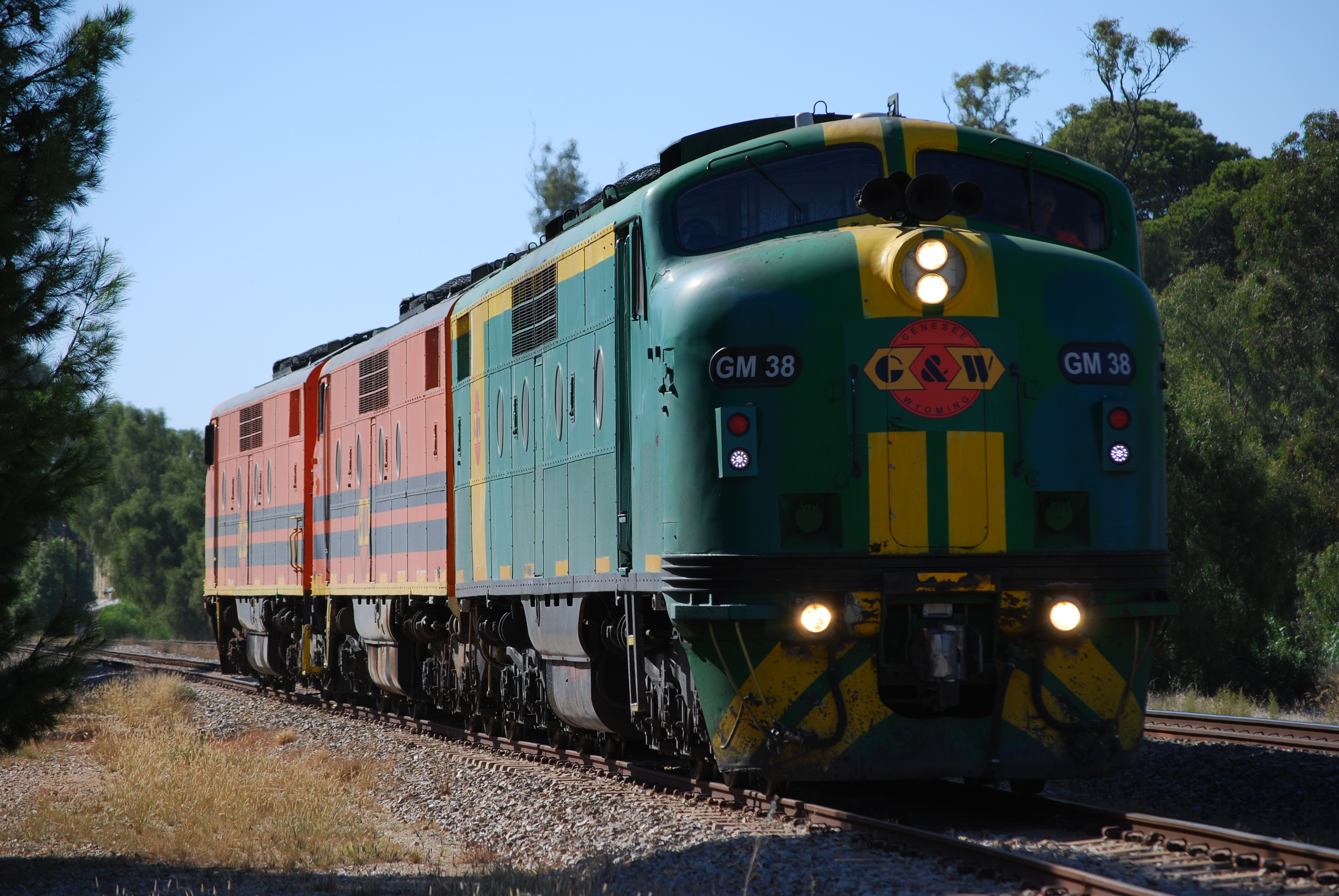
Genesee & Wyoming Australia GM class in Australian National livery in April 2008

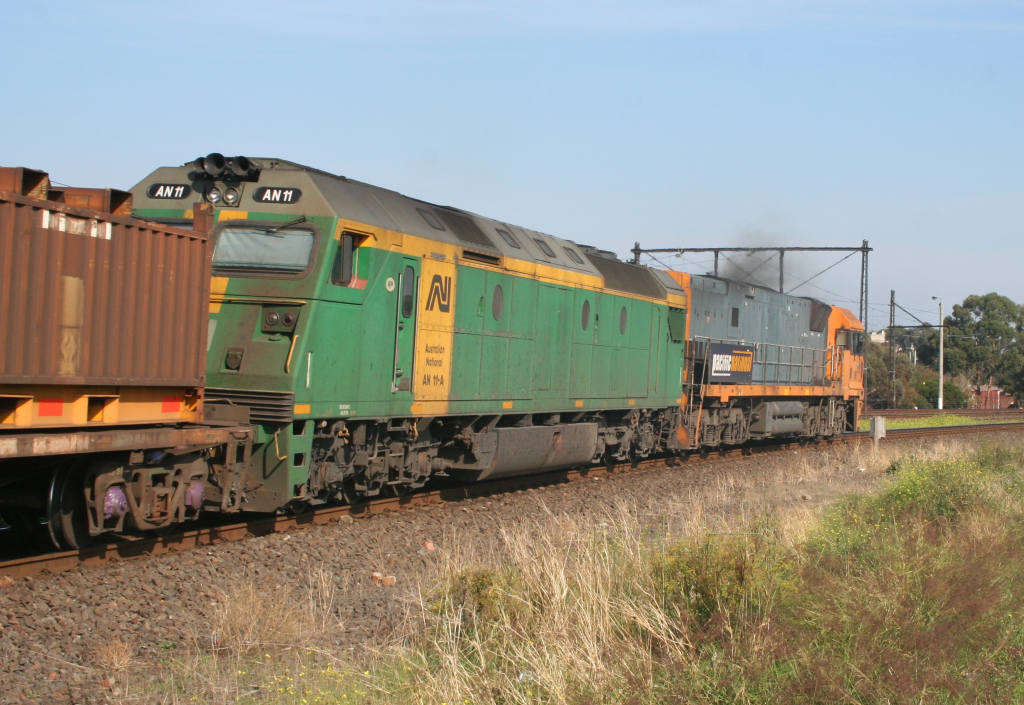
Pacific National AN class in Australian National livery in Newport in May 2008

The commission was established following an election commitment made during the 1972 federal election by the Whitlam federal government. The Whitlam government invited the state governments to hand over their railway systems to the federal government. On 1 July 1975, the Australian National Railways Commission took over responsibility for the operations of the federal government owned Commonwealth Railways and branded itself Australian National Railways.

The state governments of South Australia and Tasmania, where the railway systems were deeply in debt, accepted. During the next two years, following discussions between the two states and the federal government, new staffing and operating agreements enabled the transfer in March 1978 of all South Australian Railways services (except the Adelaide metropolitan passenger network) and all Tasmanian Government Railways services to Australian National Railways, the latter being branded AN Tasrail.

Overnight, Australian National Railways went from an organisation with 4000 employees operating routes of just over 2000 kilometres (1200 miles) – 20 per cent of Australia's rail network – to just over 12,000 employees operating 7890 km (4900 mi). Reflecting the persistence of three mainline gauges that had afflicted Australia since 1865, the total comprised 2395 km (1488 mi) of 1600 mm (5 ft 3 in) broad gauge, 2812 km (1747 mi) of 1435 mm (4 ft 8 1/2 in) standard gauge and 2683 km (1667 mi) of narrow gauge track. (Note: The narrow gauge tracks included 851 km (529 mi) in Tasmania and, in South Australia, the remaining northernmost 948 km (589 mi) section of the Central Australia Railway, between Marree and Alice Springs, 748 km (465 mi) on the isolated Port Lincoln Division, and two short lines in South Australia's Mid North, radiating from Peterborough and Gladstone.)

Australian National Railways was a corporation owned by the Australian government and, in 1978, the Fraser government made it clear it expected the organisation to achieve a financial break-even point during the next 10 years. That decision was unique in Australia's railway history because, with the exception of Commonwealth Railways, all the state systems were running at a loss, being financially supported by their respective governments. The commission appointed a professional engineer with overseas experience as general manager, which was a break from the traditional railway practice of making such appointments from within the organisations.

The commission's first corporate plan in 1979 set out six ways that the commission would ensure its survival. They were:

- concentrating its marketing drive on bulk traffic, inter-capital freight and major city freight
- seeking agreement to cease services where there is little or no demand for the services
- rationalisation of services and withdrawal of services not effectively demanded
- implement technological changes in all areas of railway operation particularly track maintenance
- acquire larger and more efficient locomotives and rolling stock to operate trains at maximum capacity
- pursue a vigorous policy directed towards staff reductions and more efficient use of manpower

In 1980, a delegation of senior staff, led by the general manager, visited North America to examine current railway practices. In Canada, the delegation had talks with the Canadian National Railway (which, like Australian National, was government owned) and the Canadian Pacific Railway. In the United States, contact was made with Chessie System and the Southern Pacific Railroad. The areas looked at included marketing and pricing, finance and planning, engineering, and staff training.

On 12 March 1980, a new green-and-yellow corporate identity was launched with GM1 being the first locomotive painted in the new livery.

In October 1980, a new standard gauge line from Tarcoola to Alice Springs was opened, replacing the narrow gauge Central Australia Railway which closed in December 1980. In December 1982, the Adelaide to Crystal Brook line reopened after being converted to standard gauge.

Ownership of the Queanbeyan to Canberra railway line was transferred to the New South Wales State Rail Authority in May 1985.

== Locomotives ==
Australian National Railways inherited the following diesel locomotive classes:

- Commonwealth Railways standard gauge: DE, GM, CL
- Commonwealth Railways narrow gauge: NC, NSU, NT, NJ
- South Australian Railways: 350, 500, 600, 700, 800, 830, 900, 930
- Tasmanian Government Railways: X, Y, Z, Za

Built new for Australian National were the AL, BL, DL, EL and AN classes all for standard gauge use.

Also purchased were five T class locomotives from V/Line in 1993 that were reclassed as CKs.

In 1986, a new computer system required the class leaders of the former South Australian Railways to be renumbered as the last member of the class, e.g. 600 became 607.

== Passenger services ==
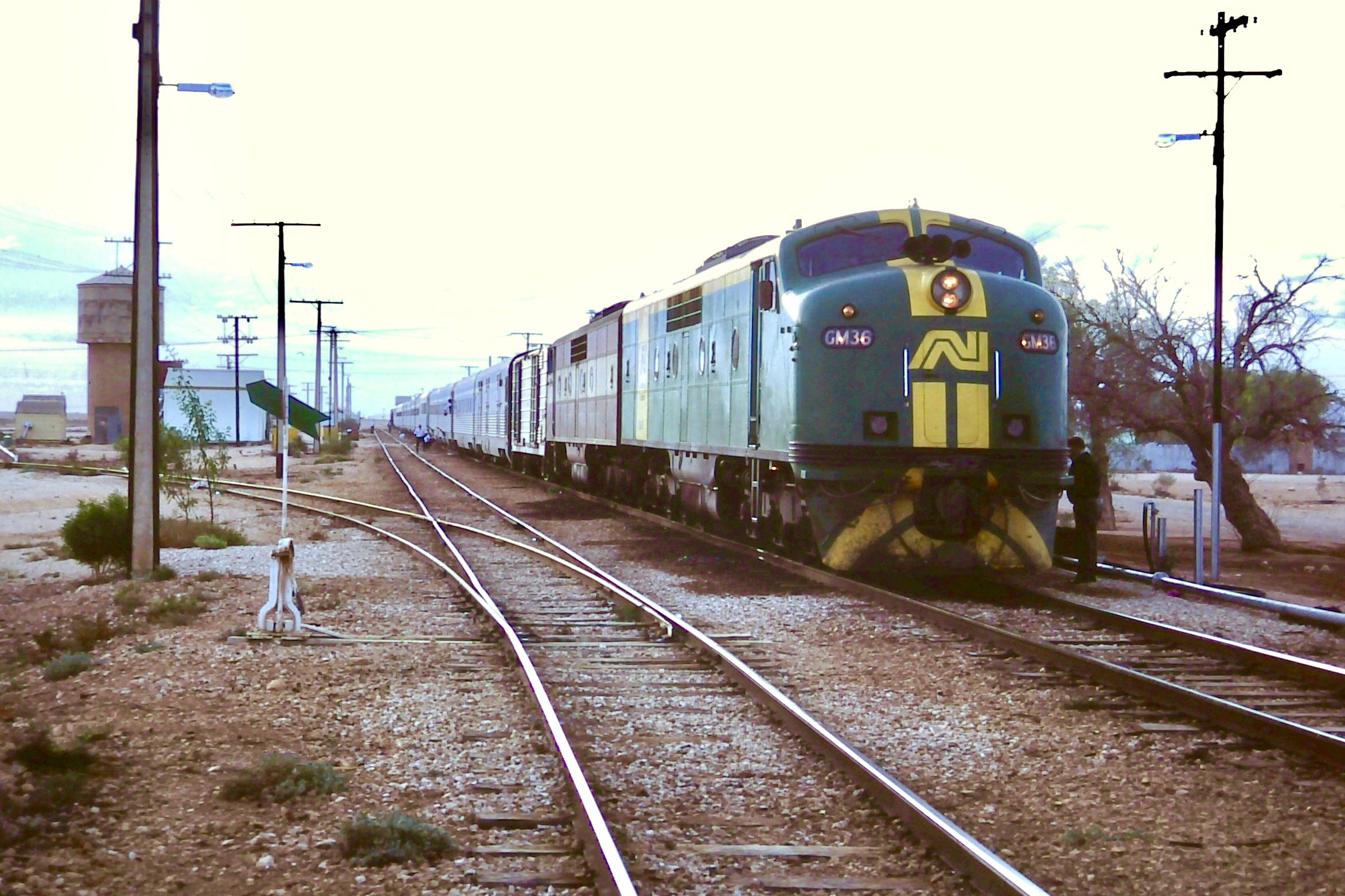
The Trans-Australian at Cook as a frosty dawn breaks in 1986. The train was headed by GM class diesel-electric locomotives GM36 and GM22.

Australian National operated country passenger services within South Australia, mainly using Bluebird railcars. They operated services to Burra, Gladstone, Mount Gambier, Port Pirie, Tailem Bend, Terowie (extended to Peterborough in 1970) and Victor Harbor. All of these services were withdrawn by 1990. It also operated The Ghan. It also operated the Indian Pacific in partnership with the Public Transport Commission and Westrail and The Overland in partnership with the Victorian Railways. It took over the running of these services in full in February 1993 and 1994 respectively.

Australian National also operated the Trans Australian until June 1991 and The Alice between November 1983 and mid-1988.

== Trailerail ==
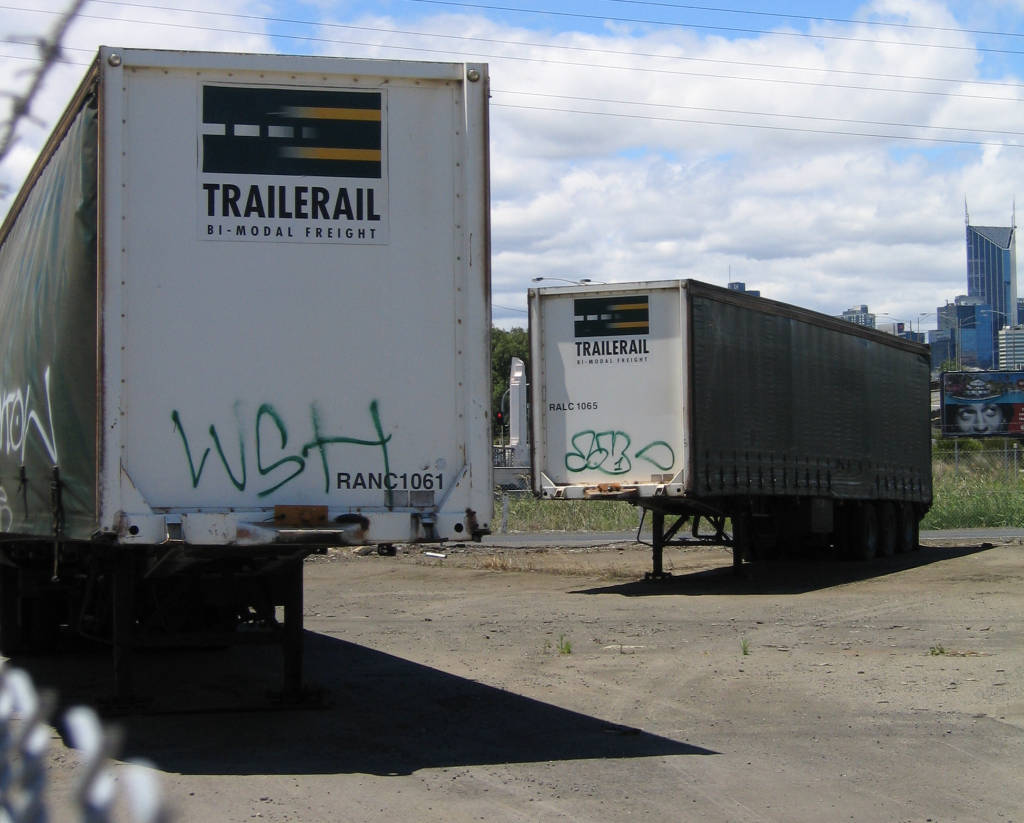
Australian National operated Roadrailers under the Trailerail brand

Australian National entered a joint venture with National Rail to operate Roadrailers under the Trailerail brand. In November 1994, the first service commenced operating between Adelaide and Perth followed in November 1995 by a service from Adelaide to Melbourne. In 1996, Australian National withdrew from the joint venture with National Rail taking over its share.

== Demise ==
Following the formation of National Rail, Australian National's interstate freight operations and rolling stock were transferred in 1994.

In November 1996, the federal government announced a major rail reform package that included the sale of Australian National.

On 1 November 1997, The Ghan, Indian Pacific and Overland passenger services were sold to Great Southern Rail, the South Australian intrastate services to Genesee & Wyoming Australia and AN Tasrail to the Australian Transport Network.

In July 1998, the railway infrastructure operated by Australian National's Track Access division, was transferred to the federal government owned Australian Rail Track Corporation.

In October 2000, following the resolution of outstanding issues relating to property and employee compensation, Australian National was wound up.
