= Australian National BL class =

Class of diesel locomotives

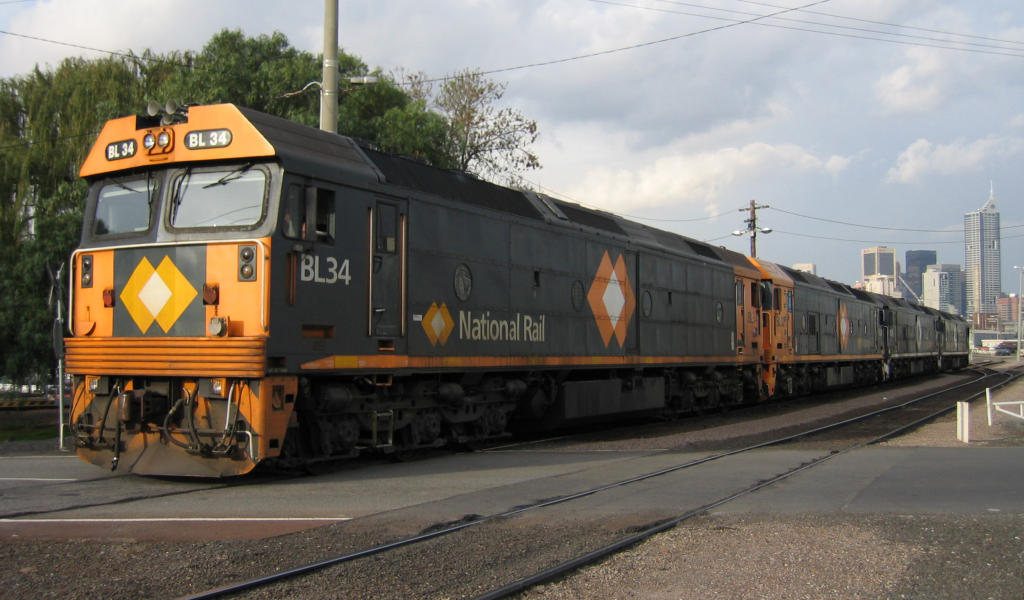
- Four BL class locomotives, two in National Rail livery, two in SteelLink livery
Type and origin
- Power type: Diesel-electric
- Builder: Clyde Engineering, Rosewater
- Serial number: 83-1010 to 83-1019
- Model: EMD JT26C-2SS
- Build date: 1983–1984
- Total produced: 10
Specifications
- Configuration
  - UIC: Co-Co
- Gauge: 1,435 mm (4 ft 8 1/2 in) standard gauge 1,600 mm (5 ft 3 in)
- Length: 19.82 m (65 ft 0 in)
- Fuel type: Diesel
- Prime mover: EMD 16-645E3B
- Engine type: Two-stroke V16 diesel
- Aspiration: Turbocharged
- Cylinders: 16
Performance figures
- Power output: 3,300 horsepower (2,500 kilowatts)
Career
- Operators: Pacific National
- Number in class: 10
- Numbers: BL26–BL35
- Delivered: 1983
- First run: 1983
- Last run: 1984
- Current owner: Pacific National
- Disposition: 9 in service, 1 scrapped

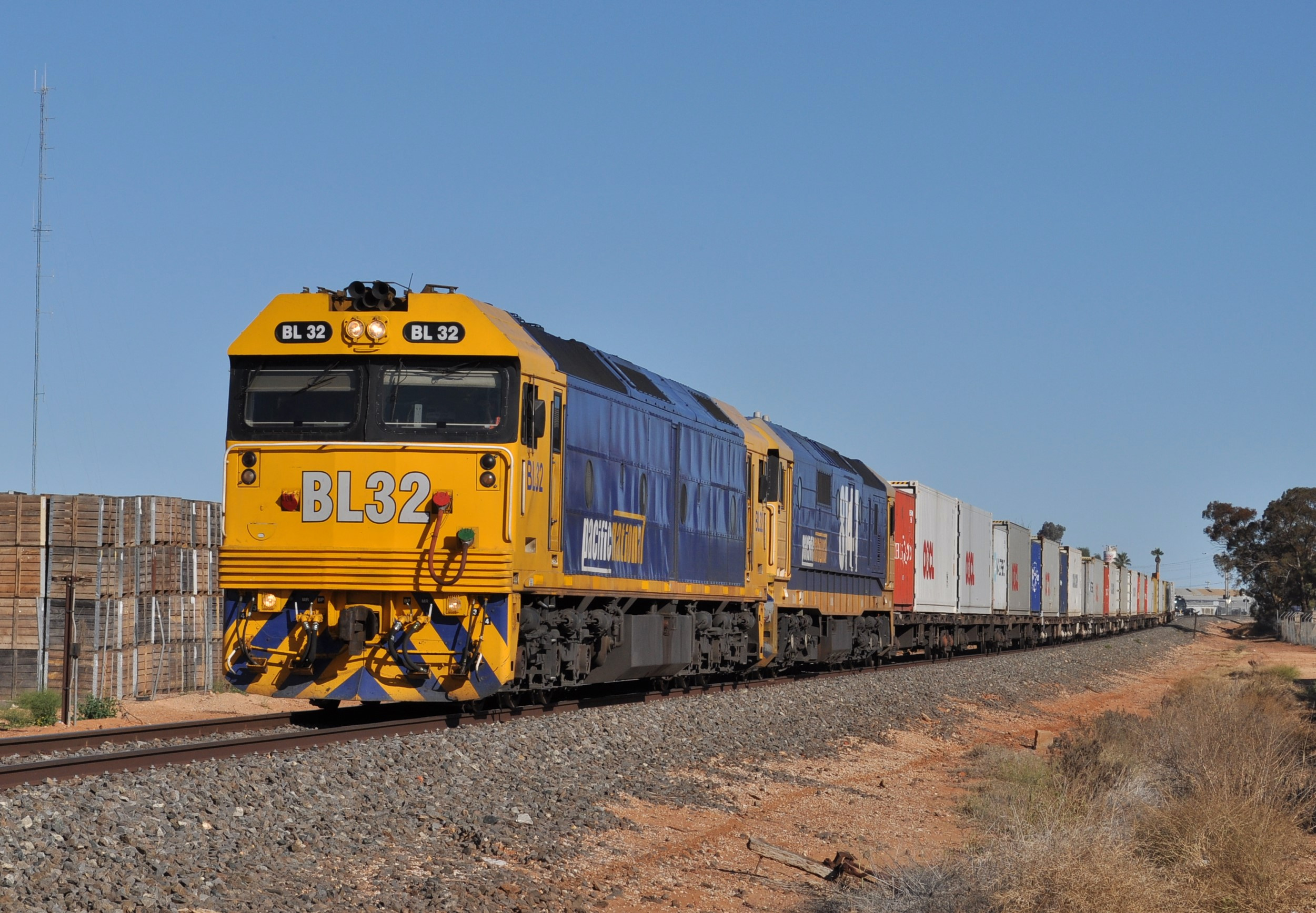
BL32 and 8141 lead a freight in Mildura in September 2020.

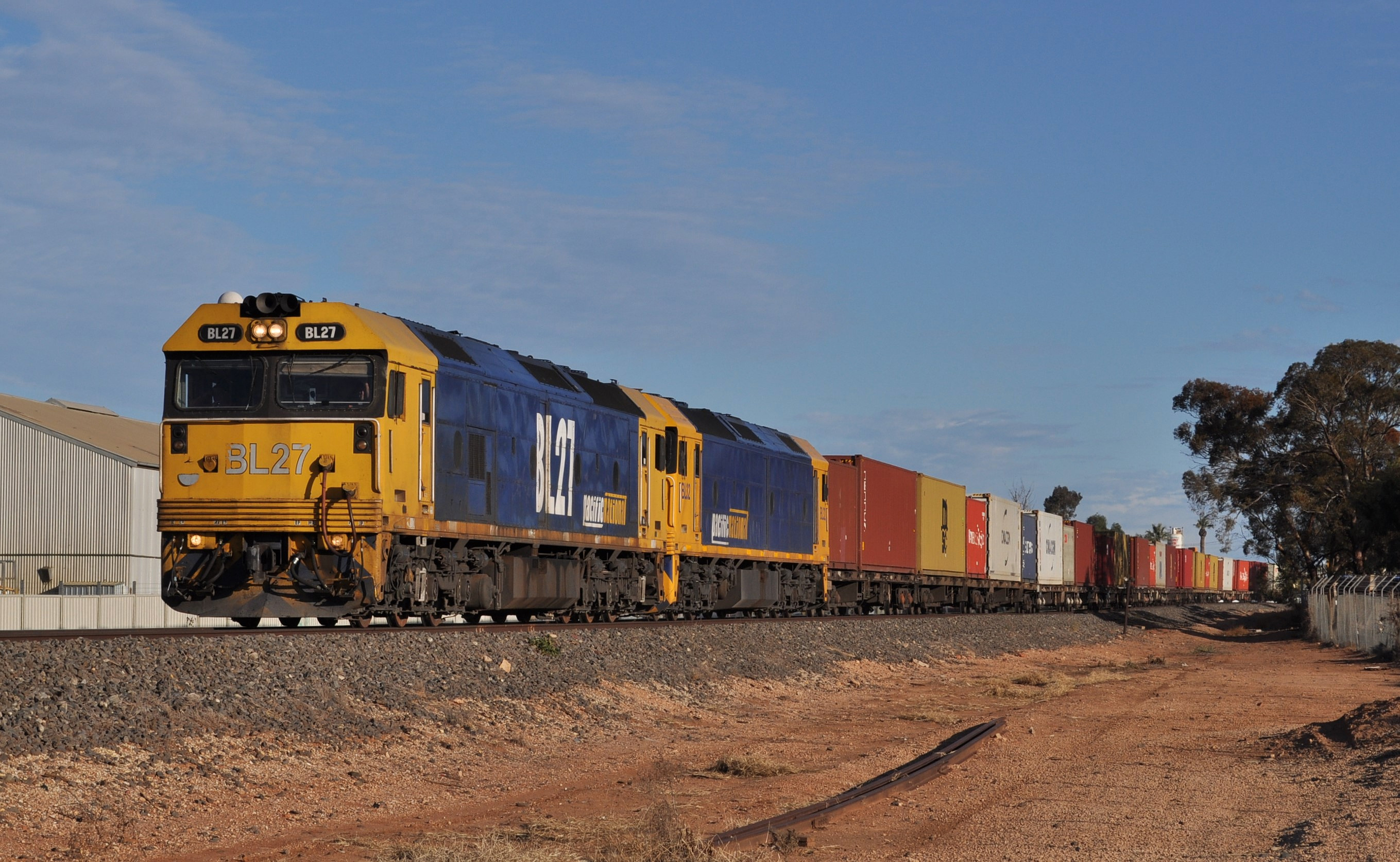
BL27 and BL32 on a freight in Mildura, in September 2020

The BL class are a class of diesel locomotives built by Clyde Engineering, Rosewater, for Australian National between 1983 and 1984. All but BL35 remain in service with Pacific National.

== History ==
In 1982, Australian National placed an order for with Clyde Engineering for 15 Electro-Motive Diesel JT26C-2SS locomotives (an evolution of the New South Wales 81 class locomotive), to be classed BL and numbered 26 through 40. Australian National only took delivery of the first 10, with the other five delivered to V/Line as their G class. The first five were delivered with standard gauge bogies, the last five with broad gauge bogies.

The 10 Australian National locomotives were transferred to National Rail and converted to standard gauge in 1995, following the conversion of the Adelaide to Melbourne line. In December 1996, they began to operate on services to Sydney and Newcastle. In September 1998, after being repainted into SteelLink livery by Rail Services Australia, Chullora, four were transferred back to the broad gauge to haul steel trains for BHP from Long Island to Dynon. For a period in the late 1990s, they were rostered to haul The Overland between Melbourne and Adelaide.,

As of June 2025, three were in service on the broad gauge, six on the standard gauge and one is in storage. All wear the Pacific National livery. BL35 suffered a fire which damaged the roof and was scrapped at Werris Creek in November 2026.
