= New South Wales 81 class locomotive =

Class of diesel locomotives

New South Wales 81 class
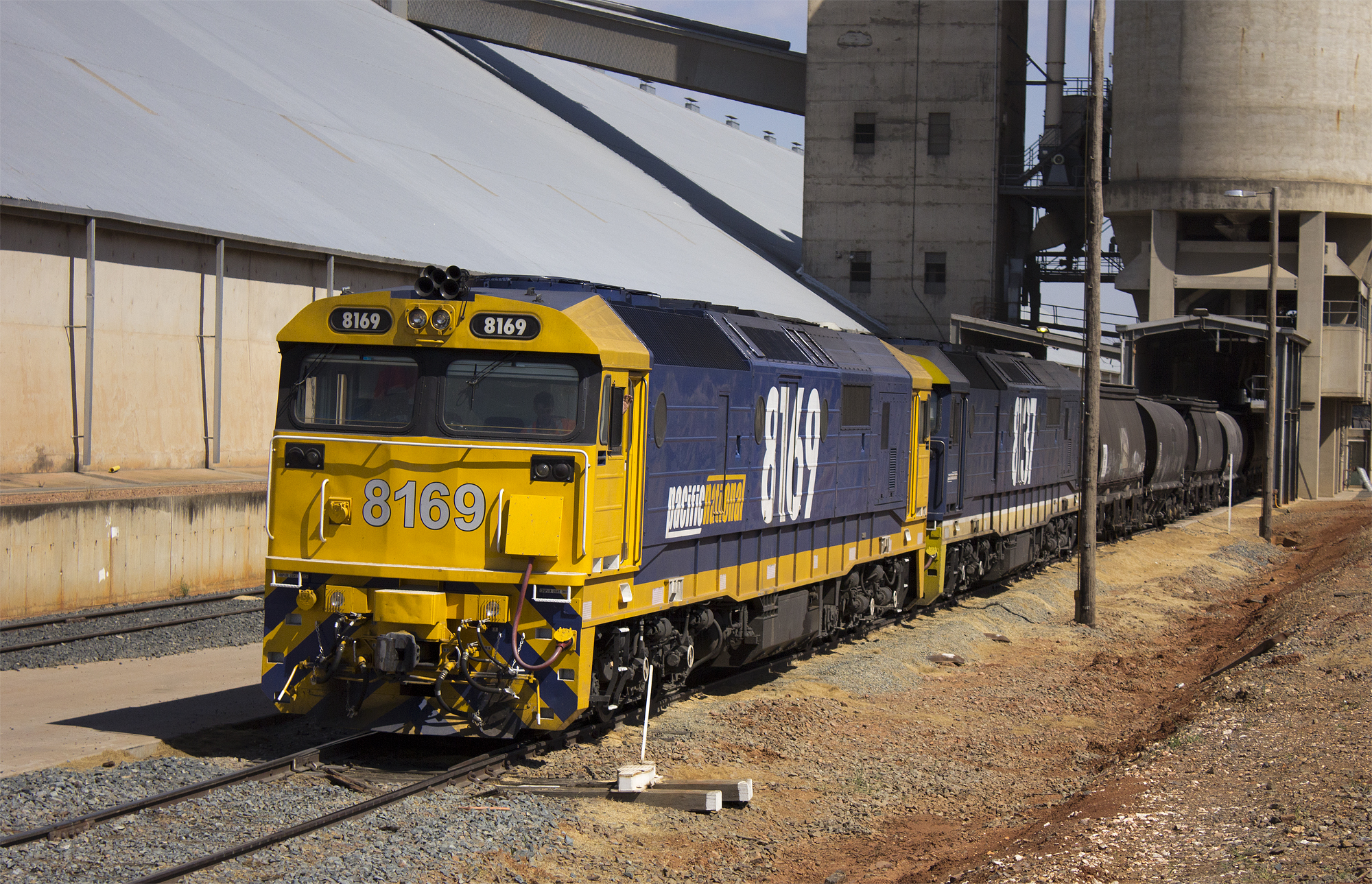
- Pacific National 8169 and 8137 at Temora in November 2011
Type and origin
- Power type: Diesel-electric
- Builder: Clyde Engineering, Kelso
- Serial number: 82-1020 to 82-1034; 83-1035 to 83-1058; 84-1059 to 84-1082; 85-1083 to 85-1099; 91-1278 to 91-1281
- Model: EMD JT26C-2SS
- Build date: 1982–1985, 1991
- Total produced: 84
Specifications
- Configuration
  - UIC: Co-Co
- Gauge: 1,435 mm (4 ft 8 1/2 in) standard gauge
- Wheel diameter: 1,016 mm (40 in)
- Length: Over headstocks: 19.760 m (64 ft 10 in), Over coupler pulling faces: 21.156 m (69 ft 4 7/8 in)
- Width: 2,968 mm (9 ft 8 7/8 in)
- Height: 4,267 mm (14 ft 0 in)
- Axle load: 21.5 t (21.2 long tons; 23.7 short tons)
- Loco weight: 129 t (127.0 long tons; 142.2 short tons)
- Fuel type: Diesel
- Fuel capacity: 6,600 L (1,450 imp gal; 1,740 US gal)
- Lubricant cap.: 920 L (202 imp gal; 243 US gal)
- Coolant cap.: 1,117 L (246 imp gal; 295 US gal)
- Sandbox cap.: 0.475 m^{3} (16.8 cu ft)
- Prime mover: EMD 16-645E3B
- RPM range: 318–904
- Engine type: Two-stroke V16 diesel
- Aspiration: Turbocharged
- Alternator: EMD AR16
- Traction motors: EMD D77, 6 of
- Cylinders: 16
- Cylinder size: 229 mm × 254 mm (9.0 in × 10.0 in)
- Transmission: Electric
- MU working: Equipped
- Loco brake: Air And Dynamic Brake
- Train brakes: Air
- Safety systems: Deadman Switch
Performance figures
- Maximum speed: 115 km/h (71 mph)
- Power output: Gross: 2,610 kW (3,500 hp); For traction: 2,460 kW (3,300 hp)
- Tractive effort: Continuous: 337.00 kN (75,761 lbf) at 19.2 km/h (11.9 mph)
Career
- Operators: Pacific National
- Number in class: 84
- Numbers: 8101–8184
- Delivered: 1982
- First run: 29 October 1982
- Current owner: Pacific National
- Disposition: 83 in service, 1 scrapped

The 81 class are a class of diesel locomotives built by Clyde Engineering, Kelso for the State Rail Authority.

== History ==
Eighty 81 class locomotives were built by Clyde Engineering, Kelso between September 1982 and February 1986, to replace 1950s vintage 42 and 44 class locomotives as well as provide additional capacity. The first 42 were based at Broadmeadow Locomotive Depot to operate Hunter Valley coal trains, while the remaining 38 were mostly employed on the Main South line between Sydney and Albury, hauling both passenger and freight trains. The final 15 were equipped with V/Line radios and, from July 1986, operated through to Melbourne. The 81 class was an evolution of the Australian National AL class, and the V/Line G class and Australian National BL class were, in turn, developed from the 81 class.

In 1991, a further four units were built at Kelso, using many components from spares held. Following the delivery of the 90 class in 1994, the Broadmeadow-based units were released to replace older locomotives on other freight duties. That saw their sphere of operation extended to Brisbane and Broken Hill.

In the mid-1990s, some of the later locomotives were leased to National Rail. They were later exchanged for 13 of the earlier locomotives which were permanently transferred to National Rail for use around Australia as high-powered shunters. All were reunited when National Rail and FreightCorp were both sold to form Pacific National in February 2002.

In February 1999, 81s began operating in South Australia, when FreightCorp won a contract to haul brown coal on the Leigh Creek to Stirling North line from Leigh Creek to the Northern Power Station in Port Augusta.

As of February 2013, Pacific National operated 82, primarily in New South Wales. 8147 was written off following a derailment and fire near Forbes on 11 March 2007.

== Current Usage ==
Pacific National operates the majority of the class in NSW, on a variety of workings such as grain, cement, intermodal and aggregates. 13 members of the class, (8102, 8106, 8107, 8108, 8112, 8114, 8115, 8117, 8118, 8120, 8121, 8122 and 8143) are used in the intermodal division of PN, primarily as yard shunters but occasionally working intermodal trains. Many are assigned to specific yards, for example 8114 and 8122 to the Melbourne Freight Terminal in VIC and 8108 to Adelaide Parklands Terminal in SA.

In November 2023 PN started increasing the usage of 81 class locomotives in Victoria. None have been officially allocated to Victorian workings and are typically transferred to and from Southern NSW to run grain trains South of the border.

On 01/04/25 8150 was transferred to Qube.

In the first half of 2026, 8167 was significantly damaged in a collision at Clyde yard, when a runaway SSR-owned locomotives and containerised cement wagons struck the stationary 81 class. As of July it remains at Broadmeadow locomotive workshops with an uncertain future.

81 class horn

== Liveries ==
All units entered service in the SRA "candy" scheme, later being repainted into the Freight Rail scheme of navy, yellow and white. All units that passed to PN now wear the PN colours of blue and yellow, with a few variations. Intermodal division units 8102, 8108, 8112, 8114, 8115, 8120, 8121 and 8122 have small numbers in blue on the cab sides, rather than the large white numerals on the side of the car body. 8162 has a unique livery (previously also worn by 8103) with both the large and small numbers. Since 2022, 8103, 8130, 8137, 8161 and 8174 have been repainted a second time into PN colours, with white stars on the cab side at one end. 8110 and 8149 also received similar treatment after having had just the cabs repainted. 8130 and 8148 carry "RUOK" stickers on the side of the car body.
