= National Rail Corporation =

Former Australian railway operator

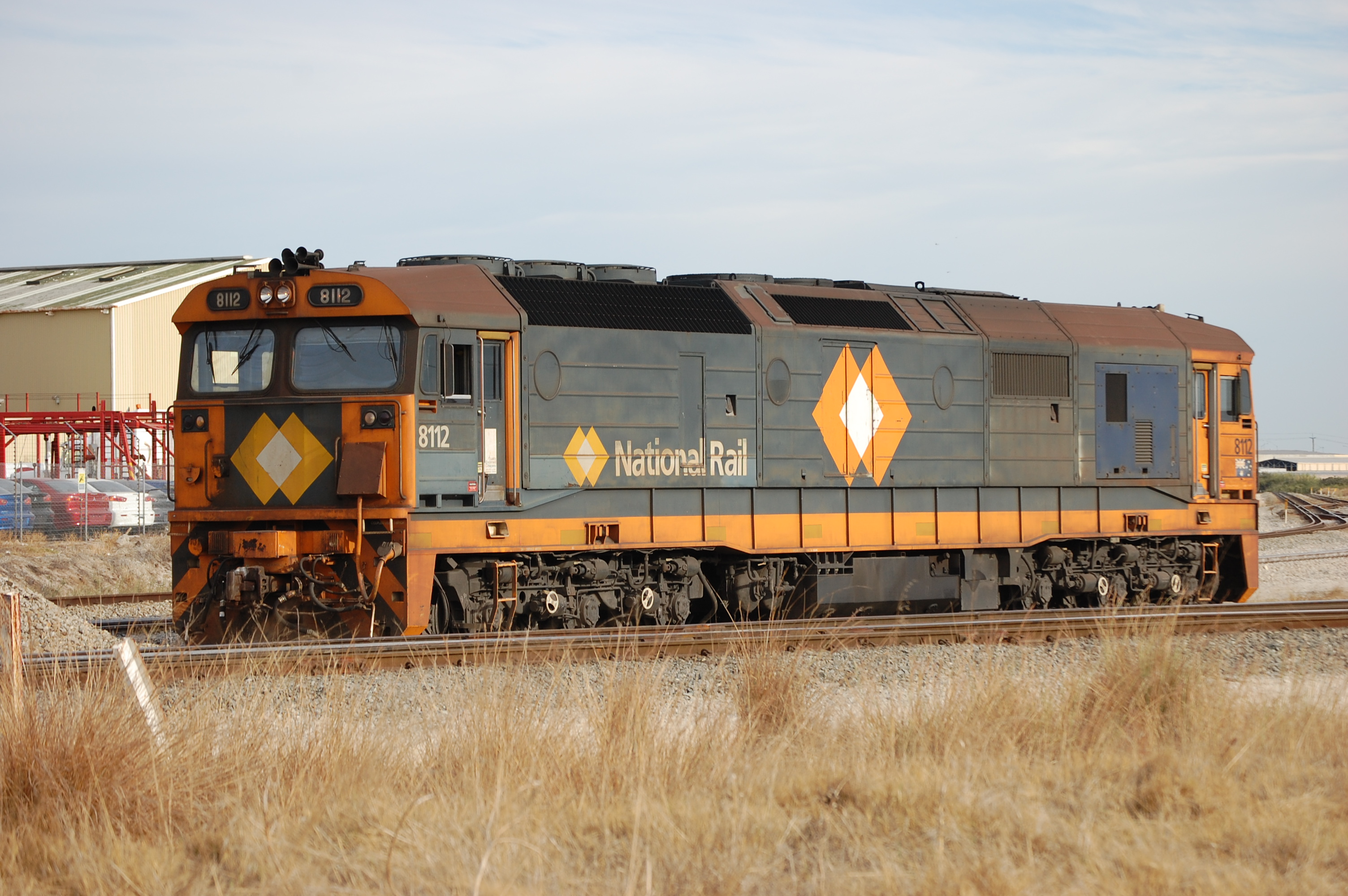
- 81 class at Kewdale in September 2009
- Industry: Railways operator
- Founded: February 1992
- Defunct: February 2002
- Successor: Pacific National
- Parent: Government of Australia; Government of New South Wales; Government of Victoria
- Divisions: Intermodal; SeaTrain; SteelLink; Trailerail

The National Rail Corporation was an Australian rail operator established by the Australian, New South Wales and Victorian governments in February 1992. In February 2002, National Rail was sold to a Patrick Corporation and Toll Holdings consortium and rebranded as Pacific National.

== History ==
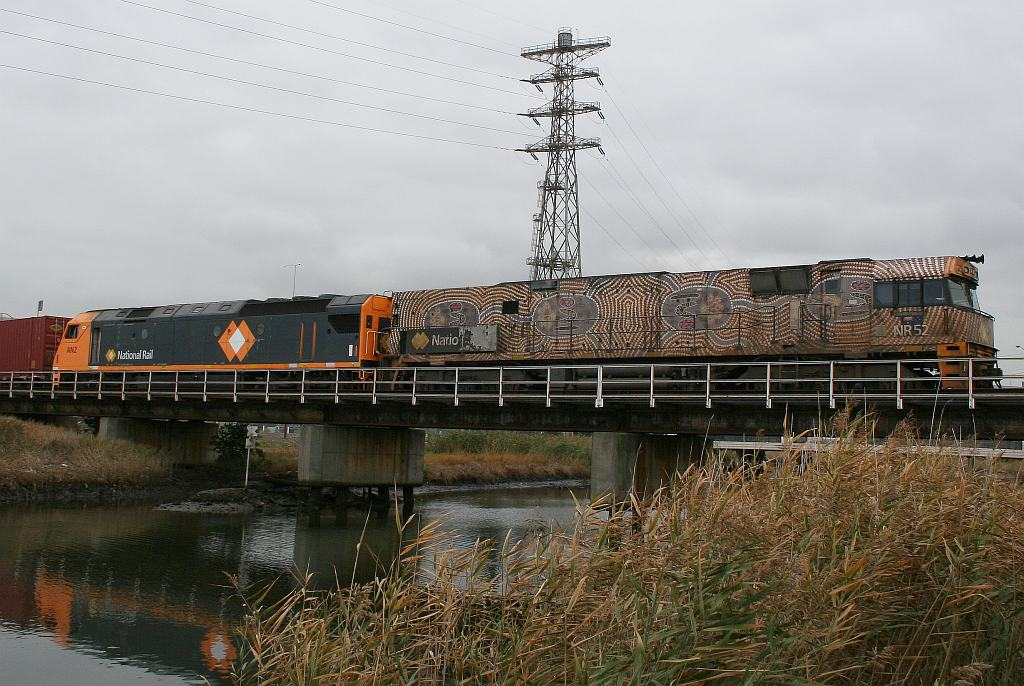
NR class and AN class in Melbourne in June 2006

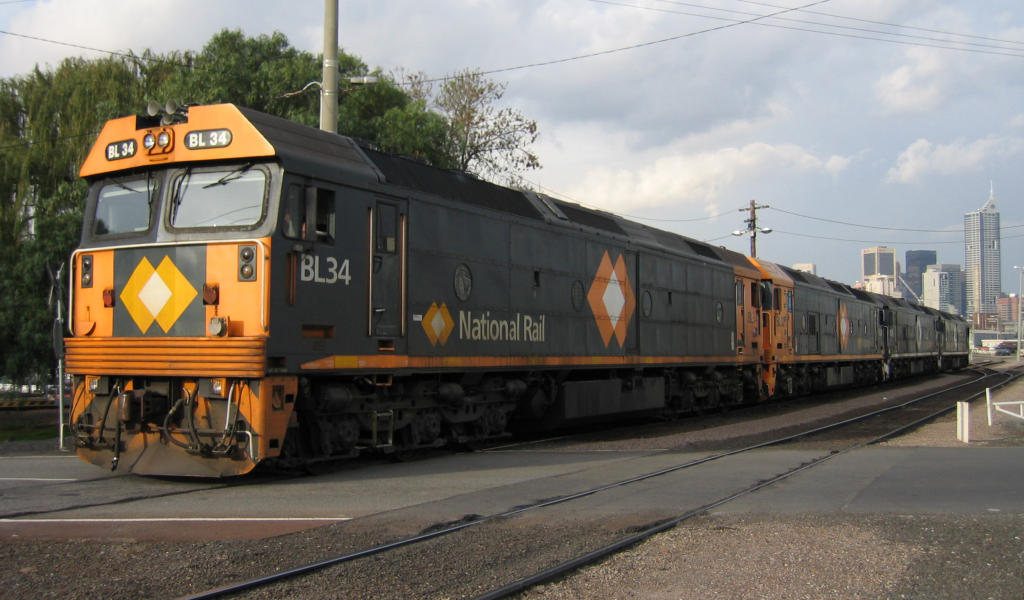
BL class locomotives in Melbourne in June 2006

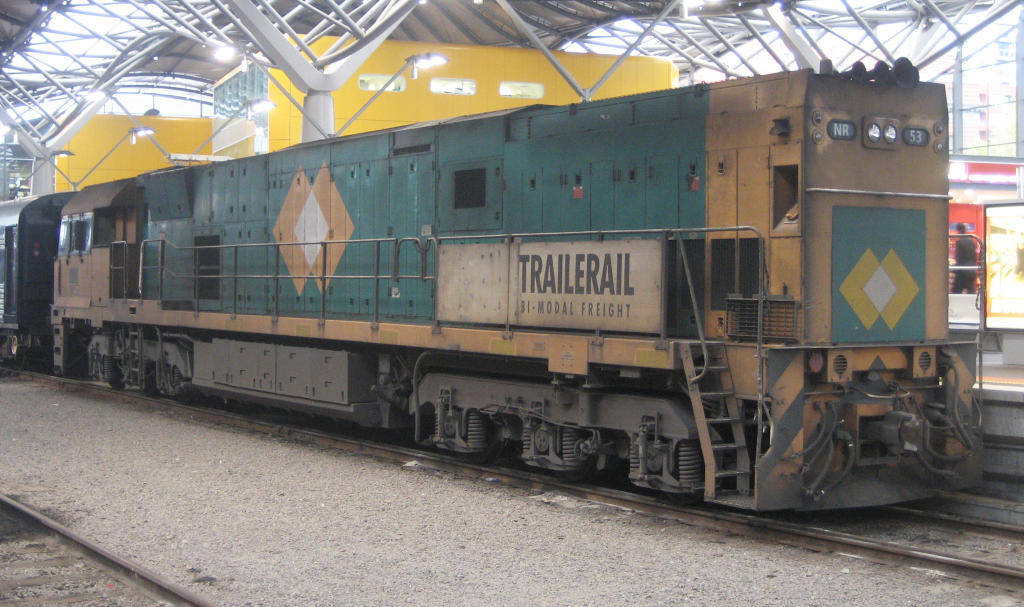
Trailerail liveried NR class at Southern Cross station in May 2007

The National Rail Corporation was established in February 1992 after the federal government, and state governments of New South Wales and Victoria agreed to its establishment in July 1991. It took over the running of all interstate services from Australian National, FreightCorp and V/Line. National Rail took over cross-border operations progressively from April 1993 over the interstate network between Brisbane, Sydney, Melbourne, Adelaide, Alice Springs and Perth. The first National Rail crewed trains ran between Melbourne and Adelaide on 8 November 1993.

National Rail established four business units, Intermodal, SeaTrain, SteelLink and Trailerail.

Most of National Rail's operations were on the 1435 mm standard gauge. However until the Melbourne-Adelaide railway was converted in June 1995, these services operated on the 1600 mm broad gauge.

SteelLink services from Port Kembla to Long Island used to transfer their loads from standard gauge to broad gauge wagons at Albury, but this was transferred to Dynon in May 1995.

From 1998, National Rail was able to compete for intrastate contracts. In June 1999, National Rail began operating blue metal trains from Dunmore to Cooks River. In August 1999, National Rail began operating iron ore services from Cobar to Newcastle with subcontractor Silverton Rail hauling the trains between Cobar and Narromine.

In November 1999, National Rail began operating limestone services from Marulan to Port Kembla. In early 2000, National Rail commenced operating a contract for Macquarie Generation to haul coal to their Bayswater and Liddell Power Stations in the Hunter Valley.

In February 2002, National Rail was combined with the New South Wales Government owned FreightCorp and sold to a Patrick Corporation and Toll Holdings consortium and rebranded as Pacific National.

== Fleet ==
Upon commencing operations in April 1993, National Rail inherited a diverse collection of rolling stock. The fleet included locomotives of mixed age and power provided by Australian National, FreightCorp and V/Line. This was an interim measure pending delivery of a fleet of modern locomotives to replace them. An order for 80, later to become 120 NR class locomotives was placed with A Goninan & Co in September 1995. The first unit commenced trials in September 1996 with all delivered by October 1997.

With the arrival of the NR class, National Rail was able to return leased units to their owners, including FreightCorp 422, 80, 81, and 82 class units; Silverton Rail 442s; and V/Line C class locomotives. The relatively new Australian National EL class were also withdrawn from the National Rail roster in November 1997 and placed in store at Islington Railway Workshops. Once all 120 NR class locomotives were delivered, the National Rail retained the BL, DL and AN class units, along with thirteen 81 class and several hired G class.

National Rail decided it would operate diesel locomotives over the electrified New South Wales lines from Sydney to Broadmeadow and Lithgow.

To operate SteelLink services for BHP from Long Island to Dynon on the 1600 mm broad gauge, X class locomotives were hired from V/Line until replaced by four dedicated BL class locomotives.
