= Aurizon electric locomotives =

Electric locomotives operated in Queensland

Aurizon electric locomotives are used by Australian rail operator Aurizon in Queensland.

== Background ==
Early in 1978, discussions were commenced on possible electrification of the Blackwater and Goonyella coal networks. This was due to an expected increase in coal traffic across the networks, ageing diesel-electric locomotive fleet and the increase in diesel fuel costs. By early 1983, a decision had been made to electrify the networks and by early 1984 contracts were already starting to be let for the new locomotives and other works for the project. The decision was made to electrify with the 25 kV AC railway electrification system as used in the Brisbane suburban network. This would allow future connection of the Brisbane network with the coal networks via the North Coast line.

== Electrification project ==
The project was to be carried out in four stages:

=== Stage 1 ===
Electrification of the main line from Gladstone to Rockhampton, including parts of Rockhampton marshalling yard, then west to Blackwater and the coal mines in the area. This was a total of 720 kilometres of track.

=== Stage 2 ===
Electrification of the coal lines south of Dalrymple Bay and Hay Point, then west through the Goonyella system, south-west to Blair Athol and south to Gregory – linking the Goonyella system to the Blackwater system. This was a total of 773 kilometres of track.

=== Stage 3 ===
Electrification of the main western line from Burngrove to Emerald. This would allow electric freight from Rockhampton to Emerald.

=== Stage 4 ===
Electrification of the line from Newlands coal mine to Collinsville and north-east to Abbott Point. This stage never went ahead. In 1986 it was decided to electrify the North Coast line between Brisbane and Gladstone instead and this became known as Stage 4.

== Locomotive contracts ==
In July 1984 Comeng were awarded a contract for 76 3100/3200 class locomotives. and a Clyde Engineering/ASEA-Walkers Limited joint venture, a contract for 70 3500/3600 class locomotives.

== 3100/3200 Class ==
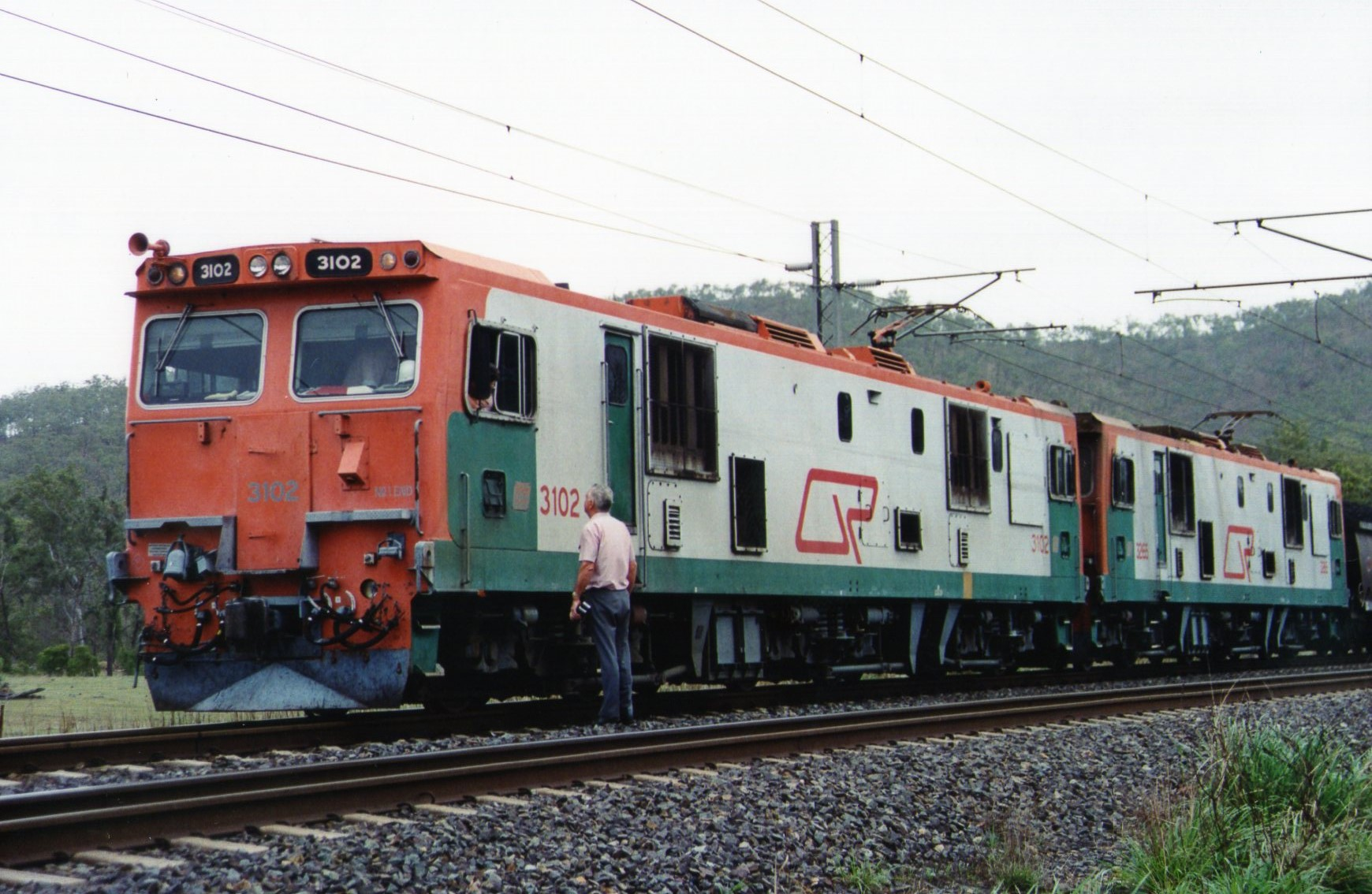
3102 & 3255 on the Goonyella line in 1991

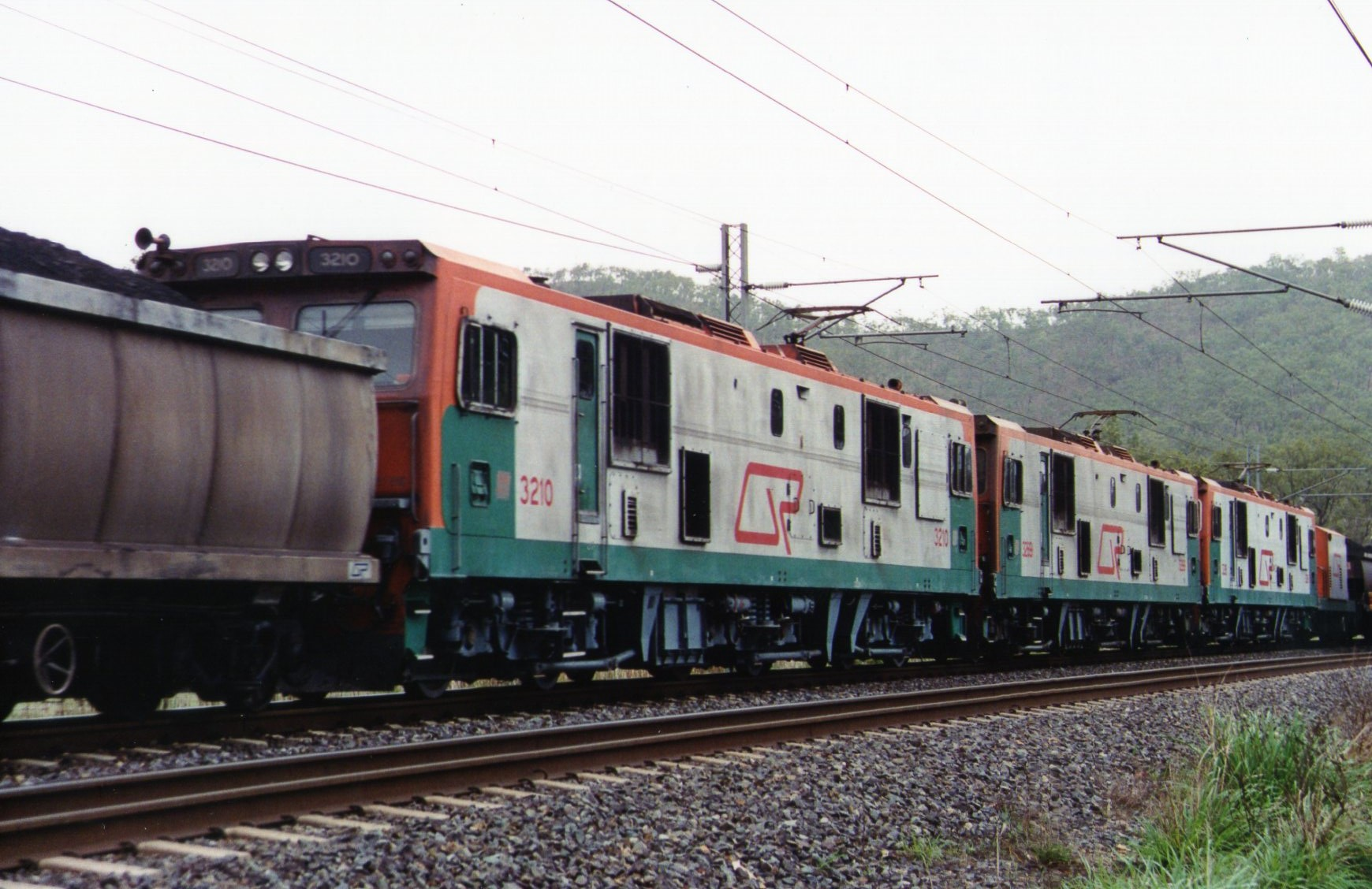
Three 32 class locomotives and the Locotrol wagon situated mid-train on a loaded coal train on the Goonyella line in 1991

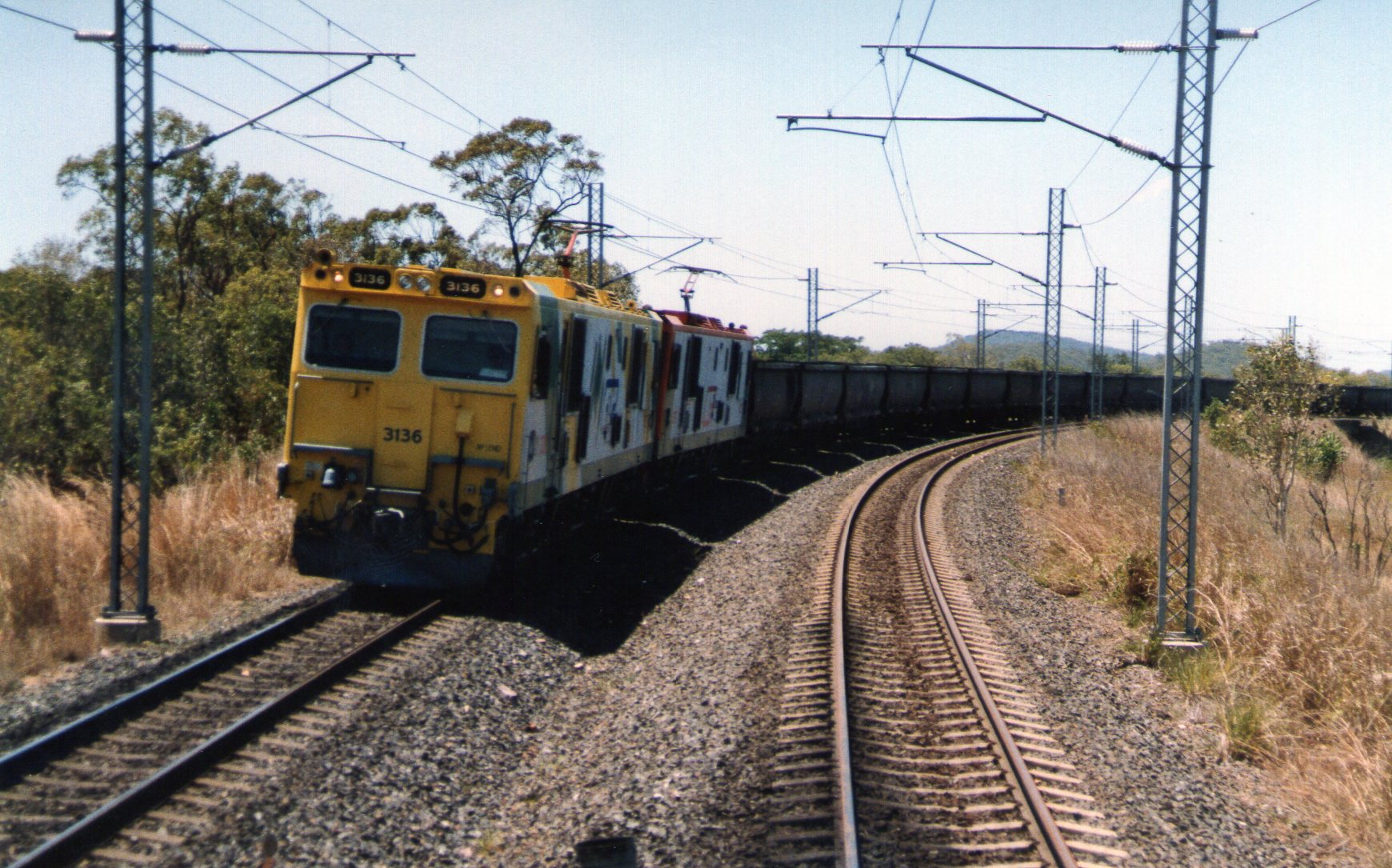
3136 in Bicentennial livery on the Goonyella line in 1991

Comeng built two classes of locomotive, the 3100 class were fitted with radio equipment to remotely control other locomotives unlike the 3200 class.

Design of the electrical equipment was by General Electric and Hitachi, with the bodies being built and assembled at Comeng's Brisbane factory.

The first locomotive, 3101 Sir Joh Bjelke-Petersen, was delivered on 26 May 1986.

This locomotive underwent extensive testing in the Brisbane area before heading north to the Gladstone area for further testing in conjunction with 3500/3600 class locomotives.

=== Bodies ===
Bodies of these locomotives differed from QR's diesel-electric locomotives which have only one driving cab whereas the electric had driver cab at each end. Each locomotive had an internal walkway connecting each cab. Bodies were the full width with no external walkway. The colour scheme was orange on either end, predominately white sides and green trim.

=== Bogies ===
Bogies for the new locomotives were of Bo-Bo-Bo wheel arrangement. This differed from the diesel-electrics of the day which had Co-Co wheel arrangement. This three bogie, two axle, arrangement gave better weight distribution of the much heavier locomotives as well as better tractive effort and wheel flange wear.

=== Traction motors ===
Traction for the locomotives is from six DC traction motors. Each motor is axle mounted. Power for the traction motors comes from the 25 kV overhead line via the roof mounted pantograph through a step down transformer and through the power control equipment to the traction motors. After the stepping down of the voltage the AC power is converted to DC by a bridge rectifier for use by the traction motors. The power for each motor is rated at 500 kW whereas those of QR's most powerful diesel-electric locomotives were only rated at 275 kW.

=== Control gear ===
Control of the locomotives made extensive use of silicon chip technology. Although some relays were used in the locomotives, extensive use of microprocessor technology was made. One of the stipulations for both contractors was that all locomotives from each contractor must be able to be used in any configuration. This meant that 3100/3200 class locomotives could be on the same train as 3500/3600 class locomotives.

=== Brakes ===
The 3100/3200 class were fitted with Davies & Metcalfe's P85 brake system. The locomotives are also fitted with Cutler-Hammer dynamic braking system.

=== Facilities for train crew ===
There were several improvements over the old diesel locomotives for driver comforts. These included on board toilets, equipment for traincrew preparing a hot meal whilst on board and air-conditioning for improved driver comfort.

== 3500/3600 Class ==
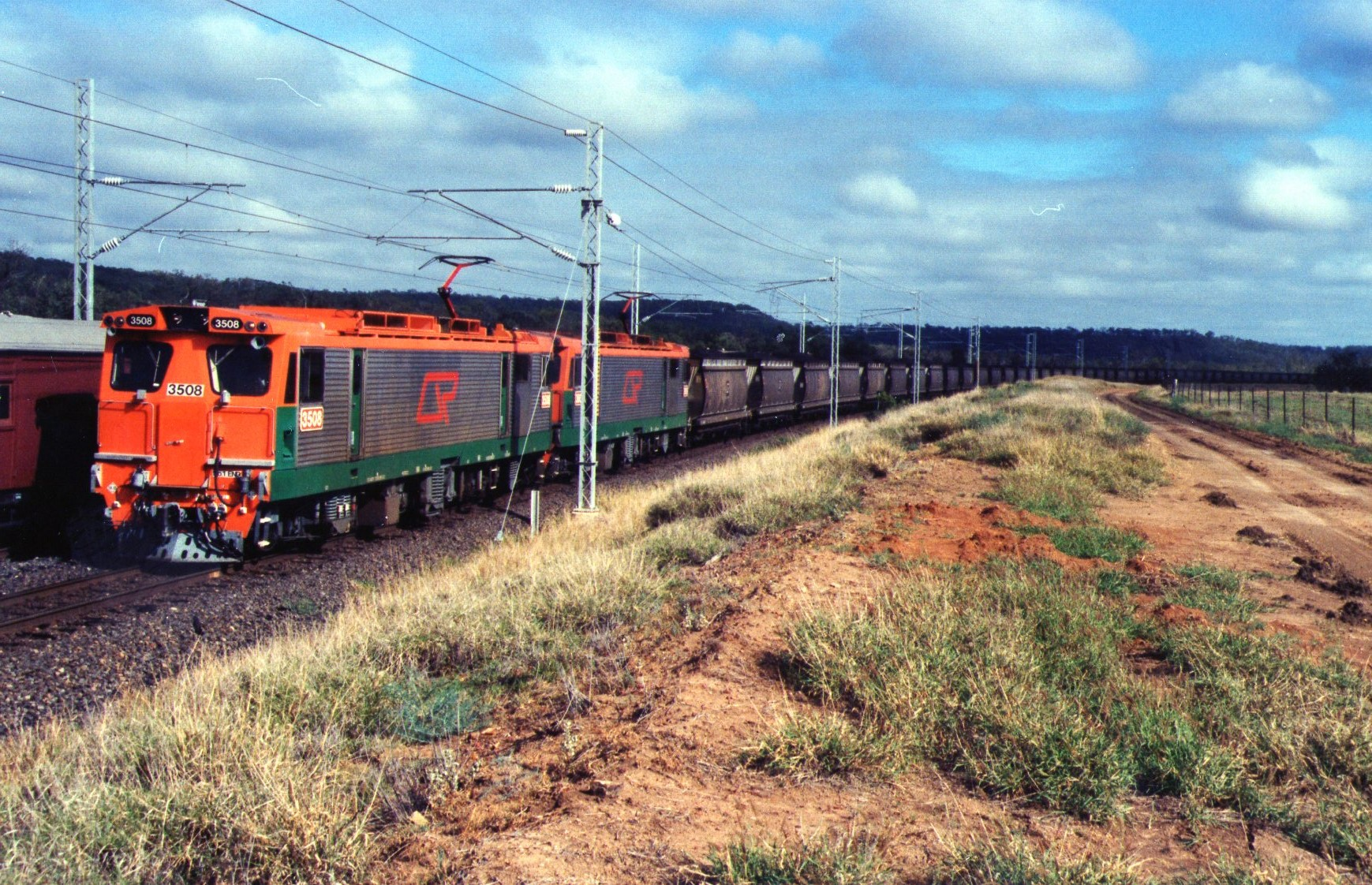
3508 and another haul an eastbound coal train on the Blackwater line in 1993.

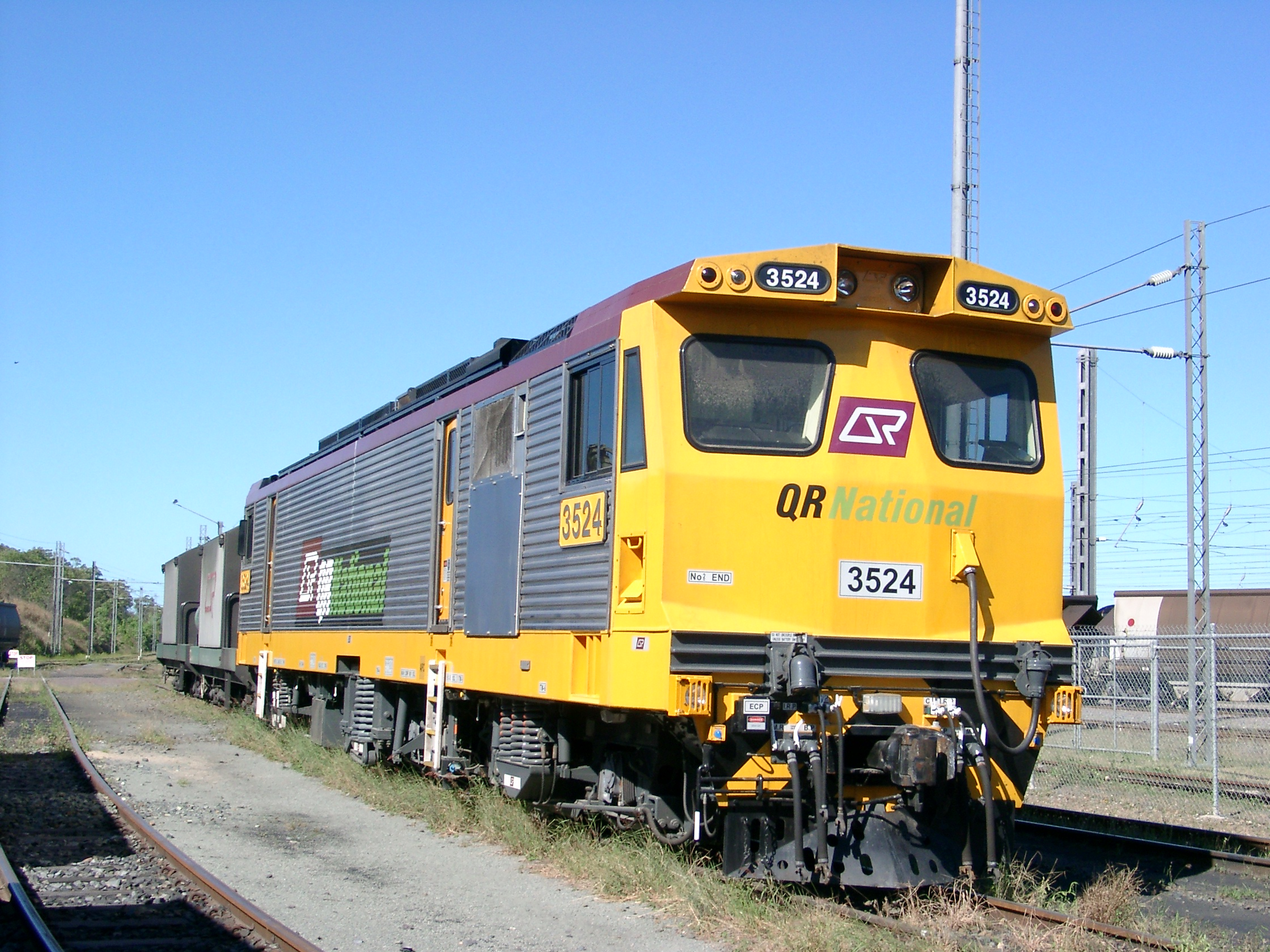
3524 in November 2008.

Walkers Limited built two classes of locomotive: the 3500 class were fitted with radio equipment to remotely control other locomotives unlike the other type, the 3600 class.

The first locomotive, 3501 DF Lane, was delivered on 29 May 1986.

This locomotive underwent extensive testing in the Brisbane area before heading north to the Gladstone area for further testing in conjunction with 3100/3200 class locomotives.

=== Bodies ===
The external side walls were manufactured from high grade stainless steel unlike the 3100 class that were painted steel. The roof hatches on these locomotives were made from aluminium. The overall colour scheme for the 3500 class matched the 3100 class with orange fronts, green side trims and high polished stainless steel sides. Body length was 19.38 metres

=== Bogies ===
3500 bogies were again a Bo-Bo-Bo wheel arrangement which achieved a higher tractive effort whilst ensuring better weight distribution and less wheel flange wear.

=== Traction motors ===
As with the 3100's the traction for the locomotives is from six DC traction motors. Each motor is axle mounted. Power for the traction motors comes from the 25 kV overhead line via the roof mounted pantograph through a step down transformer and through the power control equipment to the traction motors. After the stepping down of the voltage the AC power is converted to DC by a rectifier bridge for use by the traction motors.

=== Control gear ===
Control of the locomotives made extensive use of silicon chip technology. Although some relays were used in the locomotives, extensive use of microprocessor technology was made. One of the stipulations for both contractors was that all locomotives from each contractor must be able to be used in any configuration. This meant that 3100/3200 class locomotives could be on the same train as 3500/3600 class locomotives. These locomotives made use of a thyristor control system that had been developed by ASEA for use in their European locomotives.

=== Brakes ===
The 3500/3600 class were fitted with Davies & Metcalfe's P85 brake system. The locomotives are also fitted with Cutler-Hammer dynamic braking system.

=== Facilities for traincrew ===
There were several improvements over the old diesel locomotives for driver comforts. These included on board toilets, equipment for traincrew preparing a hot meal whilst on board and air-conditioning for improved driver comfort.

== 3300/3400 Class ==
In 1994 the Clyde/Hitachi 3300/3400 classes were introduced. These Bo-Bo-Bo locomotives generate 3000 kW (4020HP). The 3300s are command locos while the 3400s are slave/remote locos.

== 3900 Class ==
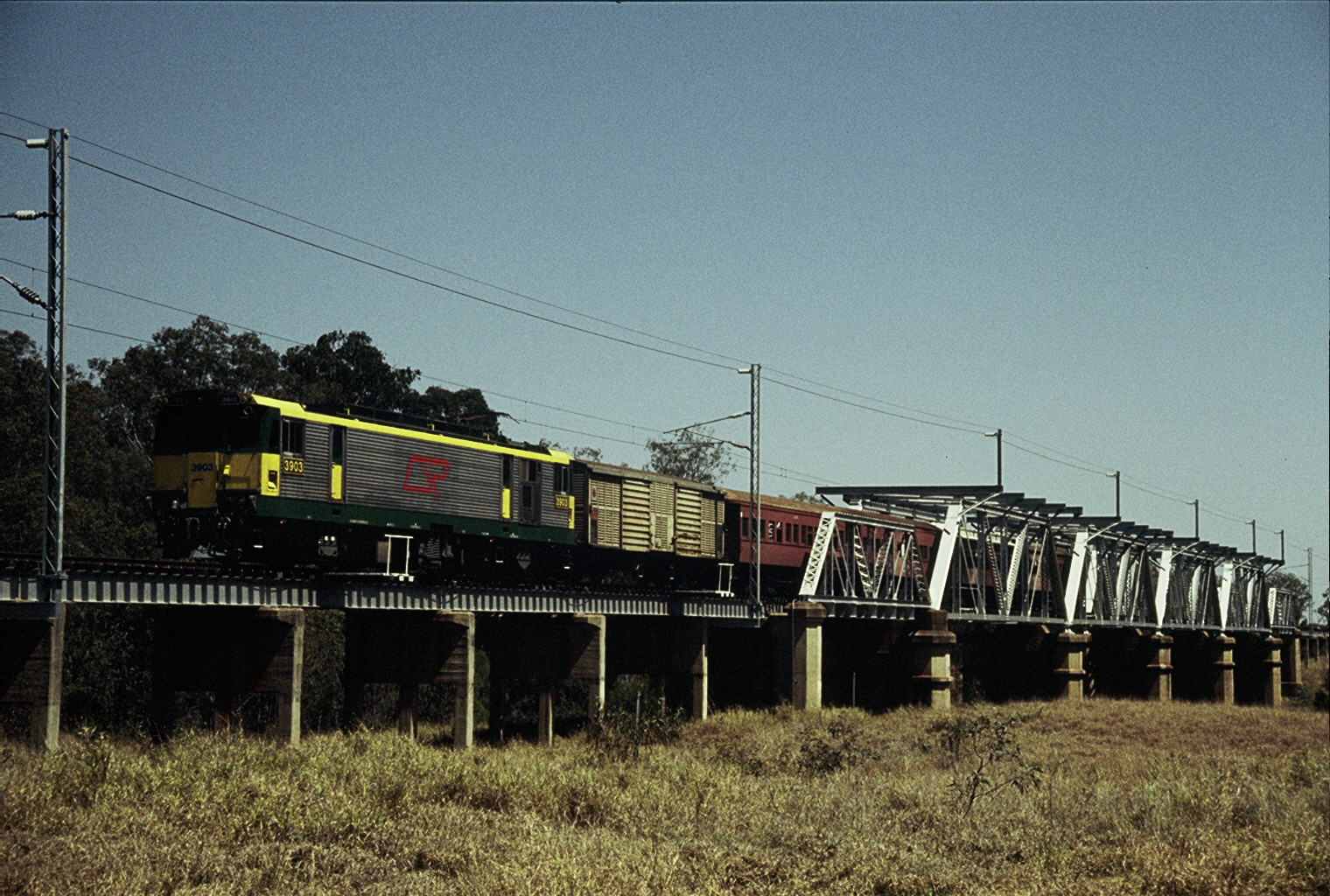
3903 hauling a special train crosses the Nogoa River bridge, east of Emerald in September 1989

Queensland Rail decided that the last thirty 3600 class locomotives would be used on passenger and general freight work and thus were built with gearing allowing for a higher top end speed as the 3900 class. In 2003 a contract was awarded to Downer EDI to rebuild 18 as the 3550 class for coal line operation.

Because these locomotives were designed for freight and not coal traffic a different gear ratio was used. This enabled higher speeds for the freight traffic.

== Refurbishment of existing rolling stock ==
=== 3550 Class ===
These locomotives were rebuilt by Downer EDI, Maryborough from 3900 class locomotives for operation on coal lines.

=== 3700 Class ===
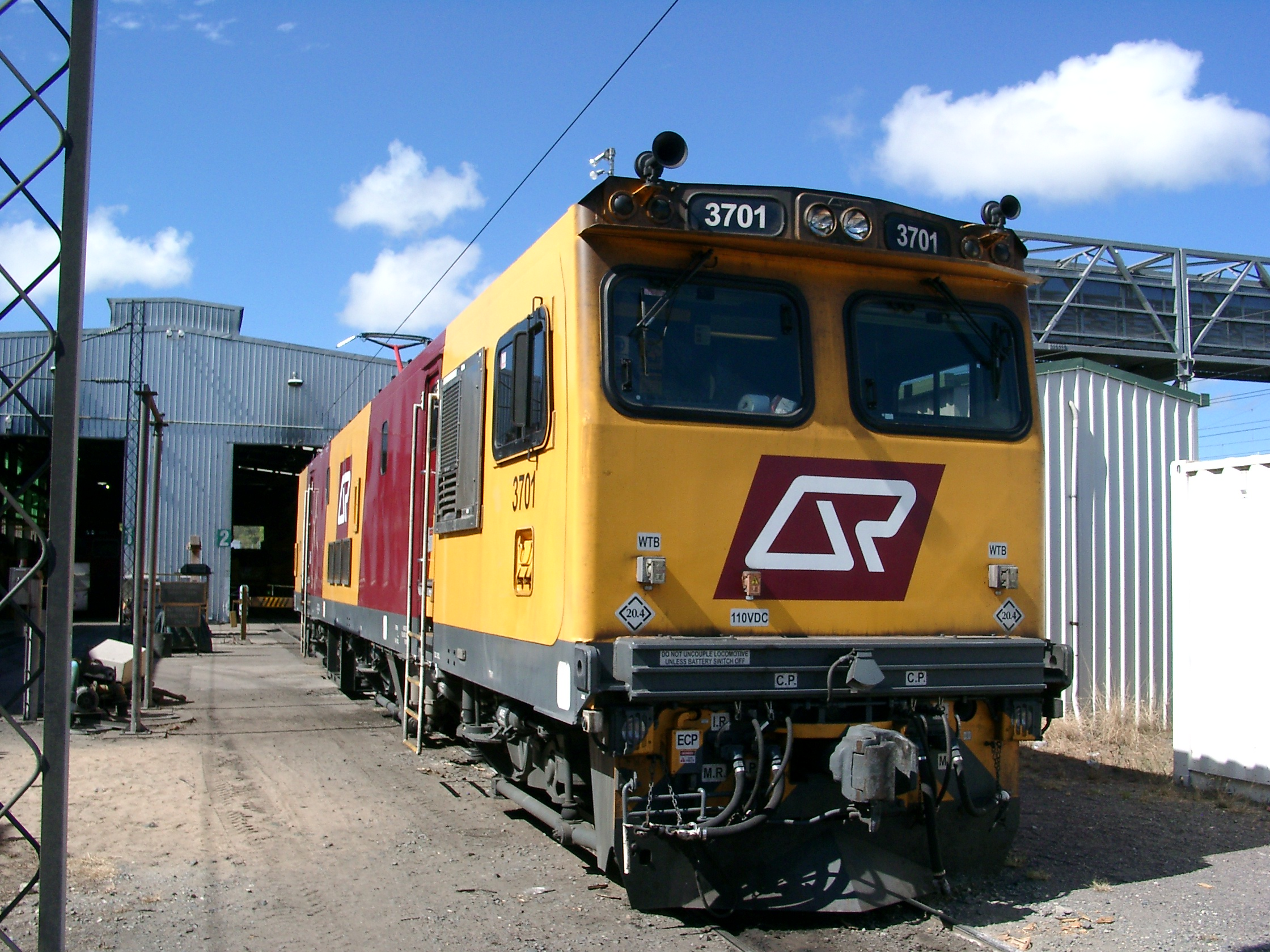
3701 in November 2008

By the late 1990s discussions were underway to find possible solutions to issue of the ageing electric locomotive fleet.

After considerable consultation with industry leaders and manufactures, it was decided to rebuild the existing fleet as well as buy new locomotives. The 3100/3200 class were to be completely rebuilt from the ground with only the original bodies being used in the new locomotives.

In March 2003, a contract was awarded to Siemens for the rebuilding of three 3200 class locomotives as prototypes for a proposed rebuild of the entire class. The work was undertaken at United Group, Townsville.

Deemed a success, it was decided to rebuild the rest of the class at United Group's Townsville and Broadmeadow factories. The weight and dimensions of the 3100 class meant that they had to have components removed at the Jilalan Depot, Mackay before they could be moved by rail to Townsville. These components were used both for spare parts for the rest of the 3100/3200 class and to allow a reduction in weight to comply with mainline track gauge restrictions.

At Townsville the locomotives were stripped down to the body shell with all internal components removed. The bodies were then sandblasted and any minor defects were repaired. They were rebuilt with only one cab, with the redundant cab enclosed with steel plating.

Bodies were then transported by road to Broadmeadow for rebuilding. There are several major changes to the locomotives. These include now using AC traction motors, distributed power locotrol system instead of Locotrol II, increased weight and increased traction effort.

With the increased tractive effort, the number of locomotives on each train has decreased from five to three locomotives on the Goonyella network. This gives a 60% increase in available locomotives to network operations without increasing the number of locomotives in the fleet.

== Purchase of new locomotives ==
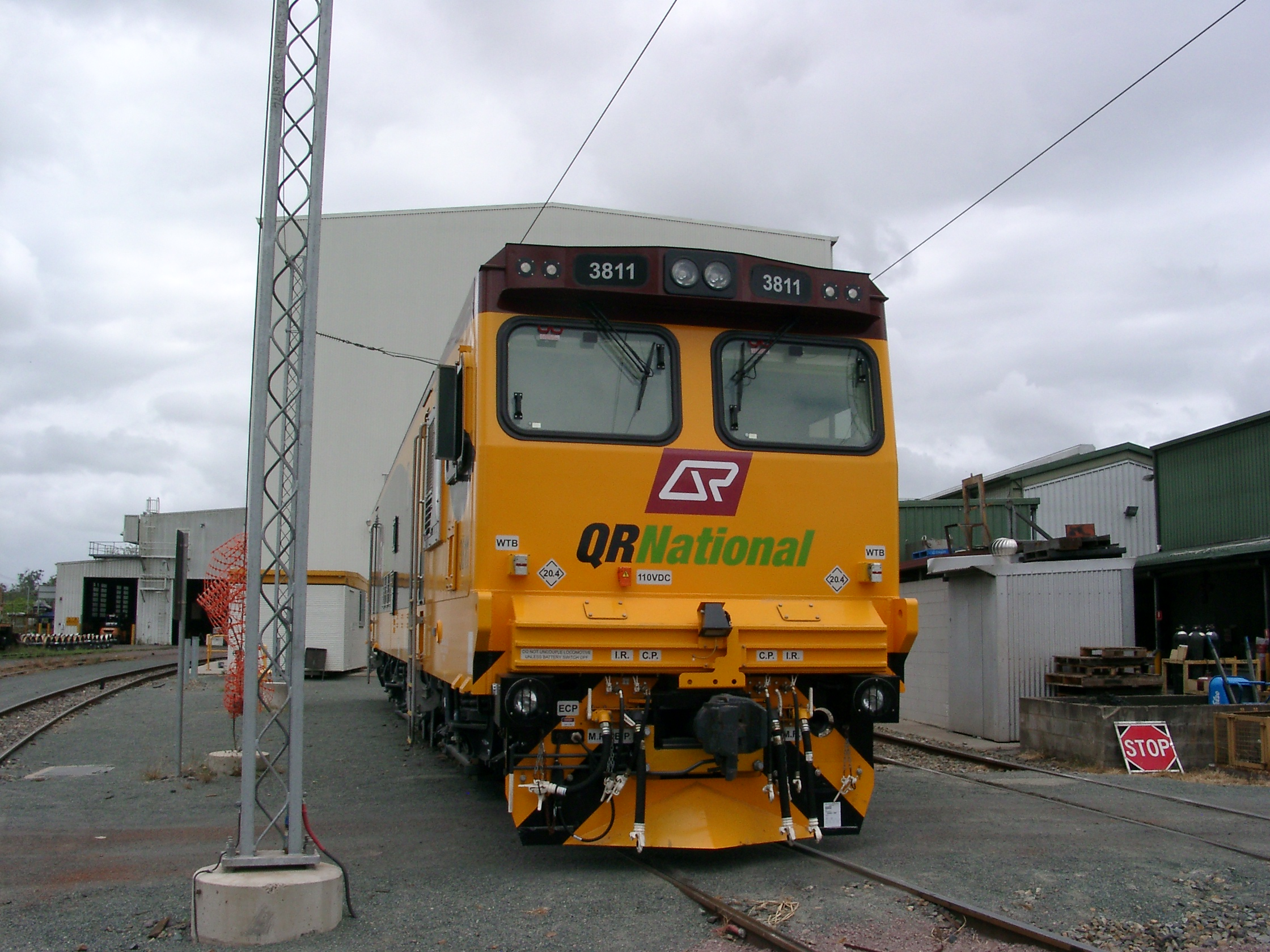
3811 in November 2008.

=== 3800 class ===
After consultation with the coal industry it was decided that there was not enough locomotive power available for the expected upturn in the coal industry. As a result, it was decided to purchase more locomotives for use on the Goonyella network. German company Siemens Mobility was awarded a contract for 20 3800 class locomotives. In August 2007, the order was increased to 45. These single ended locomotives were designed and built in Germany.
