= 3900 class =

3900 class or Class 3900 may refer to:

- JGR Class 3900, 0-6-0T steam locomotives
- Queensland Railways 3900 class, electric locomotives
