= Clyde Engineering JT26C-2SS locomotive =

The JT26C-2SS is a model of heavy haul diesel electric locomotive designed and built by Clyde Engineering in Australia, based on Electro-Motive Division designs. There were 3 derivative models produced for 3 different government operators in Australia. These variants are:

- New South Wales 81 class locomotive
- Australian National BL class
- V/Line G Class

These locomotives were developed from the JT26C (Australian National AL class), which in turn was developed from the J26C-2SS design used for the New South Wales 422 class locomotive which added a turbocharger, amongst other design improvements.

== Related development ==
- New South Wales 422 class locomotive (J26C)
- Australian National AL class (JT26C)
- British Rail Class 59 (JT26CW-SS)
