= 3300 class =

3300 class may refer to:

- GWR 3300 Class, 4-4-0 steam locomotives
- Queensland Railways 3300/3400 class, electric locomotives
