= Queensland Railways 3300/3400 class =

Class of Australian electric locomotives

Queensland Rail 3300/3400 class
Type and origin
- Power type: Electric
- Builder: Clyde Engineering; Kelso; Somerton
- Model: JAE 30B-3B
- Build date: 1994-1995
- Total produced: 22
Specifications
- Configuration
  - UIC: Bo-Bo-Bo
- Gauge: 1,067 mm (3 ft 6 in)
- Loco weight: 112.8 t (111.0 long tons; 124.3 short tons)
- Electric system/s: 25 kV AC
- Current pickup: Pantograph
Performance figures
- Maximum speed: 80 km/h (50 mph)
- Tractive effort: 2,970 kW (3,980 hp)
Career
- Operators: Queensland Rail
- Class: 3300/3400
- Number in class: 22
- Numbers: 3301-3304, 3316-3318, 3405-3415, 3419-3422
- Delivered: 21 February 1994
- Current owner: Aurizon

The 3300/3400 class are a class of electric locomotives built by Clyde Engineering, Kelso and Somerton for Queensland Rail in 1994–1995.

== History ==
To provide more locomotives with the impending opening of the Ensham coal mine, Clyde Engineering were awarded a contract to build 13 3300/3400 class electric locomotives. This was later extended to 22. The 3300/3400 class was an evolution of the 3100/3200 class. All were originally to be assembled at Clyde's Kelso, New South Wales factory, however because of capacity constraints the final seven were completed at their Somerton, Victoria facility.

The first was delivered in February 1994, however problems with the cooling systems delayed their entry into service until October 1994. They were initially used on the Blackwater railway system operating with 3500/3600 class locomotives. In 1999 they were transferred to Jilalan Depot, Mackay.

All were fitted with Locotrol systems that allowed remote control locomotives in the centre of a train to be controlled from a command unit. Thus two separate classes were built, seven class 3300 command units that could lead trains, and 15 class 3400 slave units.
