= Siemens E40 AG-V1 =

E40 AG-V1
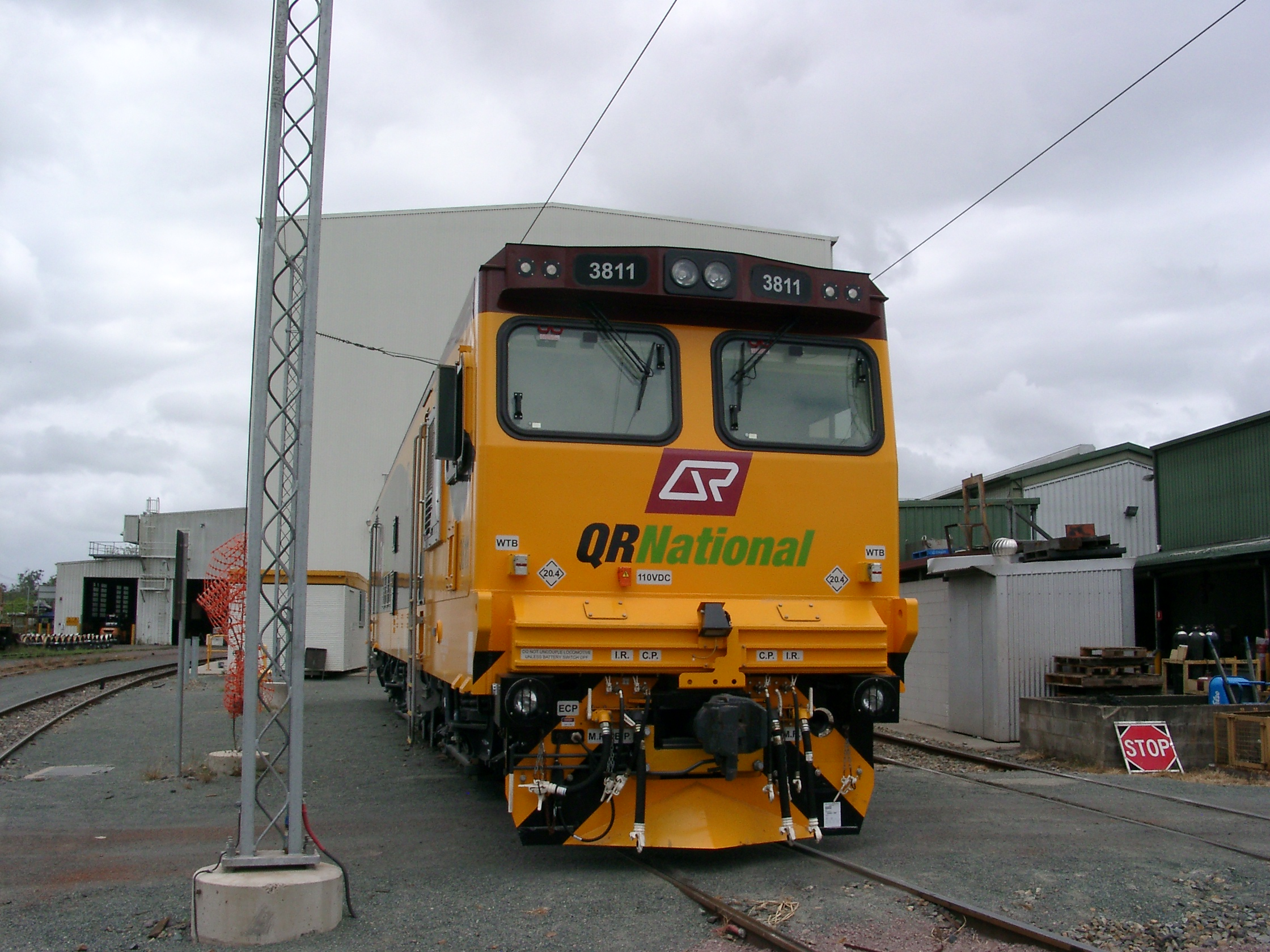
- QR National 3811 in November 2008
Type and origin
- Power type: Electric
- Builder: Siemens Mobility, Munich
- Build date: 2006-2014
- Total produced: 100
Specifications
- Configuration
  - AAR: B-B-B
  - UIC: Bo′Bo′Bo′
- Gauge: 1,067 mm (3 ft 6 in)
- Wheel diameter: 1,090 mm (42.9 in)
- Length: 20.4 m (66 ft 11 1/8 in)
- Electric system/s: 25 kV 50 Hz AC
- Current pickup: Pantograph
- Traction motors: Siemens 1TB2622
- Loco brake: Wabtec 26L
Performance figures
- Maximum speed: 80 km/h (50 mph)
- Power output: 4 MW (5,360 hp)
- Tractive effort: 450 kN (100,000 lbf)
- Brakeforce: 450 kN (100,000 lbf)
Career
- Operators: Queensland Rail; Pacific National; BHP Mitsubishi Alliance
- Class: Aurizon: 3800; Pacific National: 71; BHP Mitsubishi Alliance: BMACC
- Numbers: Aurizon: 3801-3845; Pacific National: 7101-7142; BHP Mitsubishi Alliance: BMACC001-013
- Current owner: Aurizon; Pacific National; BHP Mitsubishi Alliance
- Disposition: 100 in service

The Siemens E40 AG-V1 is a type of electric locomotive built by Siemens Mobility for use in Queensland, Australia.

== History ==
The design is based on the Queensland Railways 3700 class electric locomotive, rebuilt by UGL Rail from older locomotives using Siemens components. The engine room layout is similar to the 3700 class and the majority of the electrical components are identical. All are used on trains on the Queensland coal network.

== By operator ==
=== Aurizon ===
In March 2006, Queensland Rail awarded a contract for the supply of 20 Class 3800 narrow gauge electric locomotives. In August 2007, the order was increased to 45. In July 2010, these passed into the ownership of Aurizon.

=== Pacific National ===
Pacific National ordered 23 units in 2008 with the first delivered in February 2009. In July 2010, the order was increased to 32.

=== BHP Mitsubishi Alliance ===
The BHP Mitsubishi Alliance ordered 13 locomotives in July 2012. As at February 2014, seven had been delivered. They will be used in the Bowen Basin.

== Summary ==
Operator	Class	Number in class	Road numbers	Built	Notes
Aurizon	3800	45	3801-3845	2008-2010	
Pacific National	71	42	7101-7142	2009-2011	
BHP Mitsubishi Alliance	BMACC	13	BMACC001-013	2013/14	
