= Queensland Railways 3500/3600 class =

Class of Australian electric locomotives

Queensland Rail 3500/3600 class
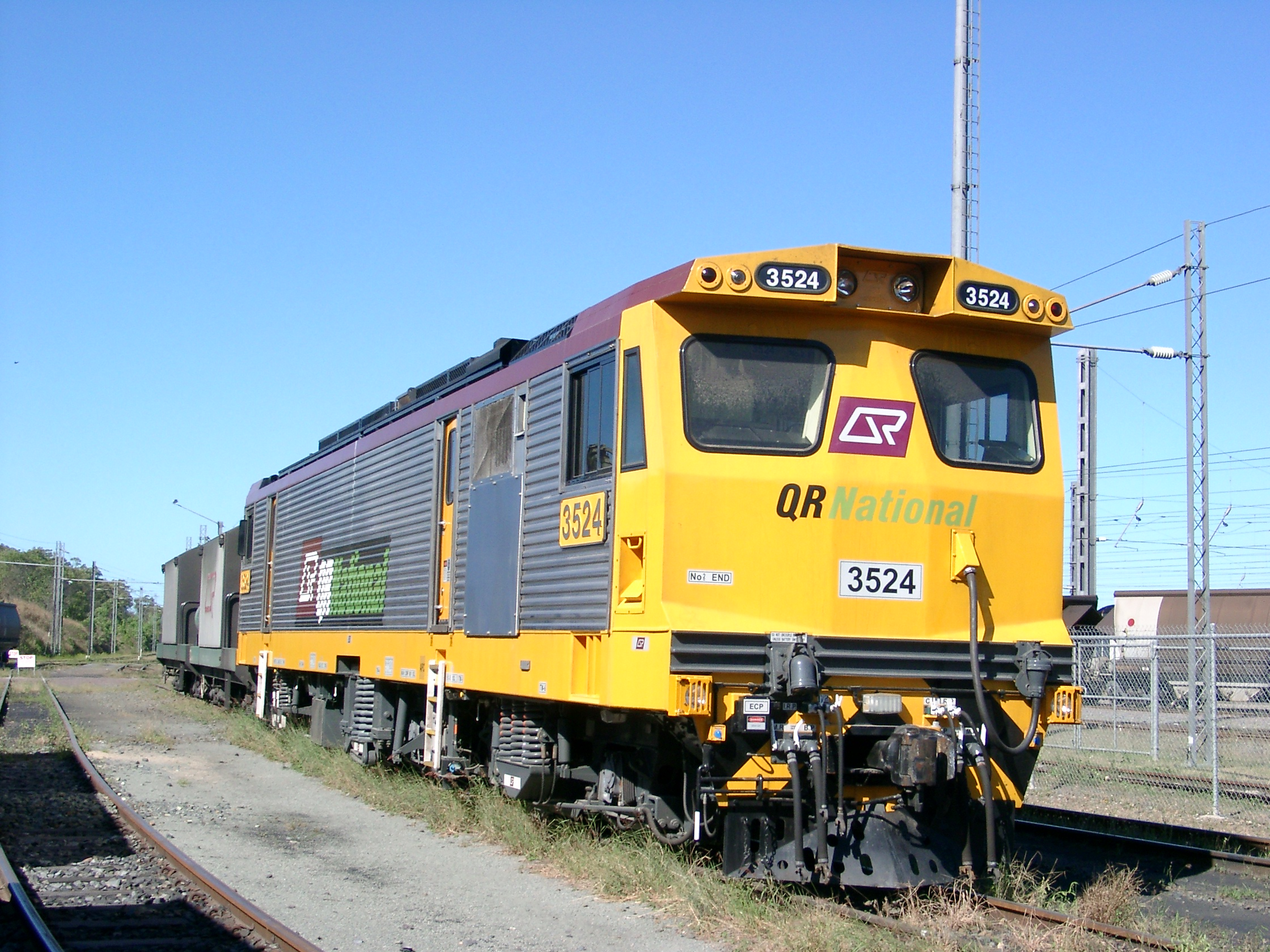
- 3524 in November 2008
Type and origin
- Power type: Electric
- Builder: Walkers Limited, Maryborough; ASEA
- Model: CF48
- Build date: 1986-1988
- Total produced: 50
Specifications
- Configuration
  - UIC: Bo-Bo-Bo
- Gauge: 1,067 mm (3 ft 6 in)
- Length: 20.02 m (65 ft 8 in)
- Width: 2.8 m (9 ft 2 in)
- Height: 3.89 m (12 ft 9 in)
- Loco weight: 109.8 t (108.1 long tons; 121.0 short tons)
- Electric system/s: 25 kV AC
- Current pickup: Pantograph
- Traction motors: ASEA
- Train brakes: Davies & Metcalfe P85
Performance figures
- Maximum speed: 80 km/h (50 mph)
- Tractive effort: 2,890 kW (3,880 hp)
Career
- Operators: Queensland Rail
- Class: 3500/3600
- Number in class: 50
- Numbers: 3501-3504, 3508, 3512, 3516, 3520, 3524, 3528, 3532, 3536, 3540, 3544, 3546-3550, 3605-3607, 3609-3611, 3613-3615, 3617-3619, 3621-3623, 3625-3627, 3629-3631, 3633-3635, 3637-3639, 3641-3643, 3645
- Delivered: 29 May 1986
- Current owner: Aurizon

The 3500/3600 class are a class of electric locomotives built by Walkers Limited, Maryborough and ASEA for Queensland Rail between 1986 and 1988.

== History ==
In July 1984, a joint venture of Clyde Engineering and Walkers Limited was awarded a contract to build 70 3500/3600 class electric locomotives with ASEA supplying the electrical equipment. These were ordered to operate coal trains on the Blackwater and Goonyella railway lines that were in the process of being electrified.

The bodies were built and assembled at Walkers's Maryborough factory with Clyde Engineering responsible for some of the electrical equipment and commissioning the locomotives.

The first locomotive, 3501 DF Lane, was delivered on 29 May 1986.

All were fitted with the Locotrol systems that allowed remote control locomotives in the centre of a train to be controlled from a command unit. Thus two classes were built: 19 class-3500 command units that could lead trains, and 31 class-3600 slave units. The bodies were manufactured with fluted stainless steel.

The original order was later increased to 80. Following the decision to electrify the North Coast line from Brisbane to Rockhampton, the last 30 were modified for passenger and general freight use, and delivered as the 3900 class.
