= Queensland Railways 3900 class =

Class of Australian electric locomotives

Queensland Rail 3900 class
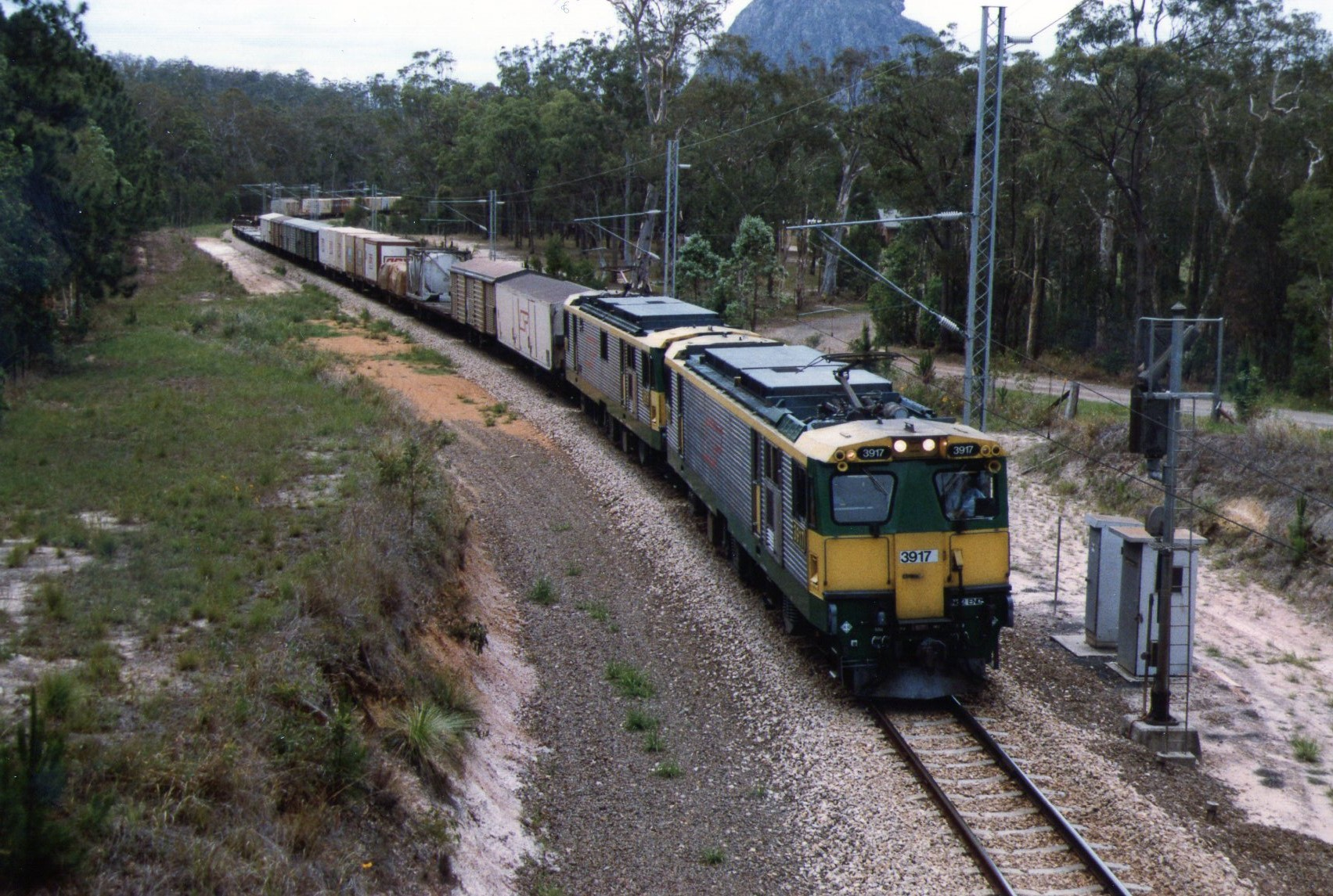
- 3917 and another haul a northbound freight train on the North Coast line in 1989.
Type and origin
- Power type: Electric
- Builder: Walkers Limited, Maryborough
- Model: JA39-3B
- Build date: 1988–1990
- Total produced: 30
- Number rebuilt: 19
Specifications
- Configuration
  - UIC: Bo-Bo-Bo
- Gauge: 1,067 mm (3 ft 6 in)
- Length: 20.02 m (65 ft 8 in)
- Width: 2.8 m (9 ft 2 in)
- Height: 3.89 m (12 ft 9 in)
- Loco weight: 109.8 t (108.1 long tons; 121.0 short tons)
- Electric system/s: 25 kV AC overhead lines
- Current pickup: Pantograph
- Traction motors: ASEA
- Train brakes: Davies & Metcalfe P85
Performance figures
- Maximum speed: 100 km/h (62 mph)
- Tractive effort: 2,890 kW (3,880 hp)
Career
- Operators: Queensland Rail
- Class: 3900
- Number in class: 30
- Numbers: 3901–3930
- Delivered: 1988
- Current owner: Aurizon

The 3900 class are a class of electric locomotives built by Walkers Limited, Maryborough for Queensland Rail between 1988 and 1990.

== History ==
In July 1984, a joint venture of Clyde Engineering and Walkers Limited was awarded a contract to build 70 3500/3600 class electric locomotives with ASEA supplying the electrical equipment. These were ordered to operate coal trains on the Blackwater and Goonyella railway lines that were in the process of being electrified. The contract was later extended to 80.

The bodies being built and assembled at Walkers's Maryborough factory with Clyde Engineering responsible for some of the electrical equipment and commissioning the locomotives.

Following the decision to electrify the North Coast line from Brisbane to Rockhampton, the last 30 were built to a modified design for passenger and general freight use, and delivered as the 3900 class. They received modified bodies to allow them to pass through Brisbane's tunnels and received higher gearing to allow them to operate at 100 km/h (62 mph).

== 3550 class ==
With an increased need for locomotives on the Central Queensland coal lines, 19 were converted to 3550 class locomotives.
