= Queensland Railways 2800 class =

Class of Australian diesel-electric locomotives

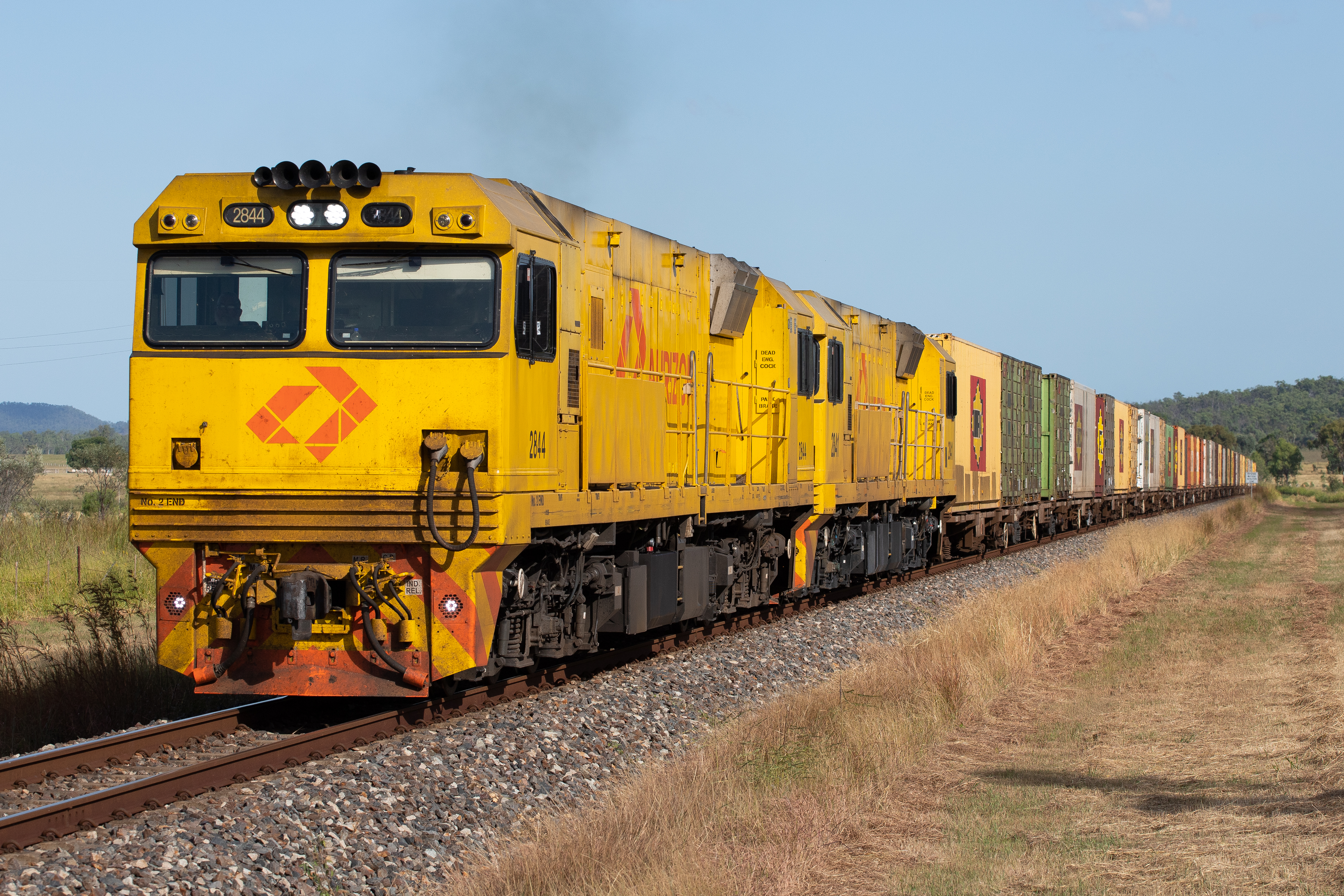
- 2844 and 2841 at Kunwarara on the North Coast Line in 2022.
Type and origin
- Power type: Diesel-electric
- Builder: A Goninan & Co, Townsville
- Serial number: 162-201, 323-332
- Model: General Electric CM30-8
- Build date: 1995–1998
- Total produced: 50
Specifications
- Configuration
  - UIC: Co-Co
- Gauge: 1,067 mm (3 ft 6 in); 1,435 mm (4 ft 8 1/2 in) standard gauge
- Length: 20.48 m (67 ft 2 in)
- Width: 2.87 m (9 ft 5 in)
- Height: 3.68 m (12 ft 1 in)
- Loco weight: 116 t (114 long tons; 128 short tons)
- Fuel type: Diesel
- Prime mover: GE 7FDL-12
- Engine type: V12 Diesel engine
- Generator: GE GMG192H1
- Traction motors: GE 761-ANR2
- Cylinders: 12
Performance figures
- Maximum speed: 100 km/h (62 mph)
- Power output: 2,380 kW (3,190 hp)
Career
- Operators: Aurizon
- Number in class: 45
- Numbers: 2801–2813, 2815–2850
- Delivered: 1995
- First run: September 1995
- Last run: August 1998
- Current owner: Aurizon
- Disposition: 44 in service, 4 renumbered, 1 stored, 1 scrapped

The 2800 class are a class of diesel locomotive built by A Goninan & Co, Townsville for Queensland Rail between 1995 and 1998.

They are currently owned by Aurizon, and operate on the North Coast and Mount Isa lines.

== History ==
The 2800 class were ordered to haul passenger and freight services on the North Coast line between Rockhampton and Cairns and on the Great Northern line between Townsville and Mount Isa. The initial order for 40 was later increased to 50. However, a miscommunication resulted in the builder's plates incorrectly being stamped as 202 to 211 which had been used by other A Goninan & Co locomotives, rather than the correct 323 to 332.

They now operate trains as far south as Brisbane. They are the only double ended diesel electric locomotives to have been built for Queensland Rail.

In February 2006, one locomotive was fitted with standard gauge bogies for use by QR National in New South Wales and Victoria, but the NSW Environment Protection Authority refused permission for it to be used in that state due to excessive noise emissions. In August 2009, it was converted back to narrow gauge for use in Western Australia. In 2013, three were reclassified as the 3200 class for use in NSW, following the installation of standard gauge bogies and a modified exhaust system that reduced low frequency noise emissions.

In 2015, 2814 derailed on the Mount Isa Line at Julia Creek, spilling sulphuric acid. 2814 flipped on its side and was deemed too damaged to repair, and as such was scrapped in 2017.

In the early hours of Wednesday 23 February 2022, 2811 along with 2338 derailed hauling a container train near Traveston after severe rain washed out the tracks. Both locomotives were turned onto their sides. 2811 is currently at UGL Rail's facility in Stuart, Queensland.

== Status Table ==
Number	Owner	Livery	In service	Status	Current Number	Withdrawn	Scrapped	Notes
2801	Aurizon	Canary/bulk	September 1995	In service	original number			
2802	Aurizon	Canary/bulk	October 1995	In service	original number			
2803	Aurizon	Canary/bulk	October 1995	In service	original number			
2804	Aurizon	Canary/bulk	November 1995	In service	original number			
2805	Aurizon	Canary/bulk	October 1995	In service	original number			
2806	Aurizon	Canary/bulk	November 1995	In service	original number			
2807	Aurizon	Canary/bulk	December 1995	In service	original number			
2808	Aurizon	Canary/bulk	December 1995	In service	original number			Damaged in Oonoomurra derailment 17/08/2022, repaired at Stuart
2809	Aurizon	Canary/Bulk	December 1995	Renumbered	3209			In service on SG in NSW, renumbered to 3209
2810	Aurizon	Canary/bulk	January 1996	In service	original number			
2811	Aurizon	Pineapple	January 1996	Stored	original number			Damaged in Traveston derailment 23/2/2022. Returned to Stuart.
2812	Aurizon	Canary/bulk	February 1996	In service	original number			
2813	Aurizon	Pineapple	February 1996	In service	original number			
2814	Aurizon	Bronco	February 1996	Scrapped	original number	December 2015	September 2017	Destroyed in 2015 Julia Creek derailment
2815	Aurizon	Pineapple	February 1996	Renumbered	3215			In service on SG in NSW
2816	Aurizon	Canary/bulk	March 1996	In service	original number			
2817	Aurizon	Pineapple	March 1996	In service	original number			
2818	Aurizon	Pineapple	March 1996	In service	original number			
2819	Aurizon	ARG Yellow and Red	March 1996	Renumbered	PA2819			Regauged to SG, however refused by NSW EPA and sent to WA on NG for QR National subsidiary ARG and repainted into their scheme.
2820	Aurizon	Canary/bulk	May 1996	In service	original number			Last 2800 to wear QR's Bronco paint scheme
2821	Aurizon	Pineapple	June 1996	Renumbered	3221	June 2012		In service on SG in NSW
2822	Aurizon	Canary/bulk	June 1996	In service	original number			
2823	Aurizon	Pineapple	June 1996	In service	original number			
2824	Aurizon	Pineapple	July 1996	In service	original number			
2825	Aurizon	Pineapple	July 1996	In service	original number			
2826	Aurizon	Pineapple	June 1996	In service	original number			
2827	Aurizon	Pineapple	July 1996	In service	original number			
2828	Aurizon	Pineapple	July 1996	In service	original number			
2829	Aurizon	Canary/bulk	August 1996	In service	original number			
2830	Aurizon	Pineapple	August 1996	In service	original number			
2831	Aurizon	Pineapple	August 1996	In service	original number			Has part canary/bulk livery on one side due to fire damage
2832	Aurizon	Pineapple	September 1996	In service	original number			
2833	Aurizon	Canary/bulk	September 1996	In service	original number			
2834	Aurizon	Pineapple	October 1996		original number			
2835	Aurizon	Pineapple	October 1996		original number			
2836	Aurizon	Canary/bulk	October 1996	In service	original number			
2837	Aurizon	Canary/bulk	December 1996	In service	original number			
2838	Aurizon	Pineapple	December 1996	In service	original number			
2839	Aurizon	Canary/bulk	February 1997	In service	original number			
2840	Aurizon	Pineapple	March 1997	In service	original number			
2841	Aurizon	Canary/bulk	June 1998	In service	original number			
2842	Aurizon	Pineapple	June 1998	In service	original number			
2843	Aurizon	Canary/bulk	June 1998	In service	original number			
2844	Aurizon	Canary/bulk	June 1998	In service	original number			
2845	Aurizon	Canary/bulk	June 1998	In service	original number			
2846	Aurizon	Canary/bulk	June 1998	In service	original number			
2847	Aurizon	Canary/bulk	June 1998	In service	original number			
2848	Aurizon	Canary/bulk	July 1998	In service	original number			
2849	Aurizon	Canary/bulk	July 1998	In service	original number			
2850	Aurizon	Canary/bulk	August 1998	In service	original number			Last 2800 to wear QR National's Eagle paint scheme.
