= Aurizon =

Australian rail freight company

Aurizon Holdings Limited

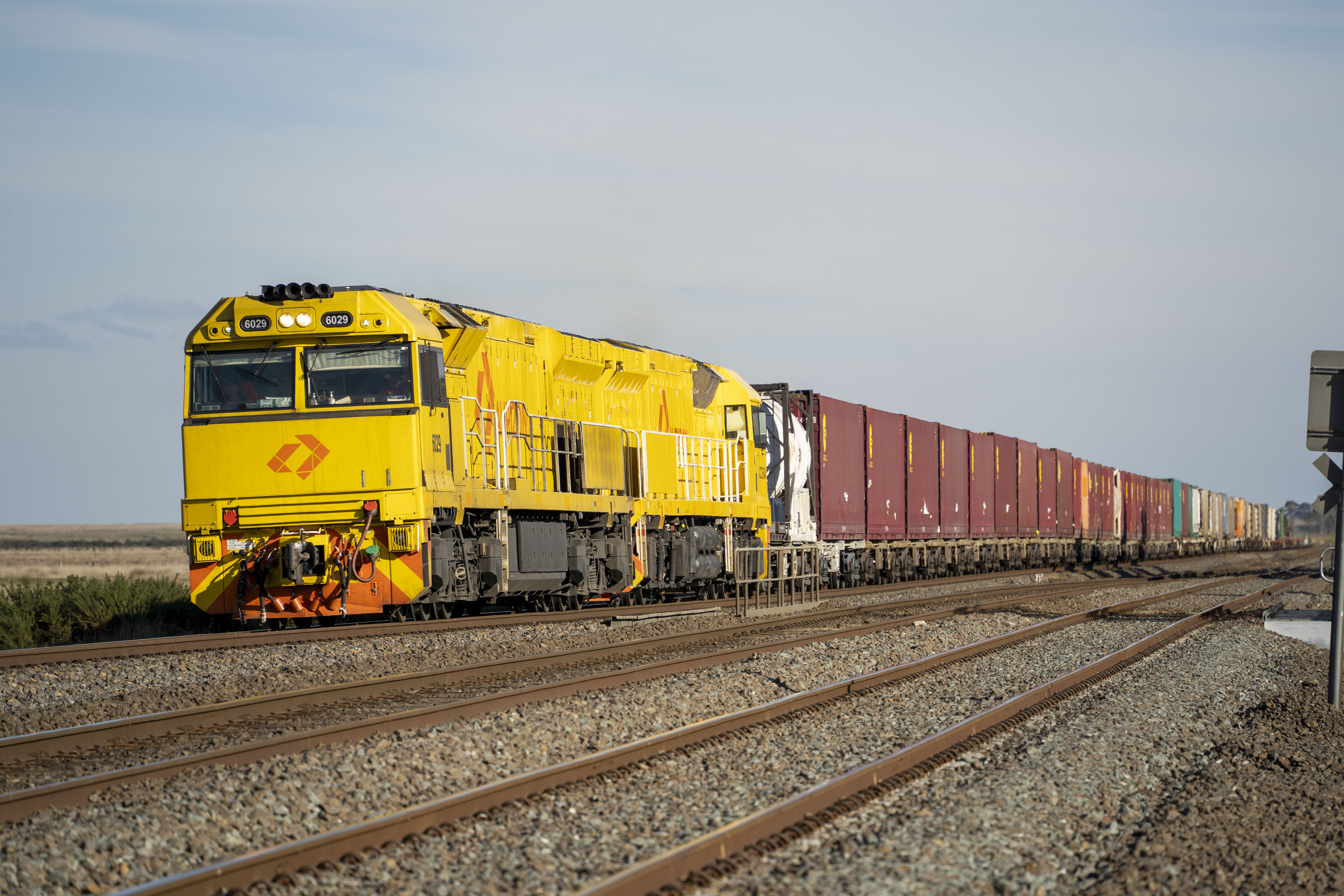
- Aurizon intermodal rail service passing through Wallan, Victoria in April 2024
- Formerly: QR National Limited
- Type: Government-owned corporation (2004-2010); Publicly traded company (2010-present)
- Traded as: ASX: AZJ
- Industry: Rail transport
- Founded: 2004; 22 years ago
- Headquarters: Brisbane, Australia
- Area served: New South Wales; Queensland; South Australia; Victoria; Western Australia; Northern Territory
- Key people: Chairman: Tim Poole; CEO: Andrew Harding
- Products: Coal, bulk, and containerised freight
- Services: Logistics, supply chain management, line haul, and terminal operations
- Revenue: AUD$3.844 billion (2024)
- Net income: AUD$406 (2024)
- Number of employees: 4,883 (2020)
- Divisions: Network, Coal, Bulk, Containerised Freight
- Website: aurizon.com.au

Aurizon Holdings Limited (/əˈraɪzən/ ə-RY-zən) is a freight rail transport company in Australia, formerly named QR National Limited and branded QR National. In 2015, it was the world's largest rail transporter of coal from mine to port. Formerly a Queensland Government-owned corporation, it was privatised and floated on the Australian Securities Exchange (ASX) in November 2010. The company was originally established in 2004-05 when the coal, bulk and container transport divisions of Queensland Rail were brought under one banner as QR National.

In 2019, the company operated in five Australian states. On an average day, it moved more than 700,000 metric tons (690,000 long tons) of coal, iron ore, other minerals, agricultural products and general freight, equating to more than 250 million tonnes annually. Aurizon also managed the 2670 kilometre (1660 mi)-long Central Queensland coal network that links mines to coal ports at Bowen, Gladstone and Mackay. It was the largest haulier of iron ore outside the Pilbara.

In 2021, a major corporate change was foreshadowed when Aurizon sought to acquire rail operator One Rail Australia. The corporate regulator, the Australian Competition and Consumer Commission, approved the sale subject to One Rail Australia's coal-haulage business in New South Wales and Queensland being divested. Aurizon's purchase of One Rail Australia's assets not subject to divestiture occurred in July 2022. Divestiture of the remaining assets occurred on sale to Magnetic Rail Group on 17 February 2023.

The company in 2023 was Australia's largest rail-based transport business, transporting more than 250 million tonnes (246 million long tons) of commodities per year.

== QR National ==
QR National logo (2004–2010)

The QR National brand was established in the 2004-05 financial year when Queensland Rail's coal, bulk and containerised business units were brought under one banner.

The company's major traffic at the time was coal, both for export and domestic power generation, in Queensland. In 2005, QR National started to operate export coal services in the New South Wales Hunter Valley. By 2008, its operations extended across the entire mainland other than the Northern Territory when their first Melbourne–Perth intermodal container service started. In August 2008, QR National took over the operation of Melbourne–Horsham container service for Wimmera Container Line, after Pacific National withdrew its service.

== Public float ==
QR National logo (2010–2012)

In 2009, the Queensland Government announced that Queensland Rail's commercial activities were to be separated from the government's core passenger service responsibilities, formed into a new company named QR National Limited, and privatised. The new company was incorporated the following year, taking:

- the coal business in Queensland and New South Wales
- regional freight business in Queensland
- bulk mineral and grain haulage in Queensland and Western Australia
- containerised freight between Cairns, Brisbane, Sydney, Melbourne, Adelaide and Perth.

QR National obtained a 99-year lease over the 2300 kilometres (1400 miles) Queensland coal network, comprising:

- the Blackwater system around the Port of Gladstone
- the Goonyella system around the Port of Hay Point and Dalrymple Bay
- the Moura line to the Port of Gladstone, which transports coal from Moura Mine and Boundary Hill Mine
- the Newlands line to Port of Abbot Point, which transports coal from Newlands coal mine, Sonoma Mine, Collinsville coal mine and Carmichael coal mine

On acquiring the lease, QR National became responsible for the maintenance of the coal lines.

The rolling stock workshops at Redbank, Rockhampton and Townsville were included in the privatisation.

The float took place in November 2010.

In August 2021, Aurizon signed a six year agreement with CBH Group (with two options to extend for a further two years) to provide rail haulage services for their grain trains. Although scheduled to transition in May 2022, all parties agreed to bring the handover date forward to September 2021. Aurizon had already been informally providing rail haulage services in the Geraldton region since mid-2021. .

In February 2022, Aurizon commenced a five-year contract to haul mineral sands from Broken Hill to Kwinana for Tronox, to be extended 320 km east to Ivanhoe, where a new loading facility has been constructed.

== Re-branding as Aurizon ==
Following a vote by its shareholders, in 2012 QR National was rebranded as Aurizon. The CEO at the time, Lance Hockridge, said the new name derived from the words Australia and horizon. Marketers opined that the name was "a nearly perfect example of all that can go wrong with a rebranding" and that it was "a classic case of people making a weird hybrid name to try and make it unique and interesting so that people will remember it. This is not true: people don't remember made-up words."

== Company sales and purchases ==
In 2005, QR National incorporated a subsidiary, Interail, which had been acquired in 2002 and operated in New South Wales.

In the same year, QR National acquired logistics company CRT Group, for which it already provided line haulage.

In 2006, QR National acquired Australian Railroad Group (ARG), which operated in New South Wales, South Australia and Western Australia. ARG remained a separate subsidiary operation until it was rebranded as QR National in 2011.

In 2007, the company acquired the Golden Bros Group.

In 2019, after a Federal Court judgement, Aurizon's intermodal and trucking business was acquired by Linfox for A$7.3 million.

=== Purchase of One Rail Australia non-coal assets ===
In October 2021, Aurizon agreed terms to purchase One Rail Australia. The transaction was approved in July 2022 by the Australian Competition and Consumer Commission (ACCC) after the commission accepted Aurizon's court-enforceable undertaking to dispose of the seller's Hunter Valley coal haulage and Queensland coal haulage business to maintain competition levels. The ACCC Chair, Gina Cass-Gottlieb, said: "We are also satisfied that the divestment of One Rail's east coast business would preserve it as a potential competitor to Aurizon for the supply of non-coal bulk rail haulage in the future, and Aurizon would continue to be constrained by a number of existing bulk rail haulage competitors.” The sale was completed on 29 July 2022, and Aurizon took over One Rail Australia's South Australian, Northern Territory and interstate operations the following day under the brand, "Aurizon Bulk Central".

In December 2022, Aurizon agreed to an offer by Magnetic Rail Group Pty Ltd to purchase the divested assets. The buyer was to pay about $A425 million ($US284.3 million) – the equity value of the east coast business – and assume existing debt facilities, which originally totalled $A500 million. Proceeds$, A125 million of which was to be deferred for 12 months, would be used initially to reduce Aurizon's debt and would form part of Aurizon's available capital. After the ACCC gave regulatory approval, the sale was completed on 17 February 2023.

== Price regulation ==
As Aurizon's infrastructure was a monopoly, it was subject in 2018 to regulation by government organisations including the Queensland Competition Authority. Aurizon disputed the price that it should be allowed to charge its clients – for example when the Authority used a lower weighted average cost of capital that did not account for the risk that clean energy poses to fossil fuel.

== Events after purchase of ORA non-coal assets ==
On 20 February 2023, Aurizon announced it had re-entered the interstate intermodal market on being awarded a A$1.8 billion 11-year contract with Team Global Express (formerly Toll Global Express) – the largest non-coal contract in the history of the company. The company stated that services would begin in April 2023 and that by April 2024, five weekly services would run east–west (Melbourne–Sydney–Adelaide–Perth); two would run north–south (Brisbane–Sydney–Melbourne). The first revenue service of this contract departed Melbourne for Perth on 8 April.

In March 2023, Aurizon and Viterra proposed that the Australian federal government supply A$220 million in funding to repair and upgrade the Eyre Peninsula Railway lines. The proposal included re-opening the Port Lincoln–Wudinna and Cummins-Kimba lines and upgrading the outloading facilities at Viterra's Lock, Wudinna, Cummins, Kimba and Rudall sites. An annual target of at least 1.3 million tonnes of grain haulage was estimated. Aurizon and Viterra planned to have the network reopened within 12 months if funding were approved.

== East coast container service ==
In February 2023, Aurizon inaugurated two Melbourne–Perth containerised freight services and in September 2023 a weekly return container service on the Melbourne-Sydney–Brisbane corridor in collaboration with its customer, Team Global Express.

== Accidents ==
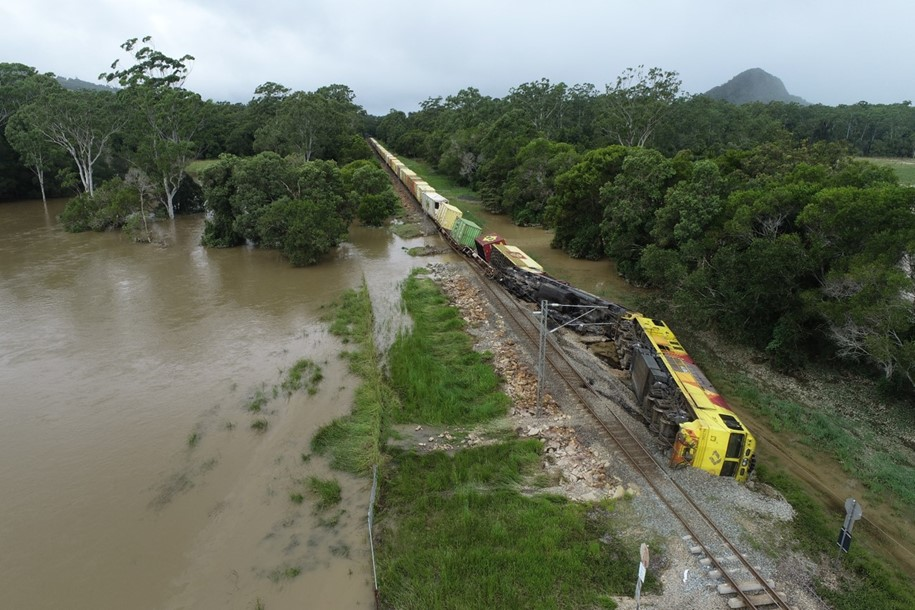
Derailed Aurizon freight train at Traveston, February 2022

On 23 February 2022, during the 2022 eastern Australia floods, freight train Y279 derailed at approximately 3:30am, due to a track washout at the 149.020 km point, just south of Traveston, Queensland.

== Locomotive fleet ==
Class	Image	Type	Top speed (km/h)	Built	Number	Business unit	Use and area of operation	Notes
1435 mm (4 ft 8 1/2 in) Standard gauge fleet
3200 class		Diesel-electric	100	1995–1998	3	Aurizon Bulk East	New South Wales	Ex-QR National. Regauged from 3 ft 6 in (1,067 mm) gauge.
422 class		Diesel-electric	115	1969–1970	7	Aurizon Bulk Central/West	South Australia/Northern Territory/Western Australia	4 Ex One Rail Australia. 3 Stored at Forrestfield.
5000 class		Diesel-electric	80	2005–2007	12	Aurizon Coal	Hunter Valley coal	Ex-QR National.
5020 class		Diesel-electric	80	2010–2014	25	Aurizon Coal	Hunter Valley coal	Improved version of 5000 class.
6000 class		Diesel-electric	115	2009	12	Aurizon Coal	Hunter Valley coal	Ex-QR National.
6020 class		Diesel-electric	115	2012	9	Aurizon Coal	Hunter Valley coal	6022, 6023 & 6025 allocated to Bulk Central/Intermodal.
6040 class		Diesel-electric	115	2017–2018	5	Aurizon Coal	Hunter valley coal	
AC class		Diesel-electric	115	2009	8	Aurizon Bulk West	Western Australia	Ex Australian Railroad Group.
ACB class		Diesel-electric	115	2011	6	Aurizon Bulk West	Western Australia	Ex Australian Railroad Group.
ACC class		Diesel-electric	115	2013	3	Aurizon Bulk West	Western Australia	ACC6032 Allocated to Bulk Central/Intermodal.
ACD class		Diesel-electric	115	2022-2023	15	Aurizon Bulk Central/East	NSW, Interstate mineral sands	ACD6050 - ACD6055 allocated to Intermodal.
ALF/ ALZ class		Diesel-electric	115	1976	8	Aurizon Bulk Central	South Australia/Northern Territory	1 Ex Australian Railroad Group, Scrapped. 7 Ex One Rail Australia.
CF class		Diesel-electric	115	2012–2013	2	Aurizon Coal	Hunter Valley coal	Ex CFCL Australia.
CL class		Diesel-electric	115	1970	6	Aurizon Bulk Central	South Australia/Northern Territory	Ex One Rail Australia.
FQ class		Diesel-electric	115	2003	4	Aurizon Bulk Central	South Australia/Northern Territory	Ex One Rail Australia.
G class		Diesel-electric	115	1981-1989	2	Aurizon Bulk Central	South Australia/Northern Territory	Ex One Rail Australia.
GM class		Diesel-electric	115	1965-1967	9	Aurizon Bulk Central	South Australia/Northern Territory	Ex One Rail Australia. 7 stored.
GWA class		Diesel-electric	115	2011-2012	9	Aurizon Bulk Central	South Australia/Northern Territory	Ex One Rail Australia.
GWB class		Diesel-electric	115	2019-2022	6	Aurizon Bulk Central	South Australia/Northern Territory	3 ex One Rail Australia, 3 delivered to Aurizon.
GWU class		Diesel-electric	115	2020-2021	4	Aurizon Bulk Central	South Australia/Northern Territory	Ex One Rail Australia.
J class		Diesel-electric	115	1966	2	Aurizon Bulk Central	Northern Territory - Alice Springs	Ex One Rail Australia 2x Former Alice Springs Shunt Locos, now stored in Dry Creek with mechanical troubles and vandalism damage from Alice Springs.
L class		Diesel-electric	115	1967	1	Aurizon Bulk West	Western Australia	Ex Australian Railroad Group, 1 stored.
LQ class		Diesel-electric	115	1967	1	Aurizon Bulk West	Western Australia	1 Ex Australian Railroad Group stored at Avon Yard. 1 Ex Interail scrapped in 2016 due to an accident.
LZ class		Diesel-electric	115	1967	6	Aurizon Bulk West	Western Australia	Ex Australian Railroad Group.
Q class		Diesel-electric	115	1997-1998	19	Aurizon Bulk West	Western Australia	Ex Australian Railroad Group.
V class		Diesel-electric	115	2002	1	Aurizon Bulk Central	South Australia/Northern Territory	Ex One Rail Australia.
Queensland 1067 mm (3 ft 6 in) narrow-gauge fleet
1720 class		Diesel-electric	80	1966–1970	28	Aurizon Bulk East	General freight and shunting	16 other units sold to South Africa in 2012, 8 stored.
2000 class		Railmotor	80	1960–1970	2	Aurizon Network	Queensland network track inspections	Nos. 2004 and 2032.
2100 class		Diesel-electric	80	1970–1984	53	Aurizon Bulk East	General freight and minerals	5 other units transferred to Western Australia as the DD class, 4 other units sold to TasRail in 2011, 3 to South Africa in 2012, 2 stored for parts.
2300 class		Diesel-electric	100	1997–2002	51	Aurizon Bulk East	General freight and minerals, 7 other units in Western Australia as DFZ class (see below)	Rebuilt from 1550 class.
2400 class		Diesel-electric	100	1977–1980	38	Aurizon Bulk East	General freight and minerals	18 converted to 2300 class 1 stored.
2700 class		Diesel-electric	110	2019–2020	6 in service	Aurizon Bulk East	General freight and minerals	These locomotives are dubbed the Super Clyde. These are rebuilt from older locomotives.
2800 class		Diesel-electric	100	1995–1998	46	Aurizon Bulk East	General freight and minerals	3 other units on standard gauge, 1 other unit in Western Australia as PA class.
4000 class		Diesel-electric	100	2000–2005	49	Aurizon Coal	Blackwater and Moura coal networks	4020 scrapped.
4100 class		Diesel-electric	100	2007–2012	56	Aurizon Coal	Blackwater, Moura and Newlands coal networks	Originally 75 units, 19 units transferred to Western Australia as ACN class.
3100/3200 class		Electric	80	1986–1989	15	Aurizon Coal	Bowen Basin	63 rebuilt as 3700 class (see below), 4 other units sold to South Africa in 2012–2013, Remaining units scrapped during May and June 2016.
3300/3400 class		Electric	80	1994–1995	13	Aurizon Coal	Blackwater coal network	All Stored.
3500/3600 class		Electric	80	1986–1988	68	Aurizon Coal	Goonyella coal network	15 stored.
3551 class		Electric	80	2003–2004	14	Aurizon Coal	Blackwater coal network	Rebuilt from 3900 class.
3700 class		Electric	80	2005–2007	63	Aurizon Coal	Goonyella and Blackwater coal networks	Rebuilt from 3100/3200 class.
3800 class		Electric	80	2008–2010	45	Aurizon Coal	Goonyella and Blackwater coal networks	Ex-QR National.
3900 class		Electric	100	1988-90	11	Aurizon Coal	Blackwater coal network	All Stored.
Western Australia 1067 mm (3 ft 6 in) narrow-gauge fleet
ACN class		Diesel-electric	100	2011–2012	19	Aurizon Bulk West	Western Australia	Originally part of 4100 class, transferred to Western Australia and retained their original numbers.
DAZ Class		Diesel-electric	100	1972	1	Aurizon Bulk West	Western Australia	Stored at Forrestfield. 5 other locomotives exported to South Africa in 2015. 1 other unit converted into 1900 class and used on the iron ore narrow gauge Railways on South Australia. All converted from WAGR D Class diesel locomotives.
DBZ class		Diesel-electric	100	1982	3	Aurizon Bulk West	Western Australia	Ex Australian Railroad Group converted from DB class 10 sold to CBH group in 2017 (later sold to Watco Auatralia).
DFZ class		Diesel-electric	100	1971	7	Aurizon Bulk West	Western Australia	Converted from Queensland Railways 2300 Class.
P class		Diesel-electric	100	1989–1991	17	Aurizon Bulk West	Western Australia	Ex Australian Railroad Group.
PA class		Diesel-electric	100	1996	1	Aurizon Bulk West	Western Australia	Converted from Queensland Railways 2800 Class.
S class		Diesel-electric	90	1996	11	Aurizon Bulk West	Western Australia	Ex Australian Railroad Group.
South Australia 1067 mm (3 ft 6 in) narrow-gauge fleet
830 class		Diesel-electric	121	1960-1966	5	Aurizon Bulk Central	Thevenard, South Australia	Ex One Rail Australia, all stored. Last 2 operational units placed into storage April 2023 with the arrival of two 2300 class from Queensland.
900 class		Diesel-electric	121	1960-1966	7	Aurizon Bulk Central	Thevenard, South Australia	Ex One Rail Australia, all stored. Rebuilt from 830 and NSW 48 class locomotives. Last 3 operational units placed into storage April 2023 with the arrival of two 2300 class from Queensland.
1200 class		Diesel-electric	100	1960-1967	2	Aurizon Bulk Central	Thevenard, South Australia	Ex One Rail Australia, ex WAGR A Class. Stored serviceable as backup units for the Gypsum train.
1300 class		Diesel-electric	Unknown	1956-1965	4	Aurizon Bulk Central	Whyalla, South Australia	Ex One Rail Australia, ex BHP Whyalla DE Class.
1600 class		Diesel-electric	Unknown	1971	3	Aurizon Bulk Central	Thevenard, South Australia	Ex One Rail Australia, formerly the NJ class. 3 stored, 2 stored serviceable as backup locos for the 2300 class in Thevenard.
2250 class		Diesel-electric	100	2004-2007	5	Aurizon Bulk Central	Whyalla, South Australia	Ex One Rail Australia, repatriated from South Africa in 2019 and owned by Aurizon beforehand.
2300 class		Diesel-electric	100	1997–2002	2	Aurizon Bulk Central	Thevenard, South Australia	2332 and 2364 trucked to Thevenard in March 2023. Both entered service on 13/04/2023.
CK class		Diesel-electric	100	1967-1968	4	Aurizon Bulk Central	Whyalla, South Australia	Ex One Rail Australia, former Victorian Railways T class.

== Former fleet ==
Details of Aurizon's former fleet are as follows:

Class	Image	Type	Gauge	Top speed (km/h)	Built	Number	Business unit	Use and area of operation	Notes
421 class		Diesel-electric	Standard	115	1965–1966	5	Aurizon	Intermodal freight, Grain	Ex Interail, 4 stored.
423 class		Diesel-electric	Standard	112	1967–1969	6	Aurizon	Intermodal freight, Hunter Valley Coal, Grain	Renumber QR 1502 NSW.
500 class		Diesel-electric	Standard	80	1964	1	Aurizon	Shunting, South Australia	Ex Australian Railroad Group; donated to SteamRanger in October 2010.
830 class		Diesel-electric	Narrow	115	1963	1	Aurizon Bulk Freight West	Western Australia	Ex Australian Railroad Group; sold to Junee Railway Workshop in 2012.
2600 class		Diesel-electric	Narrow	100	1983	13	Aurizon	Queensland coal and minerals	Exported to South Africa in 2012.
