= Queensland Railways 3100/3200 class =

Class of Australian Bo′Bo′Bo′ electric locomotives

Queensland Rail 3100/3200 class
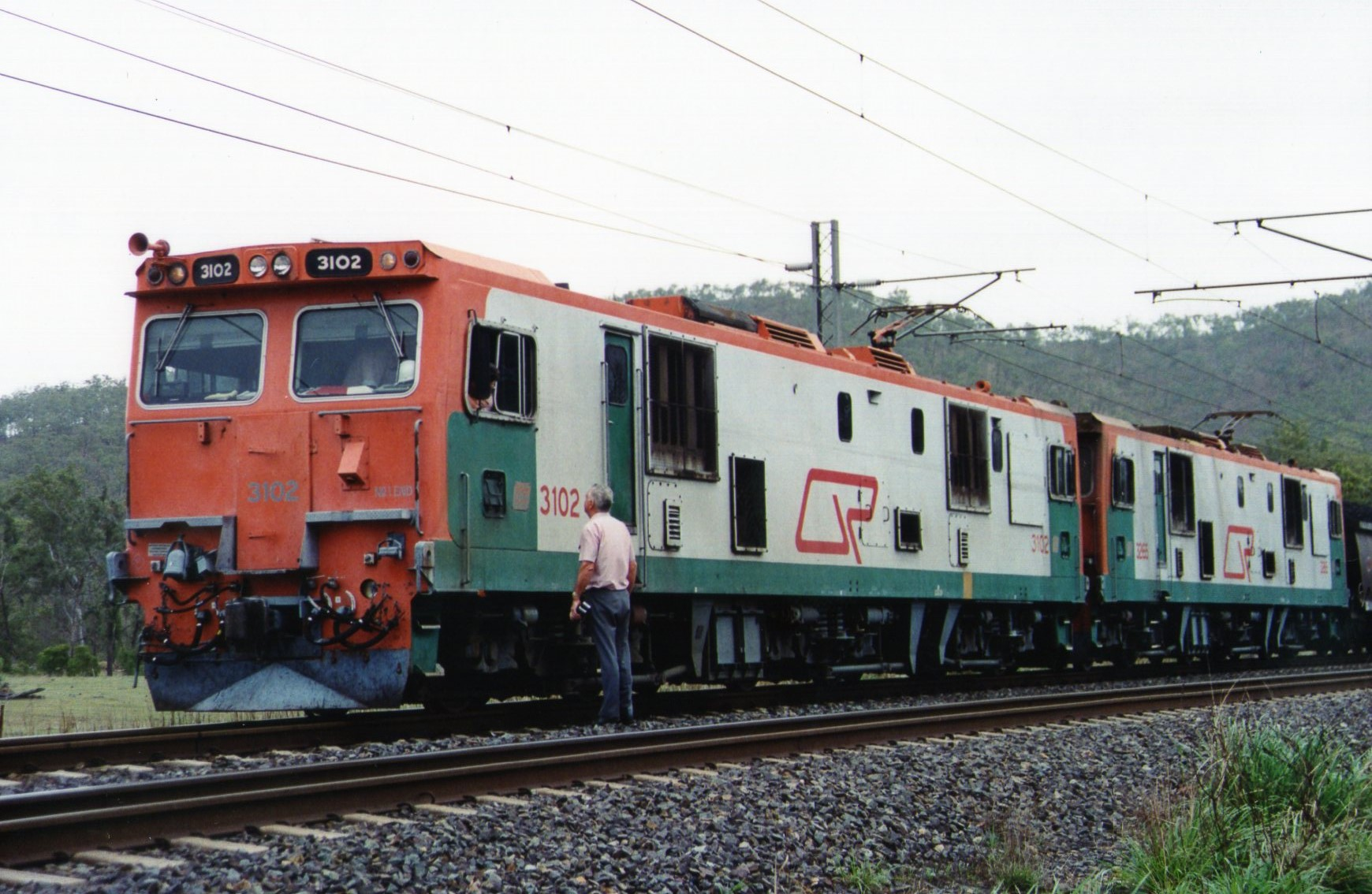
- 3102 & 3255 on the Goonyella railway line in 1991
Type and origin
- Power type: Electric
- Builder: Comeng, Rocklea; Hitachi
- Model: CL 6 29
- Build date: 1986-1989
- Total produced: 86
- Rebuilder: United Group, Townsville & Broadmeadow
- Rebuild date: 2003-2007
- Number rebuilt: 63
Specifications
- Configuration
  - UIC: Bo-Bo-Bo
- Gauge: 1,067 mm (3 ft 6 in)
- Length: 19.38 m (63 ft 7 in)
- Width: 2.72 m (8 ft 11 in)
- Height: 3.9 m (12 ft 10 in)
- Loco weight: 109.8 t (108.1 long tons; 121.0 short tons)
- Electric system/s: 25 kV AC
- Current pickup: Pantograph
- Traction motors: Hitachi 12254
- Transmission: Electric
- MU working: Yes
- Loco brake: Air braked
- Train brakes: Davies and Metcalfe P85
Performance figures
- Maximum speed: 80 km/h (50 mph)
- Power output: 2,900 kW (3,900 hp)
Career
- Operators: Queensland Rail
- Class: 3100/3200
- Number in class: 86
- Numbers: 3101–3104, 3108, 3112, 3116, 3120, 3124, 3128, 3132, 3136, 3144, 3148, 3152, 3160, 3164, 3168, 3205–3207, 3209–3211, 3213–3215, 3217–3219, 3221–3223, 3225–3227, 3229–3231, 3233–3235, 3237–3239, 3241–3243, 3245–3247, 3249–3251, 3253–3255, 3257–3259, 3261–3263, 3265–3267, 3269–3286
- Delivered: 26 May 1986
- Current owner: Aurizon, SNCC

The 3100/3200 class are a class of electric locomotives built by Comeng Rocklea and Hitachi for Queensland Rail between 1986 and 1989.

== History ==
In July 1984, Comeng were awarded a contract to build 76 3100/3200 class electric locomotives with Hitachi supplying the electrical equipment. These were ordered to operate coal trains on the Blackwater and Goonyella railway lines that were in the process of being electrified. A further ten were later ordered.

Design of the electrical equipment was by General Electric and Hitachi, with the bodies being built and assembled at Comeng's Rocklea factory.

The first locomotive, 3101 Sir Joh Bjelke-Petersen, was delivered on 26 May 1986.

All were fitted with Locotrol systems that allowed remote control locomotives in the centre of a train to be controlled from a command unit. Thus two separate classes were built, 19 class 3100 command units that could lead trains, and 67 class 3200 slave units.

In early 1997, four were fitted with ten tonnes (9.8 long tons; 11 short tons) of ballast to increase their tractive effort.

== 3700 class ==
In March 2003, a contract was awarded to Siemens Mobility for the rebuilding of three 3200 class locomotives as CL 6 40m prototypes for a proposed rebuild of the entire class. The work was undertaken at United Group, Townsville.

Deemed a success, it was decided to rebuild 60 more at United Group's Townsville and Broadmeadow factories. The weight and dimensions of the 3100 class meant that they had to have components removed at the Jilalan Depot, Mackay before they could be moved by rail to Townsville. These components were used both for spare parts for the rest of the 3100/3200 class and to allow a reduction in weight to comply with mainline track restrictions.

At Townsville, the locomotives were stripped down to the body shell with all internal components removed. The bodies were then sandblasted and any minor defects were repaired. They were rebuilt with only one cab, with the redundant cab enclosed with steel plating.

Bodies were then transported by road to Broadmeadow for rebuilding. There are several major changes to the locomotives. These include now using AC traction motors, distributed power locotrol system instead of Locotrol II, increased weight and increased traction effort.

With the increased tractive effort, the number of locomotives on each train has decreased from five to three locomotives on the Goonyella network.
