= JGR Class 3900 =

Japanese 0-6-0 type steam locomotive

Class 3900
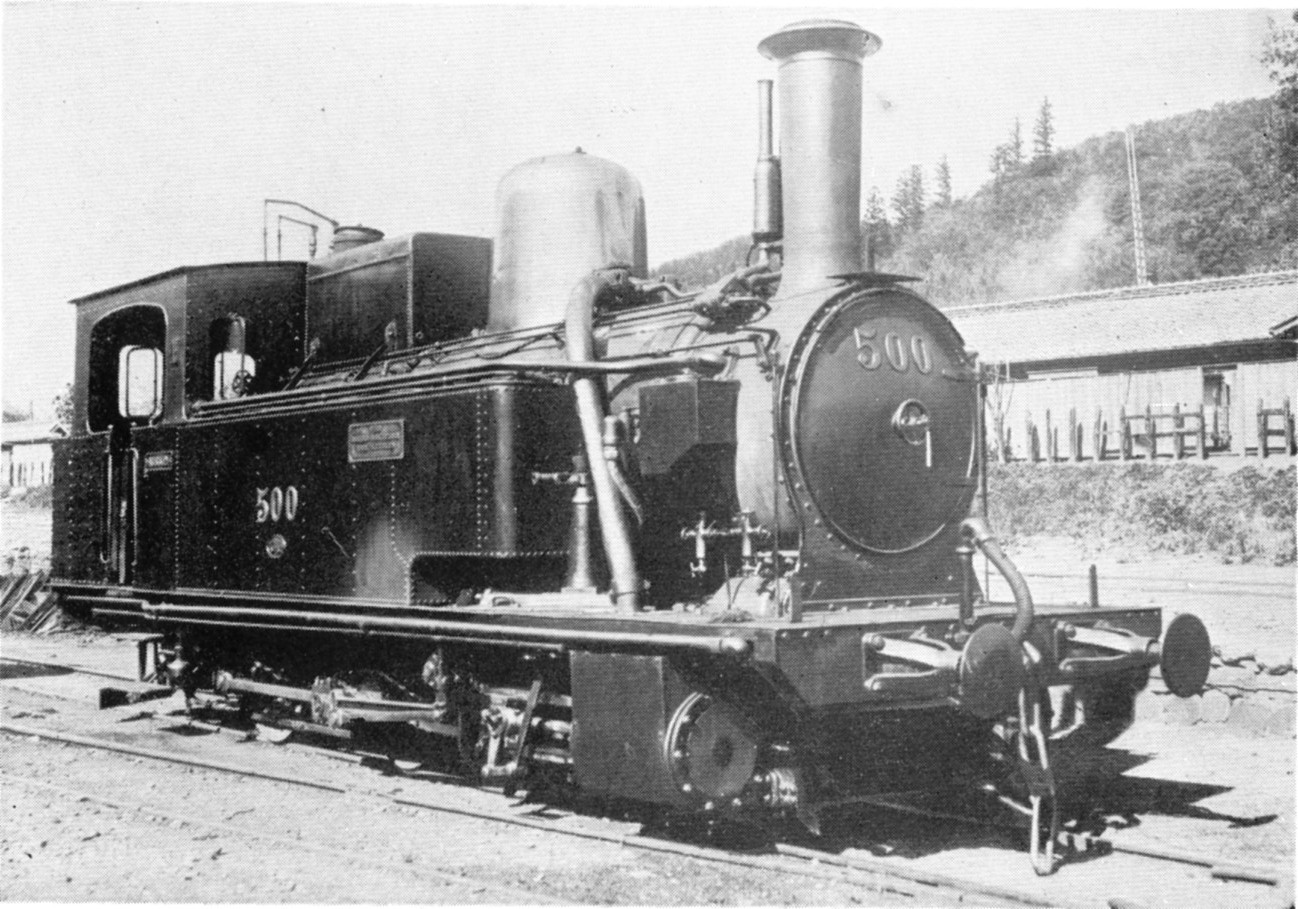
- 3900 type locomotive
Type and origin
- Power type: Steam
- Builder: Maschinenfabrik Esslingen
- Build date: 1892
- Total produced: 7
Specifications
- Configuration
  - Whyte: 0-6-0T
- Gauge: 1,067 mm (3 ft 6 in)
- Driver dia.: 900 mm (2 ft 11 in)
- Wheelbase: 3.6 m (11 ft 10 in)
- Length: 9.1 m (29 ft 10 in)
- Loco weight: 35.5 t
- Fuel type: Coal with heavy oil
- Fuel capacity: 1 t
- Water cap.: 3.5 m^{3} (925 US gal)
- Firebox
  - Grate area: 1.73 m^{2} (19 sq ft)
- Boiler pressure: 176.5 lbf/in^{2} (12.41 kg/cm^{2})
- Heating surface: 75 m^{2} (807 sq ft)
- Cylinders: Two
- Cylinder size: 39 cm × 50 cm (15 in × 20 in)
- Valve gear: Walschaerts
Career
- Retired: 1922
- Disposition: All scrapped

The JGR Class 3900 was a type of 0-6-0T steam locomotive used on Japanese Government Railways. The locomotives were imported from Germany for the 11.2 km (7.0 miles) Abt rack railway system which traversed the Usui Pass on the Shin'etsu Main Line between Yokokawa Station in Annaka, Gunma and Karuizawa Station in Karuizawa, Nagano.

== See also ==
- Japan Railways locomotive numbering and classification
