= Australian National AL class =

Class of Australian diesel-electric locomotives

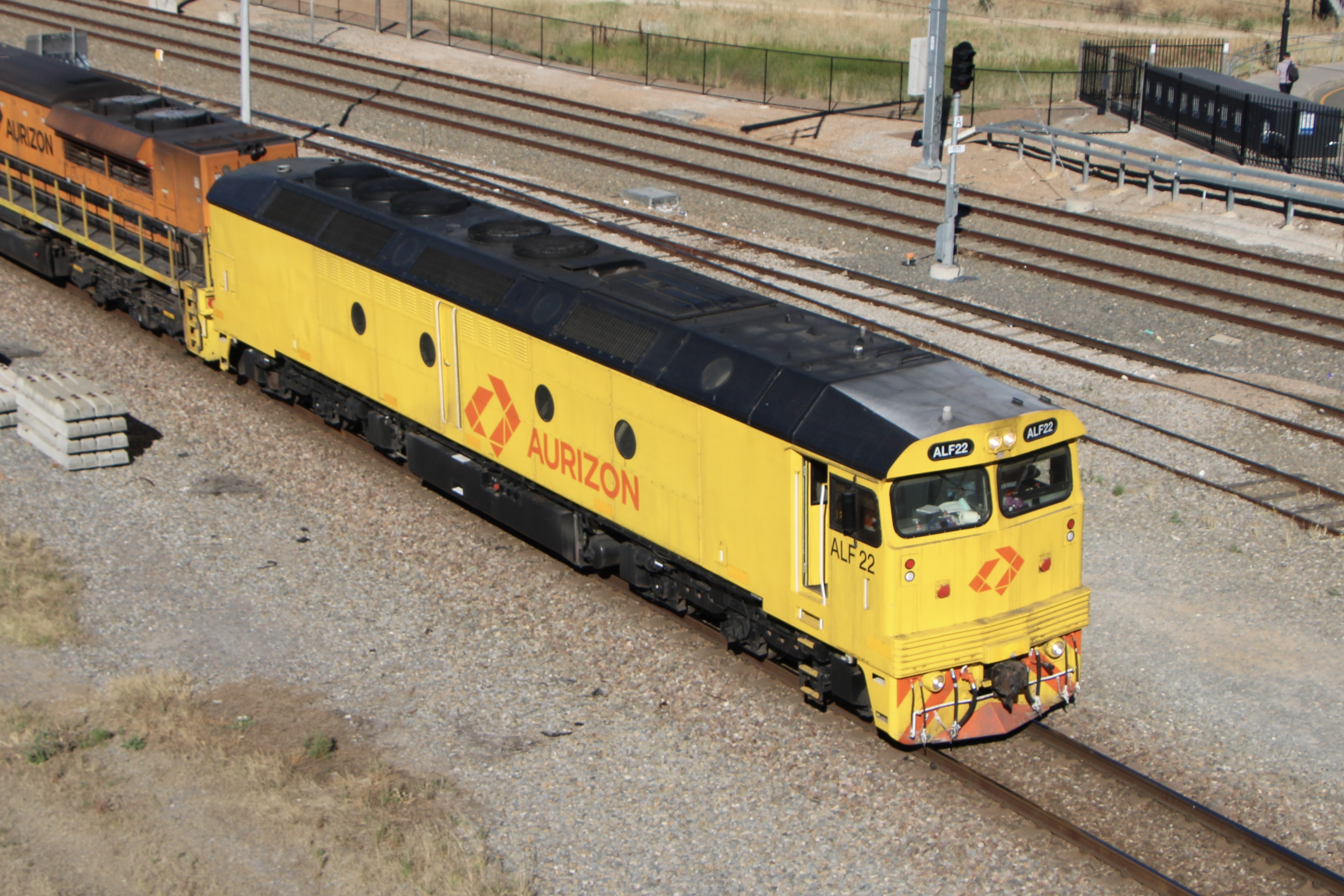
- ALF22 (formerly AL23) in the latest Aurizon livery at Mawson Lakes, January 2026
Type and origin
- Power type: Diesel-electric
- Builder: Clyde Engineering, Rosewater
- Serial number: 76-834 to 76-841
- Model: JT26C (AL) JT26C-2M (ALF)
- Build date: 1976–1977
- Total produced: 8
- Rebuilder: Morrison Knudsen Australia
- Rebuild date: 1994
- Number rebuilt: 8
Specifications
- Configuration
  - UIC: Co-Co
- Gauge: 1,435 mm (4 ft 8 1/2 in) standard gauge
- Length: 20.6 m (67 ft 7 in)
- Fuel type: Diesel
- Prime mover: Electro-Motive Diesel 16-645E3 (AL); Electro-Motive Diesel 16-645E3C (ALF)
- Engine type: V16 Two-stroke diesel
- Aspiration: Turbocharged
- Cylinders: 16
Performance figures
- Power output: 2,237 kW (3,000 hp) (AL); 2,460 kW (3,300 hp) (ALF)
Career
- Operators: Aurizon
- Number in class: 6
- Numbers: AL18-AL25
- Delivered: October 1976
- First run: October 1976
- Last run: August 1977
- Current owner: Aurizon
- Disposition: 6 in service, 2 scrapped

The AL class are a class of diesel locomotives built by Clyde Engineering, Rosewater for Australian National in 1976–1977. They were mechanically similar to the CL class but instead of a bulldog nose had two flat ended cabs, similar to the 422 class built for the New South Wales Government Railways in 1969.

== History ==
The AL class initially operated services on the Trans-Australian Railway from Broken Hill to Kalgoorlie, their sphere of operation being extended to Alice Springs and Adelaide when these lines were converted to standard gauge in 1980 and 1983. Although capable of hauling passenger services, they tended to be restricted to slower freight trains to minimise track pounding due to their weight.

Three were loaned to the NSW Public Transport Commission in 1979 resulting in 80 mechanically similar class 81s being ordered in 1980. From July 1990, through working into New South Wales was introduced resulting in ALs operating services beyond Broken Hill to Lithgow.

In 2004, they began to operate to Darwin following this line opening.

== Remanufacturing ==
In August 1992, Australian National awarded Morrison Knudsen Australia a contract to remanufacture the ALs at its Whyalla factory. As part of the deal Morrison Knudsen purchased the locomotives and leased them back to Australian National for 12 years.

The rebuilding in the first half of 1994 involved stripping back to the frame. Changes included the EMD 645E3 engines being replaced with overhauled EMD 645E3C engines imported from Morrison Knudsen in the US, removing the No 2 end cab and being reclassified as the ALF class. After rebuilding the locomotives did not retain their numbers, for example the first locomotive converted was AL21 which emerged as ALF18.

In 1994, Australian National's interstate services were transferred to National Rail. The lease with Morrison Knudsen meant the locomotives could only be used on Australian National trains, or a higher lease fee would apply. As a result, the class were not seen on National Rail operated trains, and did not venture onto the wider national standard gauge network until Australian National won hook and pull contracts for private operator SCT Logistics in July 1995.

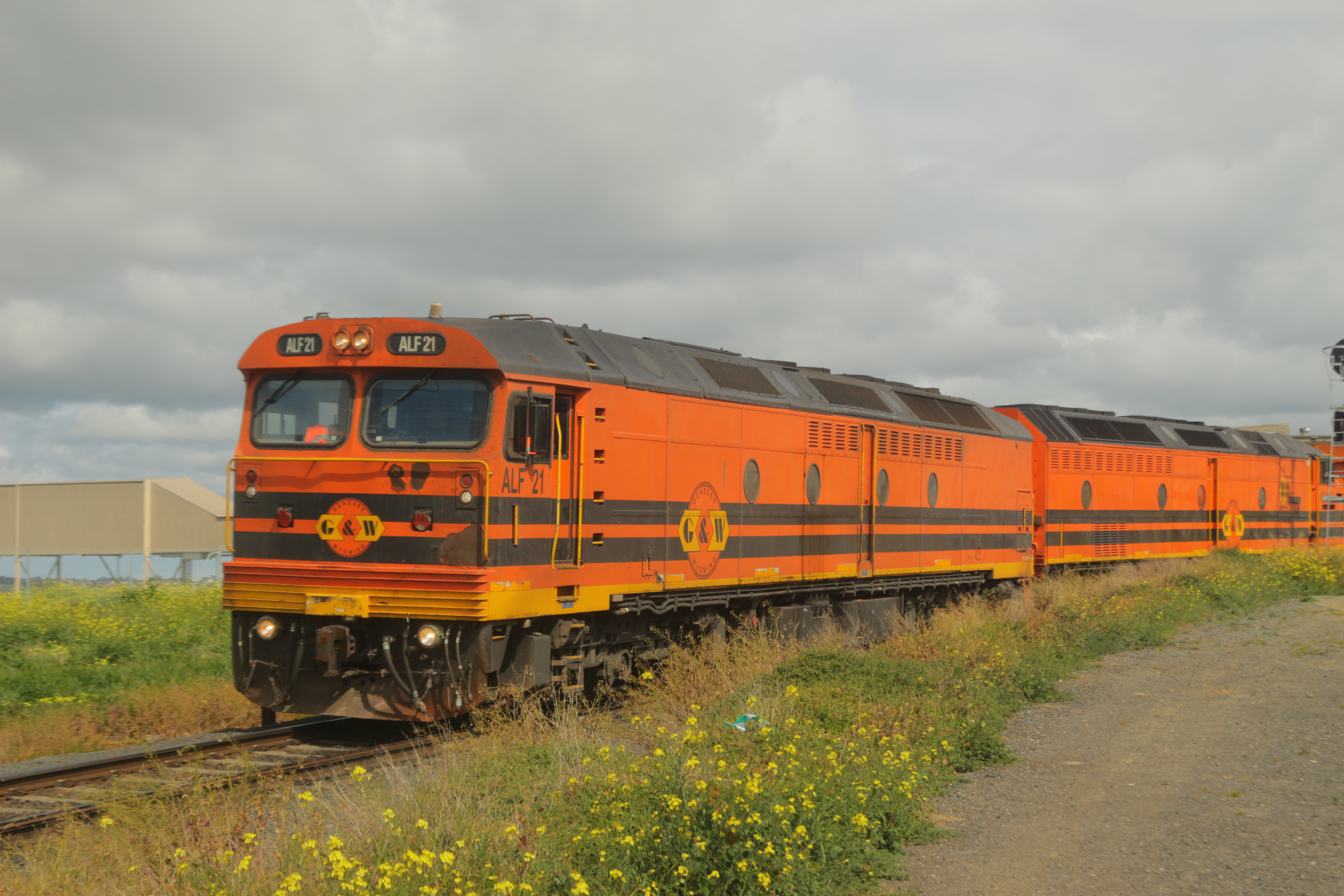
ALF21 in its previous G&W livery at North Geelong, September 2019

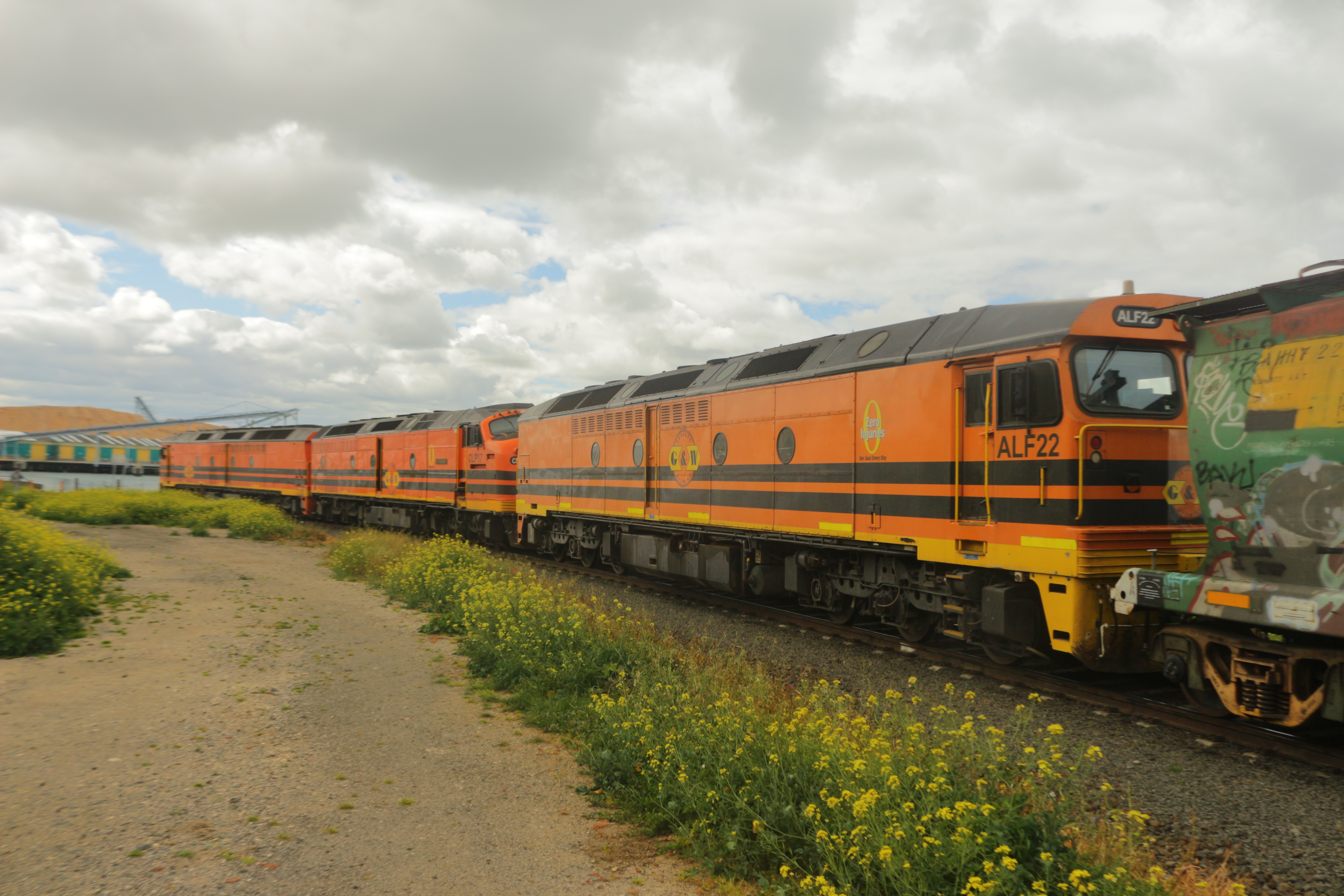
ALF22 in its previous G&W livery (light orange body & yellow pilot variant) at North Geelong, September 2019

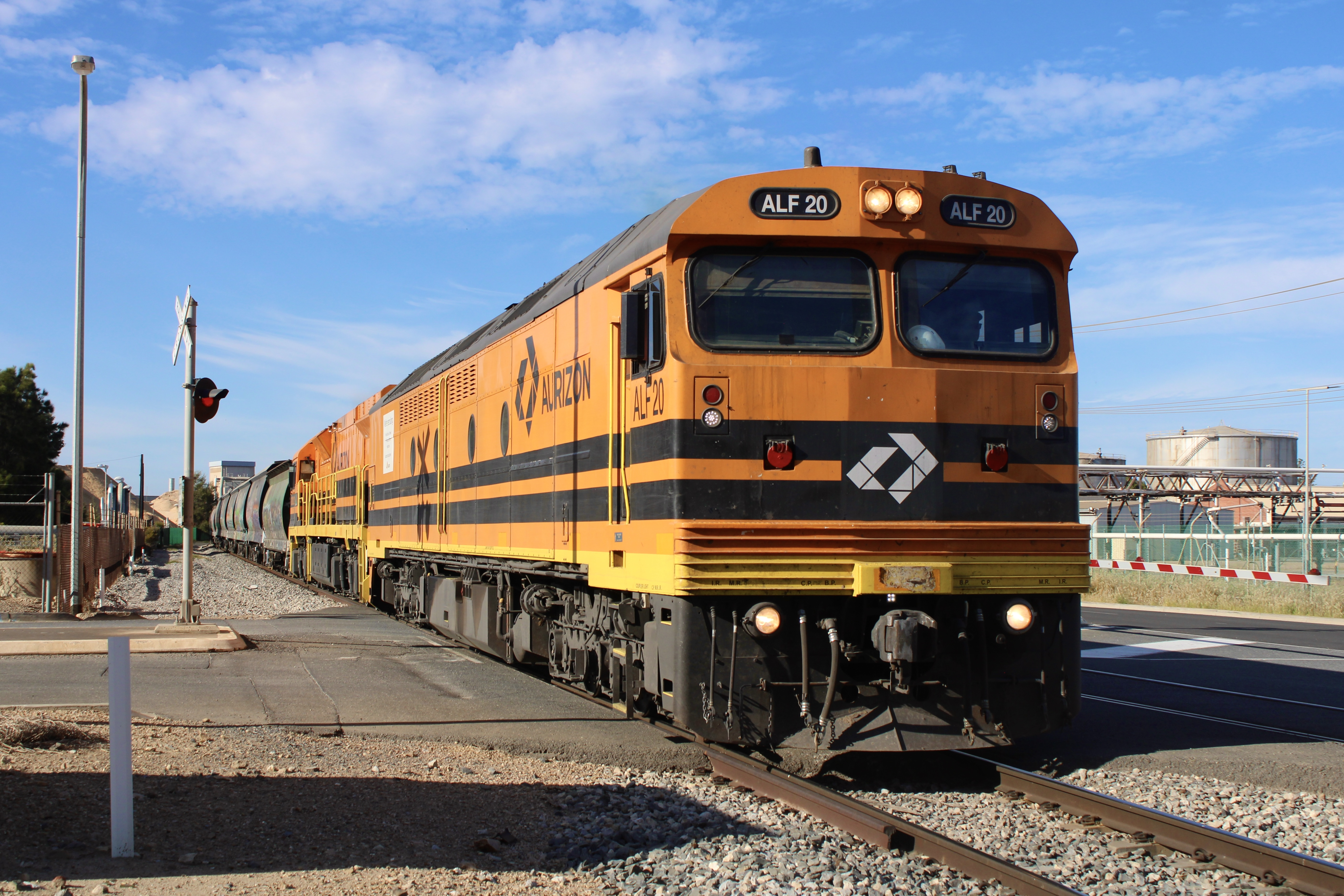
ALF20 with Aurizon logos at Largs Bay, February 2024

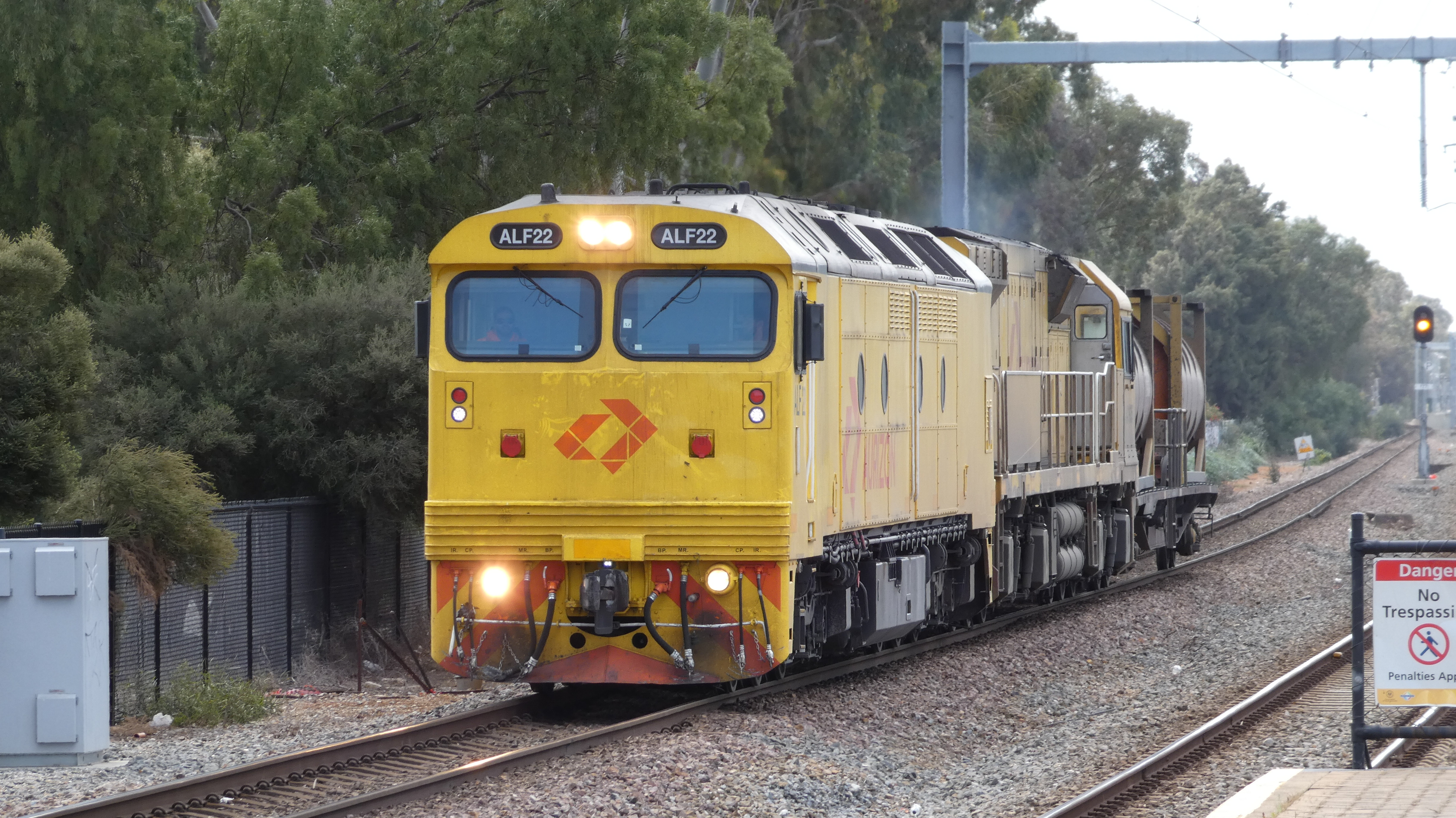
ALF22 in full Aurizon livery at Parafield Gardens, October 2025

== Private ownership ==
In November 1997, the AL class were sold to Australian Southern Railroad with Australian National's remaining freight operations. With the splitting up of the Australian Railroad Group (ARG) in June 2006, 7 went to Genesee & Wyoming Australia (later One Rail Australia) and 1, ALF25 remained with ARG, coming under QR National's (later Aurizon) ownership when ARG ceased trading as a separate brand in 2011.

The sole QRN/Aurizon ALF at the time, ALF25 was later renumbered to ALZ3208 and last used in Western Australia, being scrapped there in 2016. Later, the 7 remaining ALFs came under Aurizon's ownership in July 2022 as part of their purchase of One Rail Australia.

== Current operations ==
Aurizon operate the ALF Class locomotives on multiple different trains based out of Adelaide (Motive Power Centre). Such services include Intermodal services between Adelaide and Darwin, Grain (from multiple locations throughout South Australia and Western Victoria) and previously on Ore (on the 1911S/9112S Wirrida Ore train). Overhauls of the class were undertaken from 2020 - 2024 by One Rail Australia (ORA) and later Aurizon, with all members of the class receiving an overhaul.

While the earlier ORA overhauls involved a repaint into orange and black (similar to the G&W livery), Aurizon applied its full corporate livery (a predominantly yellow appearance) to the last 3 overhauls, with ALF23 emerging in 2022, ALF24 in 2023, and ALF22 in 2024. The livery was adjusted from ALF24 onwards to include a fully black roof. As of June 2026, ALFs 18,19 and 20 remained with the ORA orange livery with Aurizon stickers.

On 14 June 2023 ALF21 along with GWA003 and a handful of wagons, was written off following a level crossing collision with a semi trailer in the outskirts of Katherine, Northern Territory. All 4 Aurizon crew members involved in the collision escaped with only minor injuries.

== Fleet list ==
| Key: | In service | Stored | Preserved | Converted | Under overhaul | Scrapped |

| Original no | Entered service | Livery | Rebuilt no | Name | Owner | Status |
|---|---|---|---|---|---|---|
| AL18 | October 1976 | ORA Orange & Black (with Aurizon Logos) | ALF19 | | Aurizon | Operational |
| AL19 | October 1976 | AN Green & Yellow (with ARG logos) | ALZ3208 (ex ALF25) | | Aurizon | Scrapped |
| AL20 | November 1976 | ORA Orange & Black | ALF21 | | Aurizon | Scrapped |
| AL21 | December 1976 | ORA Orange & Black (with Aurizon Logos) | ALF18 | City of Port Pirie | Aurizon | Operational |
| AL22 | June 1977 | Aurizon Yellow with black roof | ALF24 | | Aurizon | Operational |
| AL23 | July 1977 | Aurizon Yellow with black roof | ALF22 | | Aurizon | Operational |
| AL24 | July 1977 | ORA Orange & Black (with Aurizon Logos) | ALF20 | | Aurizon | Operational |
| AL25 | August 1977 | Aurizon Yellow without black roof | ALF23 | | Aurizon | Operational |
