= Queensland Competition Authority =

Statutory authority overview
- Formed: 1997
- Jurisdiction: State of Queensland
- Headquarters: Level 27, 145 Ann Street, Brisbane
- Minister responsible: Cameron Dick, Treasurer
- Statutory authority executives: Prof Flavio Menezes, chair; Madeline Brennan QC, deputy chair; Dr Warren Mundy, board member; Fiona Guthrie, board member
- Key document: Queensland Competition Authority Act, 1997
- Website: https://www.qca.org.au/

The Queensland Competition Authority (QCA) is an independent statutory authority that promotes competition as the basis for enhancing efficiency and growth in the Queensland economy. It was established by the Government of Queensland in 1997.

The QCA is governed by a four-member board. The Minister responsible for administering the Queensland Competition Authority Act 1997 (the QCA Act) is the Treasurer of Queensland.

== Functions ==
The QCA's primary role is to ensure monopoly businesses operating in Queensland, particularly in the provision of key infrastructure, do not abuse their market power through unfair pricing or restrictive access arrangements.

== Responsibilities ==
The QCA's main responsibilities under the QCA Act are:

=== Monopoly prices oversight ===
The QCA uses pricing and other regulatory arrangements, based on sound economic and commercial principles, to encourage monopoly businesses to operate responsibly in the absence of normal competitive market forces.

Price oversight prevents government and non-government monopolies or near-monopolies from abusing their market power by charging excessive prices for their products or services – because they either have no competitors or existing ones are ineffective.

The QCA may investigate the pricing practices of such monopolies or monitor their pricing practices, depending on the referral from the Queensland Treasurer. The QCA only performs these functions on request from the Treasurer.

The monopoly prices oversight powers of the QCA enable consumers to enjoy market prices, while businesses still earn a reasonable investment return – thus ensuring a beneficial outcome.

=== Third party access ===
Essential infrastructure that underpins economic activity should be accessible to all potential users.

The QCA regulates third party access to essential infrastructure so as to support competition by enabling competitors (i.e. ‘third parties’) to access infrastructure that cannot be economically duplicated, such as electricity and gas distribution systems, water storage and distribution systems, rail tracks and ports. As an example, in the Queensland rail sector, they ensure track owned by Aurizon Holdings may also be used by other transport operators. This provides customers, such as coal miners, with options regarding the haulage of their product.

By opening up access, competition is enhanced in related markets such as electricity and gas retailing and rail transport.

=== Competitive neutrality ===
The principle of competitive neutrality requires that government business activities competing in the market with non-government or private-business activities do not gain an unfair competitive advantage by virtue of being government-owned.

Their potential advantage could result from being exempt from any of the following:

- Commonwealth or state taxes and tax equivalent payments
- Debt guarantee fees
- The procedural or regulatory requirements of the federal, state or local governments.

The principle of competitive neutrality does not extend to competitive advantage arising from factors such as business size, skills, location, or customer loyalty.

=== General issues ===
Apart from the specific responsibilities outlined above, the QCA has a range of general responsibilities. In particular, under section 10(e) of the QCA Act, Ministers can direct the QCA to investigate and report on matters relating to competition and industry.

=== Responsibilities outside the QCA Act ===
The responsibilities, in addition to those under the QCA Act, include:

- Setting retail electricity prices under the Electricity Act 1994 for regional Queensland
- Enforcing customer protections under the Electricity Industry Code and the Gas Industry Code
- Applying competitive neutrality principles to local government business activities under the Local Government Act 2009.

== See also ==
- Australian Competition & Consumer Commission
- List of Queensland government agencies
