= Davies and Metcalfe =

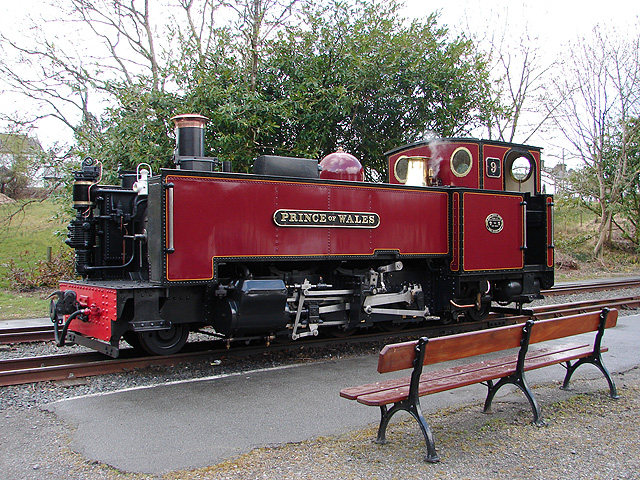
Swindon built GWR 2-6-2T at Devil's Bridge. The design was based on an earlier locomotive design by Davies and Metcalfe

Davies and Metcalfe Ltd is a railway equipment and locomotive manufacturer from Romiley, Manchester, England. It was founded in Aberystwyth in 1878. The company is now owned and run by Richard Charles Metcalfe and they continue to manufacture steam locomotive and traction engine parts from original drawings, as well as modern railway parts worldwide.

== History ==
=== Rheidol Foundry ===
James Metcalfe (1847–1920) was apprenticed to Sharp Stewart and worked for the company until 1867 before joining the Manchester and Milford Railway at Aberystwyth as locomotive foreman. Between 1875 and 1877 he took out three patents for an improved exhaust steam injector for steam locomotives and developed it with the financial support of David Davies "Llandinam" and Edward Hamer, the General Manager of the Manchester & Milford Railway. The Patent Exhaust Steam Injector Company was established at the Rheidol Foundry, Aberystwyth in April 1878.

=== Davies and Metcalfe ===
The company later moved to Romiley in the Metropolitan Borough of Stockport, Greater Manchester and changed its name to Davies and Metcalfe. It produced a range of locomotive engineering products including lubricators, exhaust steam injectors, vacuum brake ejectors etc. They later manufactured entire braking systems for locomotives and trains becoming one of the largest suppliers in the industry along with Westinghouse. Their products included brake tread units, drivers brake valves, distributors, air reservoirs, the 2A115 Series Air Compressor, electropneumatic valves, brake cylinders, and brake control units.

== Locomotives ==
The company built two 2-6-2T locomotives for the 1 ft 11 1/2 in (597 mm) gauge Vale of Rheidol Railway at Aberystwyth in 1902. They also renovated two locomotives for the North Wales Narrow Gauge Railway in 1902 (Snowdon Ranger) and 1903 (Moel Tryfan).

== Metcalfe-Oerlikon ==
Davies and Metcalfe had an arrangement with Oerlikon and sold railway air brake equipment under the name Metcalfe-Oerlikon. This was fitted to some British Railways diesel locomotives, e.g., Classes 45 and 46.
