= Blackwater railway system =

Australian coal railway

Blackwater System, Queensland

Overview
- Owner: Aurizon
- Locale: Queensland, Australia
- Termini: Callemondah (Gladstone); Gregory Mine
- Website: http://www.aurizon.com.au/

Service
- Type: Heavy Rail (Coal)
- Operator: Aurizon
- Depot: Callemondah

History
- Opened: 1967 (Kinrola branch)

Technical
- Line length: 1,111 km (690 mi)
- Track gauge: 1,067 mm (3 ft 6 in) Narrow gauge
- Electrification: 25 kV 50 Hz AC OHLE
- Operating speed: 80 km/h (50 mph)

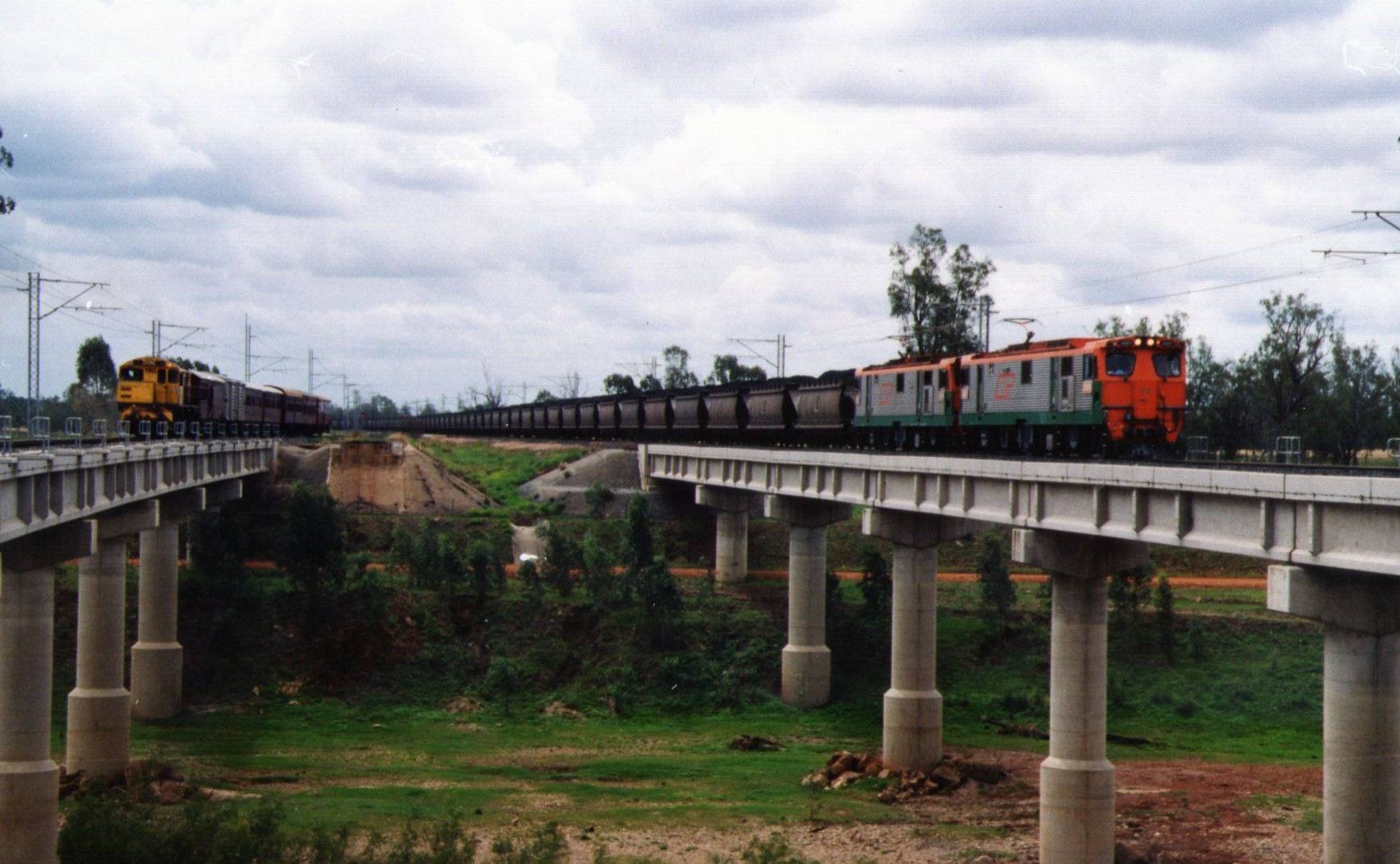
Two eastbound trains run parallel on a bidirectionally signalled duplicated section of the Central West line

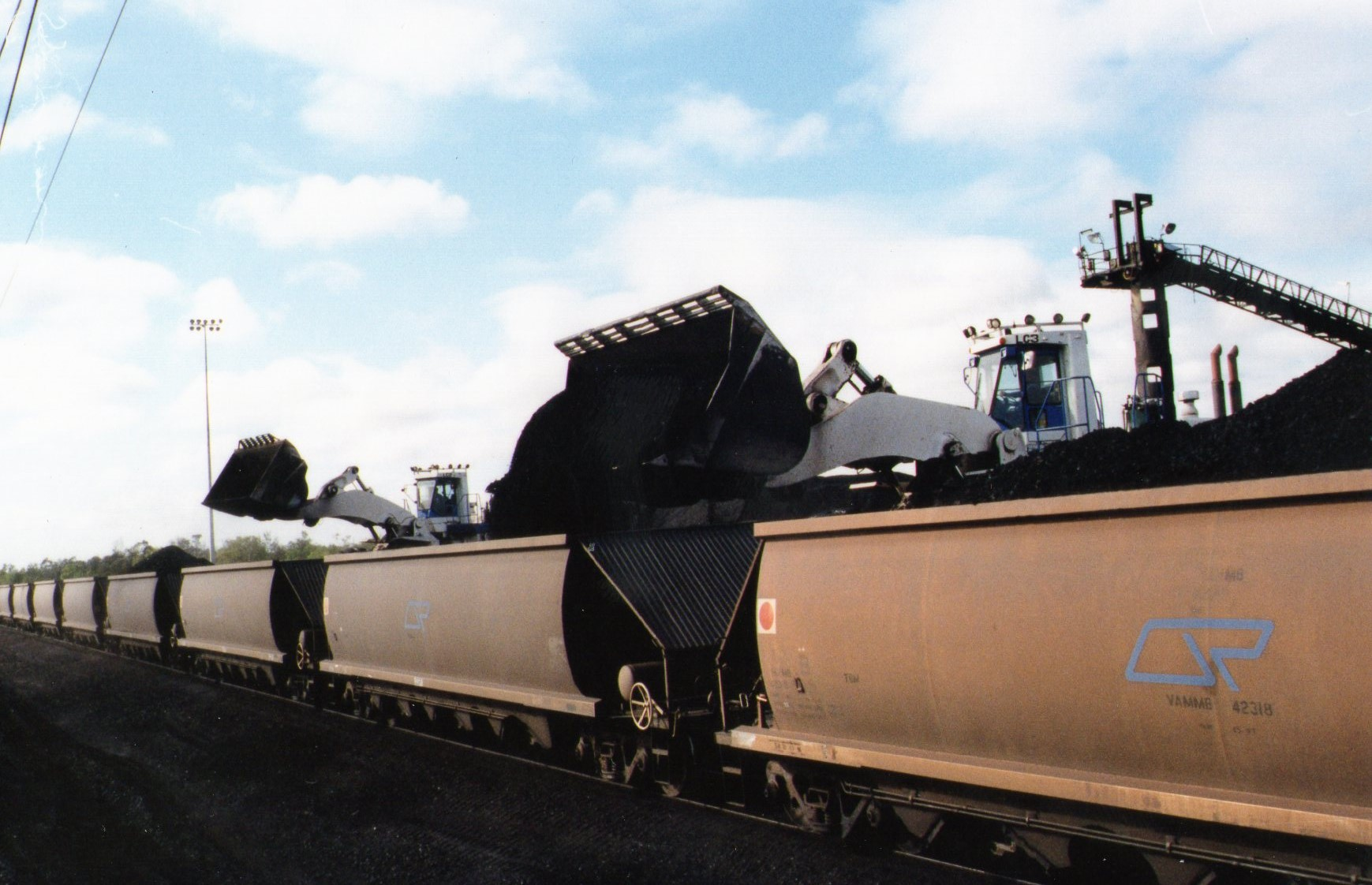
Coal being loaded by front end loaders, Blackwater line

The Blackwater railway system is located in Central Queensland and services the coal mining area of the Bowen Basin. It carries coal, as well as products, to other destinations by way of connections to the North Coast Line at Rocklands and the Goonyella Line via Gregory coal mine to Oaky Creek. Together with the Moura line the two railway systems are known as the Capricornia Coal Chain.

The Blackwater system is narrow gauge 1,067 mm (3 ft 6 in) and electrified using 25 kV 50 Hz. The system is used by both electric and diesel locomotives.

The Blackwater system has the largest route length of the four coal systems and carries the second highest tonnages on the QR network, after the Goonyella system. It is located in Central Queensland, and services the Bowen Basin. Coal is carried to the two export terminals at the Port of Gladstone; RG Tanna Coal Terminal, and Wiggins Island Coal Terminal. The Blackwater system also services a number of domestic users including Gladstone Power Station, Stanwell Power Station, and QCL Fisherman's Landing.

The Blackwater Coal Chain services 15 mines, operated by BMA, Xstrata, Rio Tinto, Curragh, Ensham, Felix, and Jellinbah. Haulage is expected to progressively increase in the Blackwater system as haulage contracts, combined with enquiries from coal companies for additional haulage capacity (domestic and export), exceeds 80 Mpta by 2008–09.

The Blackwater system consists of 994 km of track, of which approximately 160 km is duplicated. 823 km of track is electrified. Callemondah and Bluff yards are used to provision train services. The system is operated from the Rockhampton Control Centre utilising two safe working systems - Remote Control Signalling (RCS) and Direct Traffic Control (DTC).

== See also ==
- Rail transport in Queensland
