= History of rail transport in Australia =

Australians generally assumed in the 1850s that railways would be built by the private sector. Private companies built railways in the then colonies of Victoria, opened in 1854, and New South Wales, where the company was taken over by the government before completion in 1855 due to bankruptcy. South Australia's railways were government owned from the beginning, including a horse-drawn line opened in 1854 and a steam-powered line opened in 1856. In Victoria, the private railways were soon found not to be financially viable, and existing rail networks and their expansion were taken over by the colony. Government ownership also enabled railways to be built to promote development, even if not apparently viable in strictly financial terms. The railway systems spread from the colonial capitals, except for a few lines that hauled commodities to a rural port.

Railways in Australia date from the 10 December 1831 when the Australian Agricultural Company officially opened Australia's first railway, located at the intersection of Brown and Church Streets, Newcastle, New South Wales. Privately owned and operated to service the A Pit coal mine, it was a cast iron fishbelly rail on an inclined plane as a gravitational railway.

The colonial railways were built to three different gauges, which became a problem once lines of different systems met at Albury in 1881 and Wallangarra in 1888. In the 20th century, the lines between major cities were converted to standard gauge and electrified suburban networks were built in Sydney, Melbourne, Brisbane and Perth. In the second half of the 20th century, many rural branch lines were closed to passenger traffic or altogether in all states. On the other hand, long heavy-haul railways were built to transport iron ore in Western Australia and coal in Queensland to ports. In Western Australia these railways are privately owned.

In the 1990s and the early 21st century, the traditional networks were reorganised and partially privatised. The interstate standard gauge network came largely under the control of the Australian Rail Track Corporation and private companies were allowed to operate on it for the first time. Some non-metropolitan intrastate networks became privately controlled and the operation of private freight and passenger trains commenced. The Melbourne suburban railways became the first urban rail system to be operated by private sector franchisees.

== Development of state-based networks ==
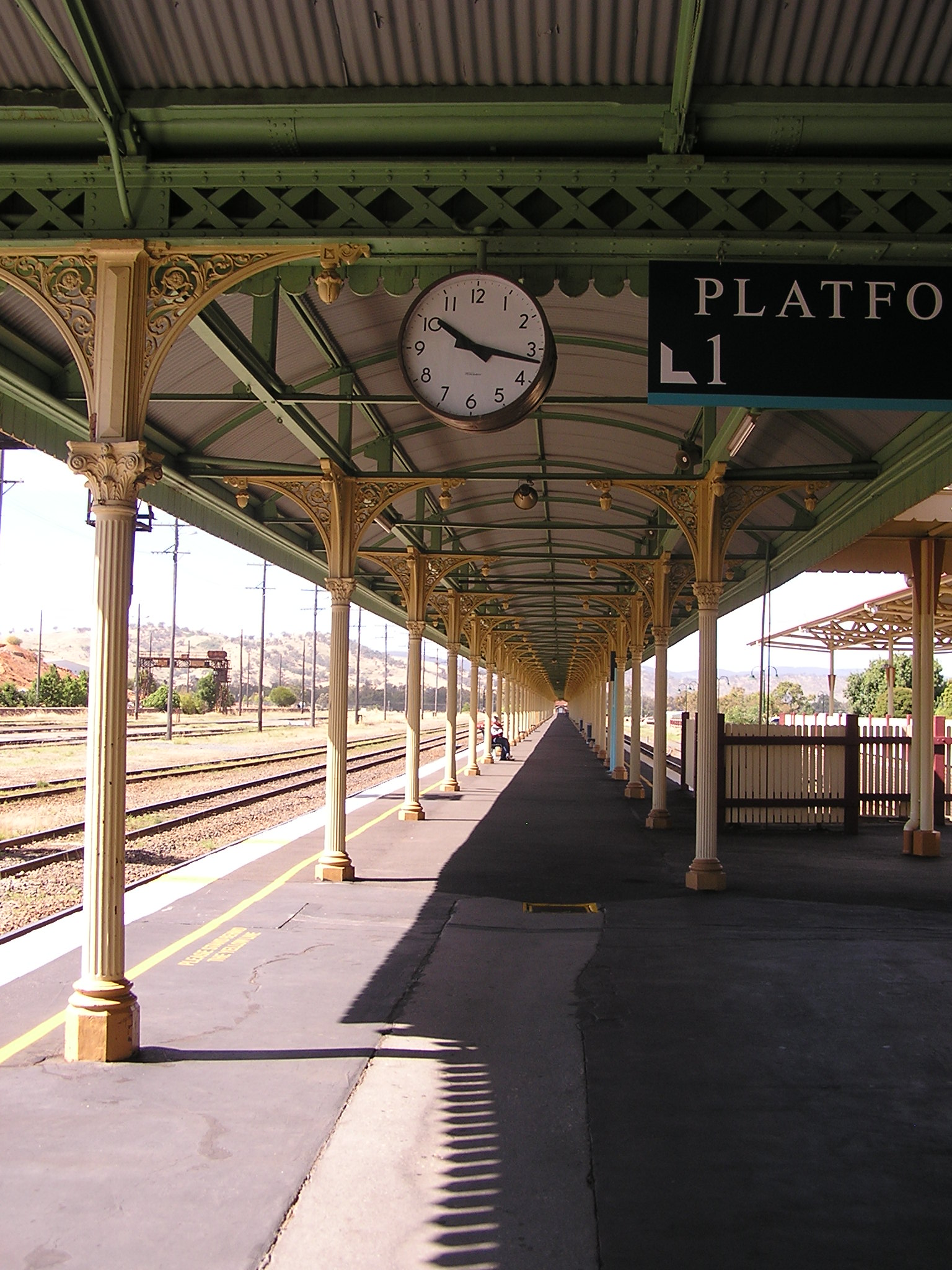
The colonies of New South Wales and Victoria built their railway lines to different gauges. Where they met, at Albury, all travellers had to change trains and all freight had to be laboriously trans-shipped. To shelter passengers roused from their beds in the middle of the night, a covered platform was needed; at 348 metres (381 yards) it is one of the longest in Australia.

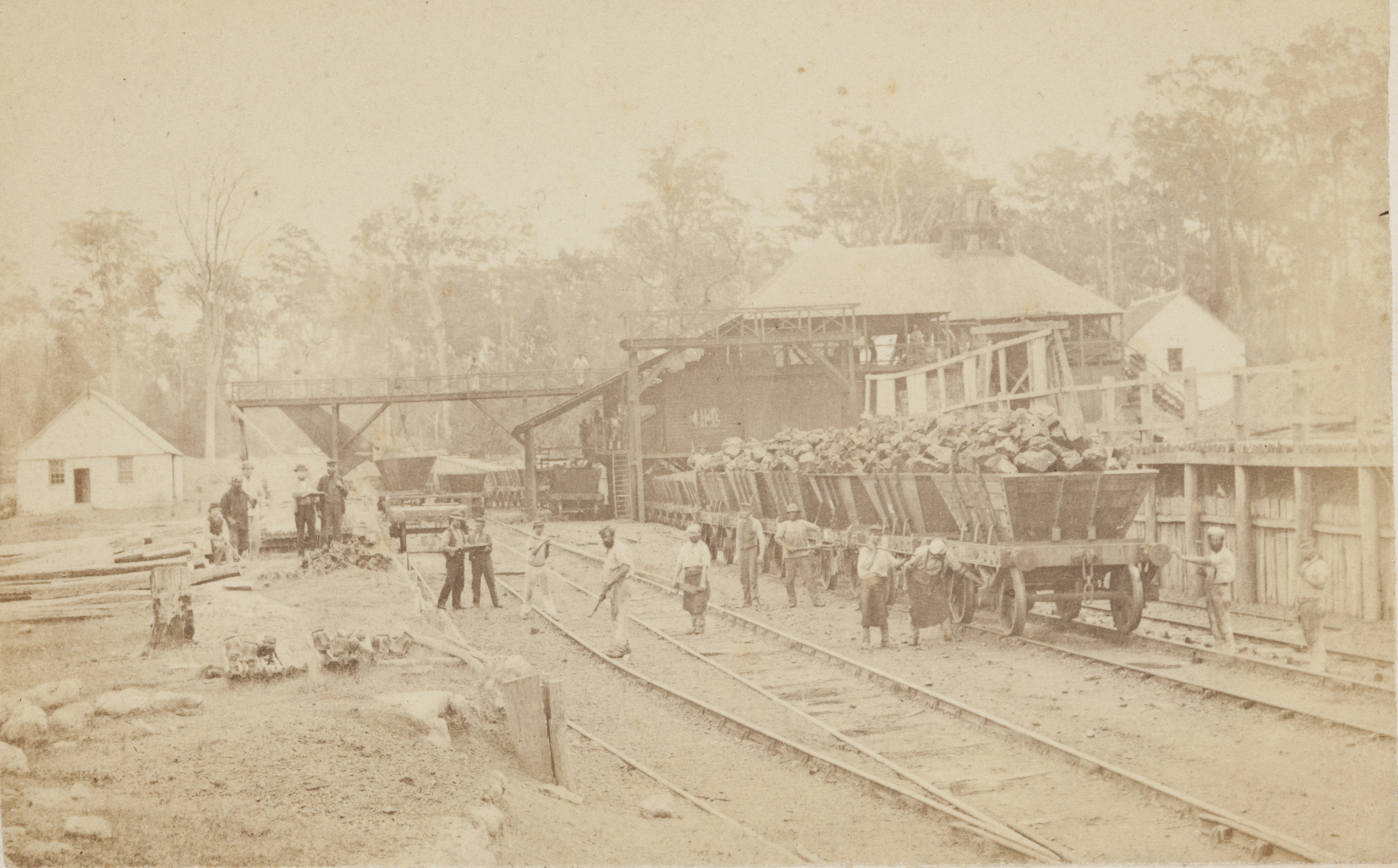
Transporting coal by rail, New South Wales, c. 1872

Railways in Australia date from the 10 December 1831 when the Australian Agricultural Company officially opened Australia's first railway, located at the intersection of Brown and Church Streets, Newcastle, New South Wales. Privately owned and operated to service the A Pit coal mine, it was a cast-iron fishbelly rail on an inclined plane as a gravitational railway.

The earliest railway in South Australia consisted of the 11-kilometre (7 mi) horse-drawn freight line between Goolwa and Port Elliot, which began service on 18 May 1854, allowing steam ships to avoid the treacherous mouth of the Murray River. The first steam locomotive began service soon afterward on the Port Melbourne line between Sandridge (now Port Melbourne), and Flinders Street in Melbourne.

In 1848, the Sydney Railway Company was established to connect Goulburn and Bathurst to Sydney, mainly to convey wool for export to the United Kingdom. The company proposed that standard gauge, that is, 4 ft 8 1/2 in (1,435 mm), be used but had considerable difficulty in raising sufficient funds to commence construction and the first section of the line, between Granville and Sydney was not opened until 1855. This area is now part of Sydney's western suburbs and the railway line became the first section of what is now the Main Suburban line. The Sydney Railway Company went bankrupt building it and as a result the line was taken over by the government, leading to the establishment of the New South Wales Government Railways. Part of the reason for the delay in starting construction and the Company's eventual bankruptcy was the start of the Australian gold rushes in 1851—these created a labour-shortage and forced up prices. In fact the railway did not reach Goulburn until 1869 and Bathurst until 1876, both lines having had to cross difficult topography.

Victoria was the main beneficiary of the gold rushes, with the major discoveries around the state but particularly at Ballarat and Bendigo (then called Sandhurst) in the early 1850s. While this created a labour shortage in the colony (which had separated from New South Wales in 1851), it also caused great development in Melbourne, first settled in 1835 and declared a city in 1847. As a result, Australia's first steam-powered railway was a suburban line opened by the Melbourne & Hobson's Bay Railway Company from Melbourne to Sandridge in 1854. This line and almost all subsequent Victorian lines were built to broad gauge, that is, 1,600 mm (5 ft 3 in). In 1856, the government-owned South Australian Railways opened its first 1,600 mm (5 ft 3 in) gauge line from Adelaide to Port Adelaide.

The three major Australian colonies at the time failed to follow advice from the British Government to adopt a uniform gauge in case the lines of the various states should ever meet. In 1850 the original Irish engineer, Francis Sheilds persuaded the Government of New South Wales to require that all railways in the colony be of the Irish broad gauge. In 1853 a Scots engineer persuaded the legislature to change back to standard gauge. Unfortunately although New South Wales had informed Victoria of the change, the government there decided to continue with 1,600 mm (5 ft 3 in) gauge and South Australia then followed Victoria. Suggestions and proposals respectively that Victoria should follow New South Wales or New South Wales should convert to the Victorian gauge were made soon after but the states followed their initial choice.

Queensland's first line, which used 3 ft 6 in (1,067 mm) gauge known in Australia as narrow gauge, from Ipswich to Bigge's Camp, the first stage of a railway between Brisbane and Toowoomba, opened in 1865. This gauge was intended to save money and was subsequently followed by Tasmania and Western Australia. As a result, in the middle of the 20th century Australia had almost equal amounts of each gauge. Tasmania's first 1,600 mm (5 ft 3 in) gauge line opened in 1871 from Deloraine to Launceston and was converted to 1,067 mm (3 ft 6 in) gauge in 1888. Finally, Western Australia opened its first Government-owned line in 1879 between Geraldton and Northampton. Lines spread in all the states from these first lines, connecting ports to farmland and ports.

The mainline systems of New South Wales, Victoria, South Australia and Queensland met (albeit with three breaks of gauge) in the 1880s. Only Victoria and South Australia shared a common gauge, and even so they opted to change engines at the border. The other mainland colony, Western Australia, was isolated by 2,000 kilometres (1,200 mi) of desert. The first break of gauge was created when the New South Wales and Victorian lines met at Albury in 1883. The railways of Victoria and South Australia meet at Serviceton in 1887, but these lines were both broad gauge. In 1888 the railways of New South Wales and Queensland meet at Wallangarra. Meanwhile, in 1889, the first line (1,067 mm (3 ft 6 in) gauge) in the Northern Territory was opened from Darwin to Pine Creek. In 1914, an 8-kilometre (5 mi) extension of the New South Wales Railways from Queanbeyan to Canberra was opened to create the Australian Capital Territory's first and only line.

=== New South Wales ===
New South Wales' railways date from the 10 December 1831 when the Australian Agricultural Company officially opened Australia's first railway, located at the intersection of Brown and Church Streets, Newcastle. Privately owned and operated to service the A Pit coal mine, it was a cast iron fishbelly rail on an inclined plane as a gravitational railway

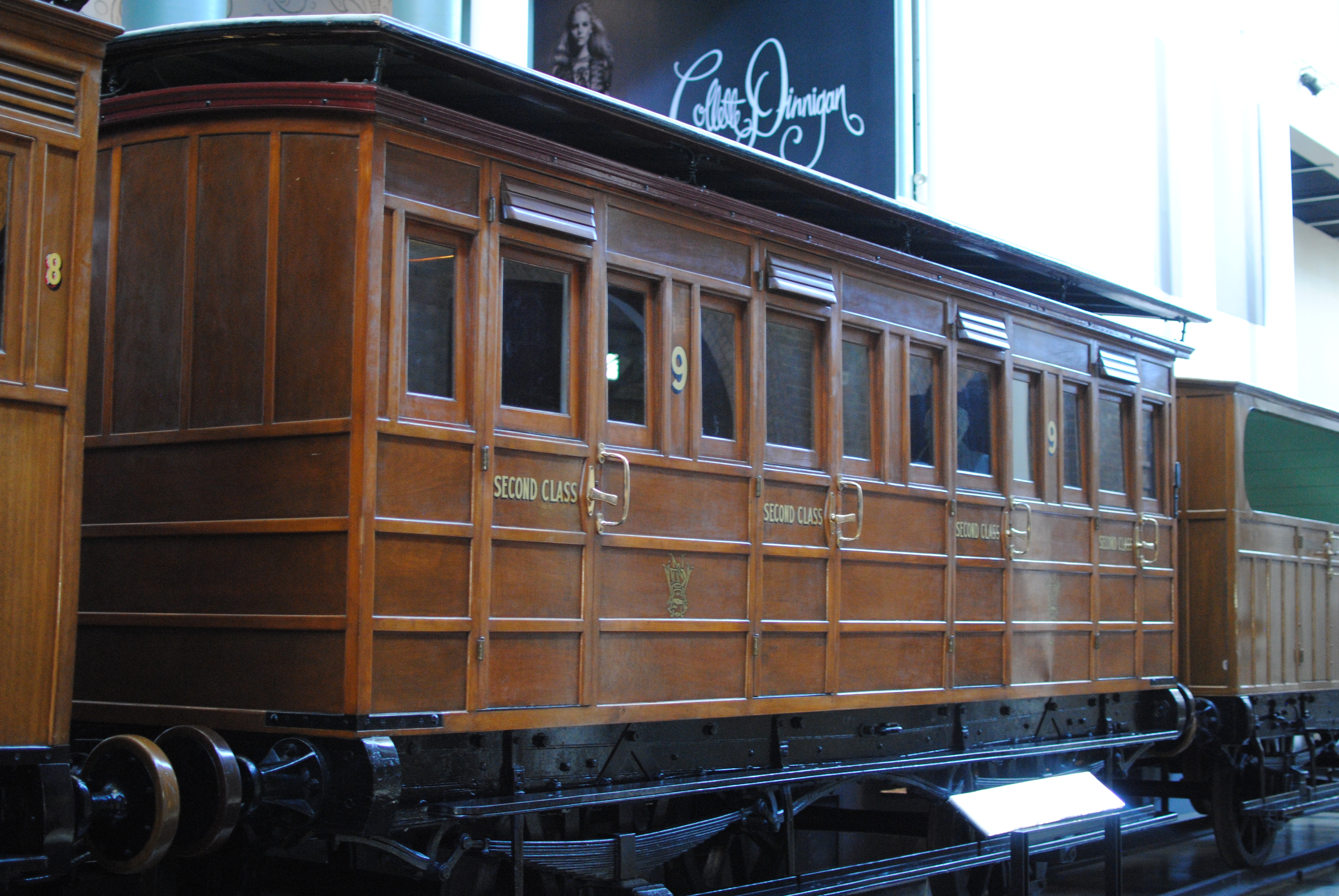
Preserved second class coach of 1854, built by Joseph Wright & Sons for the Sydney to Parramatta line at the Powerhouse Museum

New South Wales' railways were standard gauge lines built to connect the ports of Sydney and Newcastle to the rural interior. The first public railway was the Main Suburban line from Sydney to Parramatta Junction and after two decisions to change the rail gauge, problems in raising capital and difficulties in construction, the line was opened in 1855. The Main Southern line was built in stages from Parramatta Junction to the Victorian border at Albury between 1855 and 1881 and connected to the Victorian Railways at a break-of-gauge in 1883. The standard gauge connection from Albury to Melbourne was finally completed in 1962. Meanwhile, the Main Western line was built in stages to the north west of the state, starting in 1860 at Parramatta Junction and reaching Bourke in 1885.

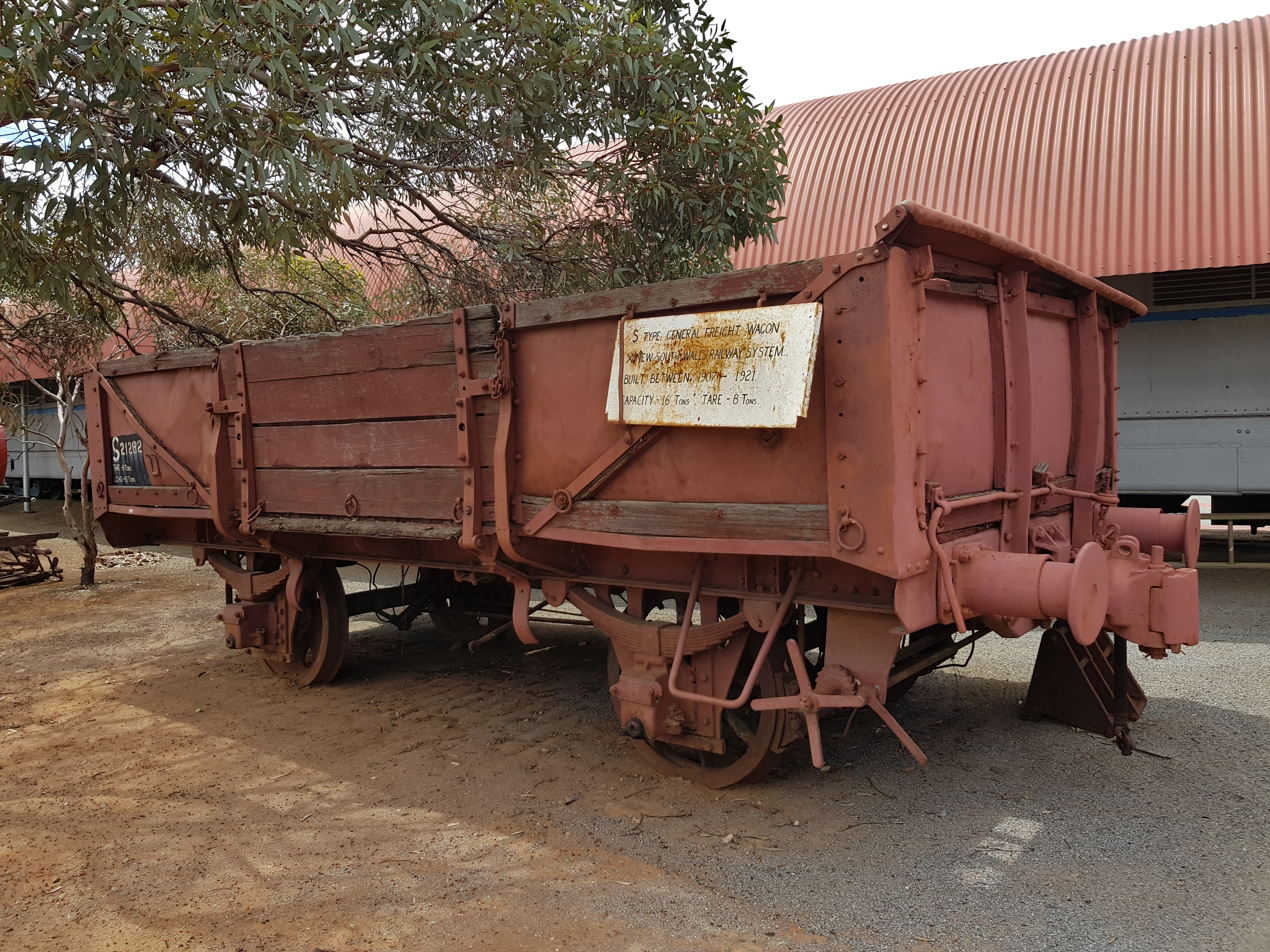
NSWGR freight car type S, built 1907–21

The Main North line was built in sections over several years. The Sydney to Newcastle section was connected with the conclusion of the final two stages, Mullet Creek to Gosford (opened 16 January 1888) and Hawkesbury to Mullet Creek (opened 1 May 1889), of the Homebush to Waratah line, these final two stages required the construction of the Woy Woy Tunnel and the original Hawkesbury River Railway Bridge. The Newcastle to Wallangarra section was constructed between 1857 and 1888 with a break-of-gauge required at the New South Wales and Queensland border. The North Coast line, constructed between 1905 and 1932 with the completion of the Grafton Bridge, brought about the closure of the northern end of the Main North line at the Maitland junction due to its shorter distance.

The last main line, the Broken Hill line was completed to Broken Hill in 1927, connecting with the South Australian Railways at a break of gauge. Meanwhile, branch lines proliferated over the settled east of the state, including the Illawarra line to Wollongong and Bomaderry completed in 1893. In 1926 work began on electrifying Sydney's urban railways and connecting them together via new lines.

=== Victoria ===
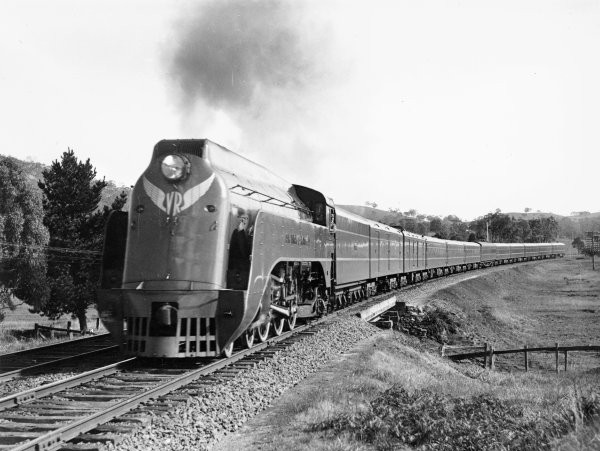
Premier express train of the Victorian Railways, the Spirit of Progress in 1937

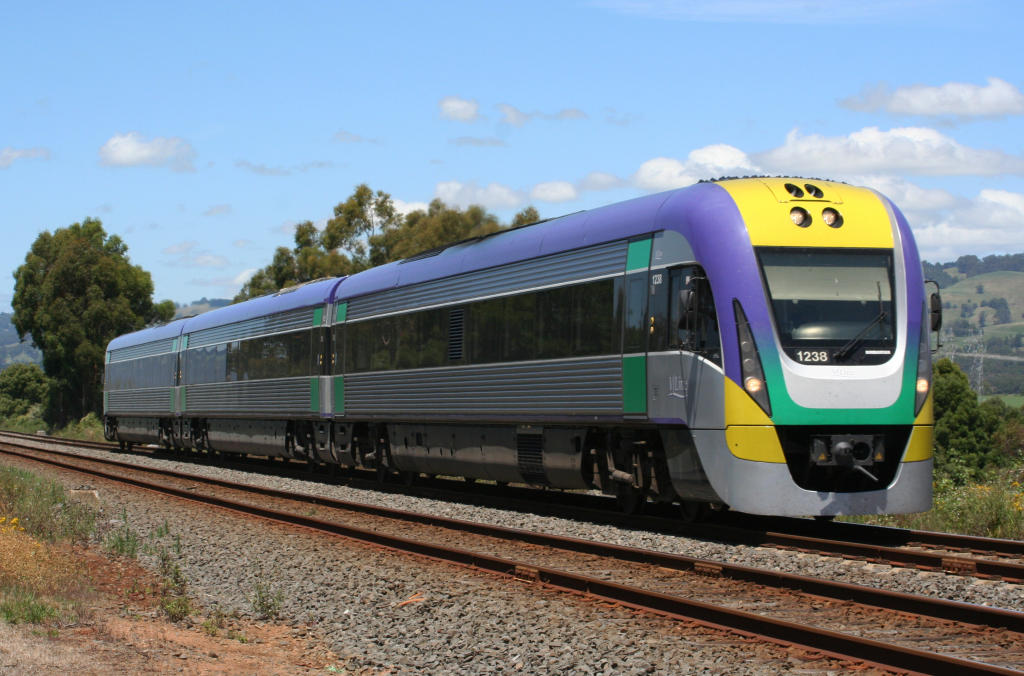
A V/Line VLocity train, part of the Regional Fast Rail project

Victoria's first railway was a suburban railway opened from Melbourne to Port Melbourne in 1854. The Melbourne & Suburban Railway Company's line from Princes Bridge to Punt Road (Richmond) opened in 1859. In the same year the Geelong and Melbourne Railway Company opened its line from Melbourne to Geelong. Subsequently the Victorian Railways built new railways to connect farming and mining communities to the ports of Melbourne, Geelong and Portland. In 1862 lines reached the great gold rush towns of Bendigo and Ballarat. In 1864 a line was opened to the Murray River port of Echuca. In 1883 the first connection with another State's rail system was made when the North East line was completed to the New South Wales Government Railways station at Albury, requiring a break-of-gauge to New South Wales' 4 ft 8 1/2 in (1,435 mm) standard gauge Main Southern line. In 1887, Victorian Railways met South Australian Railways at Serviceton, although both systems used broad gauge.

In 1919, electrification and development of the Melbourne suburban lines commenced. Minor extensions to suburban lines have continued, but patronage fell as road transport gained favour from the 1960s. In recent years, patronage has risen substantially, with more than 200 million trips on the network in 2007–2008. In 1981, Melbourne's only underground railway, the City Loop was opened. On the country network, a large number of uneconomic branch line railways have been closed since the 1950s, leaving a skeleton network by the time of the Lonie Report of 1980. Privatisation of the Victorian railway network was carried out by the Kennett Government in the 1990s, with freight, suburban and country rail services split into separate companies. This was later followed by the Regional Fast Rail project that saw track upgrades, new trains, and an improved timetable to major regional cities.

=== Queensland ===
The first line opened in 1865 from Ipswich to Grandchester, a temporary terminus in the foothills of the Darling Downs. It was built to narrow gauge 3 ft 6 in (1,067 mm) in order to reduce costs through the steep escarpment. This was subsequently applied to all the railways built in Queensland, except for the Sydney–Brisbane line and the Weipa mining railway, both built in the 20th century. This was the first 1,067 mm (3 ft 6 in) railway in the world, but the gauge subsequently spread to Western Australia, South Australia, Tasmania, New Zealand, Japan, Indonesia and several African countries. The line was extended from Grandchester to Toowoomba at the top of a steep climb in 1867 and was connected from Ipswich to Brisbane in 1875. From Toowoomba it was extended in stages to meet the New South Wales standard gauge line at Wallangarra in 1887 and to Charleville in outback southern Queensland in 1888.

Independent lines were commenced from the east coast ports of Maryborough, Bundaberg, Gladstone, Rockhampton, Mackay, Bowen, Townsville, Cairns and Cooktown. The central line opened from Rockhampton to Westwood in 1887 and reached Winton in central western Queensland in 1928. The northern line opened from Townsville to Charters Towers in 1882 and reached Mount Isa in 1929. In 1888 the east-west lines began to be connected with the opening of the first section of the North Coast line to Petrie. It was not until 1924 that this line finally reached Cairns, Cooktown was never connected.

Many heavy haul coal lines were built in the late 20th century from the ports of Gladstone (beginning in 1968) and Hay Point (beginning in 1971). Electrification of some of the heavy haul coal lines commenced in 1986. Finally an electrified rail system was developed in suburban Brisbane from 1979. Eventually the North Coast line between Brisbane and Rockhampton was electrified. This, together with the central Queensland mining railway, constitutes Australia's only significant rural rail electrification.

=== Western Australia ===
The locomotive "Ballarat" in the sand at Wonnerup, 1921. Reputed to be the oldest in Western Australia, the engine now sits in St Marys Park, Busselton.

The first railway in Western Australia was the Ballaarat tramline, a private timber railway from Lockville to Yoganup near Busselton, south of Perth. In 1879, the Western Australian Government Railways opened a 1,067 mm (3 ft 6 in) gauge line to connect the copper mine at Northampton and the port of Geraldton. Subsequently lines also developed from the ports of Fremantle (the port of Perth), Bunbury, Albany and Esperance, mainly for carrying grain and minerals. The line between Fremantle, Perth and Guildford (about 15 kilometres or 9.3 miles further east of Perth) was opened in 1881. In 1893, Perth was connected to the port of Bunbury, 175 kilometres (109 mi) south of Perth. In the following year the Midland Railway Company opened a line from Perth to Walkaway, which connected with the Government line to Geraldton, 424 kilometres (263 mi) north of Perth. In 1896, the railway connected Perth to Kalgoorlie, where gold had been discovered in 1893.

In the 20th century, Perth was finally connected to the eastern states. In 1917, the standard gauge Trans-Australian Railway connected eastern Australia with the narrow gauge network at Kalgoorlie. The nationalisation of non-paying branch lines started in 1957, with the closure of many lines. Commencing in the 1960s, a number of long distance heavy-haul railways have been built in the Pilbara region by major iron mining companies, particularly BHP and Hamersley Iron. New lines are still being built in this area, particularly to supply the booming Chinese market. In 1986, the electrification of Perth suburban lines with a 25 kV 50 Hz AC overhead power supply commenced. The longest new line was opened on 23 December 2007 from Perth to Mandurah.

=== South Australia ===
In 1854, South Australia opened a horse-drawn tramway from the port of Goolwa on the Murray River to an ocean harbour at Port Elliot to transfer freight between shallow-draft vessels and coastal and ocean-going vessels, which later became part of the steam-powered network. The South Australia line was later extended to a safer harbour at Victor Harbor.

The first South Australian steam-operated line was built as a broad gauge 1,600 mm (5 ft 3 in) line in 1856 between the city and Port Adelaide stopping at Bowden, Woodville and Alberton, followed by a broad gauge line to Gawler the next year 1857. This line was extended to Kapunda, a copper mining town in 1860 and then to Burra the great copper centre in 1870. Gradually, a network of lines spread out from Adelaide, Port Wakefield, Wallaroo, Port Broughton, Port Augusta, Kingston SE, Beachport, Whyalla, Port Pirie and Port Lincoln. Some of these were built initially to carry ore, particularly copper. Some lines later carried freight from the Murray River and grain from the broadacre lands. All but the lines radiating from Adelaide were initially narrow 1,067 mm (3 ft 6 in) gauge lines. The first narrow gauge line was completed in 1870 from Port Wakefield to Hoyleton but was soon upgraded to broad gauge and extended to Blyth, the station nearest the township of Clare.

The first interstate connection was completed in 1887, when the South Australian and Victorian broad gauge railways met at Serviceton. In 1888 a narrow gauge line was opened from Port Pirie to Broken Hill, with a connection at Peterborough to Adelaide. The broad gauge line was completed from Adelaide to Terowie in 1880. The line north of Terowie was built as a narrow gauge line in stages to Peterborough and Quorn in 1882 and Oodnadatta in 1891. This was extended to Alice Springs by the Commonwealth Railways in 1929, when it was renamed the Central Australia Railway.

=== Tasmania ===
The first railway in Tasmania was a broad gauge 1,600 mm (5 ft 3 in) line opened between Deloraine and Launceston in 1871 by the Launceston and Western Railway. It quickly went bankrupt and was effectively taken over by the Tasmanian Government in 1872. In 1876 the Tasmanian Main Line Company opened a narrow gauge 1,067 mm (3 ft 6 in) line from Hobart to Evandale (near Launceston), connecting with an extension of the Launceston and Western line at a break-of-gauge. Further gauge confusion was added in 1885 when the Tasmanian Government built a narrow gauge line west of Deloraine to Devonport. This was resolved in 1888 by the conversion of the Launceston–Deloraine line to narrow gauge.

The Tasmanian Government bought the Tasmanian Main Line Company in 1890, creating the Tasmanian Government Railways. In 1901 the line to Devonport line was extended to Burnie, connecting with the Emu Bay Railway's Melba line to Zeehan. Other branches were built but the Tasmanian system has always been small and unprofitable. Operated by the Tasmanian Government owned TasRail since 2009, previous owners include Australian National, Australian Transport Network and Pacific National.

== Development of the national network ==
In the 19th century, railways were created to enable agricultural and minerals traffic to be carried to ports for export, and to allow passenger and freight operations between colonial capitals and regional areas. Coastal shipping handled most passenger and freight traffic between the colonies. John Whitton was appointed Engineer in Chief of the New South Wales Government Railways in 1856 and immediately advised his government that the short railway that had been opened in Sydney be converted to broad gauge in case the railways of New South Wales, Victoria and South Australia ever joined, but he was refused because "... his political masters ... were unable to envisage intercolonial traffic ever developing." However, the problem of different gauges became apparent with the meeting of lines of the different systems at Albury in 1883 and Wallangarra in 1888.

In the 1890s, the establishment of an Australian Federation from the six colonies was debated. One of the points of discussion was the extent that railways would be a federal responsibility. A vote to make it so was lost narrowly, instead the new constitution allows "the acquisition, with the consent of a State, of any railways of the State on terms arranged between the Commonwealth and the State" (Section 51 xxxiii) and "railway construction and extension in any State with the consent of that State" (Section 51 xxxiv). However, the Australian Government is free to provide funding to the states for rail upgrading projects under Section 96 ("the Parliament may grant financial assistance to any State on such terms and conditions as the Parliament thinks fit").

The Australian Government has full responsibility for railways in the federal territories, although the Northern Territory's railway is now owned and operated by the private AustralAsia Rail Corporation and the only railway in the Australian Capital Territory, the Canberra-Queanbeyan railway is now operated by NSW TrainLink.

In 1910, a conference of Railway commissioners chose 4 ft 8 1/2 in (1,435 mm) to be the standard gauge. Over the decades, many plans were floated to fix the break of gauge. These failed, mainly because they were too ambitious and proposed to convert all lines, even lines of little economic value.

=== Creating a standard gauge network ===
In the 20th century, the different state rail systems became more integrated, initially creating more breaks of gauge. In 1917, the federal government's standard gauge Trans-Australian Railway was completed between Kalgoorlie and Port Augusta. However, this required a break of gauge at Kalgoorlie to reach Perth and breaks of gauge at both Port Augusta and Terowie to reach Adelaide. In 1927, the last section of the Sydney–Broken Hill line was completed between Trida and Menindee meeting the South Australian Railways line at a break of gauge and requiring a further break of gauge at Terowie to reach Adelaide.

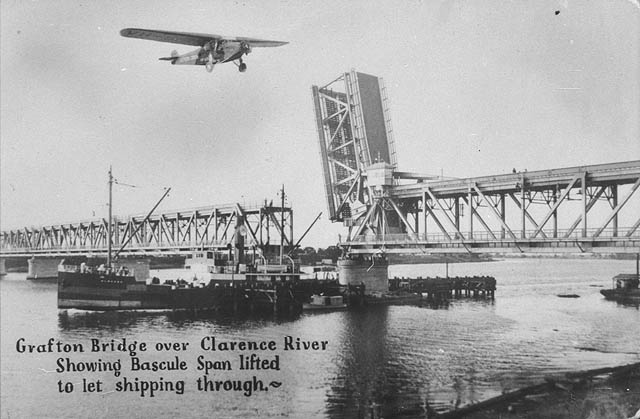
The Grafton Bridge over the Clarence River with Bascule span lifted to let shipping through

In 1932 the first progress in reducing the gauge conflict was made with the completion of the standard gauge Sydney–Brisbane railway with the opening of a bridge at Grafton. The first standard gauge line in South Australia, Trans-Australian Railway, was completed in 1917 between Port Augusta and Kalgoorlie, requiring break-of-gauges at Terowie, Port Augusta and Kalgoorlie to reach Perth. This line was extended to Port Pirie Junction in 1937 and the broad gauge line from Adelaide to Redhill was extended to Port Pirie, removing one break-of gauge.

In the 1950s, a parliamentary committee chaired by William Wentworth recommended a much more modest and affordable plan to gauge convert the three main missing links:

- Albury to Melbourne standard gauge track added parallel to broad gauge to complete the Sydney–Melbourne railway.
- Kalgoorlie to Perth – narrow gauge converted to standard gauge.
- Broken Hill to Port Pirie – narrow gauge converted to standard.

In 1962 the Albury to Melbourne standard gauge line was opened, completing the Sydney–Melbourne railway. In 1966, a new mixed standard and narrow gauge Eastern Railway route was completed through the Avon Valley, east of Perth. In 1968 the Kalgoorlie to Perth line was completed and in 1969 the Broken Hill to Port Pirie standard gauge railway were opened, completing Sydney–Perth railway.

The Whyalla line was opened between Port Augusta and Whyalla in 1972. In October 1980, a new standard gauge railway was completed from Tarcoola to Alice Springs, replacing the former narrow gauge railway. Adelaide was connected to the standard gauge network with the opening of the line to Crystal Brook in 1982 and the Melbourne–Adelaide railway was converted to standard gauge in 1995. Meanwhile, the Tarcoola to Alice Springs railway was extended to Darwin in 2004 to complete the Adelaide–Darwin rail corridor.

== Private railways ==
There have always been niches for private railways in most colonies, such as:

- timber – private timber lines have occurred in most forested areas of Australia since the late 19th century
- mining – private iron mining railways alone now account for most Australian rail freight by tonnage, but private coal railways have been important since the early years of coal mining in the mid 19th century
- quarrying
- major factory sites, such as steel works
- temporary lines at construction sites
- agriculture, especially the sugar industry

=== Timber railways ===
Most timber railway operations across Australia were transitory, only existing for the time that timber was extracted. Some lines were moved regularly to the areas of forest to be exploited. A few 19th century operations were horse hauled, but most were steam powered. Very few timber railways lasted into the 1960s with the advent of more versatile and stronger road based haulage.

=== Mining railways ===
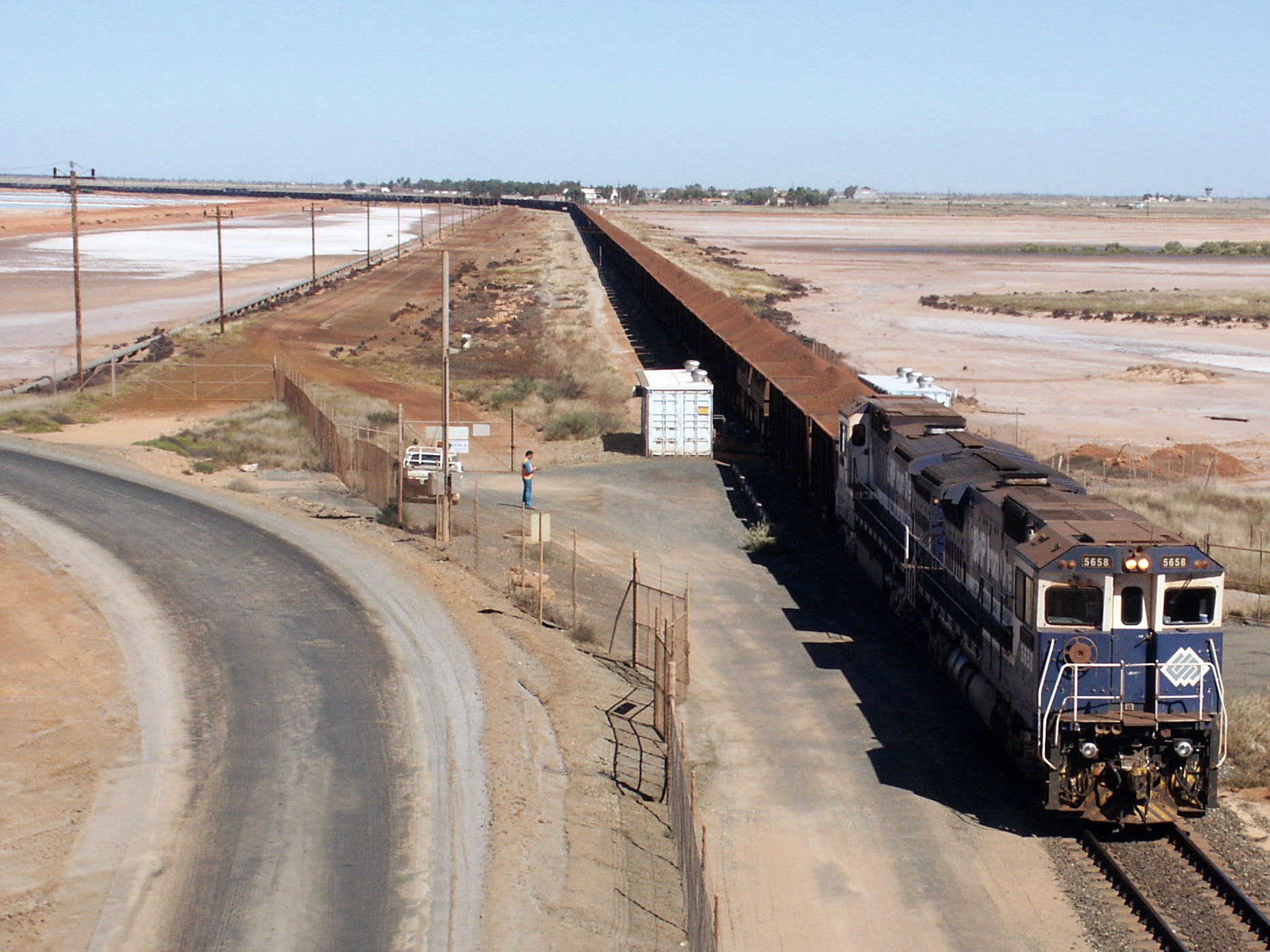
A train transporting iron ore on the Mount Newman railway line in 2003

Starting in the 1960s, four heavy duty railways were developed in the Pilbara region of the far north of Western Australia for the haulage of iron ore from several mines to the nearest ports. These railways are isolated from each other and from the national system, carrying no other traffic.

The very heavy traffic on these lines, up to 100 million tonnes (220 billion pounds) per year, push wheel/rail technology to its limits, and has resulted in considerable research and development that has been of value to railways worldwide.

These iron ore railways are all 1,435 mm (4 ft 8 1/2 in) gauge, and started off using American standards for track, locomotives and wagons.

In 2008, Fortescue commenced operating a fifth iron ore railway in the Pilbara.

The railway lines are:

- Hamersley & Robe River railway line (Rio Tinto)
- Mount Newman railway line (BHP)
- Goldsworthy railway line (BHP)
- Fortescue railway line (Fortescue)

== 1990s and recent developments ==
=== Privatisation ===
In 1992, the largely federal government owned National Rail Corporation took over interstate rail freight operations from Australian National, FreightCorp and the Public Transport Corporation, and commenced operations on the interstate network. National Rail Corporation's freight operations and rolling stock (not infrastructure) were combined with the New South Wales Government owned FreightCorp and sold to Toll Holdings and Patrick Corporation as Pacific National in 2002.

Australian National was privatised in 1997. Its Tasmanian operations and infrastructure (TasRail) were sold to Australian Transport Network, which was taken over by Pacific National in 2004. South Australian branch lines were sold to Genesee & Wyoming Australia. Its passenger operations were taken over by Great Southern Railway.

State freight and country passenger operations were privatised. Urban passenger trains remained in government ownership, except in Victoria, because such services are politically sensitive and could not operate profitably.

New operating companies that appeared included:

- Aurizon
- Australian Railroad Group
- Australian Southern Railroad, eventually named One Rail Australia
- Bowmans Rail
- FreightLink
- Magnetic Rail Group
- Patrick Rail Operations
- Qube Logistics
- Rail First Asset Management
- SCT Logistics
- Silverton Rail
- South Spur Rail Services
- Southern Shorthaul Railroad
- Watco Australia

Licensing of personnel with nationally recognised credentials facilitates the transfer of those people from one state or operator to another, as traffic demands.

=== Separation of infrastructure and operations ===
Construction and maintenance of network infrastructure were consolidated into non-profit government bodies, in the case of the interstate network and the non-urban railways of New South Wales (Australian Rail Track Corporation) and Western Australia (WestNet Rail). This was intended to provide access to new and existing players.

The interstate rail network of the former Australian National Railways was transferred to the newly established Australian Rail Track Corporation in 1998. In 2002, the Tarcoola–Alice Springs line was leased to the AustralAsia Rail Corporation. The ARTC track consists of the track from Kalgoorlie to Broken Hill and Serviceton. The ARTC also manages under lease the interstate standard gauge rail network in New South Wales and Victoria and has rights to sell access between Kalgoorlie and Kwinana to interstate rail operators under a wholesale access agreement with the Western Australian track owner and operator, Brookfield Rail. It also "has a working relationship with Queensland Rail about the use of the 127 kilometres of standard gauge line between the Queensland border and Fisherman Islands. ARTC intends to start discussions with Queensland about leasing this track once the NSW arrangements are bedded down". The ARTC also maintains the NSW rural branch lines under contract.

Other railways continue to be integrated, although access to their infrastructure is generally required under National Competition Policy principles agreed by the Federal, State and Territory governments:

- Queensland – Queensland Rail
- Tasmania – Pacific National
- Victorian non-interstate lines – Pacific National
- Western Australian non-interstate lines – Australian Railroad Group
- South Australian non-interstate lines – Genesee & Wyoming Australia
- Tarcoola-Darwin railway – FreightLink

Much maintenance of tracks were contracted out.

=== Australian Government funding ===
The Australian Government has provided substantial funding for the upgrading of roads since the 1920s, but it has not regularly funded investment in railways except for its own railway, the Commonwealth Railways, which was established in 1911 to build the standard gauge Trans-Australian Railway between Kalgoorlie and Port Augusta, and to take over the 1,067 mm (3 ft 6 in) gauge railways between Port Augusta and Oodnadatta (used by the old "Ghan") and the Palmerston and Pine Creek Railway. Commonwealth Railways became part of Australian National Railways in 1975, which was privatised in 1997. Although the Australian Government has considered the funding of railways owned by State Government to be a State responsibility, it has made loans to the States for gauge standardisation projects from the 1920s to the 1970s. From the 1970s to 1996, the Australian Government has provided some grant funding to the States for rail projects.

==== One Nation program ====
Under the Keating government's One Nation program:

- the Melbourne-Adelaide line was converted to standard gauge in 1995.
- the 1,067 mm (3 ft 6 in) gauge Fisherman Islands line to the Port of Brisbane was converted to dual 1,435 mm (4 ft 8 1/2 in) / 1,067 mm gauge and extended in parallel with the duplicated passenger line to Dutton Park.
- a standard gauge link was built to the port at Fremantle.
- new standard gauge sidings were provided at Adelaide Outer Harbor.
- a separate freight line was built between Ingleburn and Glenfield as the first stage of what is now known as the Southern Sydney Freight Line. It was extended in 2013 to connect with the Metropolitan Goods line near Sefton with funds provided by the Australian Government under AusLink.
- the Sydney–Brisbane line was upgraded with longer passing loops, the replacement of wooden trestles with concrete bridges, concrete resleepering, some minor deviations and bank stabilisation.
- passing loops were extended between Wodonga and Melbourne.

==== Alice Springs to Darwin railway ====
In 2004, the final link in the Adelaide-Darwin rail corridor – the long-awaited 1420 km Alice Springs to Darwin line – was opened by the AustralAsia Rail Corporation with assistance from the Australian Government and the governments of South Australia and the Northern Territory. The Northern Territory expected that the line would open up mining ventures that would otherwise be uneconomic without a heavy duty rail line.

==== Inland Rail ====
Inland Rail is a railway construction project extending from Melbourne to Brisbane along a route west of the Great Dividing Range. Construction in stages commenced in 2018 and is scheduled to be completed in 2025, using existing routes where appropriate.

=== Single regulator ===
In 2009, it was proposed to combine the seven separate state rail regulators into a single regulator.

== See also ==
- Australian Railways Union, for labour issues
- Australian Railway Historical Society for detailed histories andcurrent projects
- History of rail transport
- Rail transport in Australia
