= Asia Pacific Transport Consortium =

Australian railway consortium

- Company type: Consortium of three companies and a joint venture
- Founded: 1999; 27 years ago
- Defunct: 2010; 16 years ago
- Key people: Rick Allert (Chairman)
- Owner: FreightLink

The Asia Pacific Transport Consortium is a consortium of three companies and a joint venture established to operate a railway in Australia.

== History ==
=== Construction ===
The consortium was established in 1999 to:

- construct and maintain 1420 kilometres (882 miles) of rail line between Alice Springs and Darwin in the Northern Territory of Australia
- lease and maintain the pre-existing 830 km (515 mi) line between Tarcoola and Alice Springs
- integrate the railway line with Darwin’s East-Arm Port
- operate the Adelaide to Darwin freight service for 50 years from January 2004.

Under a concession deed by the AustralAsia Railway Corporation, it was also contracted for performance of the project.

The consortium performed all rail safety, marketing, operation and asset management functions associated with the business. It outsourced to rail service providers train control, train crewing, terminal loading, port operations, and maintenance associated with track and rolling stock. It derived the majority of its revenue from freight forwarders for transportation of general freight, and from transport agreements with mining companies. Revenues from the consortium's four largest customers accounted for approximately 53% and 55% of total revenues in 2009 and 2010 respectively.

The design and construction was subcontracted to ADRail, a consortium of Kellogg Brown & Root, John Holland, Barclay Mowlem and Macmahon.

=== Operations ===
The operations were subcontracted to an operating company, FreightLink, a consortium Kellogg Brown & Root, John Holland, Barclay Mowlem, Macmahon and Australian Railroad Group. FreightLink in turn subcontracted specialist activities, such as logistics and terminal operations, rail maintenance, rail operations and port operations, to various subcontractors.

The first freight train arrived at Darwin's East Arm Port from Adelaide on 17 January 2004, operated by FreightLink. The first passenger train, The Ghan, arrived on 3 February.

In December 2006 the consortium entered into a No Action Agreement with its senior banks until March 2009 to allow it time to continue its business ramp-up activities so that it would be in a position to either sell or restructure its business, or refinance its senior debt facilities. Early in 2008, the board of directors decided that a voluntary sale process would allow the consortium to comply with its obligations under that agreement. A preferred bidder was appointed in September 2008 but the bidder's offer lapsed. The board then appointed a voluntary administrator. In November 2008, the senior banks appointed receivers and managers, the No Action Agreement was terminated and the senior bank borrowings were called by the security trustee on their behalf, and a sale process was started. At that time, financial markets declined due to the 2008 financial crisis and the interested parties declined to make offers.

A deed of company arrangement was approved by creditors of the consortium in April 2009 and executed on behalf of the senior banks in May 2009, to which the consortium was to be subject for up to four years unless the business was sold by the receivers. In June 2010, the receivers signed a business sale agreement with Genesee & Wyoming for the sale of the consortium's assets, contracts and agreements. However, delays in various governmental and regulatory approvals resulted in the assets subject to the agreement being held on a continuing-use basis, and the receivers continued to operate the consortium on a business-as-usual basis until the sale date of 1 December 2010. After completing the sale as a going concern, the receivers handed the companies included within the consortium back to the administrator and the joint venture back to the shareholders. The companies were liquidated, thus ending the consortium.

Meanwhile, although the railway had led to a boom in bulk mineral transport, the operating company, FreightLink, was unable to repay its debt and in December 2010 was purchased by Genesee & Wyoming Australia, which until then had operated the railway's rolling stock. That company, now One Rail Australia, operates trains, controls traffic, and maintains above-rail and below-rail assets on the Tarcoola–Darwin line. It also inherited the obligations of the concession deed with the regulator — the AustralAsia Railway Corporation, which oversees fulfilment of deed obligations. One Rail Australia will continue to do so until 2054, when ownership will pass to the Australian Government and the build–own–operate–and–transfer agreement will end.
