= Charles Da Costa =

Australian railway architect

Charles Da Costa (1889–1974) was an Australian architect known for his work as a railway architect in Queensland. He specialised in reinforced concrete and structural steel designs.

== Early life ==
Charles Brandon Da Costa was born in Townsville in 1889, the youngest child of Edwin Da Costa, the Townsville postmaster and his wife Sarah Warner. He apprenticed to T.S. Martin, an engineer and architect in Sydney between 1905 and 1907. Da Costa was awarded a first class diploma from the Sydney School of Mechanical Drawing in 1907 and was subsequently employed by the Queensland government in its Railways division. He was an Engineering Junior Draftsman between 1907 and 1910. He was promoted to Draftsman in 1911 and Designing Architectural Draftsman in 1919 but was retrenched in 1921.

== Architectural practice ==
He went into private practice where he was an architect and structural designer and worked with G. McLeish from 1927 to 1930. He became a registered architect in Queensland in 1929 (ARAIA). Da Costa was an advocate of the modernist movement in the 1920s and designed a number of Spanish-American style homes in Brisbane. He and a number of other architects lobbied the Brisbane City Council in 1931 to include an Advisory Aesthetic Board as part of their town planning department to help with the design of parks, foreshores and other spaces. He was employed by Burns Philp and Co in 1930 and then again took employment with the Queensland Railways in 1935. He was Principal Railway Architect between 1938 and 1955 when he retired. He lived in the Sandgate area. He died in 1974 and was survived by his four children. Drawings from Da Costa's private practice are held in the Fryer Library at the University of Queensland.

== Personal life ==
Da Costa married Florence Warner in Brisbane in 1910. They had four children.

== Notable works ==
Sandgate Bath House, 1925

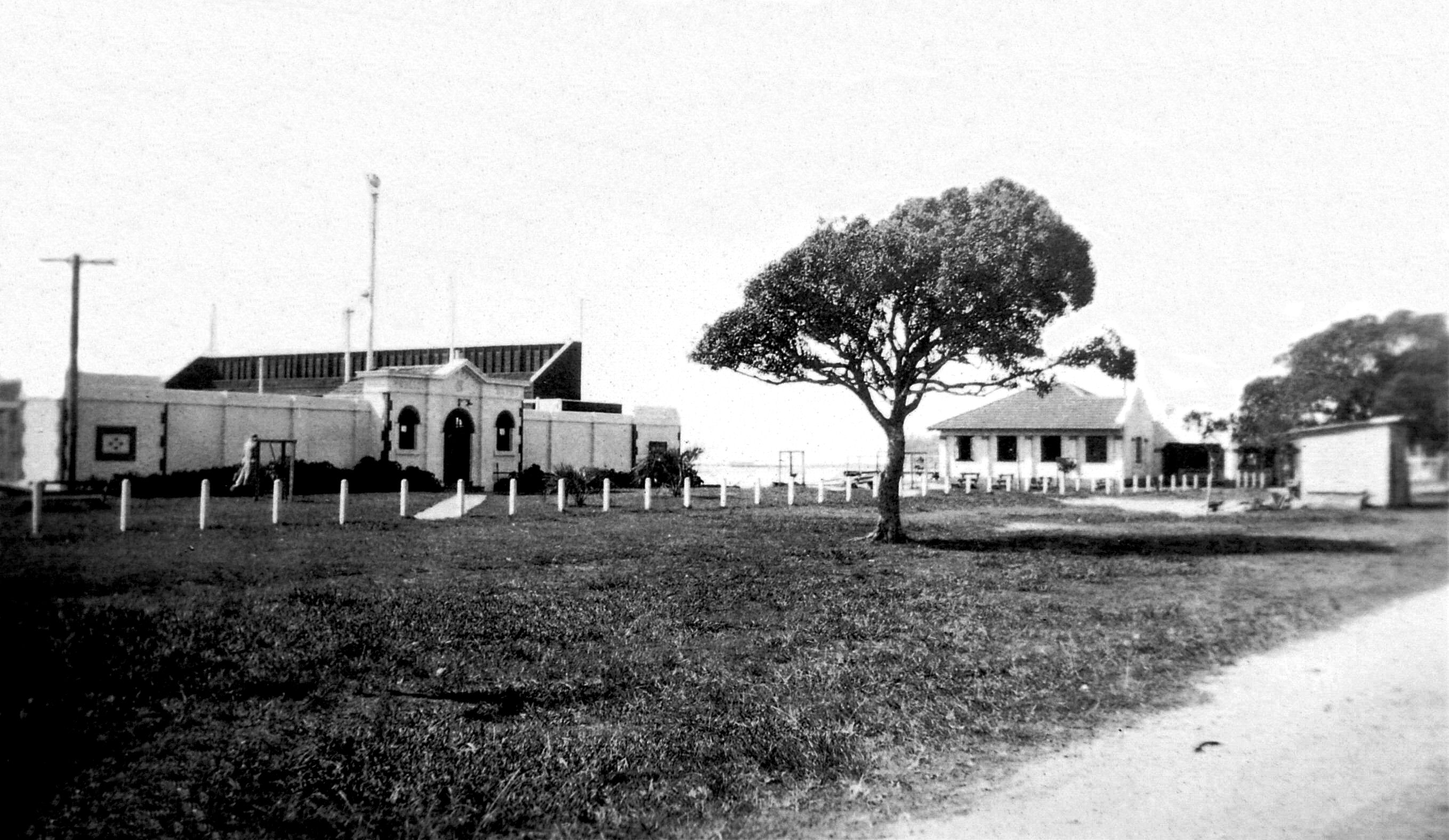
The Baths at Sandgate, near Brisbane, circa 1935

Liberty Cinema, The Grange, 1930

Public Air Raid Shelter, Landsborough Railway Station

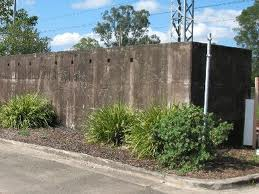
Air raid shelter, Landsborough Railway Station

Tool and Gauge Shop, Ipswich Railway Workshops

Charleville Railway Station, 1957
