= WAGR J class (diesel) =

Class of diesel locomotives

Western Australian Government Railways J class
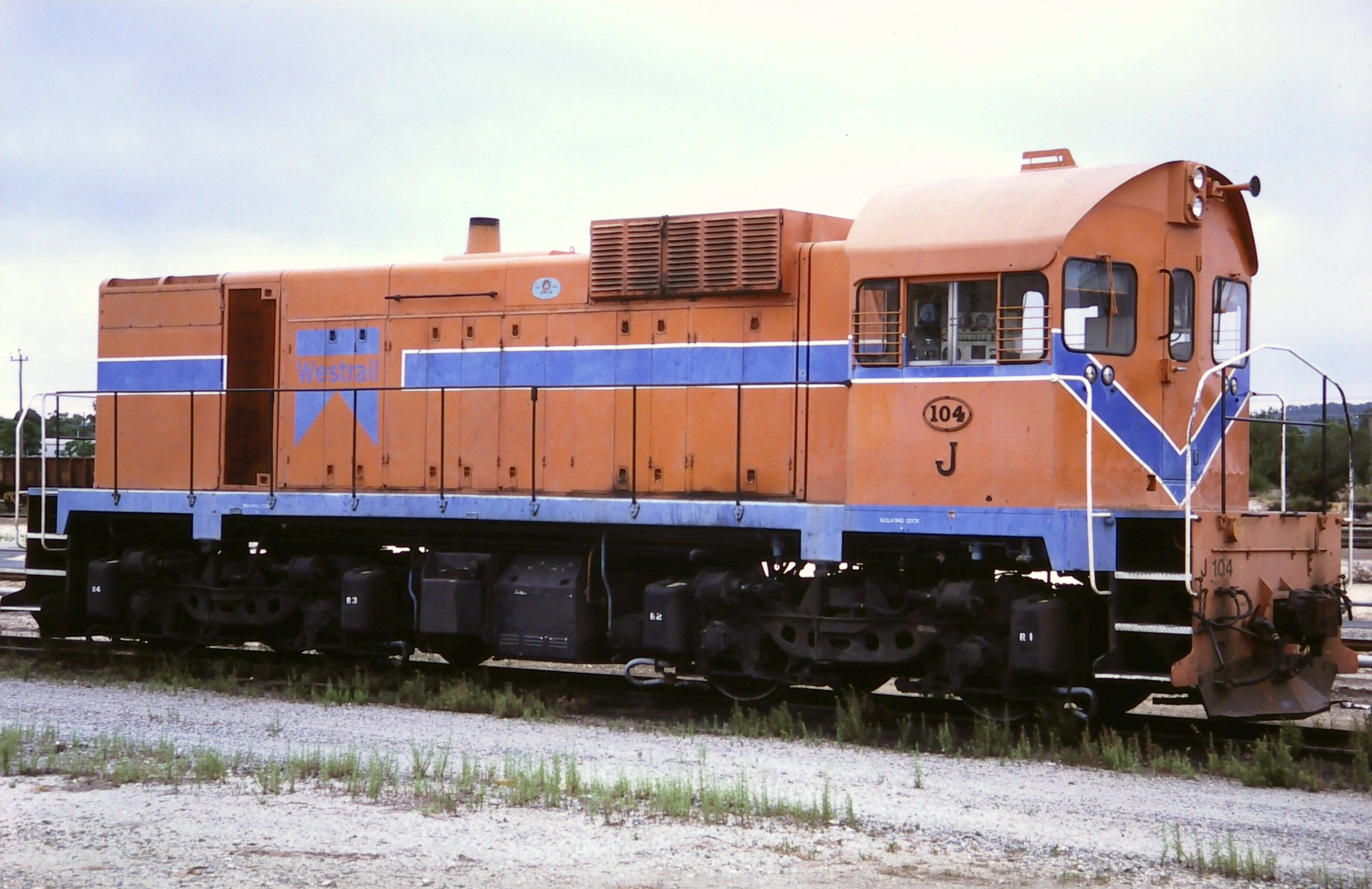
- Portrait of Westrail J class locomotive J104
Type and origin
- Power type: Diesel-electric
- Builder: Clyde Engineering, Granville
- Serial number: 66-479 to 66-483
- Model: EMD G6B
- Build date: 1966
- Total produced: 5
Specifications
- Configuration
  - AAR: B-B
  - UIC: Bo′Bo′
- Gauge: 1,435 mm (4 ft 8 1/2 in) standard gauge
- Length: 13 m (42 ft 8 in)
- Fuel type: Diesel
- Fuel capacity: 2,730 L (600 imp gal; 720 US gal)
- Prime mover: EMD 6-567C
- Aspiration: Roots Blower type
- Alternator: EMD D25C
- Generator: EMD D25/D29
- Cylinders: 6
- Transmission: Diesel-electric
- Loco brake: Westinghouse Air brake
- Train brakes: Air brakes
Performance figures
- Maximum speed: 115 km/h (71 mph)
- Power output: 448 kW (601 hp)
Career
- Operators: Western Australian Government Railways
- Number in class: 5
- Numbers: J101–J105
- First run: July 1966
- Current owner: Aurizon; SCT Logistics
- Disposition: 2 in service, 2 stored, 1 scrapped

The J class are a class of diesel locomotives built by Clyde Engineering, Granville, for the Western Australian Government Railways in 1966.

== History ==
The J class entered service between July and October 1966 to provide as shunters for the 657-kilometre (408 mi) Eastern Goldfields Railway from Perth to Kalgoorlie that was being converted to standard gauge. They were a development of the Victorian Railways Y class.

J101 was scrapped in July 1986 with the remaining four sold in 1995 to Great Northern Rail Services and moved to South Dynon Locomotive Depot. They operated freight transfer and infrastructure trains under contract to National Rail. Following the cessation of Great Northern Rail Services in 2004, the 4 units were split up. J102 & J103 were sold to CFCLA and stayed in Melbourne. These 2 units were hired to Southern Shorthaul Railroad for use as terminal shunters and infrastructure workings. J102 & J103 were purchased by SCT Logistics for use as shunters at their various terminals. J104 & J105 were sold to Freightlink, renumbered to FJ104 & FJ105, and moved to the Northern Territory as terminal shunters in Alice Springs and Tennant Creek. They were transferred to Genesee & Wyoming Australia following its acquisition of Freightlink. They would pass onto One Rail Australia and later Aurizon, after that company's acquisition of ORA. 102 and 103 currently bear their former SSR colour scheme, whereas 104 and 105, which are currently stored at Dry Creek, are still painted in Freightlink livery.

Status table
| Number | Entered Service | Status | Owner | Livery | Operator | Notes |
|---|---|---|---|---|---|---|
| J101 | 1966 | Scrapped | Westrail | Westrail Orange | N/A | Scrapped in 1986 |
| J102 | 1966 | In service | SCT Logistics | SSR yellow | SCT Logistics | Shunting unit only |
| J103 | 1966 | In service | SCT Logistics | SSR yellow | SCT Logistics | Shunting unit only |
| J104 | 1966 | Stored | Aurizon | Freightlink | Aurizon | Re-classed to FJ104 |
| J105 | 1966 | Stored | Aurizon | Freightlink | Aurizon | Re-classed to FJ105 |
