= Macmahon Holdings =

Company based in Perth, Western Australia

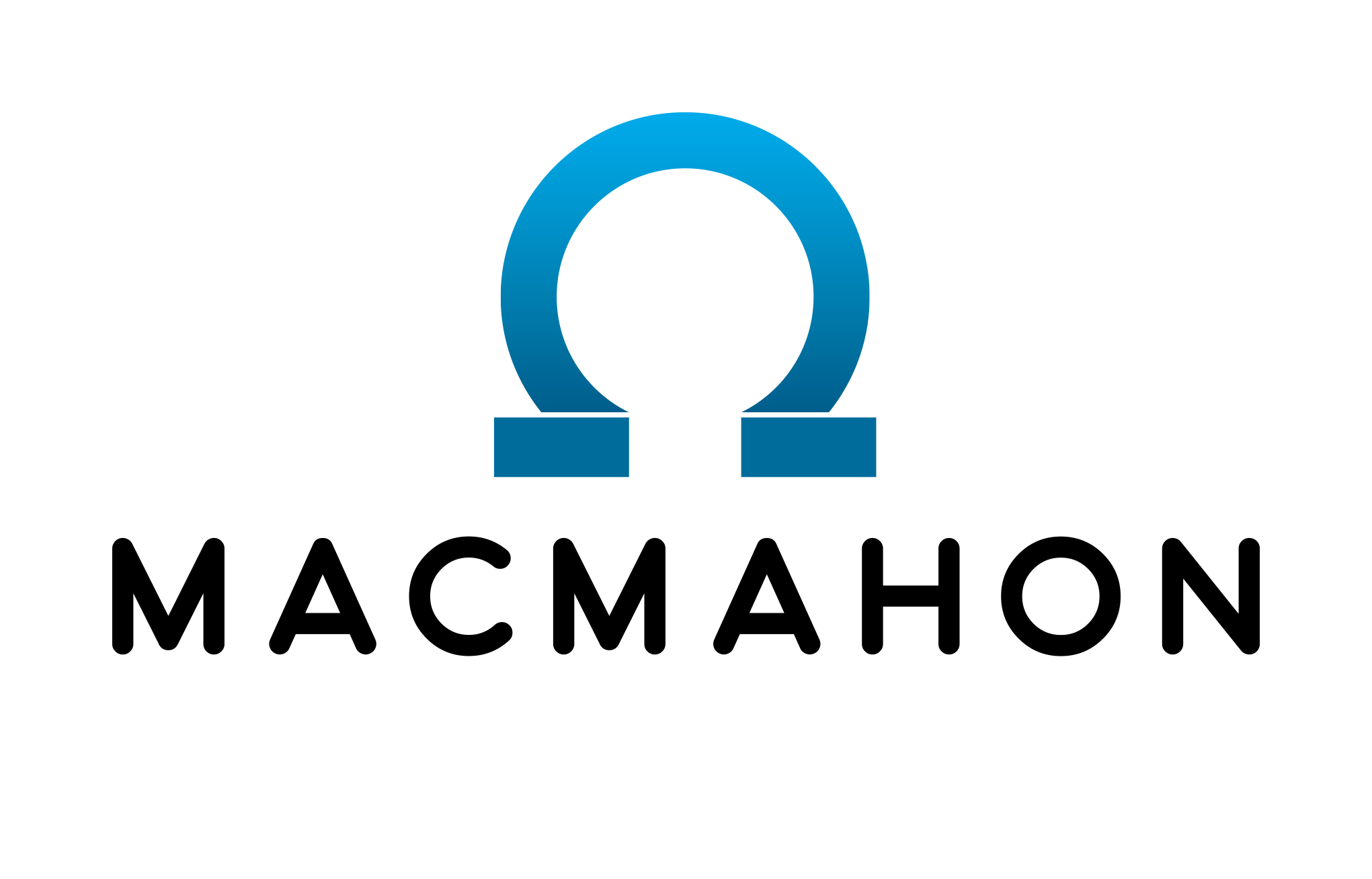
- Type: Public
- Traded as: ASX: MAH
- Industry: Construction; Mining
- Founded: 1963
- Founder: Brian MacMahon
- Headquarters: Perth, Western Australia
- Key people: Michael Finnegan (CEO)
- Revenue: $2 billion (2024)
- Net income: $352 million (2024)
- Number of employees: 9,676 (2024)
- Subsidiaries: Decmil
- Website: www.macmahon.com.au

Macmahon Holdings Limited is an Australian mining services and construction company. Founded in 1963, it is listed on the Australian Securities Exchange.

== History ==
Macmahon Holdings was founded in 1963 by Brian Macmahon. Its first mining contract was for excavation works at the Nobles Nob Gold Mine at Tennant Creek in the Northern Territory. In 1983 it was listed on the Australian Securities Exchange. In 1987 it acquired FK Kanny & Sons, an open cut mining contractor in Western Australia. In 1994 it commenced operations in Chile and Malaysia. In 1994 it purchased Kalgoorlie based underground mining specialist National Mine Management.

In 2005, it purchased the Northern Territory operations of Henry Walker Eltin. In 2006, a 60% shareholding in rail contractor MVM Rail was purchased, with COMSA owning the other 40%.

In January 2013, Macmahon secured its largest ever contract from Fortescue after it was awarded a $1.8 billion contract for the Christmas Creek mine's expansion. The five-year contract would deliver all aspects of mine operations, including drill and blast, overburden removal, ore harvesting, maintenance of equipment and associated services, for the expansion.

In December 2012, the construction business was sold to Leighton Holdings. In August 2024, it re-entered the construction sector, acquiring Decmil.

== Notable projects ==
- Dampier to Bunbury Natural Gas Pipeline
- Darwin railway line as part of the Asia Pacific Transport Consortium
- section of the Great Northern Highway near Broome
- Karara railway line
- Mandurah railway line in joint venture with John Holland and Multiplex
- section of the Mitchell Freeway, Perth
- North-South Motorway, Adelaide in joint venture with John Holland
- section of the Roe Highway, Perth in joint venture with Transfield
- section of the South Eastern Freeway, Adelaide in joint venture with Walter Construction Group
- section of the Tonkin Highway, Perth in joint venture with John Holland

== Decmil ==
Decmil was founded in 1978 in Karratha, Western Australia as Silla Careba, being renamed Decmil in 1983, being a portmanteau of its owners, Dennis Criddle and Milan Babic. It was listed on the Australian Securities Exchange in 2005. In August 2024, it was acquired by Macmahon Holdings and delisted.
