= Rick Allert =

Australian businessman

- Born: 11 February 1943; Victor Harbor
- Awards: Centenary Medal (2001); Member of the Order of Australia (For service to business and to the community, particularly through the National Heart Foundation., Mr Richard Hugh ALLERT, 1997); Officer of the Order of Australia (For service to the business sector through visionary leadership and promotion of corporate social responsibilty, and to the community through involvement with and support for a range of artistic, charitable and educational organisations., Mr Richard Hugh ALLERT, 2008)

Richard Hugh "Rick" Allert AO is an Australian businessman who was chair of Tourism Australia from 2007 to 2012.

Before this, he worked with Carroll Winter & Co Chartered Accountants from 1959 to 1960, and then with Peat Marwick Mitchell & Company from 1960; he was a partner with them from 1973 to 1979. He was a senior partner of Allert Heard & Co Chartered Accountants (1979–89) until it was acquired by the then Arthur Andersen & Co in 1989.

He was chair of Southcorp (1989–2002). In 1995, he was appointed a director of Coles Myer. He was chair of Coles Myer from 2002 until it was acquired by Wesfarmers in 2007. Allert is also chair of AXA Asia Pacific Holdings Ltd, Voyages Hotels & Resorts Pty Ltd and a Director of the Australia Business Arts Foundation.

He was appointed a Member of the Order of Australia (AM) in 1997, an Honorary Doctor of the University of South Australia in 2000, awarded the Centenary Medal in 2001, and was appointed an Officer of the Order of Australia (AO) in 2008.

== Director list ==
- Northern Territory Development Corporation
- Northern Territory Trade Development Zone
- South Australian Oil & Gas Corporation

== Chairman list ==
- Chairman of the National Mutual Life Association Ltd. (NMLA)
- Chairman of the Aboriginal Foundation of South Australia Inc.
- Chairman of the Western Desert Resources Ltd.

• Chairman of the James Morrison Academy of Music

== Charity positions ==
- Duke of Edinburgh’s Award Scheme (SA)
- National President of the National Heart Foundation of Australia
- Chairman Pembroke School Foundation
- Deputy Chairman of the Adelaide Football Club Ltd.

== Awards ==
In 2011, Rick Allert was the recipient of The Ernst & Young Champion of Entrepreneurship Award, Central Region. This award is given to those individuals "with a long-term record of outstanding entrepreneurial achievement, who have driven the growth of an Australian company, or companies over a sustained period of time and made a significant contribution to their community."

== Other positions ==
- Commissioner of the South Australian Health Commission
- Deputy Chairman of the South Australian Development Council
- Chairman of AustralAsia Railway Corporation
- Chairman of the National Wine Centre
- Member of the Singapore Australia Business Alliance Forum
