= Landsborough Air Raid Shelter =

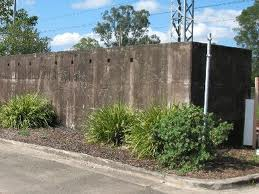
- Landsborough Air Raid Shelter, 2012

- Location within Queensland Location within Australia
- Interactive map of Landsborough Air Raid Shelter
- 26.8088°S 152.9663°E
- Location: Cribb Street, Landsborough, Sunshine Coast Region, Queensland, Australia

History
- Built: 1942

Queensland Heritage Register
- Official name: Public Air Raid Shelter, Landsborough Railway Station
- Type: state heritage (built)
- Designated: 3 April 2009
- Reference no.: 602709
- Significant period: 1942 (fabric); 1940s (historical use)

Landsborough Air Raid Shelter is a heritage-listed air raid shelter at Cribb Street, Landsborough, Sunshine Coast Region, Queensland, Australia. It was built in 1942. It was added to the Queensland Heritage Register on 3 April 2009.

== History ==
The reinforced concrete air raid shelter at the Landsborough railway station, built in 1942 by Queensland Rail, was designed to provide shelter, in the event of a Japanese air raid, for train passengers waiting at the railway station during World War II.

The Landsborough district was first settled in the 1870s and the North Coast railway line reached Landsborough from Caboolture in February 1890. A railway station building was erected and by 1893 Landsborough was a refreshment stop for passengers, as it was approximately halfway between Brisbane and Gympie. Between 1890 and the 1930s Landsborough was an important transport centre for holiday makers at Caloundra to the east, and for farmers in the Blackall Range to the west.

During World War II the Landsborough station saw increased activity due to the military camps located in the area. An Australian Imperial Force bulk store was erected in Landsborough in May 1941, but after December 1941 military units were also stationed on the North Coast (now known as the Sunshine Coast) as part of the defence of Moreton Bay and Brisbane against the Japanese, and for training prior to deployment in the South West Pacific Theatre. For example, the Royal Australian Navy maintained a Signal Station on Caloundra Head, the Americans maintained a Radar Training School at Caloundra from early 1942 until 1943, and Australian artillery units trained at Battery Hill. Fortress troops were stationed on Bribie Island, Volunteer Defence Force units trained in the hinterland, and the 7th Division Australian Imperial Force also trained in the district in 1942, before being replaced by the 3rd Division (Militia).

There were about 2000 American troops, and up to 10,000 Australian troops, in Landsborough Shire at any one time, before training camps were relocated to the Atherton Tableland in 1943. Many troops in the area would have arrived and departed from Landsborough railway station, and numerous troop trains also passed through Landsborough on their way to North Queensland, with some stopping for refreshments. After the Battle of the Coral Sea in May 1942 many Australian and American troops and supplies were railed north on the single railway line to Cairns. In mid 1942 a troop train full of American soldiers broke down at the Landsborough station.

The North Coast railway line was extremely busy during the war, and trains heading north and south on the single line had to be co-ordinated. The Caboolture to Gympie section had reached saturation point even before the war, and there was no scope for building crossing loops for trains to pass each other. However, 30 crossing loops were built between Maryborough and Cairns between 1940 and 1945. Ammunition trains had priority, followed by troop trains, and then civilian trains. Due to the resulting delays, the Allied Works Council erected special eating houses and kitchens, and temporary showers and toilets, alongside appropriate stations to cater for bored troops.

The construction of an air raid shelter at Landsborough railway station was probably linked to this increased wartime traffic, as well as to government regulations regarding the safety of the population. Regulation 35a, an amendment to the National Security (General) Regulations of the National Security Act 1939–1940, was notified in the Commonwealth Government Gazette on 11 December 1941 (as Statutory Rules 1941 No. 287), and authorised each State Premier to direct "blackouts" and to "make such provision as he deems necessary to protect the persons and property of the civil population".

In the Protection of Persons and Property Order No. 1, gazetted 23 December 1941, Queensland Premier William Forgan Smith, with powers conferred by Regulation 35a, ordered the Brisbane City Council to construct 200 public surface shelters in the city area (235 were built). Another 24 local governments in Queensland's coastal areas were ordered to produce surface or trench shelters for the public, to be constructed according to the Air Raid Shelter Code laid down in the Second Schedule of Order No. 1 (135 public shelters were built). Where local authorities were unwilling or unable to build the required number of code-compliant shelters, in some cases because they had already begun erecting other shelters, the Department of Public Works became responsible for the shelters' construction.

A large number of businesses also built air raid shelters. The Protection of Persons and Property Order No. 1 required the owners of any building in the coastal areas where over 30 people would normally be present at any one time to build shelters either within the building, or adjacent to it. At mines where over 30 people would normally be present on the surface, trench shelters were required near the pithead; and any powerhouse, gas works or pumping station related to the public supply of electricity, gas, or water was also required to build shelters.

Early in January 1942 the engineer Percy Harold Ainscow reported to the Lands Administration Board, Department of Lands, regarding the building of air raid shelters. He noted that concrete public shelters had been built close to railway stations at Cairns, Townsville, Rockhampton, Gladstone, and Bundaberg, and recommended that shelters should be built near any important stations where large numbers of people waited for trains, for example at Innisfail and Mackay. In Australia the process of building public air-raid shelters at railway stations during World War II seems to have been unique to Queensland, probably because in early 1942 the state's railway network was the most vulnerable to Japanese air attack.

However, there was disagreement over who was responsible for building shelters at railway stations. In early February 1942 Queensland Railways claimed that local authorities should build public shelters near railway stations, rather than Queensland Railways having to build them on railway premises. At a conference in late February, the Secretary for Health and Home Affairs, E.M. Hanlon, stressed that if Queensland Railways did not act on building public air raid shelters it would make it harder for the State to insist that other businesses and local authorities do so. It was recommended that the department of Public Works proceed to construct shelters on or adjoining railway premises, with the numbers to be decided on by Public Works in consultation with the Commissioner for Railways.

On 2 March 1942 a memorandum from the Undersecretary of the Department of Public Works reported that Queensland Railways had already built shelters for its employees at some of the larger train stations, and it recommended that a further 28 full size public surface shelters, three half size shelters, and three sets of trenches, be built outside Brisbane. Most of the recommended surface shelters and trenches were on the North Coast railway line, at 19 stations from Nambour to Cairns. Shelters were also recommended for Mount Morgan, Kingaroy (trenches), Southport (two), Ipswich, and Toowoomba (two). Landsborough was not mentioned in this list. It was also noted that shelters had already been built (presumably those for railway employees) at Cairns, Townsville, Rockhampton, and Toowoomba (two).

By 23 March 1942 work on the public air raid shelters was in hand, after the Department of Public Works and Queensland Railways agreed to proceed in accordance with plans acceptable to both departments. Financial responsibility was accepted by Queensland Railways on the understanding that Commonwealth subsidies would be available.

A basic plan for Queensland Railways air raid shelters, dated 24 March 1942, shows a 42 feet (13 m) long reinforced concrete shelter that was 12 feet 0.5 inches (3.670 m) wide. The walls were 12 inches (300 mm) thick, with the front and back walls both having 11 dog-legged ventilation holes set high in the wall; and the roof, set flush with the side of the walls, was 6" to 7" thick. No concrete floor is indicated on the plan. The two entrances were 2 feet 6 inches (0.76 m) wide, and were located at each end of the front face of the shelter; recessed 3 feet 6.5 inches (1.080 m) back from the front wall. Internal blast walls form entrance corridors at each end that make a 90 degree turn into the main internal space of the shelter, which was 32 feet 11 inches (10.03 m) long by 10 feet 0.5 inches (3.061 m) wide, being 8 feet 5 inches (2.57 m) from floor to ceiling. This design is similar to the "pillbox" shelters used in the main streets of Brisbane.

The drawing was signed by Charles Da Costa, the Principal Railway Architect. Da Costa had been a specialist in reinforced concrete design for some time. He trained as a pupil of T. S. Martin of Sydney from 1905, joining Queensland Railways in 1907 as a Junior Draftsman. After retrenchment in 1921, he began private practise as an architect and structural designer in Brisbane. Later he worked for Burns Philp and Company, and in 1935 he rejoined Queensland Railways as an architect. He became Principal Architect in 1938 and retired in 1955.

From existing records, it appears that public air raid shelters at a number of railway stations, both within and outside Brisbane, shared a similar pillbox design. Known shelters of this type include the surviving shelters at Maryborough, Landsborough, Shorncliffe and Toowoomba, and demolished shelters at Gaythorne, Sandgate, Yeerongpilly, Caboolture, and South Brisbane. A possible pillbox shelter appears on a 1961 map of Townsville railway station, but it is labelled as a "Records Office". A 1948 Queensland Railways plan for converting an air raid shelter into a platform waiting shelter also shows the pillbox design. Other known post-war air raid shelter conversions include Shorncliffe (toilets), Sandgate (refreshment stall), and Caboolture (toilets).

The dimensions of the shelter at Landsborough match exactly the March 1942 plan signed by Da Costa, whereas the shelter at Shorncliffe has an overhanging roof slab. The surviving Maryborough shelter (two were built) appears to be a variant of the standard pillbox, where the doorways are close to the front wall and open directly into the main interior space of the shelter (facing towards the centre), rather than facing towards the rear of the shelter and leading into the narrower end sections. The Toowoomba railway station's two public shelters (one of which still exists) also used this entrance design.

Shelters appear to have been built at large stations, busy suburban commuter stations, and stations which had refreshment rooms. The latter would have been a vulnerable target for aircraft while passengers were disembarked for a meal. Queensland Railways station plans indicate that at least 23 stations on the North Coast line between Brisbane and Cairns had refreshment rooms at some time before World War II. At least five of these stations, plus possibly Townsville, had one or more air raid shelters marked on post-war site maps. These stations were Caboolture, Landsborough, Maryborough, Gladstone, and Rockhampton.

Of the public shelters built along the North Coast line, only the shelters at Landsborough and Maryborough still exist. In the Brisbane metropolitan area, most railway public shelters were demolished in the 1950s and 1960s, and only the Shorncliffe shelter has survived. The only other known surviving railway public shelter in Queensland is at Toowoomba railway station.

== Description ==
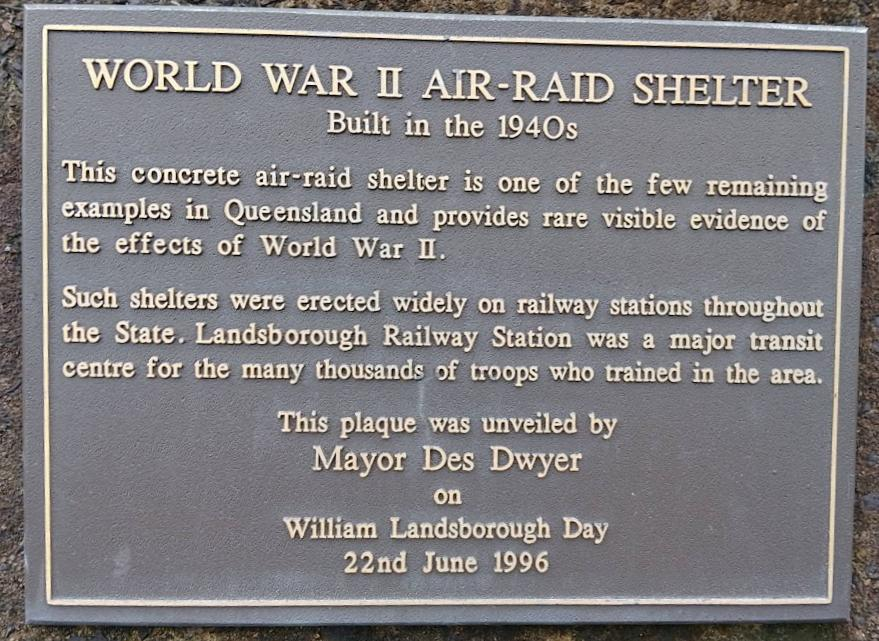
Plaque on the western wall

The Landsborough Railway Station's public air raid shelter is situated on the southern end of the north-bound platform at Landsborough Railway Station on the Sunshine Coast line between Mooloolah and Beerwah.

The air raid shelter is a simple, box-shaped building constructed entirely from reinforced concrete. It is rectangular and symmetrical in plan and measures approximately 12.8 by 3.7 metres (42 ft × 12 ft) and is oriented north–south along the platform.

The shelter is accessed from the east by recessed entrance corridors at each end of the building. These are formed from internal blast walls which turn 90 degrees into the main internal space of the shelter. The floor of the internal space is bare ground and some graffiti has been applied to the internal walls over time. It has an internal height of approximately 2.5 metres (8 ft 2 in).

The reinforced concrete walls and roof are approximately 300 millimetres (12 in) thick and 150–175 millimetres (5.9–6.9 in) thick respectively and have an off-form finish to both interior and exterior faces. The roof is flush with the walls and tapers to the outer edges. Eleven dog-legged ventilation slots are located along both the eastern and western elevations. The southern- most access corridor has been sealed with a recent solid-core door and the northernmost corridor, accessed via two concrete steps down to the shelter, has been closed off with a recent galvanised steel security gate.

The shelter is surrounded by a maintained garden to the south and west at ground level and by the raised concrete and bitumen station platform on the northern and eastern sides.

== Heritage listing ==
Landsborough Air Raid Shelter was listed on the Queensland Heritage Register on 3 April 2009 having satisfied the following criteria.

The place is important in demonstrating the evolution or pattern of Queensland's history.

The Landsborough Air Raid Shelter is important as a surviving component of the Air Raid Precautions that were implemented as part of the defence of Queensland during World War II. Designed to afford protection for civilian and military travellers at Landsborough railway station in the event of a Japanese air raid, the shelter is important in demonstrating the impact of World War II on Queensland.

The place demonstrates rare, uncommon or endangered aspects of Queensland's cultural heritage.

The place is a rare surviving example of a public air raid shelter built by Queensland Railways during World War II. It is one of only two railway station shelters surviving on the North Coast railway line, the other being located at Maryborough. Only four such shelters survive in Queensland, the only Australian state to build air raid shelters at railway stations.

The place is important in demonstrating the principal characteristics of a particular class of cultural places.

The shelter is a good example of a public air raid shelter designed by Queensland Railways during World War II to provide protection for the travelling public during air raids. Characteristic of air raid shelters constructed in Queensland, it is sited to accommodate a floating population concentration, is rectangular in plan, has reinforced concrete blast walls and roof, two entrances to the same side and dog-legged air vents to the long sides.
