= Maryborough railway station, Queensland =

Maryborough
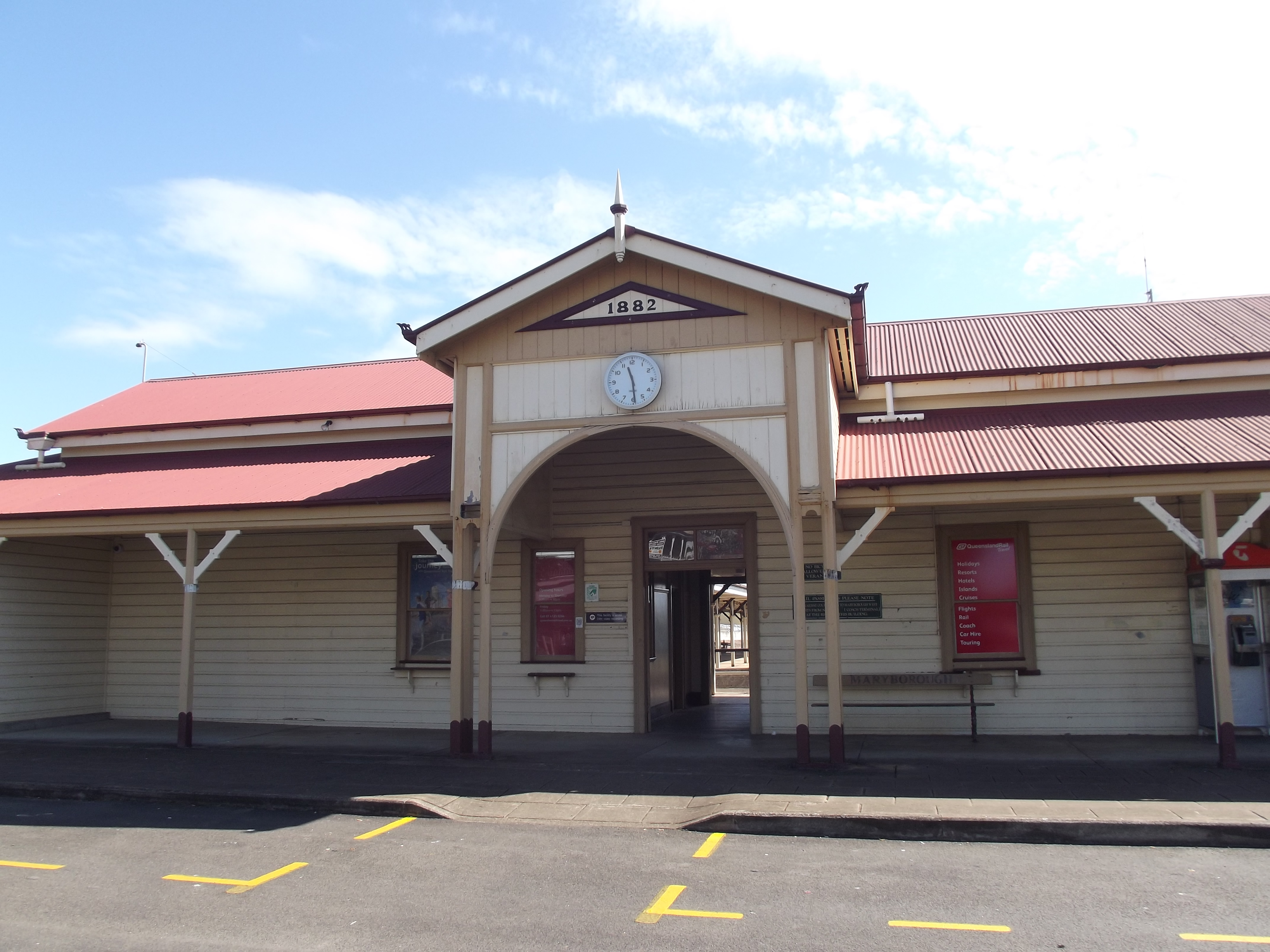
- Station front in July 2012

General information
- Location: Lennox Street, Maryborough
- Coordinates: 25.5385°S 152.6999°E
- Owner: Queensland Rail
- Operator: Traveltrain
- Line: North Coast
- Distance: 263.47 kilometres from Roma Street
- Platforms: 2 (1 island)

Construction
- Structure type: Ground

History
- Opened: 1878
Location

Maryborough Railway Station Complex and Air Raid Shelter
- Location within Queensland
- Location: Lennox Street, Maryborough, Fraser Coast Region, Queensland, Australia

History
- Design period: 1870s–1890s (Late 19th century)
- Built: 1878–1890, 1878–1890, 1878–1890

Site notes
- Architect: Chief Engineer for Queensland Railways Department

Queensland Heritage Register
- Official name: Maryborough Railway Station Complex and Air Raid Shelter
- Type: state heritage
- Designated: 21 October 1992
- Reference no.: 600702
- Type: Residential: Detached house
- Theme: Moving goods, people and information: Using rail; Building settlements, towns, cities and dwellings: Dwellings
- Builders: John Roddam & John Walker

Maryborough railway station is a heritage-listed railway station at Lennox Street, Maryborough, Fraser Coast Region, Queensland, Australia. It is on the North Coast line serving the city of Maryborough. It was designed by Chief Engineer of the Queensland Railways Department and built from 1878 to 1890 by John Roddam & John Walker. It was added to the Queensland Heritage Register on 21 October 1992.

The station forecourt is served by Greyhound Australia coach services to Brisbane, Hervey Bay, Agnes Water and Cairns, and Premier Motor Services services to Brisbane and Cairns Queensland Rail operates services between Hervey Bay and Maryborough West railway station via Maryborough station.

Maryborough railway station opened in 1878, when an eight kilometre branch into Maryborough was built as part of the North Coast line. It was built as a terminal station. Beyond the station, the line continued to service the Walkers Limited (now Downer Rail) railway workshops and Mary River wharf. An air raid shelter was built into the station during World War II for protection of the staff in case an air raid occurred.

In 1924, a new station was built on the North Coast line at Baddow, that was used by through services. Terminating services continued to use Maryborough station. In 1989, a new seven kilometre alignment of the North Coast line was built as part of the electrification of the line. This included a new Maryborough West station, replacing both Maryborough and Baddow stations.

As at 2013, Maryborough railway station consists of one island platform and an extensive yard. Although the station and yard have been decommissioned, the branch line remains in use to service the Downer Rail workshops. The building fell into a state of disrepair, but was restored in the early 2000s. Queensland Rail maintains a presence on part of the station site in relation to rail freight and as a booking office, while other parts are being developed into a shopping centre.

The station complex is home to the Maryborough Whistle Stop Museum which focuses on the city's rail history.

== History ==
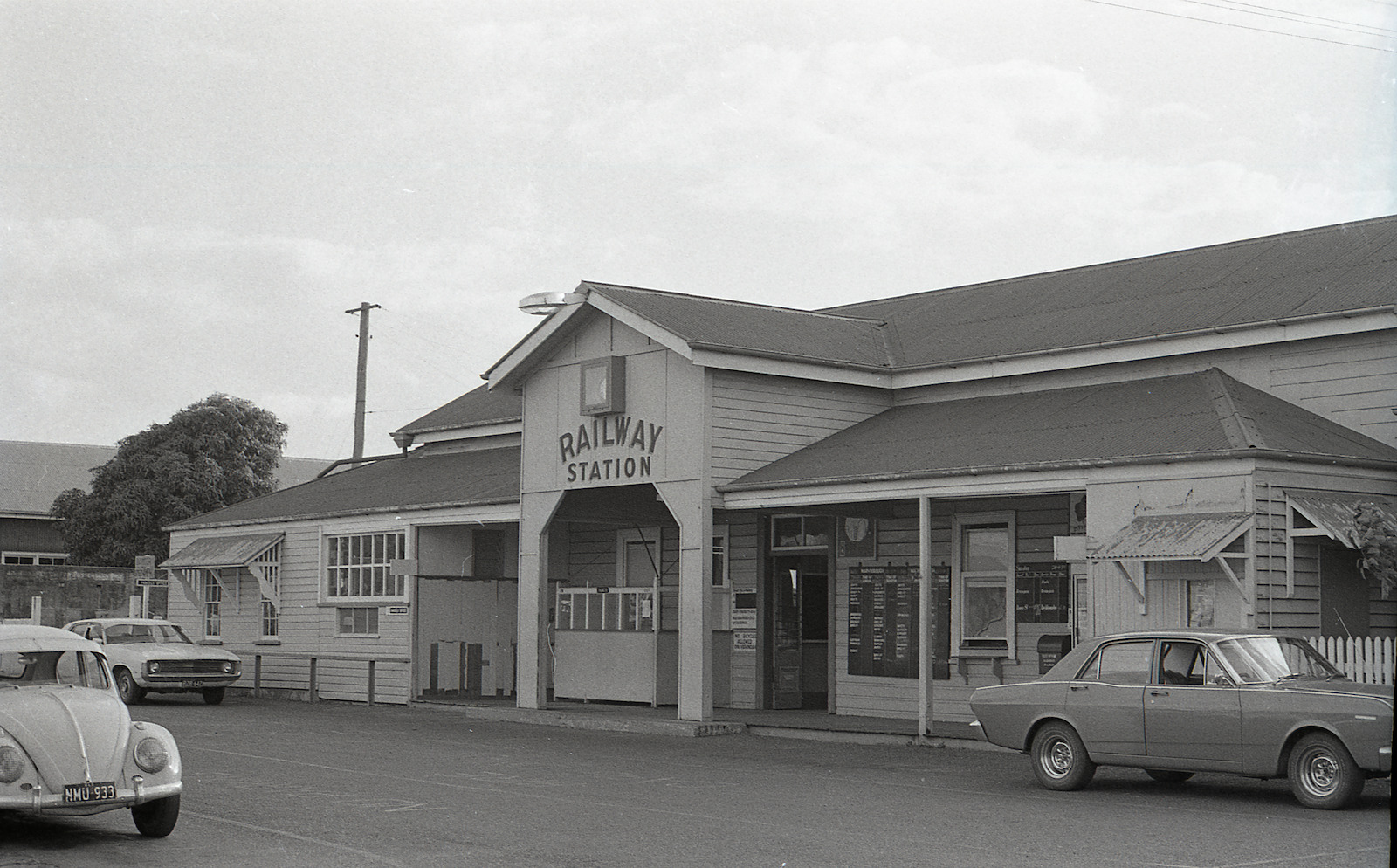
Railway Station Maryborough Queensland 1975

The railway complex on Lennox Street in Maryborough consists of a number of timber buildings constructed between 1878 and the 1930s, as well as a brick and concrete platform and a concrete air raid shelter built in 1942. The Maryborough railway station was built as the terminus of a railway network that radiated from Maryborough, transporting timber, coal, sugar and other agricultural products to the wharves on the Mary River. Maryborough was also a busy rail terminal for passenger traffic. Although the Maryborough railway station is no longer used, the station buildings are a picturesque reminder of significant past economic activity and transport arrangements within the region.

Settlement at Maryborough commenced in September 1847 when George Furber established a wool-store on the south bank of the Mary River at the head of navigation. He was followed in June 1848 by Edgar Thomas Aldridge, and brothers Henry and Richard E. Palmer, who established their own wharves on the opposite riverbank, at a location now known as the original Maryborough town site at Baddow. In 1850 a new town site was surveyed to the east, at a downstream position which provided better access for shipping. Maryborough was gazetted a Port of Entry in 1859 and was proclaimed a municipality (the Borough of Maryborough) in 1861. Items shipped from Maryborough included wool, tallow, and timber and these were later followed by coal and sugar.

Maryborough grew quickly as the port for Gympie, where gold was discovered in October 1867, as it provided a route by ship to the Port of Maryborough, then overland south to Gympie, an alternative to the rough road running north from Brisbane. The long-term viability of the Gympie goldfield ensured the continued growth of Maryborough and the need for sawmills, foundries and construction firms. Coal mining on the Burrum River also needed Maryborough's construction industries and shipping. However, the Urangan Jetty in Hervey Bay, which opened in 1917, replaced Maryborough as the port for the coal mining and sugar industries. The closure of Walker's shipbuilding yards in 1974 spelled the end of Maryborough as a port.

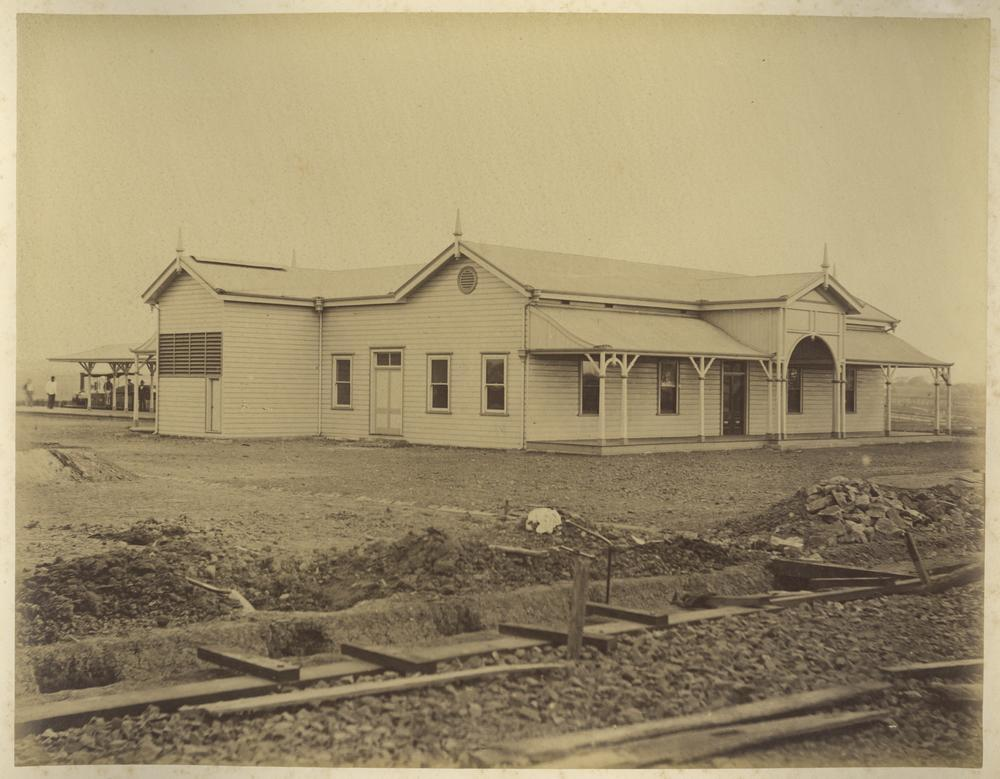
Maryborough railway station, ca. 1882

Maryborough's rise as a railway centre also resulted from the discovery of gold at Gympie. In August 1877 the Queensland Government approved three railways to connect mining towns to their principal ports: Townsville to Charters Towers; Bundaberg to Mount Perry; and Maryborough to Gympie. The railway to Gympie opened in August 1881, and in 1883 a branch line north to the coalfields at Burrum was started at Croydon Junction (Baddow), several kilometres northwest of Maryborough. When the line was extended north to Bundaberg in 1888 it followed this branch line, which meant that the North Coast line later bypassed Maryborough railway station and left it at the end of a dead-end spur.

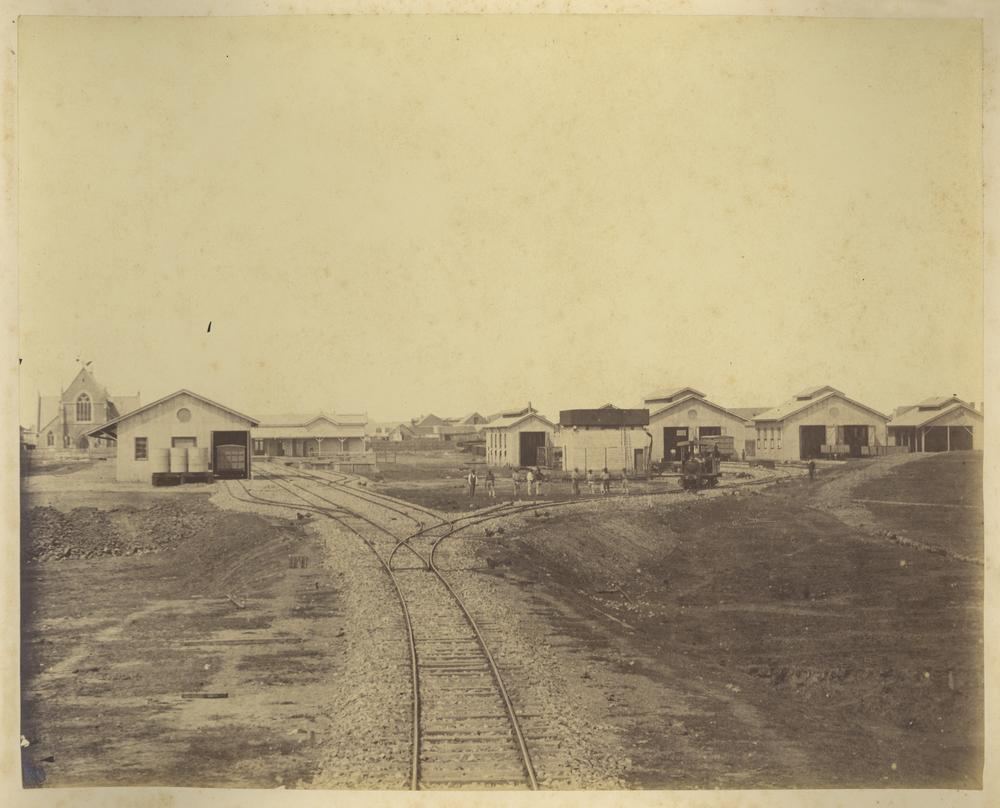
Maryborough railway station yard, 1882

Maryborough railway station became the centre of a busy network of branch lines. A short branch line was built through the Queen's Park Botanic Gardens to the wharf area in 1880, and in 1883 this was extended eastwards alongside the river north of Kent Street to the Walkers Limited foundry and shipyards. It was later extended to the Maryborough Sugar Factory (established 1894). A branch line connecting to Maryborough was also opened from Theebine, south of Tiaro, to Kilkivan in 1886, and was later extended to Murgon, Proston, Windera, Kingaroy, Tarong and Nanango (the latter by 1911). A branch line from Mungar, south of Maryborough, to Broweena opened in 1889, and this line eventually extended to Gayndah, Mundubbera and Monto (1929). Coal from the Burrum fields eventually required better port facilities and a branch line was built to Pialba in 1896, from Colton railway station (just north of Aldershot), between Maryborough and Burrum. This branch was extended to Urangan in 1913.

Engine and carriage maintenance workshops were built and expanded in Maryborough from 1880. Henry Taylor (junior) won the contract for a machine shop in January 1880, and this was extended in 1881 and 1884. The workshops, which were located to the south-west of the station, became less important after the Maryborough system was linked to the rest of Queensland in 1891. They are no longer extant, having been demolished for a shopping centre in the late 1990s.

After the line to Gympie was approved in 1877, drawings for buildings at the Maryborough station were prepared by the Engineering Branch of the Department of Railways. The site chosen for the Maryborough railway station was centrally located on a municipal park reserve. In 1878 construction at the site included a station master's residence, engineer's office (non-extant), store and blacksmith's workshop. A large programme of works in the years 1879 and 1880 saw the construction of a goods' shed, passenger station, closets and urinals, 30-foot (9.1 m) turntable, loading banks, station gates and fences and a semaphore signal. The timber station building was handsome, yet modest in scale. A foreman's cottage was constructed in 1881 and a locomotive shed was built in 1882. In 1884 a gatehouse was built at the Ferry Street entrance, and new offices for the traffic manager and engineers were built the same year. In 1885 and 1886 a coal depot and a forkline were built, and the turntable was taken up. A new locomotive shed was built in 1900.

=== 1878 station master's residence (192 Lennox Street) ===
Drawings for the residence were approved by Chief Engineer Henry Charles Stanley on 16 April 1878. The builders were John Roddam and John Walker. In 1894 a verandah and an additional room were added on the south-west side. After 1896 alterations were made to the rear of the house, linking the formerly detached kitchen and service wing to the house. The building was later used as the district traffic manager's residence, then as the district superintendent's residence by 1935 until about 1975, before being used by Queensland Rail as quarters for staff. Conservation work was undertaken to this building in 2012.

=== Administration complex ===
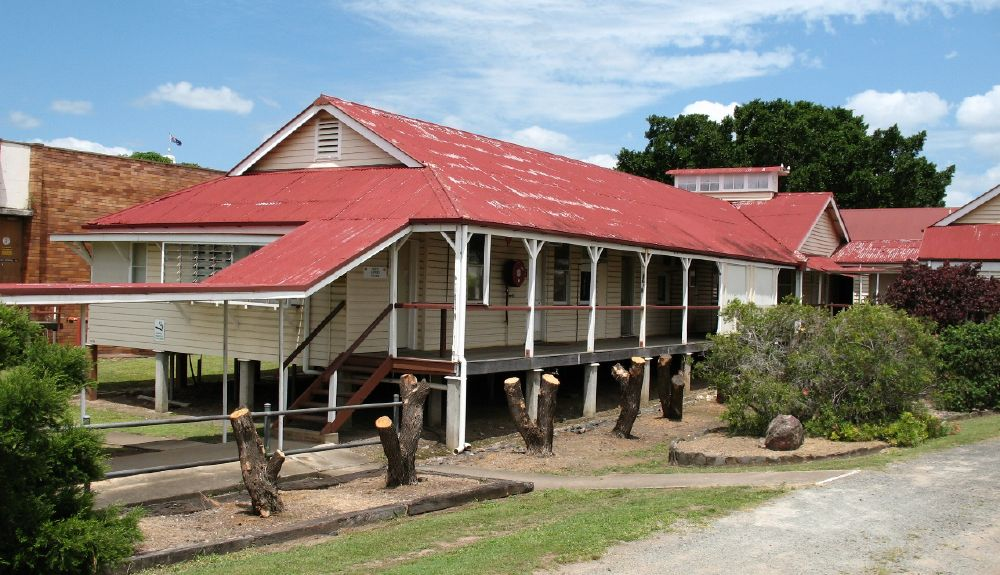
Loco office from the north-west, 2007

In 1884 drawings were made for new offices to replace the original (1878) traffic manager and engineers office. In plan the new building was a 42-by-18-foot (12.8 by 5.5 m) rectangle containing four offices with verandahs to three sides. Additions were made to the south-west side later in 1884, and in 1911 a small rear addition was made for the traffic manager and Telegraph Office (later the pay office and ladies toilet). Soon after the wagon and traffic offices were added to the rear, and in 1920 the loco office, with four open verandahs, was relocated to its present position behind the wagon and traffic offices. By 1920, there were more offices at the northern end of the traffic manager and Engineer's Office, and it was linked to the wagon and traffic offices in 1920. The complex was used by Queensland Rail as office space until 2008.

=== 12 ton weighbridge ===
This was extant by 1937.

=== Railway station building ===
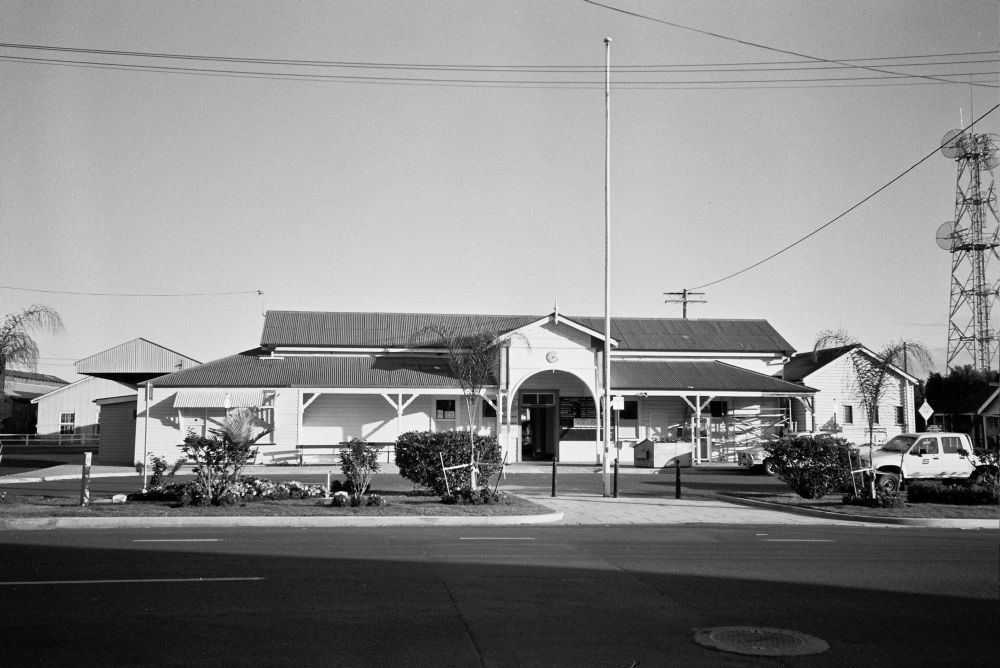
Maryborough railway station building, 1994

Although the architect is unknown, drawings for the first stage of the station building were approved by Henry Charles Stanley on 24 October 1879, and the contract was awarded to Henry Taylor (junior) on 8 Jan 1880, for £1325. A head station building and a short platform were built. On 24 December 1892 chief draughtsman Henrick Hansen approved alterations to the station and the main platform verandah, the demolition of the buildings extending to the north-west of the head station, and the enlargement of the lamp room. This contract was awarded to John Kyle on 24 January 1893, for £1176. The Station Master's office was enlarged in 1912.

=== Guards' room and porters' store ===
The guards' room was built in 1917, and the porters' store existed by 1937 as an extension on the north-west end.

=== Goods shed ===
The design for the goods shed was approved by HC Stanley on 8 July 1879, and the contract was awarded to G and E Negus in September 1879, for £698. The shed was 100 by 36 feet (30 by 11 m), and included an office, warehouse crane, and docks. It had a raised timber floor and a single rail track running through the shed against the south-west wall. Four individual loading dock entrances penetrated the north-east wall, and a 50-foot (15 m) outside loading platform was located at the north end. An extension was approved by Stanley on 4 October 1881, and Charles Whiting won the contract for £629. The extension to the south-west side of the goods shed was 66 feet (20 m) long, with two docks and a warehouse crane. In 1908 a new office was built at the south-east end of building, and this was later extended. The office had an open verandah by 1920.

=== Main platform ===
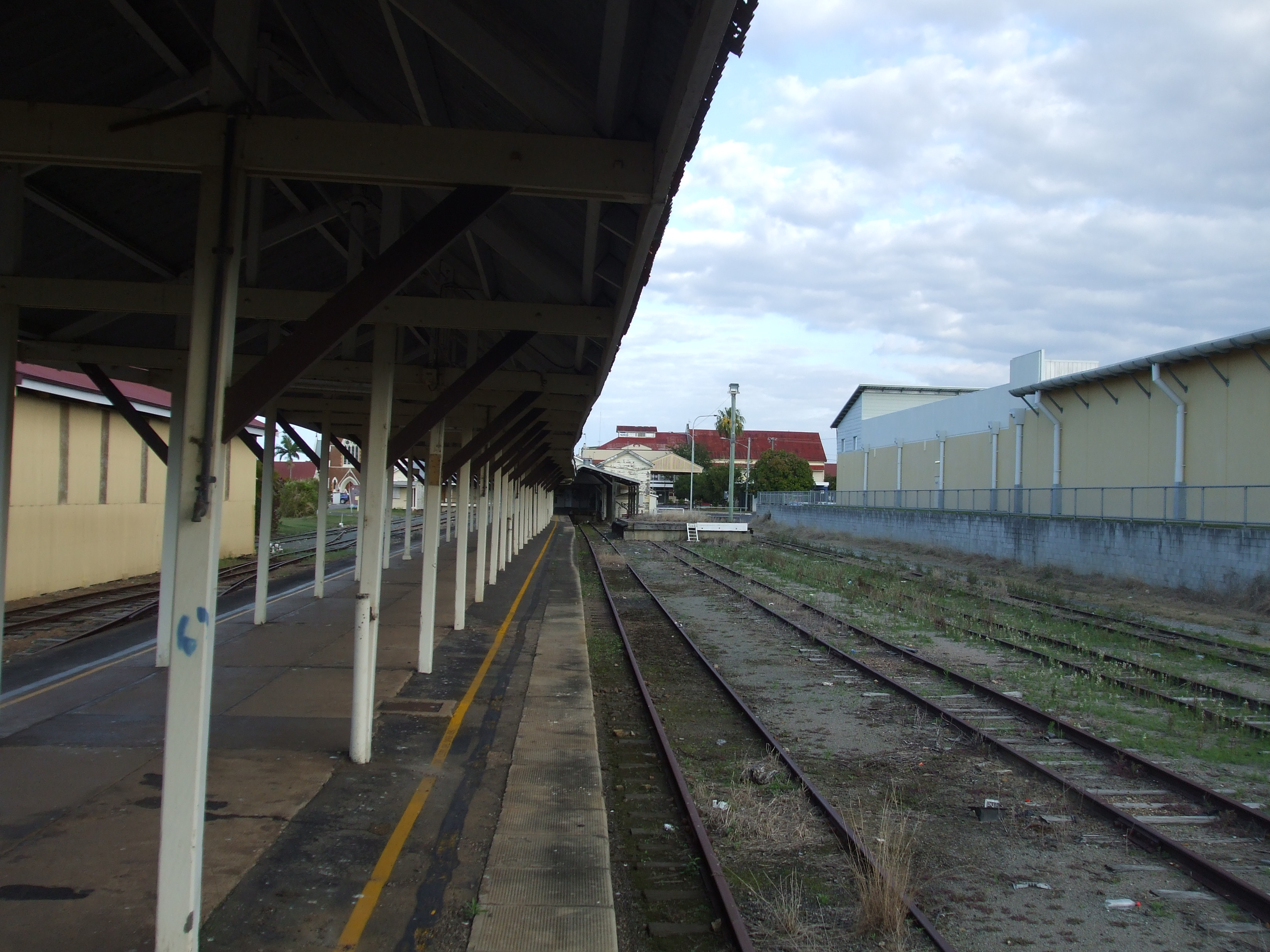
Platform and track, 2010

In 1880 the platform configuration included a covered verandah platform at the rear of the station building, plus a short uncovered platform extending to the north-west. In 1892 Hansen approved a platform verandah extension of seven bays by three bays wide, between the station building and a lamp room (which later became refreshment rooms), the carriage shed at the end of the platform was moved, and a fourth siding was built on the south-west side of the platform. Between 1893 and 1925 the island platform was extended several times to the north-west, to a total of 45 bays. In 1925 drawings for extending the main platform verandah included the last 24 bays of the current platform.

=== Former refreshment rooms ===
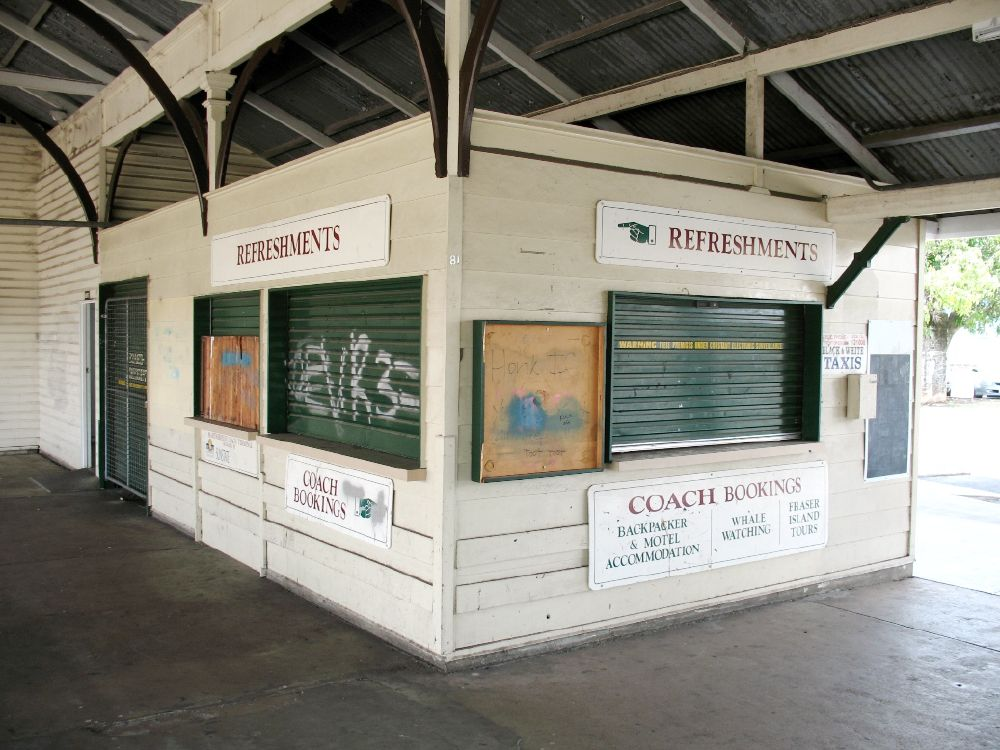
1990s refreshment kiosk

The first (south-east) portion of the original refreshment room was built in the 1890s, and may have been a lamp room beforehand. It was doubled in size in 1909, and was closed in 1968. It has since been used for storage. A new refreshment booth was built to the south-east in the 1990s, under the main platform verandah.

=== Air raid shelter ===
One air raid shelter survives of two built in the early 1940s to the south-west of the station building. The North Coast railway line was extremely busy during World War II, and the construction of air raid shelters at Maryborough railway station was probably linked to this increased wartime traffic as well as to Maryborough's value as an industrial target and transport hub. Government regulations regarding the safety of the population also prompted the building of shelters. In the Protection of Persons and Property Order No.1, gazetted 23 December 1941, Queensland Premier William Forgan Smith ordered the Brisbane City Council to construct 200 public surface shelters in the city area. Another 24 local governments in Queensland's coastal areas were ordered to produce surface or trench shelters for the public.

A large number of businesses also had to build air raid shelters. Owners of any building in the coastal areas where over 30 people would normally be present at any one time were required to build shelters either within the building, or adjacent to it. However, there was disagreement over who was responsible for building shelters at railway stations. At a conference in late February 1942 the Secretary for Health and Home Affairs, Ned Hanlon, stressed that if Queensland Railways did not act on building public air raid shelters it would make it harder for the Queensland Government to insist that other businesses and local authorities do so. It was recommended that the Department of Public Works proceed to construct shelters on or adjoining railway premises.

On 2 March 1942 a memorandum from the Undersecretary of the Department of Public Works reported that Queensland Railways had already built shelters for its employees at some of the larger train stations, and it recommended that a further 28 full-size public surface shelters, three half-size shelters, and three sets of trenches, be built outside Brisbane, at a total cost of £16,150. Most of the recommended surface shelters and trenches were on the North Coast railway line, at 19 stations from Nambour to Cairns.

Queensland was apparently the only Australian state to build air raid shelters at its railway stations. The survival of the public air raid shelter at Maryborough railway station is fortuitous, given the rate of shelter demolition after the war. The only other railway air raid shelters to survive are the Landsborough Air Raid Shelter and the ones at Toowoomba railway station and Shorncliffe railway station.

=== 1878 engineer's office ===
William Elliot and James Patterson signed a contract to build the Engineer's Office on 20 February 1878. In plan it was initially an 18-by-38-foot (5.5 by 11.6 m) rectangle, with four rooms and a verandah. Alterations and additions in 1884 were signed by HC Stanley. Thomas Ferguson and Thomas Holden were the contractors. The office was turned into the traffic manager's quarters with two extra rooms at the rear, a verandah around the whole building, and a covered way to new detached kitchen wing. The building was being used as the station master's residence by 1935. It was moved 10 metres (33 ft) to the north-east in c. 1999.

Maryborough station remained busy until the 1980s. During 1962 there were 240 regular trains each week, including 147 passenger services. In 1965 Baddow on the main northern line had 331 regular services each week and 48 steam locomotives operated from the Maryborough Locomotive Depot at this time. The Sunlander did not stop at Maryborough however, and it dropped any passengers for Maryborough at Baddow where a taxi service (an engine and van) completed the journey. All passenger services from Baddow to Maryborough ceased on 20 April 1986, to be replaced by a minibus service, and in 1988 a main line upgrade by-passed Baddow. A new station was established at Maryborough West. In late 2007 Queensland Railways still had a freight train presence at the Maryborough station yards.

In April 2010 the 1878 engineer's office was substantially damaged by fire and, after a no prudent and feasible argument was made, approval was given for its remains to be demolished. It stood at the southernmost end of the complex on Lennox Street and comprised two adjacent single-storey, timber-framed structures, the former office on Lennox Street and a kitchen building to the rear. Clad in weatherboards, both parts stood on concrete stumps with timber slats between them. The former office structure had a roof made up of a series of gablets, two terminating a gable running parallel to Lennox Street and two terminating twin gables facing the rear of the site. Each gablet had decorated bargeboards supported on timber brackets and single vents filled with timber louvres. The former kitchen building comprised a gable running parallel to Lennox Street with a broken-back skillion connecting to the office and separate skillion at the rear. Its stove recess was clad in corrugated metal sheeting and had a separate skillion roof. The land on which the Engineer's Office stood was removed from within the heritage boundary for this place in 2013.

== Description ==
The Maryborough railway station complex of timber buildings runs for some distance along Lennox Street, contributing greatly to the streetscape. The main railway station building also acts as a focal end point to the vista along Ellena Street. Four railway lines approached the station (which is aligned south-west to north-east) from the north-west. The station buildings, working along Lennox Street from north-east to south-west, include:

=== 1878 station master's residence ===
This is a single-storeyed timber residence with verandahs to the southern, eastern and northern sides. It is set on concrete stumps on gently sloping ground. The house is clad in painted weatherboards and features French doors with fanlights, which provide access from the rooms in the main residence to the verandahs, and a mixture of 6:6, 4:4 and 1:1 vertical sliding sash windows to the kitchen and later rear extensions. A concave iron window hood returning at each end protects the triple sash window with louvered shutters on the front projecting gable, which also features bargeboards with supporting brackets along the eaves and a finial at the apex.

The building is asymmetrically arranged with a number of corrugated zincalume-clad gables of varying heights and skillion-roofed verandah awnings. The verandahs to the south and east are enclosed with lattice panels and the awnings are supported on chamfered timber posts with decorative capitals and brackets. The verandah to the north (former fernery) is enclosed with lattice and timber louvers. The rear extensions and original kitchen wing are also constructed with gabled roof forms interconnecting at varying heights. Many of the sash windows have sunshade awnings. A skillion-roofed garage at the rear of the kitchen is not of cultural heritage significance.

The interior of the residence has been altered, but retains the original 4-room layout from the 1878 residence and the 2-room 1894 extension. The front door opens into a long hall, which leads off to rooms on either side and then to a large communal room. This front portion of the residence retains early French doors and window joinery, as well as a fireplace with decorative tiles and ironwork and timber mantelpiece in the front north-east bedroom (former lounge). This is the only fireplace in the house. The rear wing of the house has been altered to accommodate multiple bedrooms for railway staff. The internal walls are clad with sheet material over the original tongue and groove linings except in the kitchen and bathroom. The building is set in an established garden with mature trees.

=== Administration complex ===
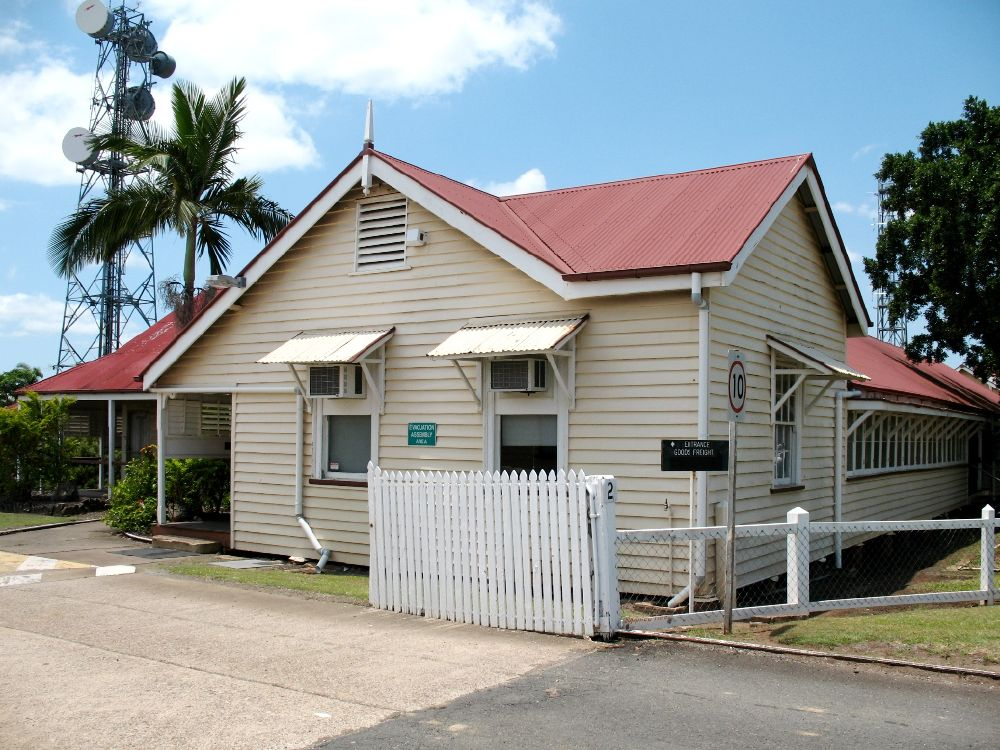
Traffic manager and engineer's office, from the south-west, 2007

The traffic manager and engineer's office is timber-framed, low-set, and is clad in weatherboards. It has a gabled corrugated iron-clad roof. Most of the front verandah has been enclosed and the walls to the verandah have been removed. Internal partitions are tongue and groove-lined. The original open rear verandah links with the wagon and traffic offices, forming a covered way.

The wagon and traffic offices are also low-set and timber-framed, and are clad with weatherboards. The gabled corrugated iron roof has a ridge lantern skylight which is closed off at ceiling level. The building is linked across two open verandahs with the traffic manager's and engineer's office to the south-east, and is also connected to the loco office to the north-west.

The loco office is a low-set gabled timber building with a corrugated iron roof, set on concrete stumps and clad with chamferboards. Three of its verandahs are now enclosed and incorporated into the internal space. The open south-west verandah has stop-chamfered timber posts, simple strut brackets, and a timber handrail.

The pay office is a weatherboard-clad timber structure with a gabled corrugated iron roof, connected by covered verandahs to the traffic manager and engineer's office and to the former loco office to the north. A small extension to the north-east corner accommodates a ladies toilet. Pay windows and barriers remain on the western side verandahs, and a concrete strong room extends out from the northern wall.

=== 12 ton weighbridge ===
The weighbridge consists of a small timber skillion-roofed shelter with a scales mechanism inside, and a weighbridge steel plate surrounded by four timber bollards and concrete pads located to the south-west of the shelter.

=== Railway station building ===
The station is a single-storeyed, timber-framed building, set at ground level. It is clad in chamferboards and has a gabled corrugated iron roof. The rear roof extends over the original station platform and is supported at its outer edge by unusual tapered stop-chamfered timber posts with octagonal capitals and strut brackets. The main front entrance consists of a projecting gabled portico supported on pairs of timber posts and features a timber arch and gable infill. A central passageway leads through the station to the main platform behind the building. There are skillion-roofed front verandahs, partly enclosed on the south-west side, either side of the portico. These verandahs have stop-chamfered posts and timber strut brackets that match those of the station platform. There is an extension at the south-west end of the station with skillion-roofed structures and a bracketed hood over the front windows. A separate timber-framed ladies waiting room and toilets with a gabled roof adjoins the north-east end of the station building. This has a domestic-scaled post-supported awning linked to the rear station platform. There are new male toilets in the former cloak room. A World War I railways honour board is located at the rear of the station beside the ticket office.

=== Guards' room and porters' store ===
This is a gable-roofed timber building, clad in weatherboards, located to the north-west of the north-eastern end of the station building.

=== Goods shed ===
The goods shed is a timber-framed, corrugated iron-clad building with a gable roof. It has a weatherboard-clad, hipped roof office extension to the south-east. There is an elevated loading dock along the north-east elevation. Projecting rafters over the loading dock have decorative shaped ends and are strutted off the outer wall. The roof of the goods shed is supported on large timber queen post trusses. An internal platform and rail line runs the length of the shed against the south-west wall. The office wing has an open verandah on the north-east elevation. A modern steel canopy has been added to the northwest end of the goods shed, but this is not historically significant and has not been included within the heritage boundary.

=== Main platform ===
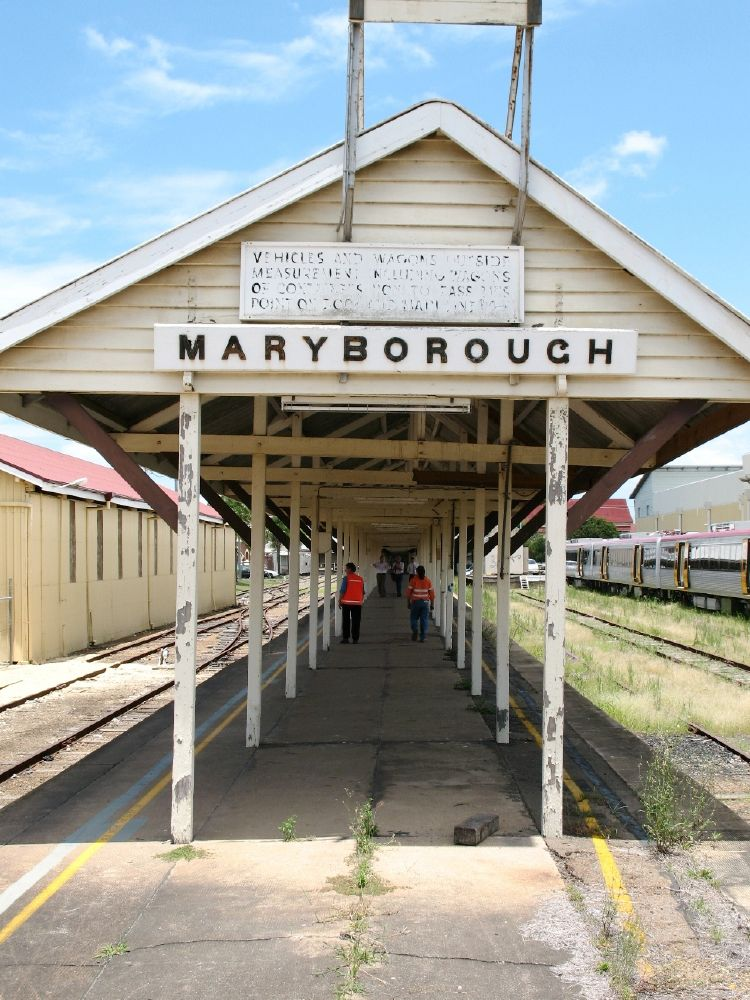
Maryborough railway station, platform from the north-west, 2007

The platform was constructed in stages. The first seven bays of the platform roof are three-bays wide, with exposed king-post trusses each with lower arched brackets, and side skillion extensions. These are supported on tapering chamfered timber posts with octagonal capitals and decorative strut brackets of similar design to that of the station. The roof is clad in corrugated iron. The next four and a half bays (two bays wide) are to the north-east of the original refreshment rooms and are an extension of the original design for the main station building. To the north-west of refreshment rooms is a new canopy erected to cover a steam locomotive. From the refreshment rooms, the platform is an island, servicing tracks on both sides. The first nine bays maintain the original bell-cast roof profile, while the final 24 bays are a higher, simple pitched roof with stop chamfered timber posts and angle strut brackets. The roof to this section is of corrugated iron with curved ridge sheets and terminates at the north-west end with a weatherboard-sheeted gable, signage and surmounted clock housing. The tracks either side of the platform within the heritage boundary should be retained to assist interpretation of the site. A recent coach terminal has been added to the south-west side of the platform between the station and the former refreshment rooms, and a new canopy has been added northwest of the refreshment rooms, to shelter a historic locomotive. Neither of these two recent structures is historically significant.

=== Former refreshment rooms ===
The original refreshment rooms building is a timber-framed building clad with chamferboards. The gabled roof is clad in corrugated iron. The building is connected to the main station building by the platform and platform awnings. Internally the building consists of a kitchen and dining room area.

=== Air raid shelter ===
The shelter is a concrete structure 47 feet 6 inches (14.48 m) long, and 12 feet (3.7 m) wide. The flat concrete roof is 6 feet (1.8 m) thick, and the walls are 12 feet (3.7 m) thick. Doorways are located at each end of the north-east elevation, with each doorway being set in a recessed area that is stepped back 4 feet (1.2 m) from the end of the shelter, and 5 feet (1.5 m) from the front face of the shelter. A sign on the north-east elevation reads "Air Raid Shelter for Passengers Only". The shelter is used for storage, and electrical cables enter it above the double timber doors at the north-west end. There is a single timber door at the south-east end.

=== Grounds ===
There is a large fig tree (Ficus sp.) in front of the traffic manager and engineers office, and there are mature trees around the 1878 station master's residence.

== Heritage listing ==
Maryborough railway station was listed on the Queensland Heritage Register on 21 October 1992 having satisfied the following criteria.

The place is important in demonstrating the evolution or pattern of Queensland's history.

The Maryborough railway station (established in 1878) demonstrates the importance of Maryborough as a port for the export of the products of the interior. Although the Port of Maryborough declined after 1917, the railway station is a reminder of the past importance of the city to Queensland's export trade.

The complex of timber railway buildings in central Maryborough, including a residence, the station building and main platform verandah, nearby train tracks, guards' room and porters' store, refreshment rooms, goods shed, weighbridge, and administration buildings, also demonstrates the importance of Maryborough, until 1891, as the headquarters of a separate railway network. The original station master's house is a fine example of a residence built for Queensland Government Railways during the nineteenth century, and it also demonstrates the important status of Maryborough in the railway system of the time.

The air raid shelter is important as surviving evidence of the air raid precautions that were implemented as part of the defence of Queensland during World War II. Designed to afford protection for civilian and military travellers at Maryborough railway station in the event of a Japanese air raid, the shelter is important in demonstrating the impact of World War II on Queensland.

The place demonstrates rare, uncommon or endangered aspects of Queensland's cultural heritage.

The Maryborough railway station is rare as a substantially intact coastal terminal and system headquarters complex of timber buildings, established in the 1870s and 1880s.

The air raid shelter is a rare example of a concrete public air raid shelter designed by Queensland Railways during World War II to provide protection for the travelling public during air raids. It is one of only two railway station shelters surviving on the North Coast railway line, the other being located at Landsborough. Only four such shelters survive in Queensland, the only Australian state to build air raid shelters at railway stations.

The place is important in demonstrating the principal characteristics of a particular class of cultural places.

The existing railway sidings and timber buildings provide a highly intact example of a nineteenth century railway station complex that was expanded substantially in the early twentieth century. Significant components include a residence, main station building, goods shed, and ancillary buildings such as the weighbridge, guard's room and porter's store, refreshment rooms, and administration buildings, including a pay office. The pay windows and barriers to the pay office demonstrate the obsolete practice of workers queuing to collect their wages.

The core of the Maryborough railway station building, constructed in 1880, is the oldest timber station building to survive at a major Queensland railway station. The station building is substantially intact and its design is representative of Queensland Government Railways' best practice at the time. The extensions to the station building, and possibly the original building, are associated with the work of the important railway architect, Henrick Hansen.

The original station master's residence (erected in 1878) is a good example of an early and substantial Queensland Government Railways residence adapted to the sub-tropical climate with features including wide screened verandahs.

The place is important because of its aesthetic significance.

The timber railway buildings, and the large fig (Ficus sp.) tree in front of the traffic manager and engineer's office, have considerable aesthetic value and contribute significantly to the streetscape along Lennox Street. In particular, the railway station building, its early platform verandah, and the original station master's residence are of a handsome design.
