= FreightLink =

FreightLink was a railway freight operator in Australia that operated in the newly completed Adelaide–Darwin rail corridor between 2004 and 2010.

== History ==
A Darwin-bound FreightLink container train passes through Dry Creek in 2005

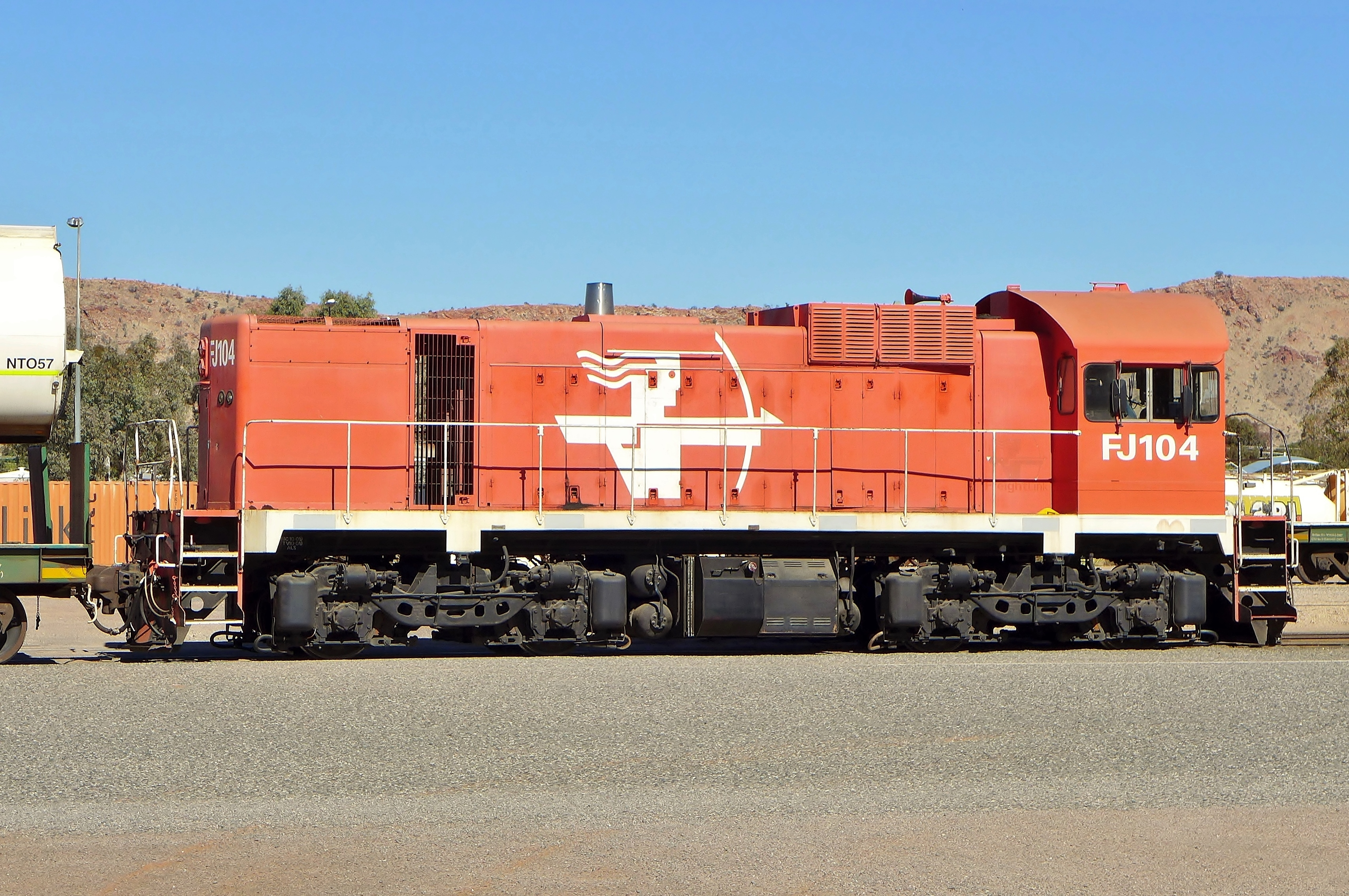
In 2015, five years after the company collapsed, a FreightLink logo remains on a GWA-owned J class diesel shunter in Alice Springs

In 2000, the AustralAsia Railway Corporation awarded the contract to build and operate the Adelaide-Darwin railway line as a Build, Own, Operate and Transfer project to the Asia Pacific Transport Consortium, which in turn awarded the contract to FreightLink to build and operate the project.

FreightLink commenced operations in January 2004 on the Tarcoola to Darwin line. FreightLink had intermodal terminals at Adelaide, Alice Springs, Tennant Creek, Katherine, and Darwin. It performed marketing, integrated service management and management of service providers. A number of operational activities were outsourced to specialist providers including train and terminal management, port terminal operations and rail maintenance.

In May 2008 the consortium of banks and infrastructure companies behind Freightlink decided to sell the railway and its operating company In June 2008 FreightLink announced that it would add an extra weekly rail service between Adelaide and Darwin due to growing demand, taking the total number of services to six.

During November 2008 the company was placed into voluntary administration. This resulted in FreightLink's bankers exercising their rights to appoint a receiver, KordaMentha which then took control of the company, as the deal to sell the company fell through after a small number of the banks funding FreightLink refused the terms of the sale to the preferred bidder.

On 9 June 2010, Genesee & Wyoming Australia (GWA) signed an agreement with the receivers to buy the assets of FreightLink for $334 million. It would be operated as part of GWA.

== Fleet ==
Diesel locomotives owned by FreightLink included:

Class	Image	Number in class	Units	Notes
FQ class		4	FQ01 - FQ04	New Build, used for mainline fright on the Adelaide - Darwin line.
FJ class		2	FJ104 - FJ105	Ex-Westrail, used for shunting at Alice Springs and Darwin.
