= AustralAsia Railway Corporation =

The AustralAsia Railway Corporation (AARC) was established in 1997 by the Government of the Northern Territory to build the Alice Springs to Darwin section of the Adelaide-Darwin Railway. The Government of South Australia holds 50% of its board positions and voting rights. It owns some of the infrastructure of the Alice Springs to Darwin railway and the lease of the Tarcoola to Alice Springs railway from the Federal Government, and leased (or subleased) them to FreightLink. In June 1999, it awarded the contract to build the Darwin to Alice Springs railway to the Asia Pacific Transport Consortium (APTC) as a Build, Own, Operate and Transfer operation. The lease runs until 2054.

The Federal Government contributed $165 million from the Centenary of Federation Fund, the Northern Territory Government contributed $165 million and the South Australian Government contributed $150 million to the AARC for the construction of assets by APTC and FreightLink that were later leased for a peppercorn rental to FreightLink. In addition, the three governments contributed about $26 million each, a total of $79 million in further funding to support the APTC directly, by way of mezzanine debt financing (subordinated debt), equity and contingent equity.
