= Commonwealth Railways NJ class =

Class of diesel locomotive

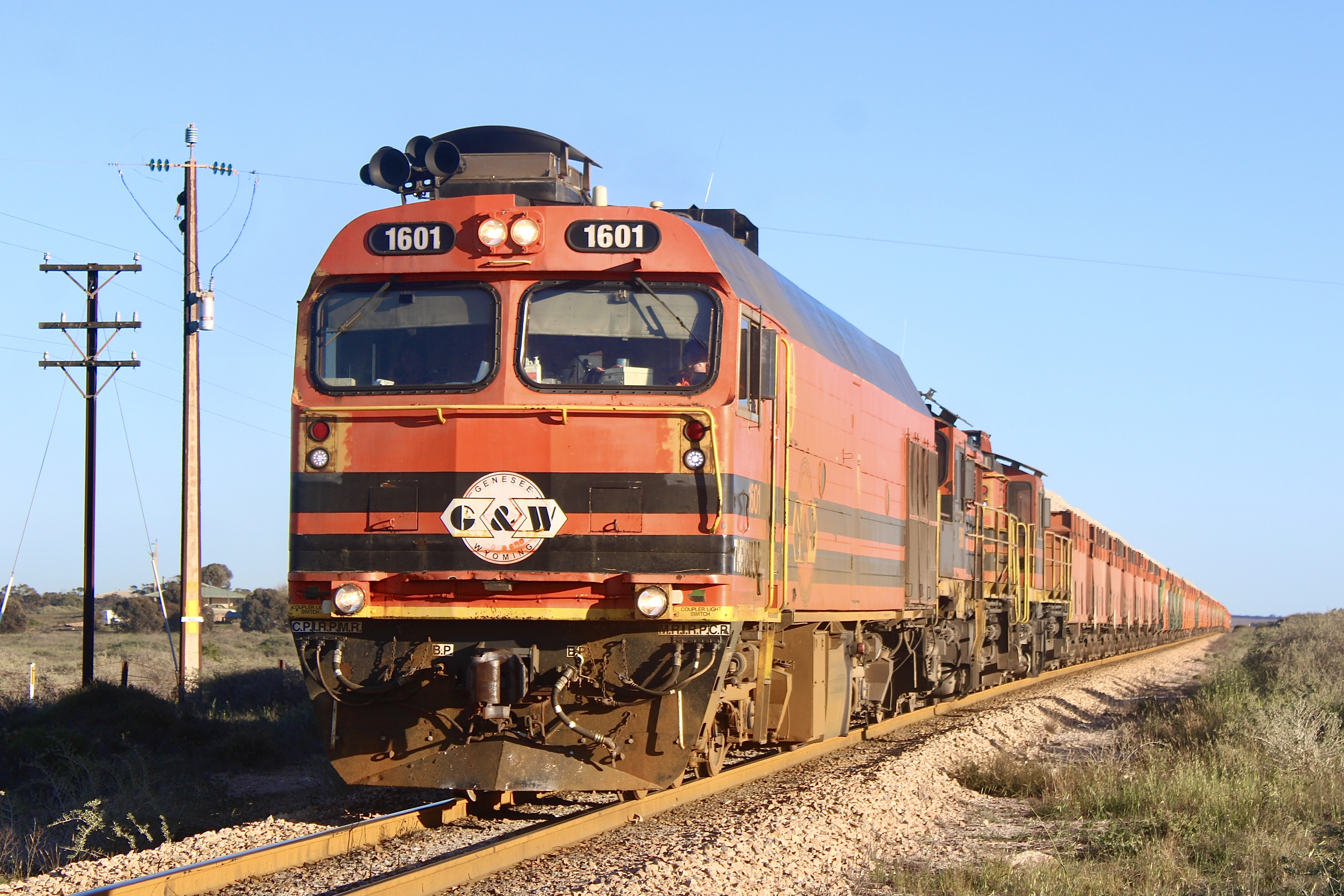
- Class leader 1601 (formerly NJ1) leading a One Rail Australia gypsum train near Ceduna, 2020.
Type and origin
- Power type: Diesel-electric
- Builder: Clyde Engineering, Granville
- Serial number: 70-728, 71-729 to 71-733
- Model: EMD JL22C
- Build date: 1971
- Total produced: 6
Specifications
- Configuration
  - UIC: Co-Co
- Gauge: 1,067 mm (3 ft 6 in)
- Loco weight: 67 t (66 long tons; 74 short tons)
- Fuel type: Diesel
- Prime mover: EMD 12-645E
- Engine type: V12
- Cylinders: 12
Performance figures
- Power output: 1,119 kW (1,501 hp)
Career
- Operators: Aurizon
- Number in class: 6
- Numbers: NJ1–NJ6
- Delivered: 1971
- First run: 1971
- Last run: 1971
- Current owner: Aurizon
- Disposition: 2 in service, 1 stored, 2 exported to South Africa, 1 scrapped as of 2023

The NJ class are a class of diesel locomotive built in 1971 by Clyde Engineering, Granville for the Commonwealth Railways for use on the Central Australia Railway.

== History ==
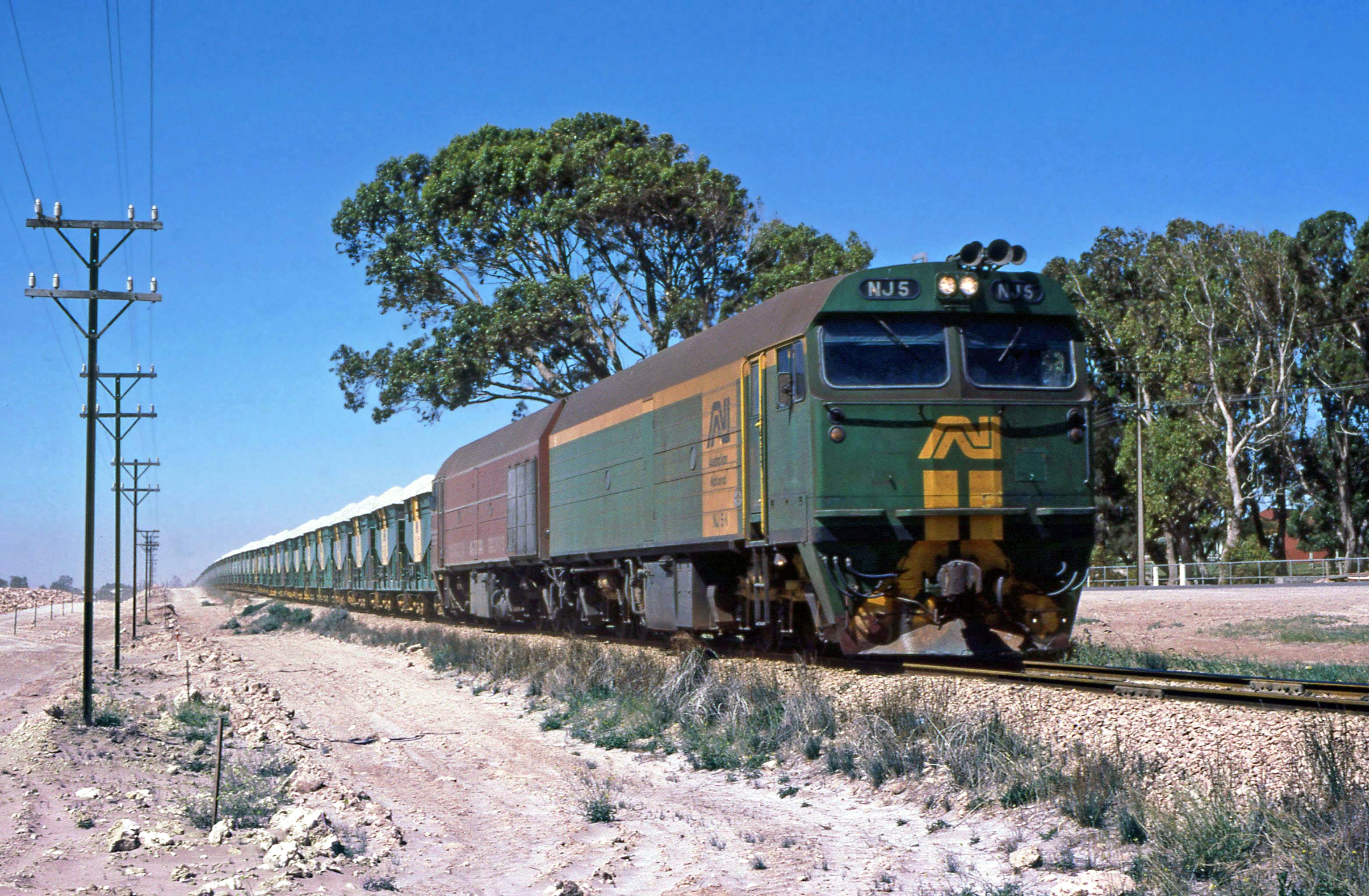
Gypsum train hauled by Australian National NJ5 and NJ3 near Ceduna, South Australia, 20 Jan 1989

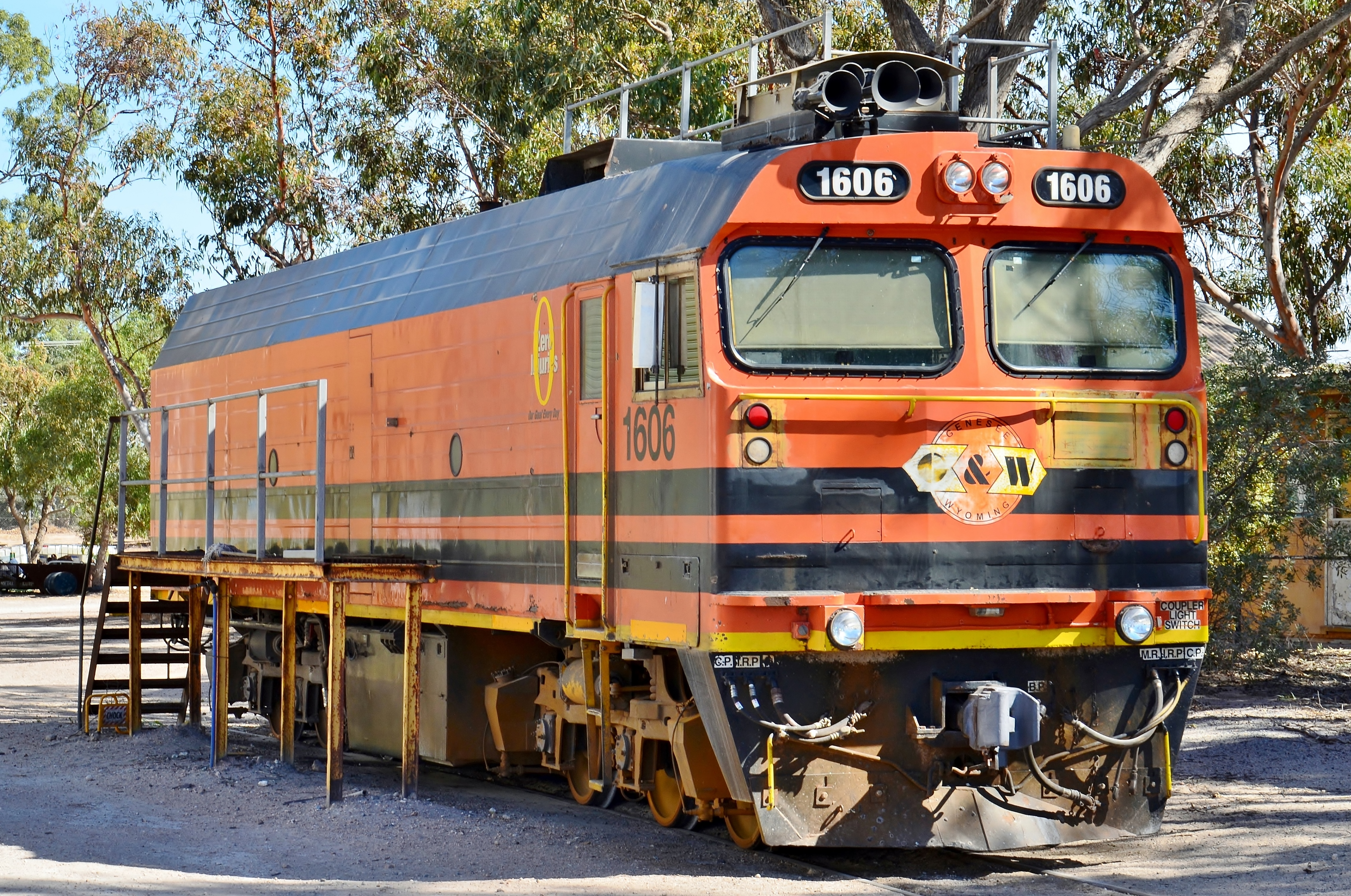
Genesee and Wyoming Australia (GWA) locomotive 1606 at Thevenard Maintenance Centre in 2017

In 1969, Commonwealth Railways ordered six single-cab NJ class locomotives from Clyde Engineering for use on the narrow gauge 1,067 mm (3 ft 6 in) Central Australia Railway between Marree and Alice Springs. They hauled freight trains and The Ghan. Built at Clyde Engineering's Granville factory, they featured many components from the company's new Kelso factory. Their cab was similar to that of the New South Wales 422 class locomotives that had recently been built.

In July 1975, all were included in the transfer of Commonwealth Railways to Australian National. Following the closure of the Central Australian Railway in December 1980 and their unsuitability for conversion to standard gauge, Australian National transferred them to its former Port Lincoln Division on Eyre Peninsula, South Australia. After a few teething problems, the class settled down and were employed hauling grain and gypsum services.

All six were sold with Australian National's South Australian operations to Australian Southern Railroad in August 1997 and renumbered as the 1600 class. Some were transferred to Australian Railroad Group to operate services in Western Australia. With the splitting up of Australian Railroad Group, two passed to QR National (later Aurizon) in February 2006 and four to Genesee & Wyoming Australia in June 2006.

In January 2015, the two Aurizon units were exported to Durban, South Africa.

In early 2019, 1604 (formerly NJ 4) was scrapped following a shunting accident at Cummins, South Australia in 2013. 1603 led the last GWA grain train to Cummins on 31 May 2019, and all 3 remaining NJs were moved to Thevenard to continue in-service hauling gypsum trains.

The owner of the 3 NJs, GWA was rebranded to One Rail Australia (ORA) in February 2020 when G&W sold their share of the company. ORA sent 1603 to Port Augusta for overhaul in June 2022, but this overhaul was stopped following Aurizon's takeover of ORA the following month. 1601 and 1606 were relegated to trailing units in 2023, and stored in 2025 following the relocation of Queensland Railways 2300 class locomotives to Thevenard.

== Names ==
- NJ1 was named after prime minister Ben Chifley, a former locomotive driver from Bathurst, near Kelso where many of the locomotives' components were manufactured. As of 2020, the locomotive unofficially carried the name "Thevenard" on the side of the locomotive cab, possibly reflecting the change to gypsum-only traffic for the motive power of the former South Australian Railways Port Lincoln Division.
