= CL class =

CL class may refer to:

- Commonwealth Railways CL class locomotive
- Mercedes-Benz CL-Class car
