= One Rail Australia =

Former Australian railway operator

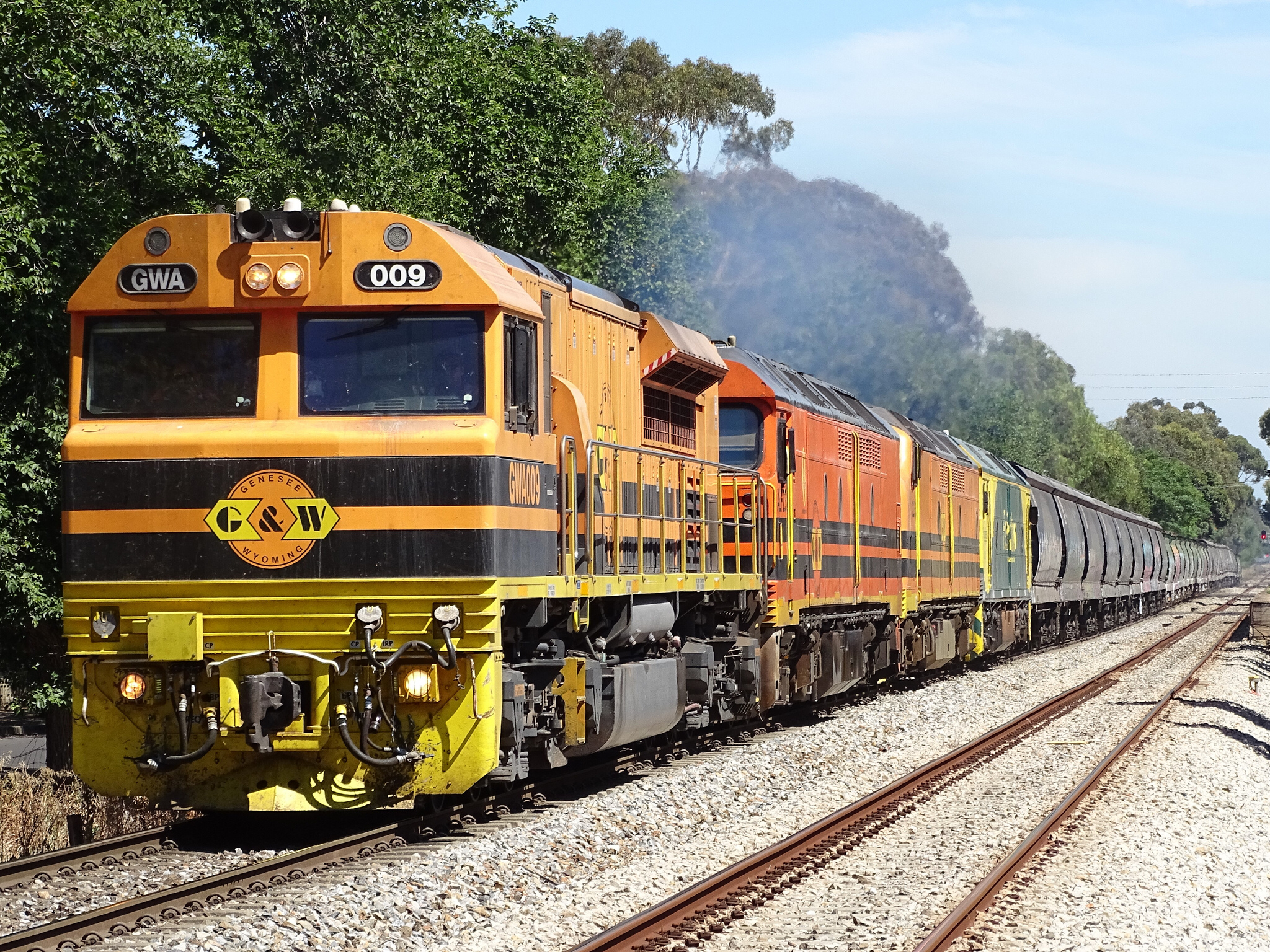
- In May 2019, a Genesee & Wyoming Australia standard-gauge grain train heads through Hawthorn, South Australia, bound for Tailem Bend
- Formerly: Australian Southern Railroad; Australian Railroad Group; Genesee & Wyoming Australia
- Industry: Railway operator
- Predecessor: Australian National
- Founded: 1 November 1997
- Founder: Genesee & Wyoming Inc
- Defunct: 29 July 2022 (sold)
- Fate: Acquired by Aurizon
- Successor: Aurizon; Magnetic Rail Group
- Headquarters: Keswick, Adelaide
- Area served: All mainland states
- Key people: Matthew Jones, General Manager
- Number of employees: 628 (July 2022)
- Website: 1rail.com.au

One Rail Australia was an Australian rail freight operator company. Founded by a United States short line railroad holding company, Genesee & Wyoming Inc, in 1997 as Australian Southern Railroad, and successively renamed Australian Railroad Group and Genesee & Wyoming Australia, it was renamed One Rail Australia in February 2020 after the American company sold its remaining shareholding. In July 2022, assets from the South Australian, Northern Territory and interstate operations of the company were sold to rail operator company Aurizon Holdings Limited. The remaining assets, relating to coal haulage in New South Wales and Queensland, were sold in February 2023 to Magnetic Rail Group.

== Corporate history ==
Progression of corporate structures to 2022

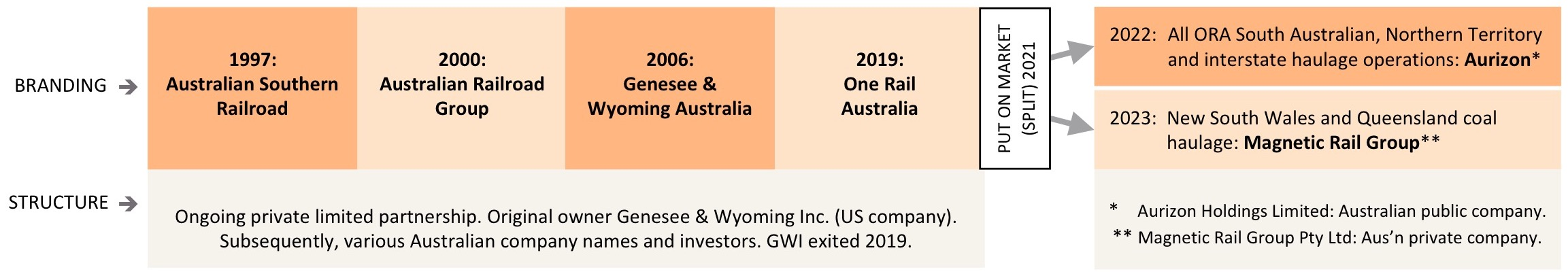
Click to enlarge

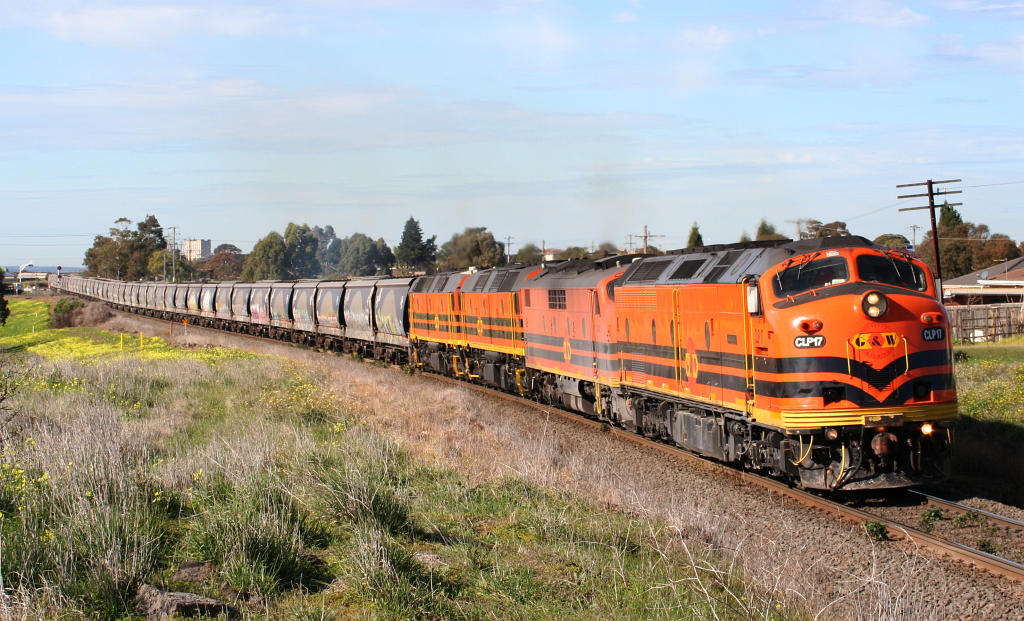
A standard-gauge train of Chicago Freight Car Leasing Australia grain hopper cars near Geelong in 2007, hauled by GWA's CL, GM and 2200 class locomotives

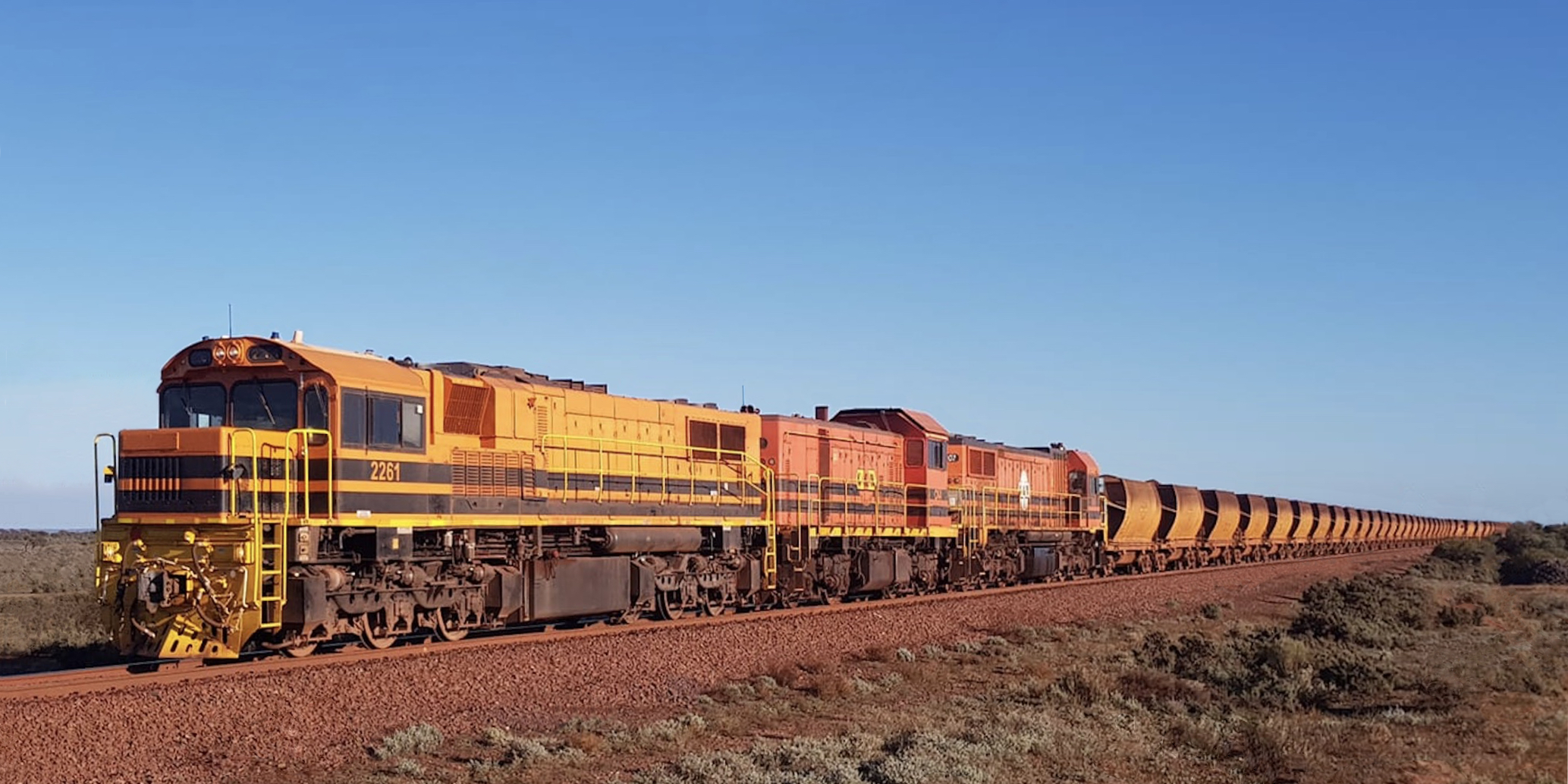
A narrow-gauge iron ore train on the heavy-haul line between the Middleback Range and Whyalla, South Australia

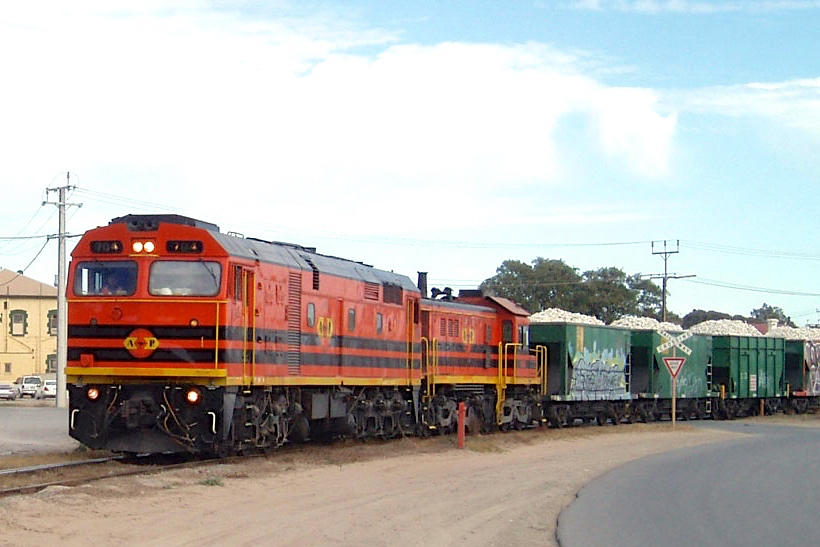
GWA operated the broad-gauge train between Penrice limestone quarry and the Adelaide outer suburb of Osborne until 2014, when the soda ash factory closed

Genesee & Wyoming Inc was one of several US regional railroad companies to take advantage of the privatisation of Australian rail freight operations in the 1990s. In 1997 its Australian subsidiary (named Australian Southern Railroad at the time) acquired the South Australian rail freight assets of Australian National from the Australian federal government, which included a 50-year lease on the South Australian network from the state government. Operations commenced in November 1997 under the Australian Southern Railroad brand.

In 2000, Australian Railroad Group, a 50–50 joint venture between Genesee & Wyoming and Wesfarmers, took over the Westrail freight business in Western Australia and branded it as Australian Western Railroad. As part of the joint venture agreement, ownership of Australian Southern Railroad passed to the Australian Railroad Group. In 2002, Australian Southern Railroad, Australian Western Railroad and Australian National Railways were brought together as the Australian Railroad Group.

In 2006, Australian Railroad Group sold its Western Australian operations to Queensland Rail and WestNet Rail. Simultaneously, Wesfarmers sold its 50% interest in the remainder of Australian Railroad Group to Genesee & Wyoming Inc, and the business was rebranded Genesee & Wyoming Australia (GWA).

In 2010, GWA purchased the assets of FreightLink from that company's receivers and took over its operations. As a consequence, under a build–own–operate–and–transfer ("BOOT") agreement it became the lessor of the Alice Springs to Darwin section of the Adelaide–Darwin rail corridor until 2054, when ownership was to pass to the Australian federal government. It also became the lessee (from the Australian Rail Track Corporation) of the Tarcoola to Alice Springs sector until 2047. After this acquisition, GWA became the largest of 11 regions around the world in which Genesee & Wyoming Inc operated.

After Freightliner Group was purchased by Genesee & Wyoming Inc in 2015, Freightliner's Australian operations were integrated with those of GWA.

By 2016, GWA had been operating Glencore Rail's assets with fellow Genesee & Wyoming Inc subsidiary Freightliner for some time under a 20-year contract. In conjunction with Macquarie Infrastructure & Real Assets, the company acquired Glencore's Hunter Valley business. Concurrently, Genesee & Wyoming Inc acquired a 49% equity stake in GWA.

In 2019, when the US parent Genesee & Wyoming Inc was sold to Brookfield Infrastructure Partners and GIC Private Limited, GWA was not included. Because Brookfield already had other rail assets in Australia that could well have led to the companies regulator, the Australian Competition and Consumer Commission (ACCC), to block the purchase, the 51% shareholding that Genesee & Wyoming Inc had in GWA was sold separately to PGGM. On departure of its US parent, the company was rebranded as One Rail Australia.

== Sale ==
In October 2021, Aurizon agreed on terms to purchase One Rail Australia. To ameliorate an expected concern of the ACCC about dilution of competition in the Hunter Valley and Queensland coal haulage market, in which the company already operated, Aurizon made a court-enforceable undertaking to divest the coal haulage part of its business. The ACCC did not oppose the company's sale, which took effect on 29 July 2022. (Note: The parties were Aurizon Holdings Ltd (the acquirer) and various entities of Macquarie Asset Management (MAM), on behalf of MAM's funds, and PGGM Infrastructure Fund, to acquire 100% of One Rail Australia Holdings LP (the target), the South Australian limited partnership that owned the One Rail Australia business.)

Assets assigned to be divested included 51 locomotives, 1468 freight vehicles, leases to four depots and offices, and two maintenance facilities. Assets acquired by Aurizon through ownership or leaseholding were 3700 kilometres (2300 miles) of track, 60 locomotives, 770 freight vehicles, five terminals, and six maintenance facilities. (Note: Difference between data shown on the One Rail Australia website on 15 July 2022 (before the sale) and 3 August, when data was for the divested business.) About 400 employees transferred.

At the time of the sale, the South Australian, Northern Territory and interstate haulage operations were carrying about 10 million tonnes annually. (Note: Difference between the 55 million tonnage shown on the One Rail Australia website on 15 July 2022 (before the sale) and 3 August, when the tonnage, of 45 million, was that of the divested business.) The divested part of the business conveyed 45 million tonnes of coal annually. Its disposal was arranged by a business unit operated separately from Aurizon, with an independent board and management and an ACCC-approved independent manager. Magnetic Rail Group purchased the assets in February 2023.

The sale price of the divested assets was AUD2.35 billion.

== Operational history ==
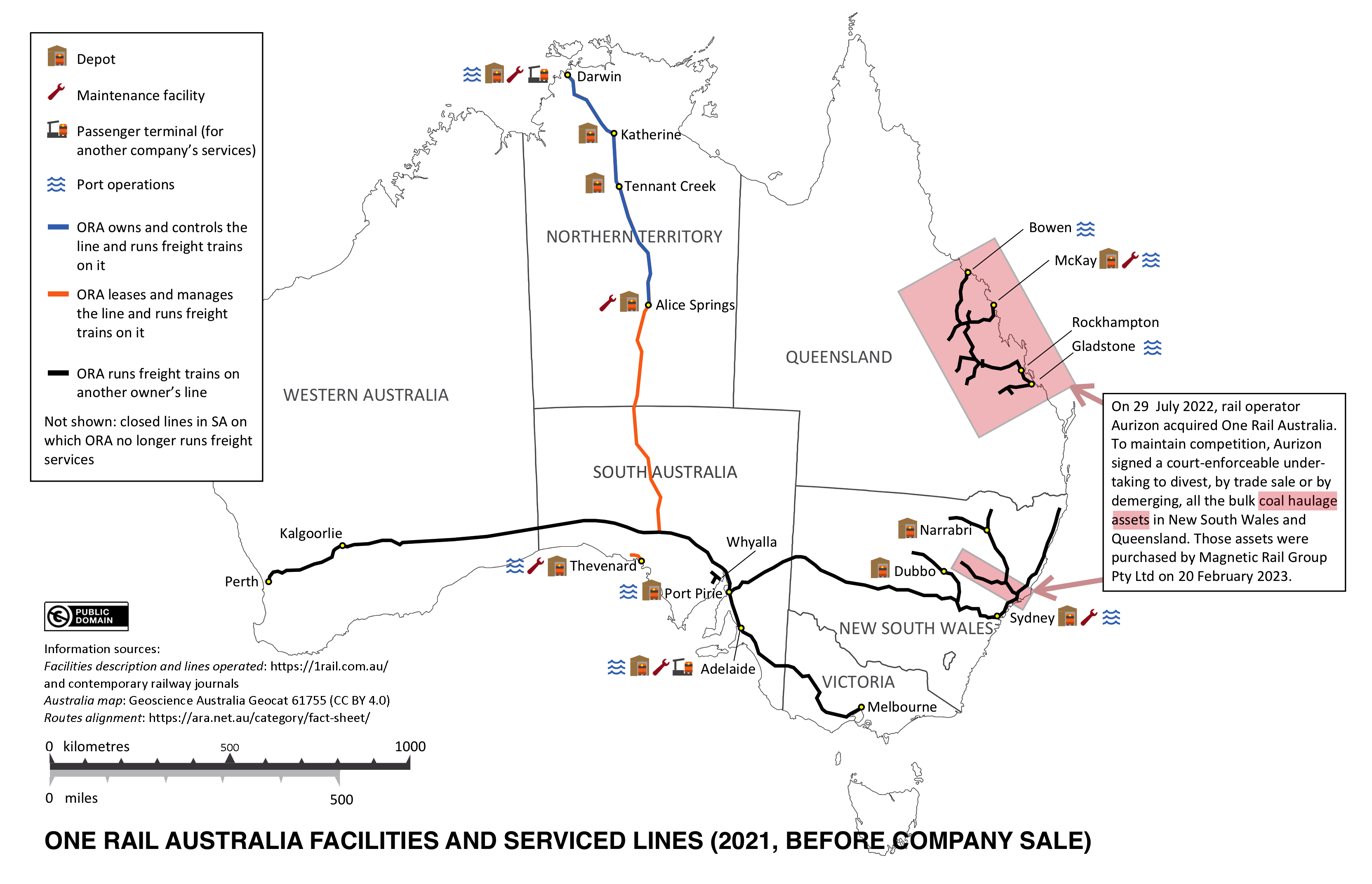
Before One Rail Australia was sold in July 2022, its operations spanned the entire Australian mainland. The purchaser, Aurizon, retained all assets other than those related to coal haulage in New South Wales and Queensland (pink areas), which were purchased by Magnetic Rail Group in February 2023. (Click to enlarge.)

In 1999, Australian Railroad Group started operating services from Adelaide to Melbourne for Patrick Corporation. In that year the company also contracted with Liberty House Group to operate iron ore trains on its line from Middleback Range to Whyalla.

In 2001, the company began operating services from Adelaide to Sydney via Broken Hill and Cootamundra. In 2003, it started operating within New South Wales when it was awarded a five-year contract to haul flour, grain and starch for the Manildra Group.

In 2004, when the Alice Springs to Darwin section of the Adelaide–Darwin rail corridor was completed, the company commenced operating intermodal train services between Adelaide and Darwin supported by freight and passenger facilities owned and operated at Alice Springs, Tennant Creek, Katherine and Darwin.

In 2008, as Genesee and Wyoming Australia, the company signed a five-year deal with ABB Grain to haul grain trains in Victoria.

In 2010, when the company purchased the lease of the Alice Springs to Darwin section of the Adelaide–Darwin rail corridor and leased the Tarcoola-to-Alice Springs section, it also undertook train control for both lines. (Note: The lease includes provisions for access by other rail operating companies.) As of 2019, the weekly traffic on the line (in each direction) was six inter-modal, long-distance freight trains and The Ghan, an experiential tourism train.

The company's market was expanded in 2020, when a coal hauling contract was started in Queensland.

== Lines operated and serviced ==
As of 2021, One Rail Australia leased 3700 km (2300 mi) of 1435 mm (4 ft 8 1/2 in) standard-gauge and 1067 mm (3 ft 6 in) narrow-gauge track. They were in two categories, since the company owned or leased some trackage and utilised some provided by other entities; three were narrow-gauge:

- lines leased by the company, on which it provided services (described as "above and below ground"):

– the 2248 km (1397 mi) standard-gauge Tarcoola–Darwin route
– the 65 km (40 mi) narrow-gauge gypsum line to Thevenard

- lines owned by other companies, on which One Rail Australia provided services (described as "above ground"):

– the federally owned interstate main lines from Kalgoorlie to Victoria and New South Wales
– main lines owned by state government authorities, of which the lines in Queensland were narrow-gauge
– the 112 km (70 mi) narrow-gauge iron ore lines to Whyalla owned by Liberty House Group.

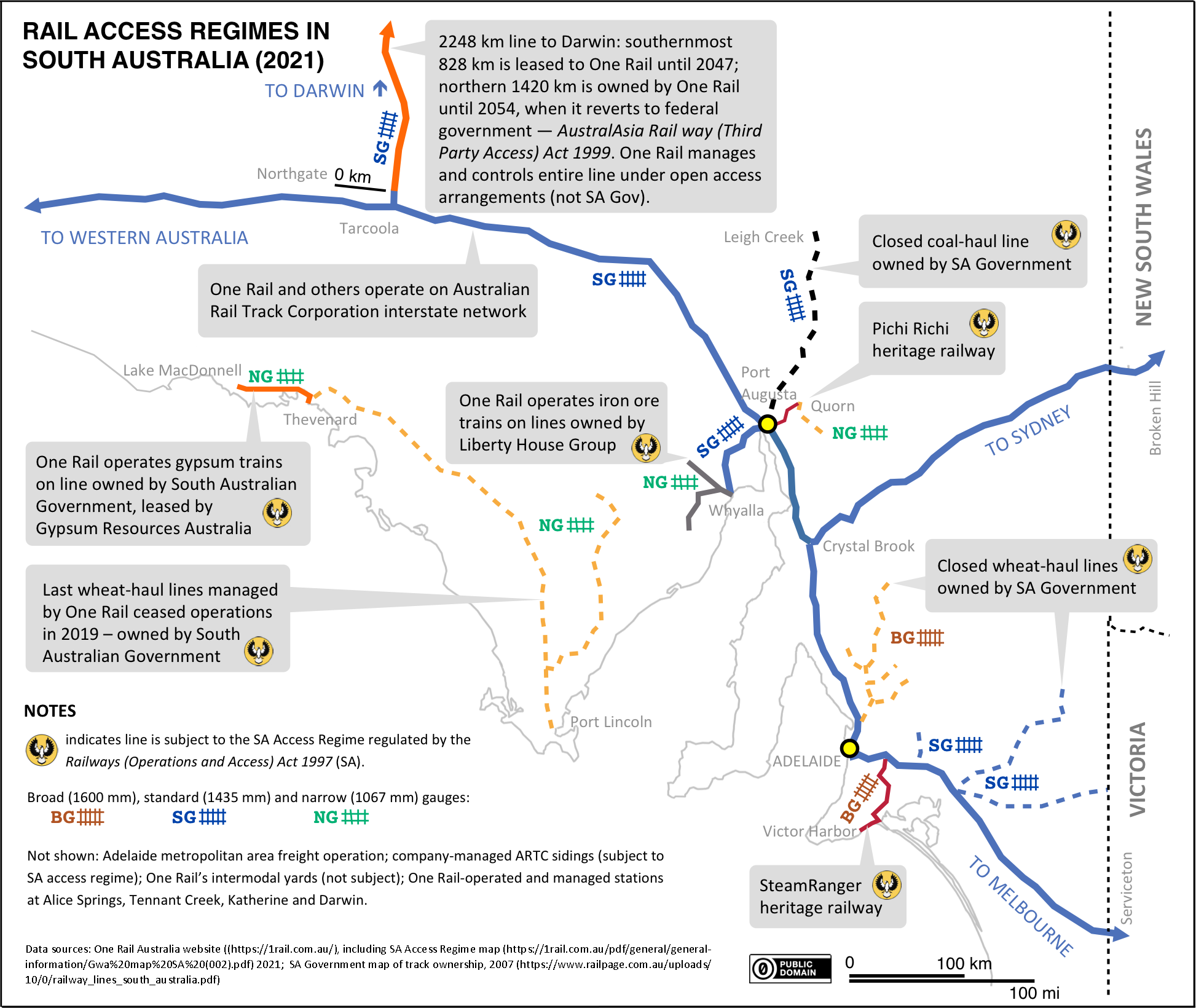
One Rail Australia commenced its operations in South Australia and the Northern Territory and on interstate routes under a variety of rail access arrangements involving leasing, ownership and operation of different lines. Aurizon inherited the arrangements on these lines when it purchased One Rail Australia in 2022. (Click to enlarge.)

The adjacent map summarises rail access arrangements for lines in South Australia and the Northern Territory, which formed the initial core of the company's operations. In South Australia, under a state government lease ending in 2047, the company operated and managed the non-metropolitan railway network except for routes to other states, and made it accessible to other companies. It also managed some yards and sidings attached to the ARTC main lines.

The South Australian open-access regime included lines serving grain silos in the Murraylands and on Eyre Peninsula: respectively 1058 kilometres (657 miles) of broad gauge and 814 kilometres (506 miles) of narrow gauge. Viterra, the monopoly grain handler in South Australia, progressively closed most silos served by the Murraylands lines, resulting in rail haulage ending in the period 2002–2015. Viterra also moved to road transport on the Eyre Peninsula in 2019, resulting in the peninsula network becoming dormant except for the gypsum haulage line from Lake MacDonnell to the port of Thevenard near Ceduna. The Murraylands and Eyre Peninsula networks were the last remnants of the lightly built lines that had been crucial in establishing agriculture in South Australia. (Note: When demand for services on a line has ceased and no new demand eventuates, the track is classified as discontinued and put into a dormant state on care and maintenance for a period of five years. During this period One Rail Australia is responsible for ongoing care, security and maintenance that includes maintaining the working order of all equipment, i.e. level crossings, signals, controls and switches so that a train can operate within 24 hours notice and will reinstate at its own cost if an access seeker negotiates to return a train to operation. The discontinued track is transferred back to the South Australian Government after five years if services do not return.)

== Locomotive fleet ==
As of November 2021, One Rail Australia's locomotive fleet totalled 132, including 16 in storage, of 24 different classes, as shown in the following table. (Note: Some change in the fleet size occurred between October 2019 and July 2022, immediately before the company's sale, when the One Rail Australia website nominated 113 locomotives.) The table also shows the 51 locomotives of the 2200, GWA, GWN, GWU and XRN classes that were included in the divested assets eventually purchased by Magnetic Rail Group in February 2023.

Class	Image	No. in use	No. stored	Gauge	Year built	Notes
500 class			1	Standard	1964	Ex Australian National, formerly South Australian Railways.
700 class			5 (Note: In 2022, after this list was published, One Rail Australia took action to dispose of the remaining 700 class locomotives: selling 701, donating 703, 704 and 705 to railway heritage organisations; and disposing components of 706. Details are here.)	Standard	1971	Ex Australian National, formerly South Australian Railways.
830 class		2	3	Standard	1960– 1966	Ex Australian National, formerly South Australian Railways.
900 class		3	4	Standard	1960– 1966	Rebuilt from 830 and 48 class locomotives.
1200 class		2		Narrow	1960– 1967	Ex Australian Railroad Group, ex Westrail, formerly Western Australian Government Railways A class.
1300 class		4		Narrow	1956– 1961	Ex BHP Whyalla DE class.
1600 class		3		Narrow	1971	Ex Australian National, formerly Commonwealth Railways NJ class.
1900 class		1		Narrow	1972	Ex Australian Railroad Group, ex Westrail, formerly Western Australian Government Railways D class.
2200 class		5		Standard	1969– 1970	Ex FreightCorp, ex State Rail Authority, formerly Public Transport Commission 422 class. In the sale of One Rail Australia assets in 2022, locomotive no. 2216 was one of the assets to be divested, on account of competition factors, from those purchased by Aurizon; in February 2023 it was part of those assets when purchased by Magnetic Rail Group.
2250 class		5		Narrow	1971	Repatriated from South Africa, ex Aurizon, ex Queensland Railways 2250 class.
ALF class		7		Standard	1976– 1977	Ex Australian National, formerly Commonwealth Railways AL class.
CK class		4		Narrow	1967– 1968	Ex V/Line, formerly Victorian Railways T class.
CLF class		2		Standard	1970– 1972	Ex Australian National, formerly Commonwealth Railways CL class.
CLP class		4		Standard	1970– 1972	Ex Australian National, formerly Commonwealth Railways.
FJ class		2		Standard	1966	Ex FreightLink ex Western Australian Government Railways J class.
FQ class		4		Standard	2003	Ex FreightLink.
G class		2		Standard	1988	Ex Freightliner, ex SCT Logistics, ex Pacific National, ex Freight Australia ex V/Line G class.
GM class		4	5	Standard	1965– 1967	Ex Australian National, formerly Commonwealth Railways.
GWA class		10		Standard	2011– 2012	In the sale of One Rail Australia assets in 2022, 4 locomotives of this class were among the assets to be divested, on account of competition factors, from those purchased by Aurizon; in February 2023 they were part of those assets when purchased by Magnetic Rail Group.
GWB class		3		Standard	2019	
GWN class		5		Narrow	2012	Transferred from Whyalla to Queensland. In the sale of One Rail Australia assets in 2022, 5 locomotives of this class (nos GWN 001 to GWN 005) were among the assets to be divested, on account of competition factors, from those purchased by Aurizon; in February 2023 they were part of those assets when purchased by Magnetic Rail Group.
GWU class		11		Standard	2012– 2021	In the sale of One Rail Australia assets in 2022, 11 locomotives of this class (nos GWU 001 to GWU 011) were among the assets to be divested, on account of competition factors, from those purchased by Aurizon; in February 2023 they were part of those assets when purchased by Magnetic Rail Group.
XRN class		30		Standard	2010- 2012	Previously owned by Glencore, built for Xstrata. In the sale of One Rail Australia assets in 2022, all locomotives of this class were among the assets to be divested, on account of competition factors, from those purchased by Aurizon; in February 2023 they were part of those assets when purchased by Magnetic Rail Group.
V class		1		Standard	2002	Purchased from Pacific National in early 2021.
