= Magnetic Rail Group =

Australian rail freight company

Magnetic Rail Group Pty Ltd
- Type: Australian proprietary company, limited by shares
- Industry: Bulk coal haulage by rail
- Predecessor: One Rail Australia
- Founded: 1 November 2022; 3 years ago
- Headquarters: Brisbane, Australia
- Area served: New South Wales and Queensland
- Number of employees: About 400 (2022)
- Parent: M Infrastructure Group (50%); PT Asian Bulk Logistics) (50%)

Magnetic Rail Group Pty Ltd is an Australian rail freight company that hauls bulk coal in New South Wales and Queensland. It was incorporated on 1 November 2022 as an Australian proprietary company, limited by shares. The company was formed as the corporate vehicle by which Magnetic Infrastructure Group Pty Ltd, an Australian incorporated 50‍–‍50 joint venture ultimately owned by M Infrastructure Group Pty Ltd and PT Asian Bulk Logistics, would manage the former One Rail Australia coal haulage assets that it was in the process of acquiring. One Rail Australia had hauled about 30 per cent of Hunter Valley export coal volumes and since 2020 had expanded its operations into Queensland.

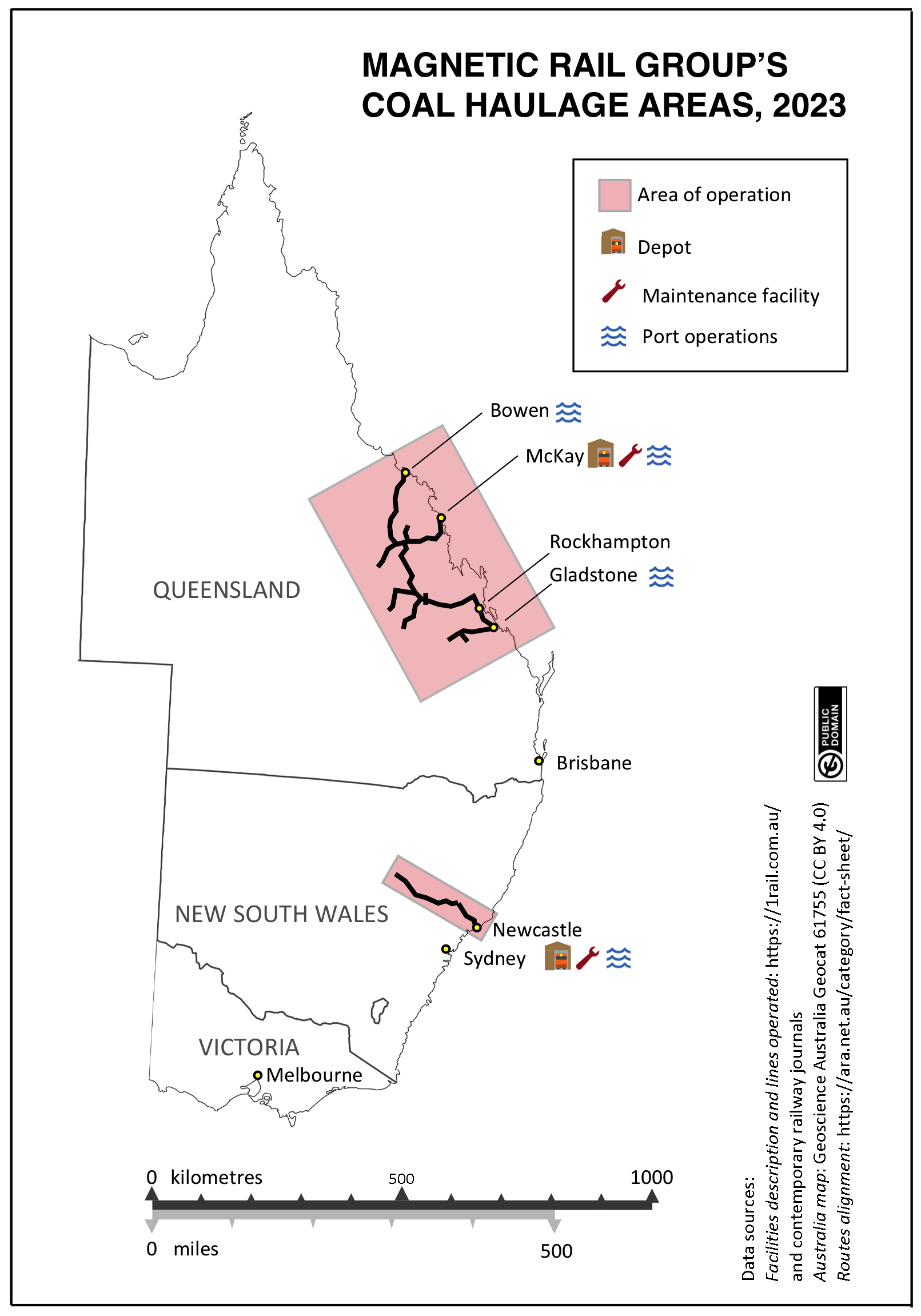
The areas of Magnetic Rail Group's coal haulage operations

In 2021, One Rail Australia agreed the terms of its purchase by rail freight operator Aurizon. Since the latter company was already a major operator in the Hunter Valley and Queensland coal haulage market, its acquisition of those assets had the potential to dilute competition. Consequently, Aurizon pledged a court-enforceable undertaking to divest the coal haulage assets of the business via trade sale or demerger. After the sale was completed on 29 July 2022, a business unit operated by NHK Pty Ltd, a wholly owned subsidiary of Aurizon, was established behind an ethics wall to administer the divestment through an independent board of management and an independent manager approved by the ACCC. Magnetic Rail Group Pty Ltd was selected as the purchaser and the sale was completed on 17 February 2023.

The sale price of the divested assets was AUD2.35 billion (USD1.6 billion), of which AUD125 million (USD85 million) was to be deferred for 12 months.

The sale price was described as representing a significant discount on the AUD1.16 billion (USD780 million) paid by Genesee & Wyoming Australia and Macquarie Infrastructure Corporation in 2016 for the former Glencore rail business, which still forms the bulk of the acquired assets.

Aurizon was to receive cash proceeds from Magnetic Rail Group of the equity value of approximately AUD425 million (USD290 million) after expected completion adjustments. Magnetic Rail Group would also assume the divested business's existing debt facilities, which originally totalled $500 million.

In December 2022, when the purchase was under negotiation, the International Railway Journal observed, "Magnetic Rail is not known to have any experience in rail so it remains to be seen whether it will become an operator in its own right, relying on existing ... management and staff, or whether it will contract out operations to an established freight operator."

== Fleet ==
Magnetic Rail Group commenced operations with a fleet of 51 locomotives and 1468 items of rolling stock acquired from One Rail Australia. Details of the locomotives, as of July 2022, were as follows.

Class	Image	No. in use	Gauge	Year built	Road numbers
2200 class		1	Standard	1969	2216
GWN class		5	Narrow	2012	GWN001 to GWN005
GWU class		11	Standard	2012 to 2020	GWU001 to GWU011
XRN class		30	Standard	2010 to 2012	XRN001 to XRN030
ORN class		4	Narrow	2022	ORN001 to ORN004
