= Genesee & Wyoming =

American railroad holding company

Genesee & Wyoming Inc.
- Type: Private
- Industry: Short line and regional railroad freight
- Founded: 1977; 49 years ago in Rochester, New York, U.S.
- Founder: Edward Laton Fuller
- Headquarters: Darien, Connecticut, U.S.
- Area served: United States, Canada, Bolivia, Netherlands, United Kingdom, Poland, Germany, Belgium, Australia (former)
- Key people: Michael O. Miller, CEO
- Services: Transportation, logistics
- Revenue: ▲US$2.719 billion (2019)
- Net income: ▼US$261.0 million
- Number of employees: 7,300
- Parent: Brookfield Infrastructure Partners; GIC Private Limited
- Website: www.gwrr.com

Genesee & Wyoming Inc. (G&W) is an American short line railroad holding company, that owns or maintains an interest in 122 railroads and railways in the United States, Canada, Belgium, the Netherlands, Poland, Bolivia and the United Kingdom; and formerly in Australia.

The company grew from the Class III Genesee and Wyoming Railroad, founded in 1899. As of 2011, it operates more than 13,000 miles (21,000 km) of owned and leased track. As of 2021, G&W owns or leases 116 freight railroads organized in locally managed operating regions with 7,300 employees serving 3,000 customers.

G&W's four North American regions serve 42 U.S. states and four Canadian provinces and include 113 short line and regional freight railroads with more than 13,000 track-miles. Its UK/Europe region includes the Freightliner Group, as well as regional rail services in continental Europe.

G&W subsidiaries and joint ventures also provide rail service at more than 30 major ports, rail-ferry service between the U.S. Southeast and Mexico, transload services, and industrial railcar switching and repair.

== History ==
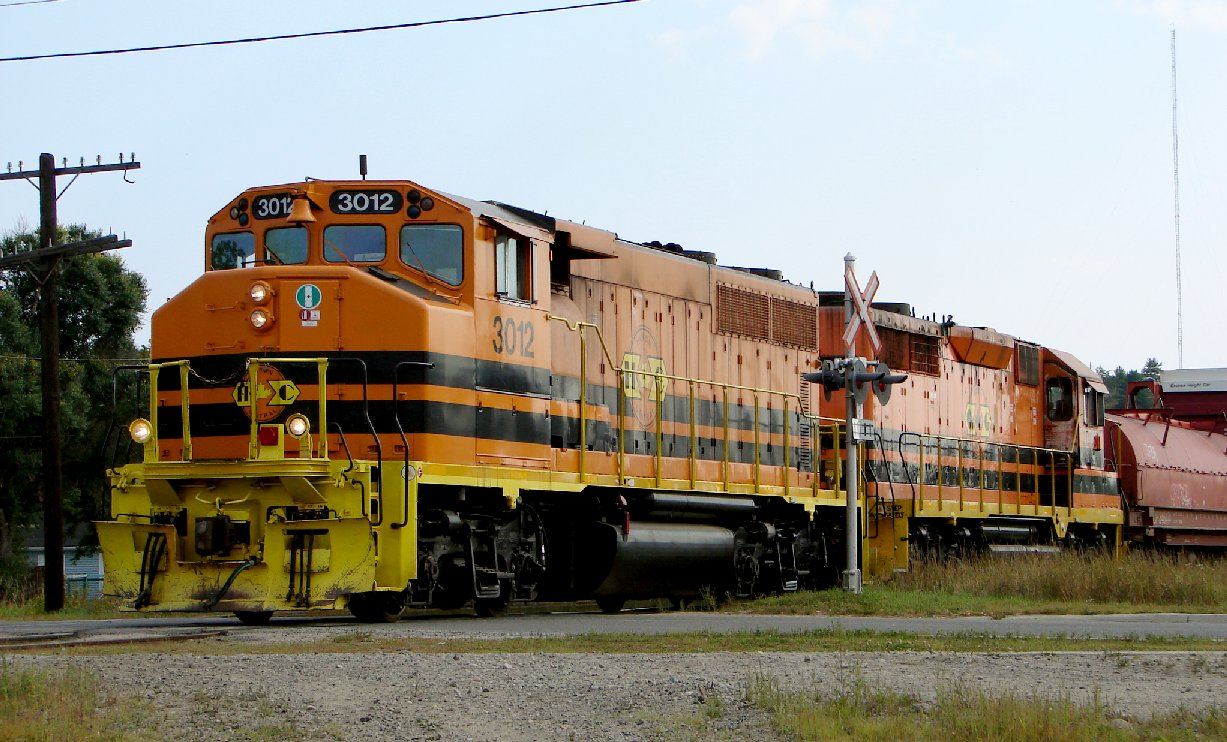
Huron Central Railway EMD GP40-2 in September 2009

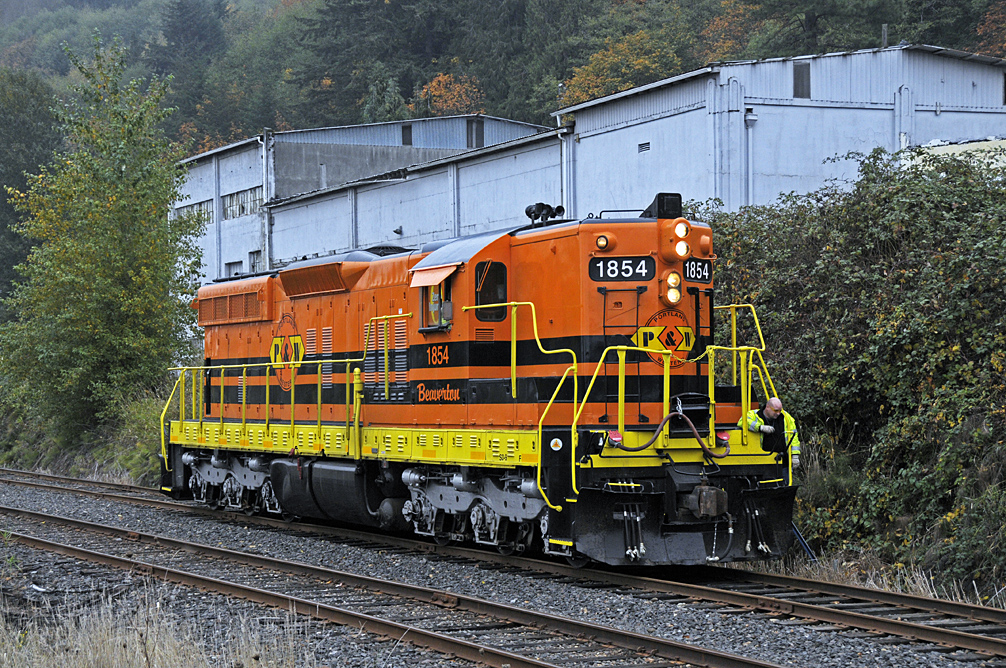
Portland & Western Railroad EMD SD9 in October 2009

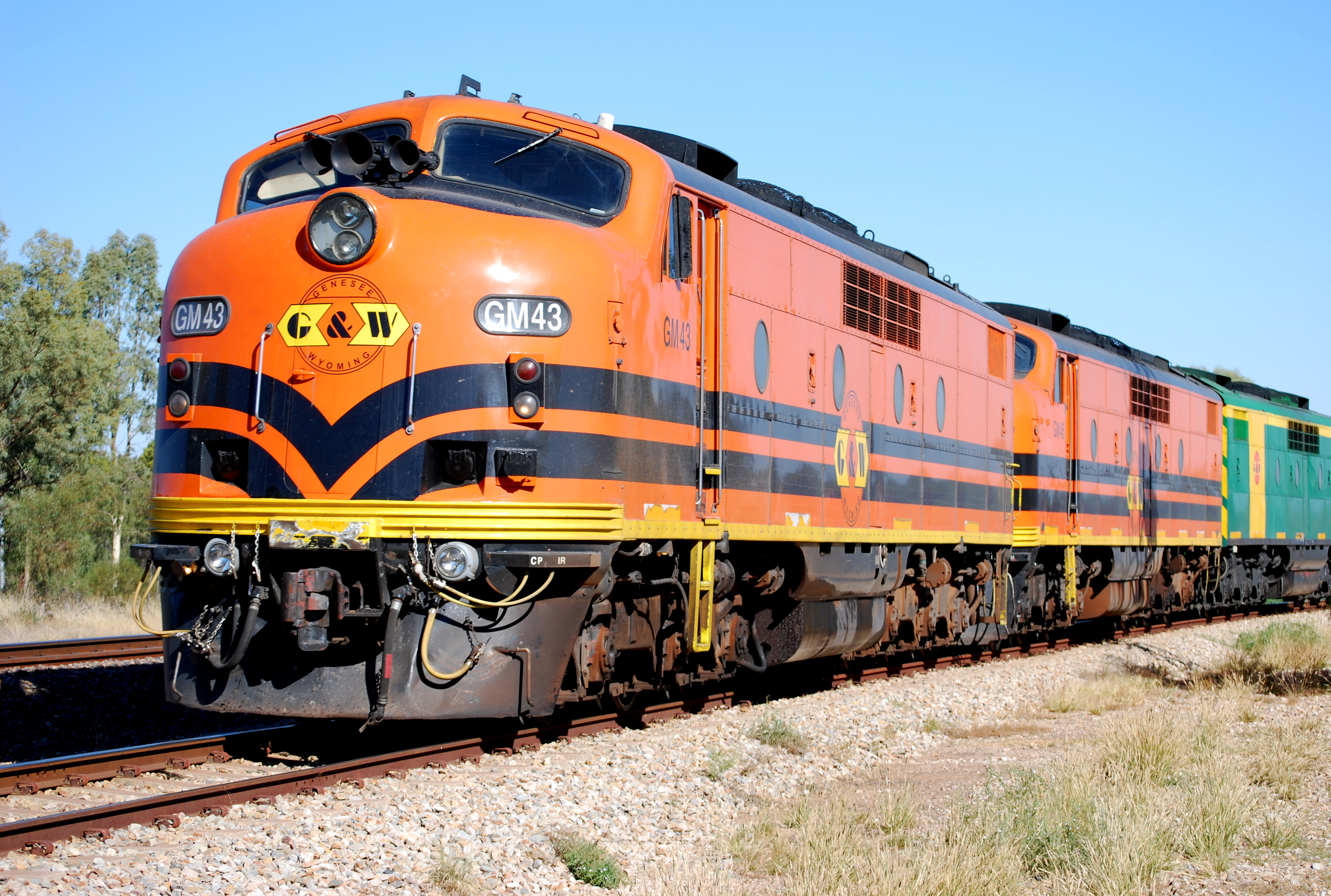
Genesee & Wyoming Australia GM class in April 2008

=== Early years ===
The Genesee and Wyoming Railroad was the flagship predecessor to the G&W; Edward L. Fuller purchased it out of a bankruptcy in 1899. At that time, the railroad was operating as a 14.5-mile-long (23.3 km) single-track line serving a single customer, a salt mine owned by Fuller in Retsof, New York. It was still operating the same line for the salt mine when Mortimer B. Fuller III, great-grandson of Edward L. Fuller, purchased the railroad in 1977. The holding company, Genesee & Wyoming Railroad Inc., was organized during the same year, and the railroad became its subsidiary.

With deregulation of the rail industry by the Staggers Rail Act of 1980, railroads began disposing of unprofitable routes. Genesee & Wyoming acquired several of these short line railroads, scattered across the United States, from 1985 to 1996. Its acquisitions began including railroads in other countries in 1997.

=== Continued expansion ===
In November 1997, Genesee & Wyoming purchased the South Australian freight operations of Australian National and rebranded the operation Australian Southern Railroad.

In October 2000, Australian Railroad Group, a 50/50 joint venture between Genesee & Wyoming and Wesfarmers, were the successful bidder for the Westrail freight business in Western Australia. As part of the joint venture agreement, ownership of Australian Southern Railroad passed to Australian Railroad Group.

In July 2003, the Carolina Coastal Railway, operated by G&W subsidiary Rail Link, Inc., was sold to Main Line Rail Management, Inc.

On May 26, 2005, G&W announced that it agreed to purchase the railroad operations of Rail Management Corporation (RMC). G&W paid US$243 million in cash and assume $1.7 million in company debt to gain control of 14 short line railroads from RMC across the southeastern United States, as of June 1, 2005.

As of the close of 2005, Genesee & Wyoming had 2,330 employees in North America. That year, Hurricane Stan wiped out several miles of Genesee & Wyoming track in Mexico. In 2006, the Mexican government agreed to pay 75 percent of the rebuilding costs, or $15 million, to reconstruct the track.

In June 2006, the Australian Railroad Group joint venture was broken up with the Western Australian above rail operation sold to QR National and the below rail infrastructure to Babcock & Brown in a US$974 million (A$1.55 billion) deal. At the same time Wesfarmers sold its 50% share in the South Australian operation back to Genesee & Wyoming Inc for $15 million (A$22 million). The operation was rebranded Genesee & Wyoming Australia.

Also in 2006, Genesee & Wyoming elected to write off most of the value of its Bolivian operation, on fears that the Bolivian government would soon nationalize privately held railroads there. Genesee & Wyoming remains an investor in Empresa Ferroviaria Oriental, S.A.

In June 2010, Genesee & Wyoming, through a subsidiary holding company, paid A$334 million to acquire the operational rights to and the leasehold of the Tarcoola to Darwin Railway from the Asia Pacific Transport Consortium, and the operational rolling stock of FreightLink. This 1,400 miles (2,300 km) rail line was the longest the company has leased.

On August 2, 2011, Genesee & Wyoming announced that it planned to purchase the Arizona Eastern Railway from Iowa Pacific Holdings for US$90.1 million, with the deal expected to be completed by the end of the year. The deal was closed on 1 September 2011.

On July 23, 2012, Genesee & Wyoming agreed to purchase RailAmerica (RA), the short-line railroad holding company controlled by Fortress Investment Group (FIG), for $1.39 billion to combine North America's two largest short-line and regional rail operators.

On February 24, 2015, Genesee & Wyoming announced that it has agreed to acquire approximately 95% of the shares of Freightliner Group.

On August 15, 2016, Genesee & Wyoming announced that intended to acquire the Providence & Worcester Railroad, which operates in Massachusetts, Rhode Island, Connecticut and New York, for $126 million. The deal was approved by Providence & Worcester shareholders in October, and the Surface Transportation Board approved the acquisition in December.

On February 7, 2017, Genesee & Wyoming announced that it had reached an agreement to purchase the Heart of Georgia Railroad, subject to regulatory approval.

In May 2017, Genesee & Wyoming completed the purchase of Pentalver Transport Limited, a British container transport and terminal operator.

In July 2019, affiliates of Brookfield Infrastructure Partners and GIC announced they had agreed terms to purchase Genesee & Wyoming for $8.4 billion. The deal was closed in December 2019. Because Brookfield already has other rail assets in Australia that would likely lead to objections from the Australian Competition & Consumer Commission, G&W's 51% shareholding in Genesee & Wyoming Australia was sold separately to PGMM and the business renamed to One Rail Australia.

=== Controversies ===
In January 2023, the G&W had got into a legal settlement with the Environmental Protection Agency (EPA) and the Department of Justice (DOJ) for violating the Clean Air Act (CAA), as a consequence, the G&W was ordered to retire 88 diesel locomotives from the rosters of their railroads, each of which were from the first generation and second generation, and paying a fine of $1,300,000 ($1,373,689 in 2025), coming to the conclusion that none of the locomotives on the "hit list" should be preserved, as they had to be "permanently destroyed".

In June 2023, a lawsuit was filed by the Brotherhood of Maintenance of Way Employes Division of the Teamsters (BMWED) against the G&W and its subsidiary, Railroad Engineering Services, for falsely firing 31 employees from the company. The case is currently ongoing.

== Subsidiaries and holdings ==
Genesee & Wyoming Inc. owns controlling interests in 122 freight railroads, either directly or through subsidiaries, which are organized into local operating regions. These subsidiaries include Rail Link, Inc. (1996), Genesee & Wyoming Canada, Inc. (1997), Emons Railroad Group (2002), CAGY Industries (2008), and Summit View, Inc. (2008). In 2005, G&W acquired the properties formerly owned by the Rail Management Corporation.

Rail Link, Inc. (reporting mark RLIX), provides industrial switching and related customer logistics services. Rail Link, headquartered in Jacksonville, Florida, serves industrial customers in 13 states and serves more than 30 U.S. ports.

In November, 2026 it was announced that the company's holdings would be split into three semi-independent entities, forming two new corporations to do so; Atlantic & Great Lakes Transportation and Canyon & Cascade Transportation. If approved, the change would go into effect in 2027.
