= New South Wales 422 class locomotive =

Class of 20 Australian diesel-electric locomotives

New South Wales 422 class
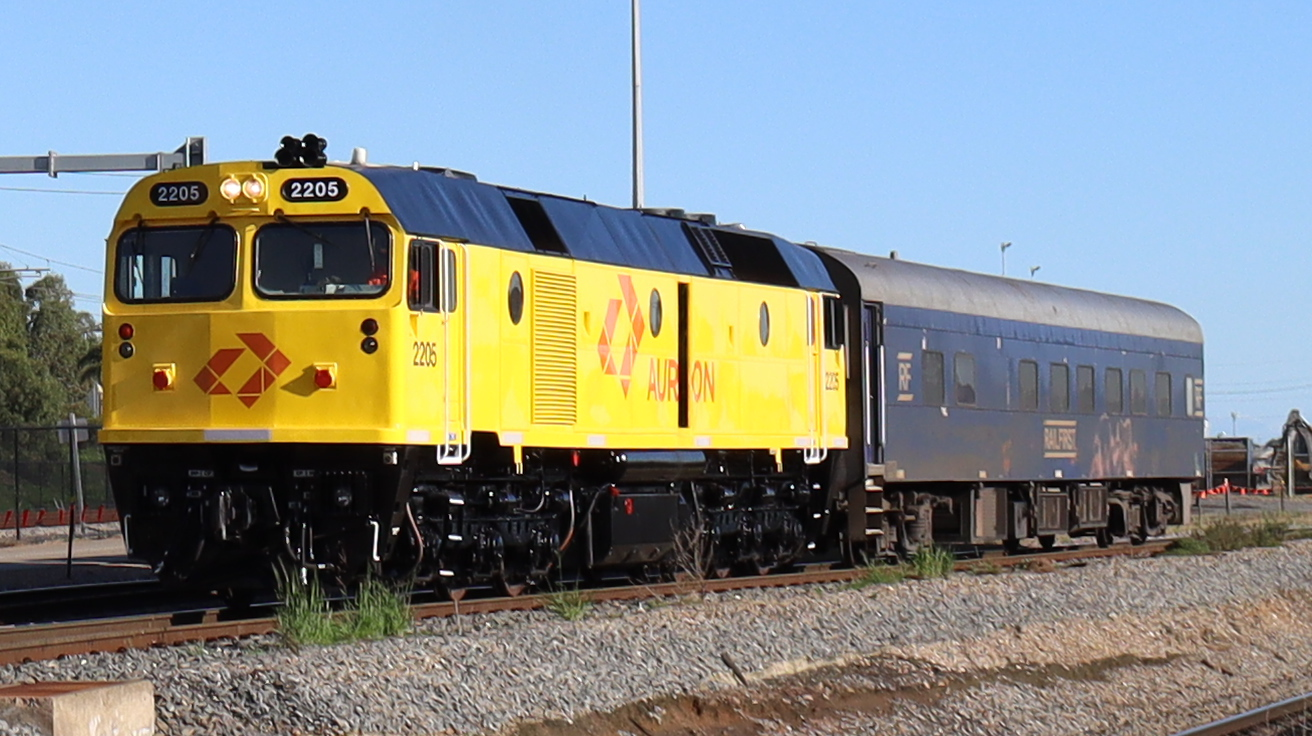
- Aurizon 2205
Type and origin
- Power type: Diesel-electric
- Builder: Clyde Engineering, Granville
- Serial number: 69-656 to 69-674, 70-675
- Model: EMD J26C (42220 rebuilt to J26C-2SS)
- Build date: 1969–1970
- Total produced: 20
Specifications
- Configuration
  - UIC: Co-Co
- Gauge: 1,435 mm (4 ft 8 1/2 in) standard gauge
- Wheel diameter: 40 in (1,016 mm)
- Length: Over headstocks: 56 ft 4 in (17.17 m); Over coupler pulling faces: 60 ft 6 in (18.44 m)
- Width: 9 ft 9 in (2.97 m)
- Height: 13 ft 11 in (4.24 m)
- Axle load: 18 long tons 0 cwt (40,300 lb or 18.3 t)
- Loco weight: 108 long tons 0 cwt (241,900 lb or 109.7 t)
- Fuel type: Diesel
- Fuel capacity: 1,200 imp gal (5,500 L; 1,400 US gal)
- Lubricant cap.: 166 imp gal (750 L; 199 US gal)
- Coolant cap.: 175 imp gal (800 L; 210 US gal)
- Sandbox cap.: 12 cu ft (0.34 m^{3})
- Prime mover: EMD 16-645E
- RPM range: 315–900
- Engine type: Two-stroke V16 diesel
- Aspiration: Roots blower
- Generator: EMD D32B-D14
- Traction motors: EMD D77B, 6 of
- Cylinders: 16
- Cylinder size: 9.0625 in × 10 in (230 mm × 254 mm)
- Transmission: Electric
- MU working: Equipped
- Train heating: No
- Loco brake: Air, Dynamic
- Train brakes: Air
- Safety systems: Deadman switch
Performance figures
- Maximum speed: 77 mph (124 km/h)
- Power output: 2,000 hp (1,490 kW)
- Tractive effort: Continuous: 70,920 lbf (315.47 kN) at 7.7 mph (12.4 km/h)
Career
- Operators: Magnetic Rail Group; Aurizon; Watco Australia; Southern Shorthaul Railroad
- Number in class: 20
- Numbers: 42201–42220
- Nicknames: Rattlesnakes
- Delivered: 1969
- First run: 10 January 1969
- Last run: 21 January 1970
- Current owner: Aurizon; Magnetic Rail Group; Watco Australia; Southern Shorthaul Railroad
- Disposition: 10 in service, 4 stored, 6 scrapped

The 422 class are a class of diesel locomotives built by Clyde Engineering, Granville for the Department of Railways New South Wales in 1969/70.

== History ==
The 422 class were the first Australian locomotives built with non-streamlined dual cab bodies. Manufactured by Clyde Engineering, Granville, they were introduced into service on the Main South and Illawarra lines where they would spend most of their New South Wales careers hauling passenger and freight services. Among the services they hauled were the Canberra Express, Intercapital Daylight, South Coast Daylight Express, Southern Aurora, Spirit of Progress, Griffith Express and Sydney/Melbourne Express.

In 1980, 42220 was rebuilt by Clyde Engineering, Rosewater, receiving an AR16 alternator, a new electrical system and Super Series wheel slip technology. It was a test bed for many of the features incorporated into the 81 class.

From 1982, they began to operate through to Melbourne. This ceased in February 1990 when non air-conditioned locomotives would no longer be accepted by Victorian drivers.

With the formation of National Rail, the 422s were all allocated to the new interstate carrier in July 1995 pending delivery of its NR class locomotives. This saw them again frequently operating to Melbourne, albeit usually as second units and over new territory to Parkes via Forbes and from August 1996 via the North Coast line to Brisbane. When they were returned to FreightCorp in September 1997, their Southern duties were now being handled by Class 81s so most were stored.

In 1999, 42202 and 42206 were sold to FreightCorp's North Coast sub-contractor, Northern Rivers Railroad passing with the business to Aurizon in May 2002.

By January 2000, only 42203 and 42220 remained in service with FreightCorp; these having been fitted with air-conditioning. These were retained primarily to operate CountryLink services from Sydney to Griffith and from January 2000 over new ground on the Outback Express to Broken Hill. These were sold to Chicago Freight Car Leasing Australia in 2001 and later rebuilt as HL203 and FL220.

In May 2000, the other 16 were sold to the Australian Southern Railroad and transferred in one movement from Werris Creek where they had been stored to Dry Creek, Adelaide where they were gradually reactivated. Some were placed in service operating construction trains on the Alice Springs to Darwin line as well as in South Australia and Western Australia. Others returned to New South Wales on hire to other operators. It was decided to rebuild all 16 as the 22 class which among other modifications saw air-conditioning fitted, although only 14 ended up being completed at Downer Rail, Port Augusta.

With the splitting up of 10 passed to Aurizon in early 2023 and 1 to Magnetic Rail Group in early 2023.

== Status ==
In early 2023, 14 remained in service with Aurizon, SSR, watco, and Magnetic Rail with seven in store. In 2016 Watco Australia units and transferred to Perth to operate Brookfield Rail infrastructure trains.

As of November 2023 10 were owned by Aurizon, 2 by watco, 1 by Magnetic Rail Group & 1 by SSR.

In early 2023, 42202, 42206, and 2202 went to Cardiff for reactivation for Aurizon intermodal services. But 2202 has been road hauled to dry creek in June 2024 for reactivation.

Key:	In service	Stored	Preserved	Rebuilt	Under Overhaul	Scrapped

NSW No	Serial No	Entered service	Current/Last Owner	Current No	Name	Livery	Status	Notes
42201	69-656	10 Jan 1969	Aurizon	2205		Aurizon Canary	Reactivated at Forrestfield Yard, Currently at Dry Creek in SA	Coded 22 Class, Rumoured to be the Pimba Shunter
42202	69-657	4 Mar 1969	Aurizon	42202	Casino	Northern Rivers Railroad Blue/Orange/Yellow	Being Reactivated at Cardiff	Ex Northern Rivers Railroad
42203	69-658	27 Mar 1969	Watco Australia	HL203		Watco Black & Yellow	Operational	Ex Austrac & CFCLA
42204	69-659	23 Apr 1969	Aurizon	DC2206		Aurizon Pineapple	Scrapped at Casino, 2016	DC Class, Used on Manildra Grain
42205	69-660	7 May 1969	Apex Industrial	2201	Tennant Creek	ARG Orange & Black	Scrapped December 2015 Durban, South Africa	Used on Manildra Grain
42206	69-661	20 May 1969	Aurizon	42206		Northern Rivers Railroad Blue/Orange/Yellow	Operational	Ex NRR
42207	69-662	30 May 1969	Aurizon	2207		Aurizon SA Bulk Central	Operational	Alice Springs Shunter
42208	69-663	9 Jun 1969	Aurizon	DC2208		Aurizon Pineapple	Stored Forrestfield	DC Class
42209	69-664	23 Jun 1969	Aurizon	42209		FreightCorp Blue	Scrapped at Picton, July 2015	Trailing Status Only
42210	69-665	23 Jun 1969	Aurizon	2210		Aurizon SA Bulk Central	Operational	Dry Creek Shunter
42211	69-666	4 Aug 1969	Apex Industrial	42211		FreightCorp Blue	Scrapped December 2015 Durban, South Africa	Trailing Status Only
42212	69-667	18 Aug 1969	Aurizon	2212		Aurizon SA Bulk Central	Operational	Darwin Shunter
42213	69-668	5 Sep 1969	Aurizon	2202	Katherine	ARG Orange & Black	Road Hauled To Dry Creek June 2024 For Reactivation	Used On Darwin line
42214	69-669	24 Sep 1969	Apex Industrial	2203	Darwin	ARG Orange & Black	Scrapped December 2015 Durban, South Africa	Used On Darwin line
42215	69-670	10 Oct 1969	Aurizon	DC2213		Aurizon Pineapple	Stored Forrestfield	DC Class
42216	69-671	28 Oct 1969	Southern Shorthaul Railroad	42216	Alice	ARG Orange & Black	Stored Cootamundra	Included in sale of CLF1, CLF3, CLF4, CLP9, CLP12, ex 2204
42217	69-672	11 Nov 1969	Aurizon	2214		G&W Orange & Black with Aurizon logos	Operational	Port Pirie Shunter
42218	69-673	1 Dec 1969	Apex Industrial	DC2215		ARG Orange & Black (formerly wore 1988 Bicentennial livery)	Scrapped December 2015 Durban, South Africa	DC class
42219	69-674	16 Dec 1969	Magnetic Rail Group	2216		GWA Orange & Black	Operational	Shunter
42220	70-675	21 Jan 1970	Watco Australia	FL220		Watco Black & Yellow	Operational	Ex Austrac & CFCLA
