= Australian Railroad Group =

Railway operator in Western Australia

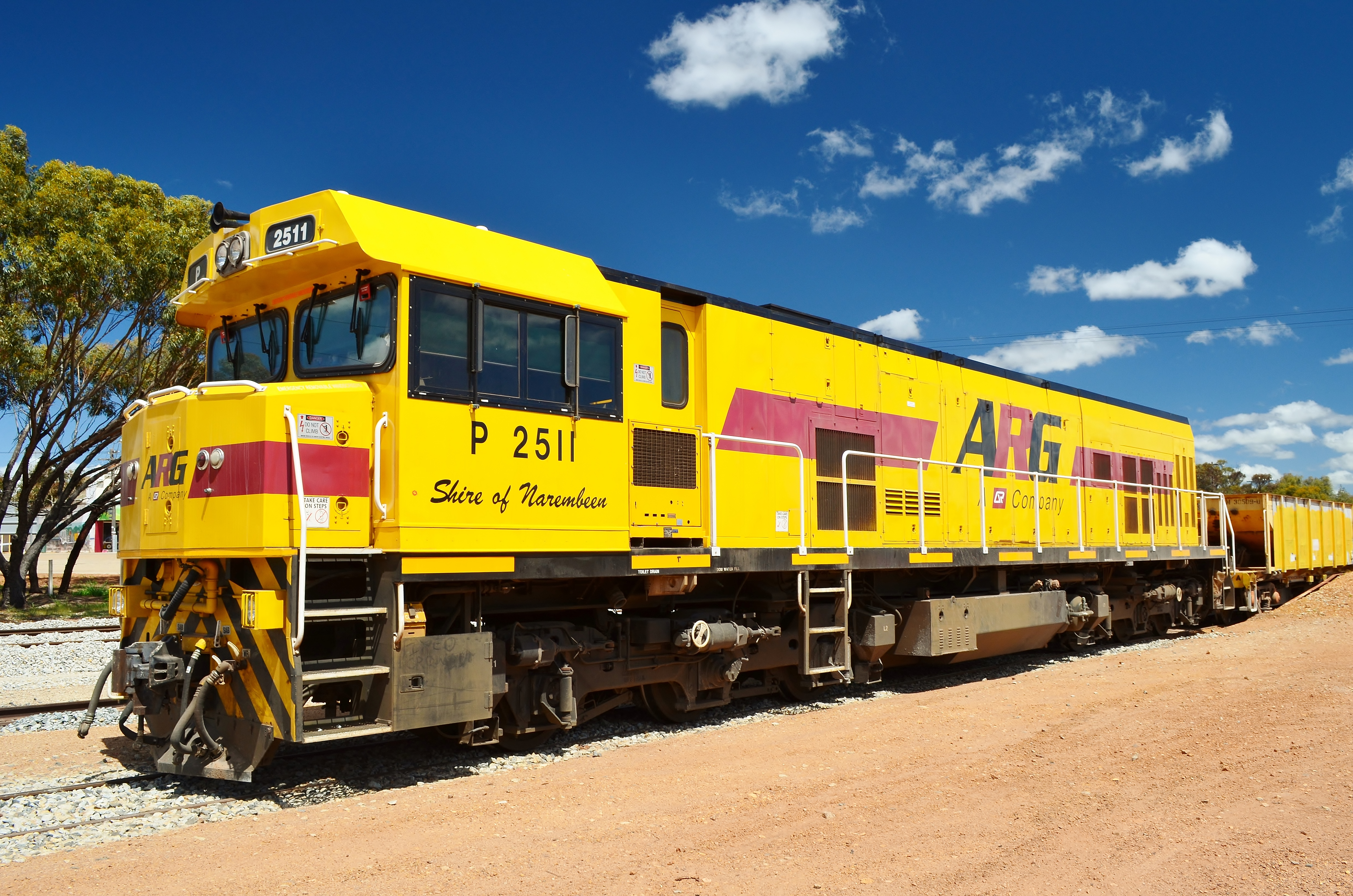
- P2511 in QR National ARG livery at Goomalling in October 2013
- Industry: Railway operator
- Founded: 17 December 2000
- Defunct: 30 June 2011
- Successor: QR National
- Area served: Western Australia
- Parent: Aurizon
- Website: www.arg.net.au

Australian Railroad Group (ARG) was an Australian rail freight operator. It began operations in Western Australia on 17 December 2000 following its purchase of the Westrail freight business. It was purchased by QR National in June 2006. The main commodities hauled by ARG included grain, mineral sands, alumina, bauxite, coal, woodchips, quartz, nickel and iron ore around Western Australia. In June 2011, it ceased trading as a separate brand, and became part of QR National.

== History ==
In 2000, the Australian Railroad Group was formed as a 50/50 joint venture between United States rail operator Genesee & Wyoming Inc and Australian rural services company Wesfarmers, to bid for the freight operator Westrail which was being sold by the Western Australian state government. Genesee & Wyoming already had an Australian presence, having purchased the South Australian freight operations of Australian National in November 1997 and rebranded the operation Australia Southern Railroad.

In October 2000, Australian Railroad Group were announced as the successful bidder for Westrail with operations commencing on 17 December 2000. Under the deal, 95 locomotives, 2,500 wagons, freight terminals and customer contracts were purchased with the infrastructure remaining in government ownership, and leased to ARG for 49 years.

As part of the deal, the joint venture assumed ownership of Genesee & Wyoming's South Australian operation, Australian Southern Railroad.

Initially, trains in Western Australia operated under the Australia Western Railroad name, with AWR logos being applied to locomotives in the orange, black and yellow of Genesee & Wyoming. With ARG's involvement with the Asia Pacific Transport Consortium building the Alice Springs to Darwin line, resulting in some locomotives operating construction trains on the line receiving Australia Northern Railroad logos, it was decided to rebrand all ANR, ASR and AWR operations under the Australian Railroad Group banner from August 2002.

In June 2006, the joint venture was dissolved with Wesfarmers selling its 50% share in the South Australian operations back to Genesee & Wyoming. The above rail operation in Western Australia was sold to QR National and the below the rail WestNet Rail infrastructure business to Babcock & Brown.

In June 2011, it ceased trading as a separate brand, and became part of QR National.

== Locomotive fleet ==
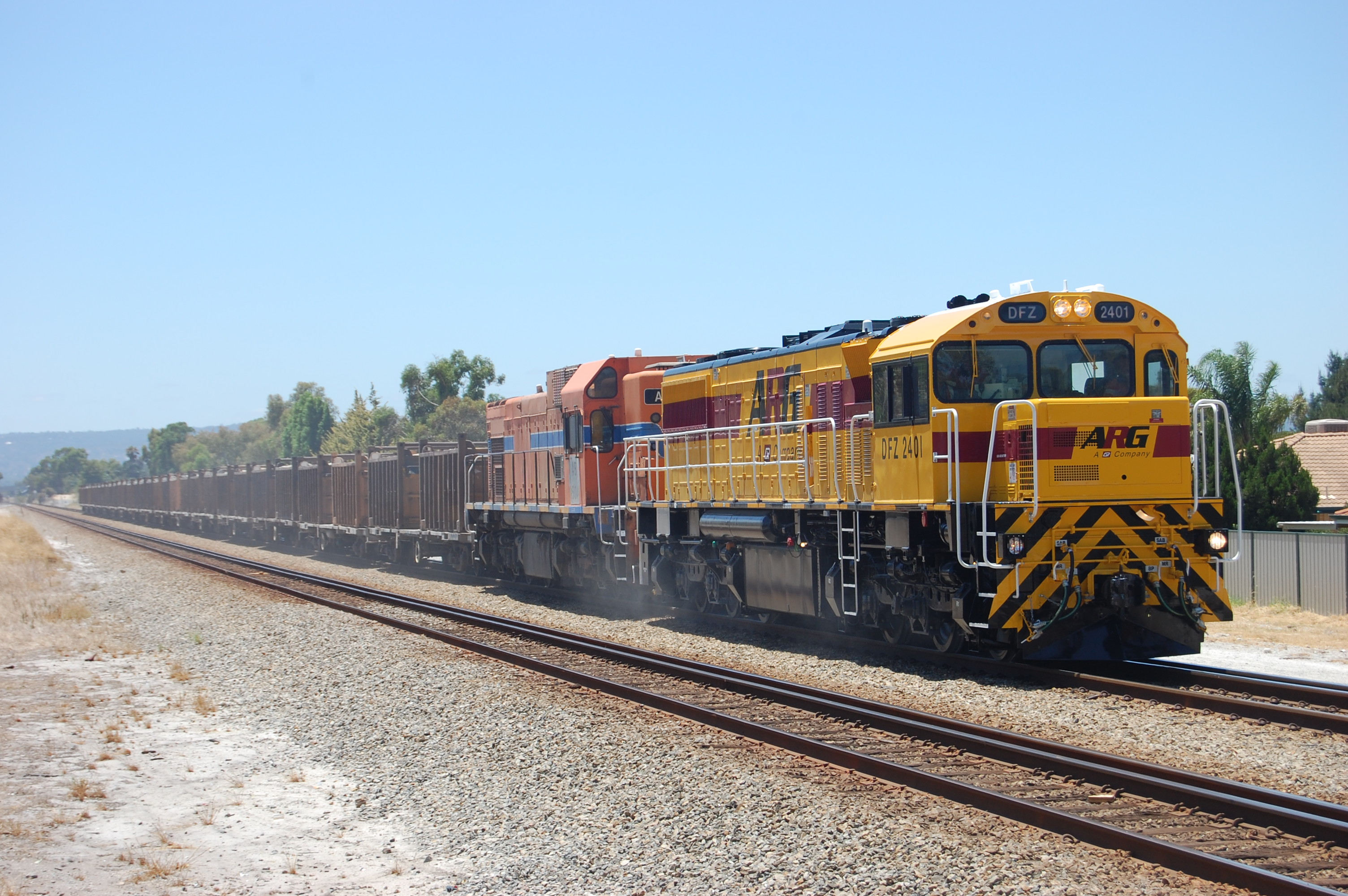
DFZ2401 leading AB1504 at Thornlie in September 2009

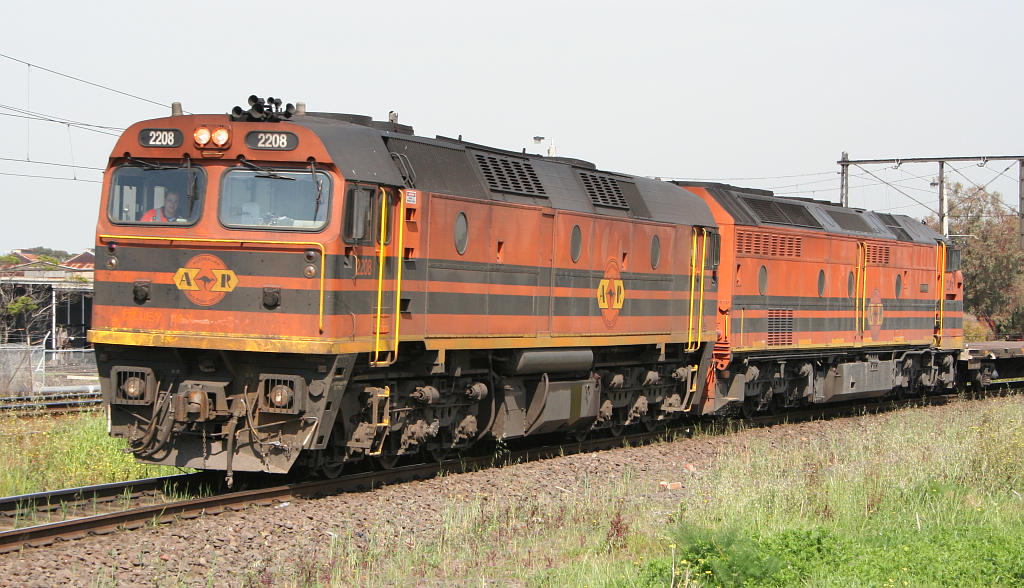
2208 leading a CL in Newport in September 2006

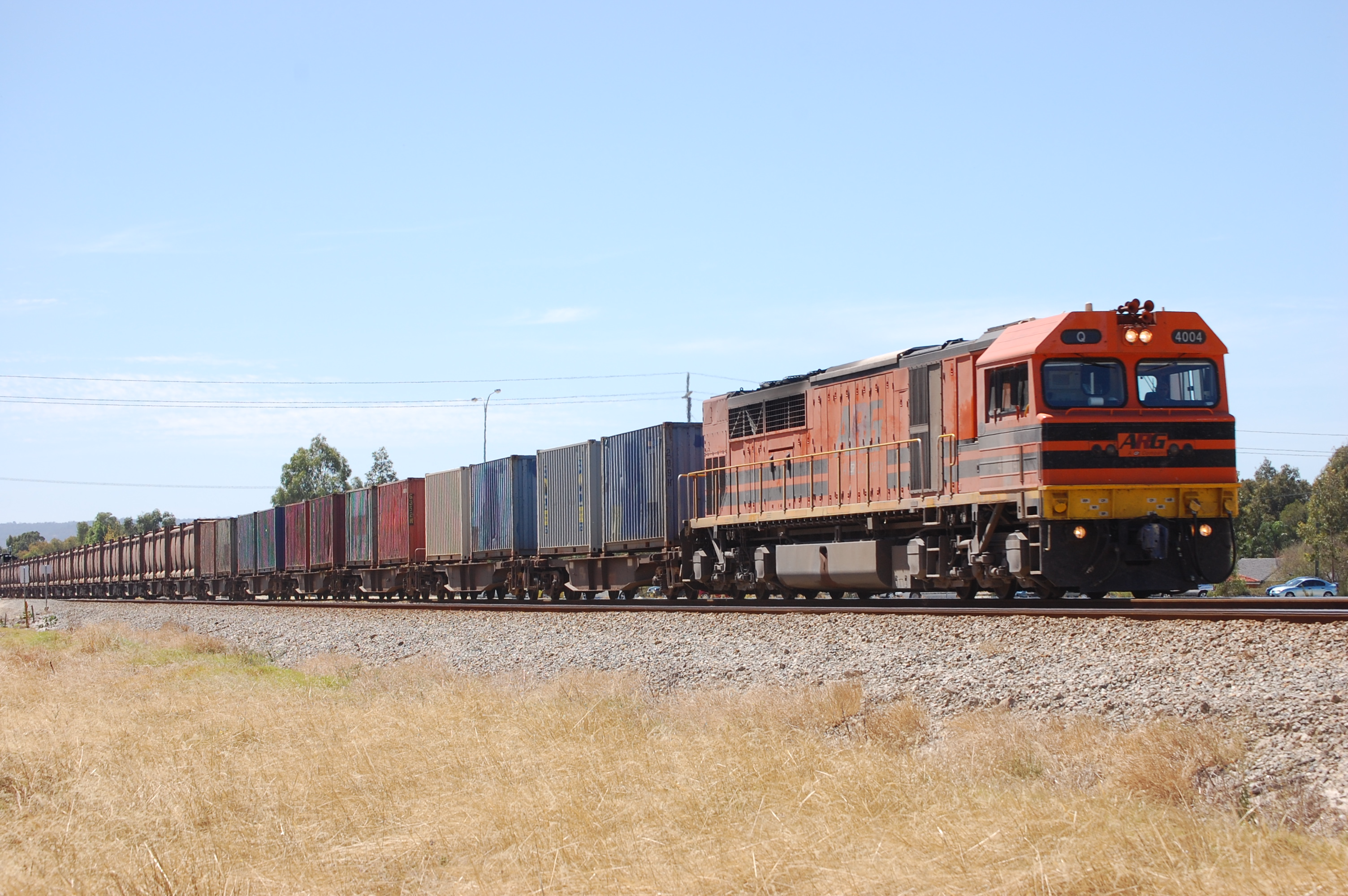
Q4004 in the original Genesee & Wyoming ARG livery with QR National at Kwinana in March 2009

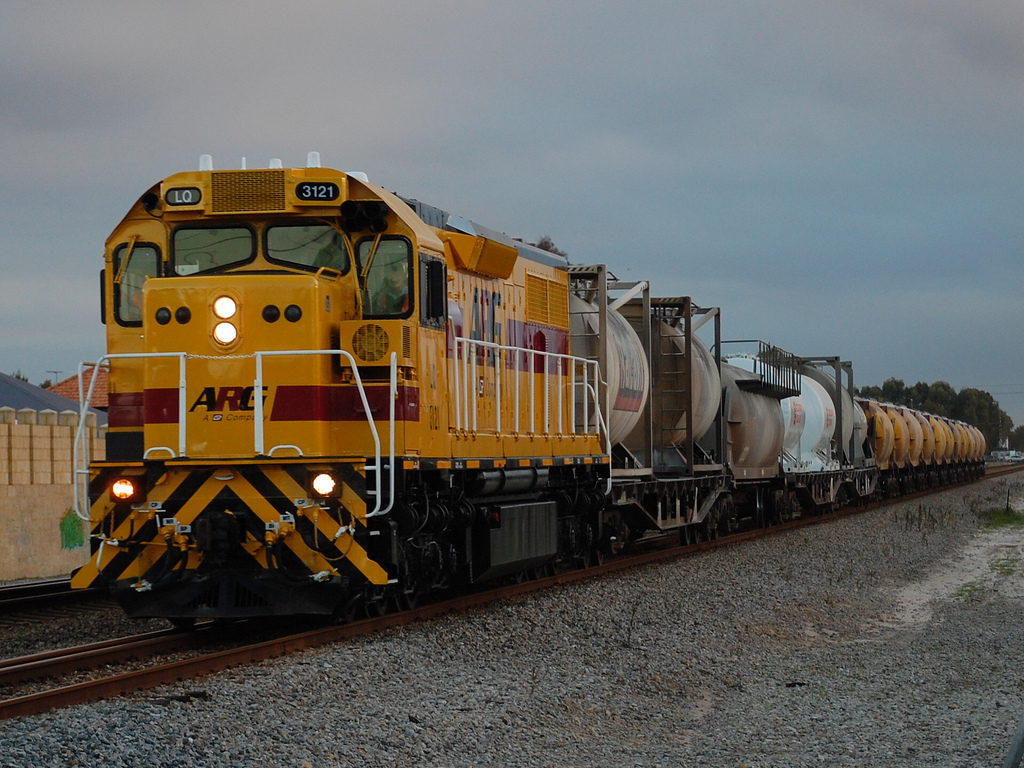
LQ3121 in QR National ARG livery passing through Thornlie in September 2009

With the introduction of the ARG name and corporate colours, ARG began a gradual process of standardising the locomotive classification based on horsepower, with a progressive (and still incomplete) renumbering. As of February 2006 new letter classes will be used in conjunction with the new horsepower based numbering system (The Z on the end of some class letters refers to locomotives fitted with ZTR).

- 700 class (ex SAR 700 class)
- 830 class (ex SAR 830 class)
- DA/900 class (ex AN DA class)
- CK/1000 class (ex AN CK class)
- A class (ex WAGR A class)
- DE/1300 class (ex BHP DE class)
- AB/1500 class (ex WAGR AB class)
- NJ/1600 class (ex CR NJ class)
- GM/1800 class (ex CR GM class)
- DA/DAZ/1900 class (ex WAGR DA class)
- DC/2200 class (ex NSWGR 422 class)
- DB/DBZ/2300 class (ex WAGR DB class)
- D/2350 class (ex WAGR D class)
- P/2500 class (ex WAGR P class)
- CL/CLZ/3000 class (ex AN CLF/CLP classes)
- L/LZ/3100 class (ex WAGR L class)
- ALF/3200 class (ex AN ALF class)
- S/3300 class (ex Westrail S class)
- Q/4000 class (ex Westrail Q class)
- AC/4300 class (new build UGL Rail C43aci)

== Western Australian facilities ==
- Forrestfield Yard, Forrestfield, suburban Perth
- Kwinana Yard, Kwinana
- Avon Yard, Northam
- West Merredin Yard, Merredin
- Picton Yard, Bunbury
- West Kalgoorlie Yard, Kalgoorlie
- Narngulu Yard, Narngulu, Geraldton
- Esperance Depot, Esperance
- Wagin Depot, Wagin
- Albany Depot, Albany
- Collie Depot, Collie
