= Commonwealth Railways CL class =

Australian diesel electric locomotive

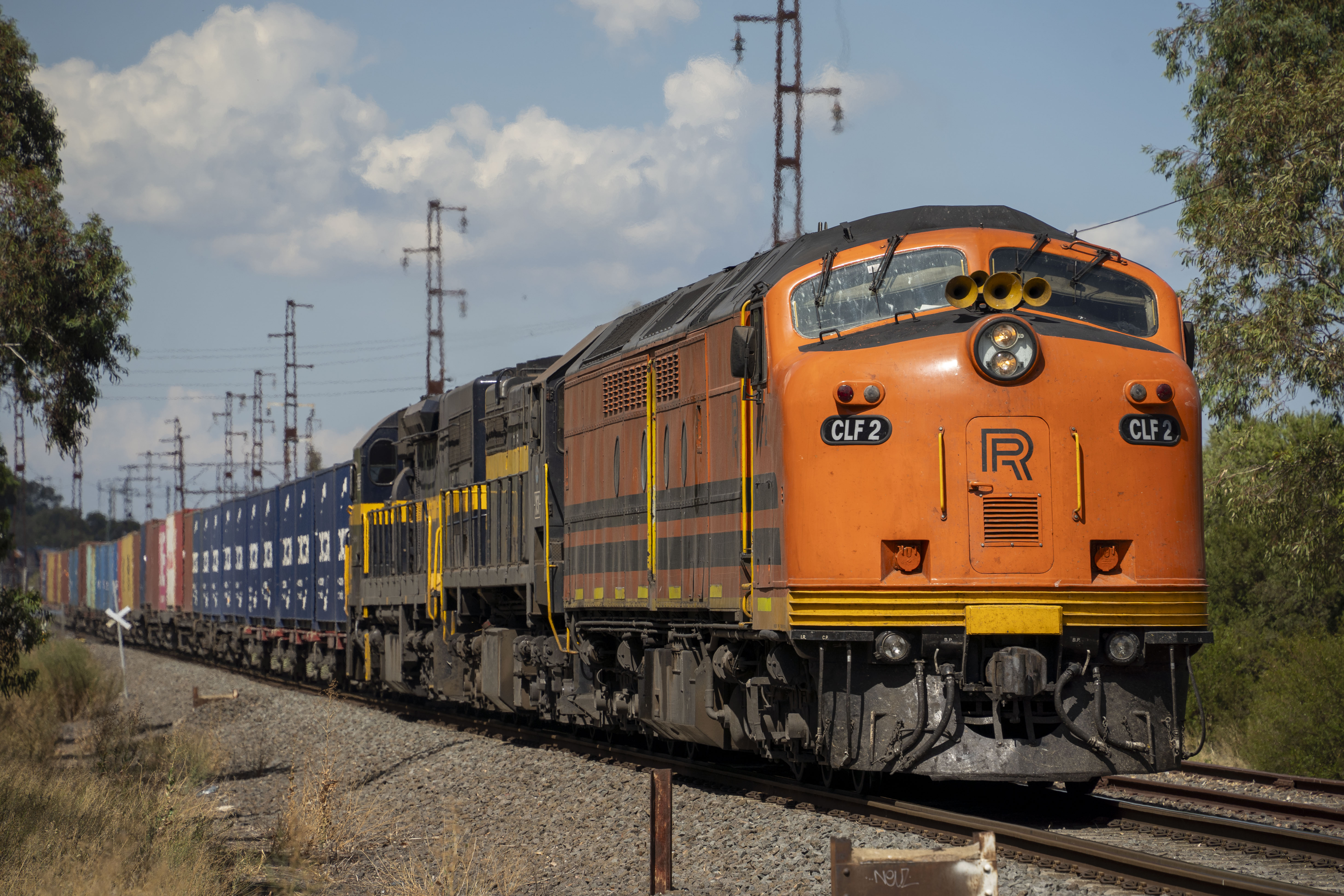
- Railpower CLF2 at Spotswood in March 2024
Type and origin
- Power type: Diesel-electric
- Builder: Clyde Engineering, Granville
- Model: AT26C (CL), AT26C-2M (CLF); AT26HC-2M (CLP)
- Build date: 1970-1972
- Total produced: 17
- Rebuilder: Morrison Knudsen Australia
- Rebuild date: 1993
- Number rebuilt: 17
Specifications
- Configuration
  - UIC: Co-Co
- Gauge: 1,435 mm (4 ft 8 1/2 in) standard gauge
- Bogies: Clyde Engineering Hi-Ad
- Wheel diameter: 1,016 mm (40.0 in)
- Length: 19.58 m (64 ft 3 in)
- Axle load: 21.5t (CL/CLF),
- Loco weight: 129t (CL/CLF) 131t (CLP)
- Fuel type: Diesel
- Fuel capacity: 10,230 L (2,250 imp gal; 2,700 US gal) (CL/CLF); 11,360 L (2,500 imp gal; 3,000 US gal) (CLP)
- Lubricant cap.: 870 L (190 imp gal; 230 US gal)
- Coolant cap.: 1,115 L (245 imp gal; 295 US gal)
- Sandbox cap.: 340 L (75 imp gal; 90 US gal)
- Prime mover: EMD 16-645E3 (CL); Electro-Motive Diesel 16-645E3C (CLF/CLP)
- RPM range: 315-900
- Engine type: Two-stroke V16 diesel
- Aspiration: Turbocharged
- Alternator: AR10A4
- Traction motors: EMD D77 (CL), EMD D78 (CLF/CLP)
- Cylinders: 16
Performance figures
- Maximum speed: 130 km/h (81 mph) (CL/CLF); 140 km/h (87 mph) (CLP)
- Power output: 2,237 kW (3,000 hp) (CL); 2,460 kW (3,300 hp) (CLF/CLP)
Career
- Operators: Aurizon; Southern Shorthaul Railroad; RailPower; Streamliners Australia
- Number in class: 17
- Numbers: CL1-CL17
- Delivered: January 1970
- First run: 9 February 1970
- Preserved: CL17 (CLP10)
- Current owner: Aurizon; Southern Shorthaul Railroad; RailPower; Streamliners Australia
- Disposition: 11 in service, 2 stored, 1 under repair, 1 preserved, 2 scrapped

The CL class is a class of diesel locomotives built by Clyde Engineering, Granville for the Commonwealth Railways in several batches between 1970 and 1972. The class was the last in the world to be built with the Electro-Motive Diesel bulldog nose but differed from previous builds in having a mansard roof.

== Construction ==
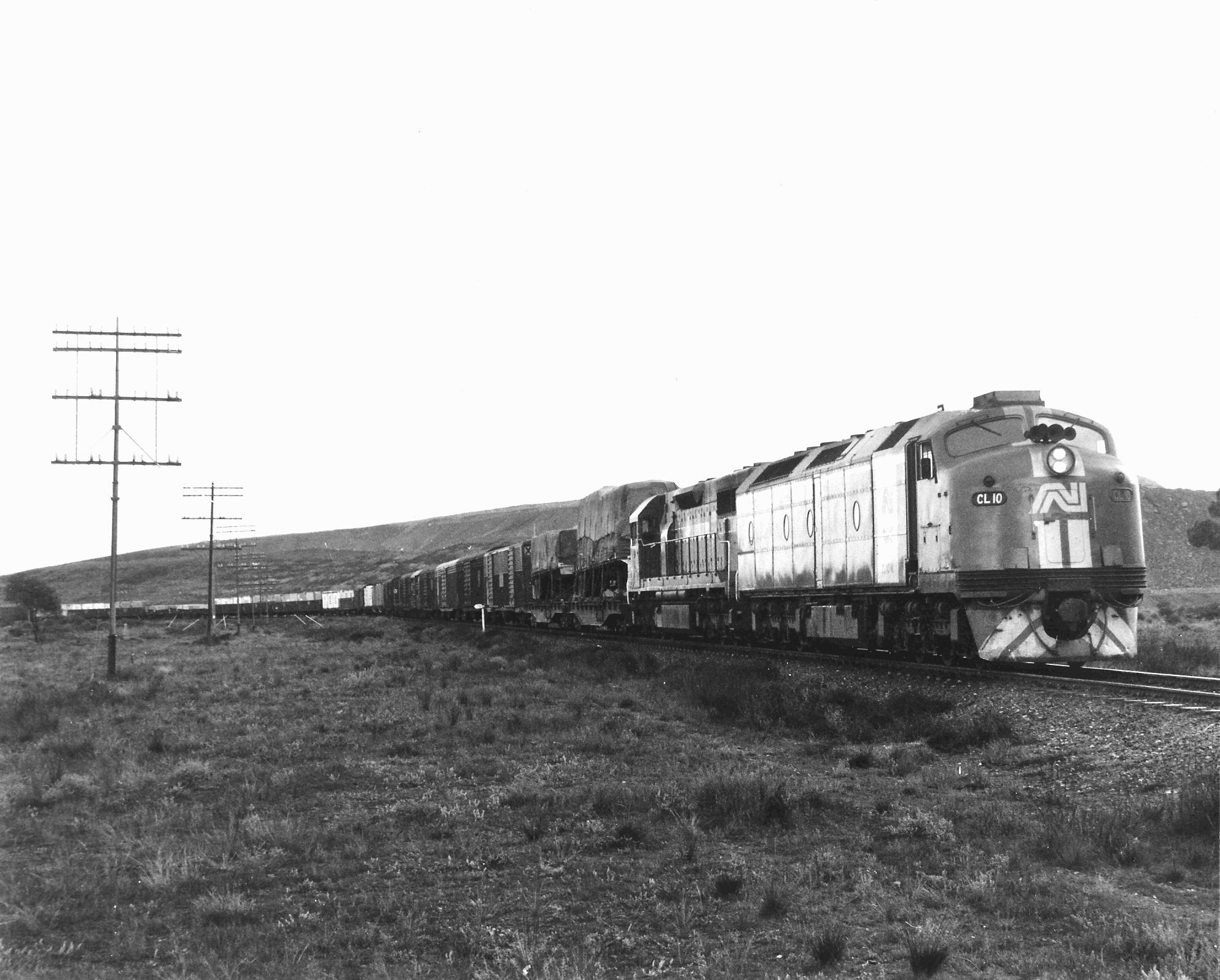
Australian National CL10 at Parkeston in August 1987

In 1968, Commonwealth Railways placed an order for five 2237 kW locomotives with Clyde Engineering to operate services on the Trans-Australian Railway from Port Pirie to Kalgoorlie. They were mechanically similar to the Western Australian L class of 1967. The initial design was to have a Do-Do wheel arrangement and a USA style EMD FP45 cab. This was later changed to a streamlined carbody and conventional Co-Co wheel arrangement.

== History ==
The first locomotive was completed in January 1970, with two further orders resulting in 17 locomotives being built with the last delivered in October 1972. Their operating sphere was extended through to Perth on Indian Pacific services and for a time in the 1970s they operated through to Lithgow, New South Wales. In July 1975, all were included in the transfer of Commonwealth Railways to Australian National. The CLs began to operate to Alice Springs and Adelaide when these were converted to standard gauge in 1980 and 1983. In 2004, they began to operate to Darwin following this line opening.

== Remanufacturing ==
In August 1992, Australian National awarded Morrison Knudsen Australia a contract to remanufacture the CLs at its Whyalla factory. As part of the deal, Morrison Knudsen purchased the locomotives and leased them back to Australian National for 12 years. Seven were rebuilt as CLFs to operate freight services and ten as CLPs with head end power to operate the Indian Pacific, Ghan, and Overland passenger services.

The rebuilding involved stripping back to the frame, with everything except for the nose section and monocoque frame removed. Changes included the EMD 645E3 engines being replaced with overhauled EMD 645E3C engines imported from Morrison Knudsen in the US, the original main alternators were rebuilt from AR10/A4-D14 to the AR10/A9-D14 type, refurbished D78 traction motors replaced the originals along with a new gear ratio, and new MK-LOC microprocessor controls were fitted. The cab was upgraded to modern standards, the brake setup was also changed from twin to single shoe per wheel, and a number of other small changes were made to assist maintenance.

After rebuilding, the locomotives did not retain their numbers, for example, the first locomotive converted was CL2 which emerged as CLF1. All were back in service by the end of 1993. The CLFs appeared in the standard Australian National green with yellow data panel, strip and B-end. The CLPs received a unique livery, with a lighter green nose, silver carbody, and a yellow stripe running from the nose to the rear.

In 1994, Australian National's interstate services were transferred to National Rail. The lease with Morrison Knudsen meant the locomotives could only be used on Australian National trains, or a higher lease fee would apply. As a result, the class were not seen on National Rail operated trains, and did not venture onto the wider national standard gauge network until Australian National won hook and pull contracts for private operator SCT Logistics.

From January 1994, CLPs began operating the Indian Pacific from Sydney to Perth, previously New South Wales and Western Australia used their own locomotives on the train when within their state borders. On conversion to standard gauge in 1995, The Overland was also hauled by CLPs. The use of the CLPs on passenger trains came to an end in November 1997, when the passenger operations of Australian National were sold to Great Southern Rail, who contracted National Rail to haul their trains.

CLP15 was involved in the Mount Christie head-on collision in February 1997, being stored for several months before scrapping in November the same year.

== Private ownership ==
In November 1997, the CL class were sold to Australian Southern Railroad (later Australian Railroad Group) with Australian National's remaining freight operations. With the splitting up of the Australian Railroad Group in June 2006, the CL class was split between Genesee & Wyoming Australia (later One Rail Australia) and QR National (later Aurizon). The Genesee & Wyoming Australia fleet mostly continued in service, with some stored for periods of time due to fleet requirements and loco failures, whereas the Aurizon fleet were all stored by 2013 and mostly sold to Apex International. Most of the Aurizon fleet was moved to NSW for storage in 2013, while CLF7 remained at North Dynon as it was in poor condition, and was later scrapped in 2016.

CL17 Under Restoration at the Seymour Railway Heritage Centre in November 2026

In mid-2017, a fund-raising campaign was started with the aim of purchasing CLP10 from Apex International and restoring it externally to its as-built condition as CL17. On 21 June 2018, it was announced that the campaign had been successful in raising the $150,000 required to purchase the locomotive for preservation.

In mid-2019, it was revealed that Southern Shorthaul Railroad (SSR) had purchased 4 locomotives from the Apex group. These included CLF1, CLF3, CLF4, CLP9 & CLP12, with 2204 (ex NSWGR 422 class locomotive 42216) also included in the sale. The locomotives were transferred from Goulburn to Cootamundra for reactivation, and they re-entered service between 2020 and 2023.

The remaining Apex group CLs were purchased by RailPower. These included CLF2, CLF4, CLP11, & CLP13. The CLFs were reactivated in 2020, CLP13 was reactivated in 2024, and CLP11 is yet to return to service.

On 8 March 2023, CLF1 and CLF4 were involved in a level crossing accident at Rockview, New South Wales. CLF1 was taken to SSR's workshops in Bendigo, Victoria and CLF4 was taken to MainTrain in Auburn, NSW. CLF1 was deemed economically irreparable, and is currently awaiting scrapping. As of 2026, CLF4 is still undergoing repairs at MainTrain.

The Genesee & Wyoming Australia CLs remained part of the company during its rebrand to One Rail Australia (ORA) in 2020, and an overhaul program commenced in the same year with CLP8, CLP14 and CLP16 receiving rust repairs, repaints and CCO's during this time. The CLs were included in Aurizon's purchase of ORA in 2022, and overhauls continued into the mid-2020s, with CLP17 becoming the first CL to appear in full Aurizon livery when released from repaint in 2025.

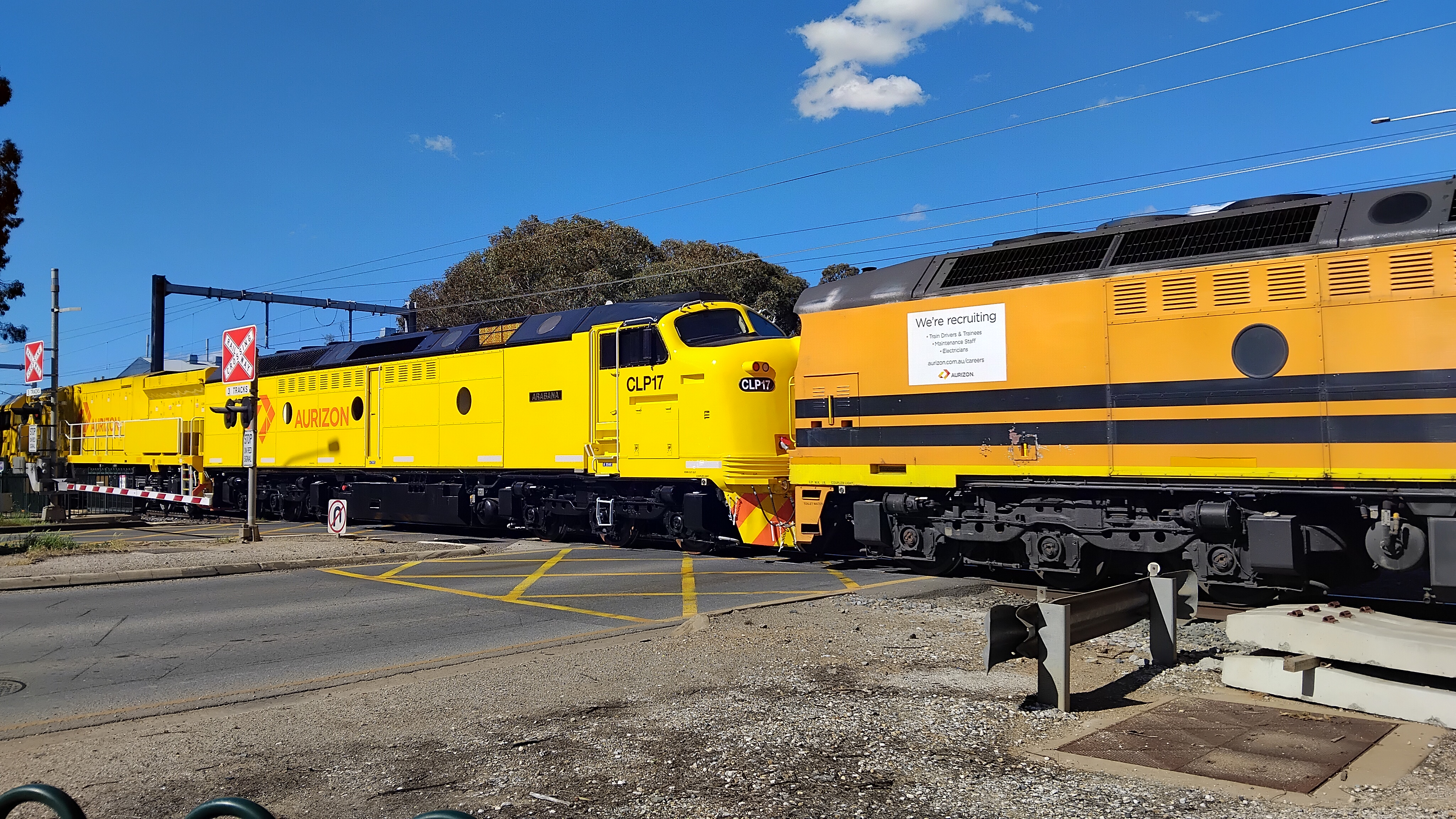
Repainted Aurizon CLP17 on 6DA2 in September 2025

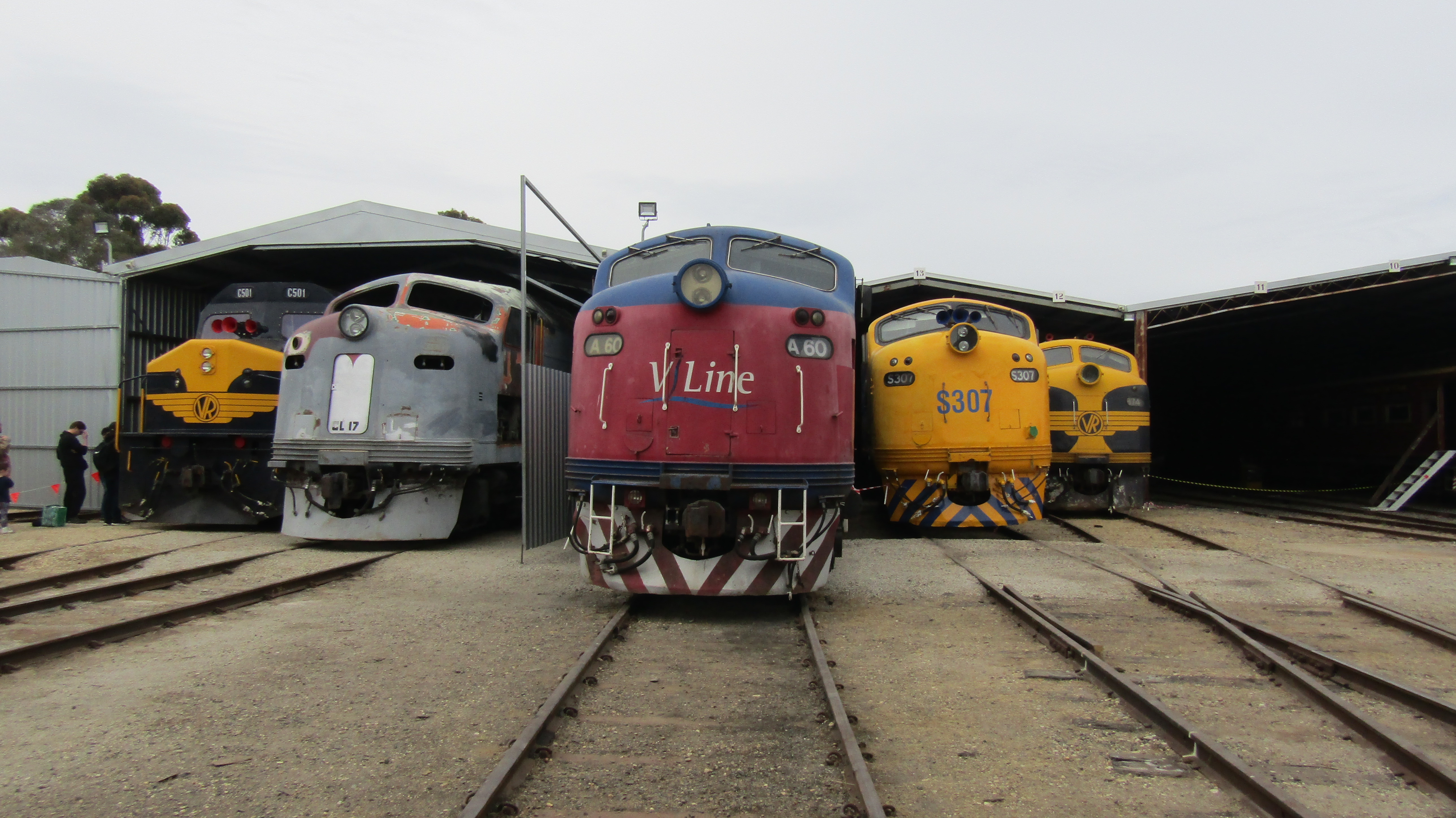
CL17 during restoration with Seymour Railway Heritage Centre locomotives C501, A60, S307 and B74 during a SRHC open day in 2024

== Class list ==
Key:	In service	Stored	Preserved	Under Restoration	Under Repair	Scrapped

Class List.
Original Number	Entered service	Renumbered As	Rebuild Serial	Name	Current/Last Owner	Livery	Status
CL1	February 1970	CLP15	93-AN-15	John Gorton (formerly) Kokatha	Australian National	AN Green, Yellow and Silver	Scrapped
CL2	March 1970	CLF1	93-AN-1	City of Whyalla (formerly) Milton Bromwich	Southern Shorthaul Railroad	Southern Shorthaul Railroad	Accident Damaged, March 2023. Deemed beyond economical repair and is awaiting scrapping.
CL3	April 1970	CLP13	93-AN-13	Nukunu (formerly) White Knight	RailPower	Primer White with RailPower Logos	Reactivated November 2024
CL4	May 1970	CLP14	93-AN-14	Barngarla	Aurizon	ORA Orange & Black with Aurizon Logos	In service
CL5	July 1970	CLF4	93-AN-4		RailPower	Undercoat	Accident Damaged, March 2023. Under Repair
CL6	November 1970	CLF6	93-AN-6		Aurizon	Overhaul into Aurizon Canary	Out of service
CL7	November 1970	CLF3	93-AN-3	Space Ghost (formerly) Jason Ferguson	Southern Shorthaul Railroad	SSR Black and Silver	In service
CL8	January 1971	CLP17	93-AN-17	Arabana	Aurizon	Aurizon Yellow with Black Roof	In Service
CL9	March 1971	CLP8	93-AN-8	Gough Whitlam (formerly) City of Port Augusta	Aurizon	ORA Orange & Black with Aurizon Logos	In service
CL10	April 1971	CLP16	93-AN-16	Murunitja	Aurizon	ORA Orange & Black with Aurizon Logos	In service
CL11	June 1971	CLF2	93-AN-2		RailPower	ARG Orange and Black with Railpower Logos	In service
CL12	July 1971	CLF5	93-AN-5		Aurizon	GWA Orange & Black	In service
CL13	August 1971	CLP9	93-AN-9	Peter Wilks	Southern Shorthaul Railroad	Auscision Models	In service
CL14	December 1971	CLP11	93-AN-11	Charlie Jones (formerly) Kaurna	RailPower	QRN - Maroon, Yellow and Black	Stored (Goulburn)
CL15	January 1972	CLP12	93-AN-12	Ngadjuri (formerly) Casper	Southern Shorthaul Railroad	Primer White with SSR Logos	In service
CL16	March 1972	CLF7	93-AN-7		Aurizon	ARG Orange & Black	Scrapped
CL17	June 1972	CLP10	93-AN-10	William McMahon (formerly) Mirning (formerly)	Streamliners Australia	Undercoat Grey (to be restored to original condition in Commonwealth Railways livery)	Preserved - Under Restoration
