= Arc Infrastructure =

Railway infrastructure owner in Western Australia

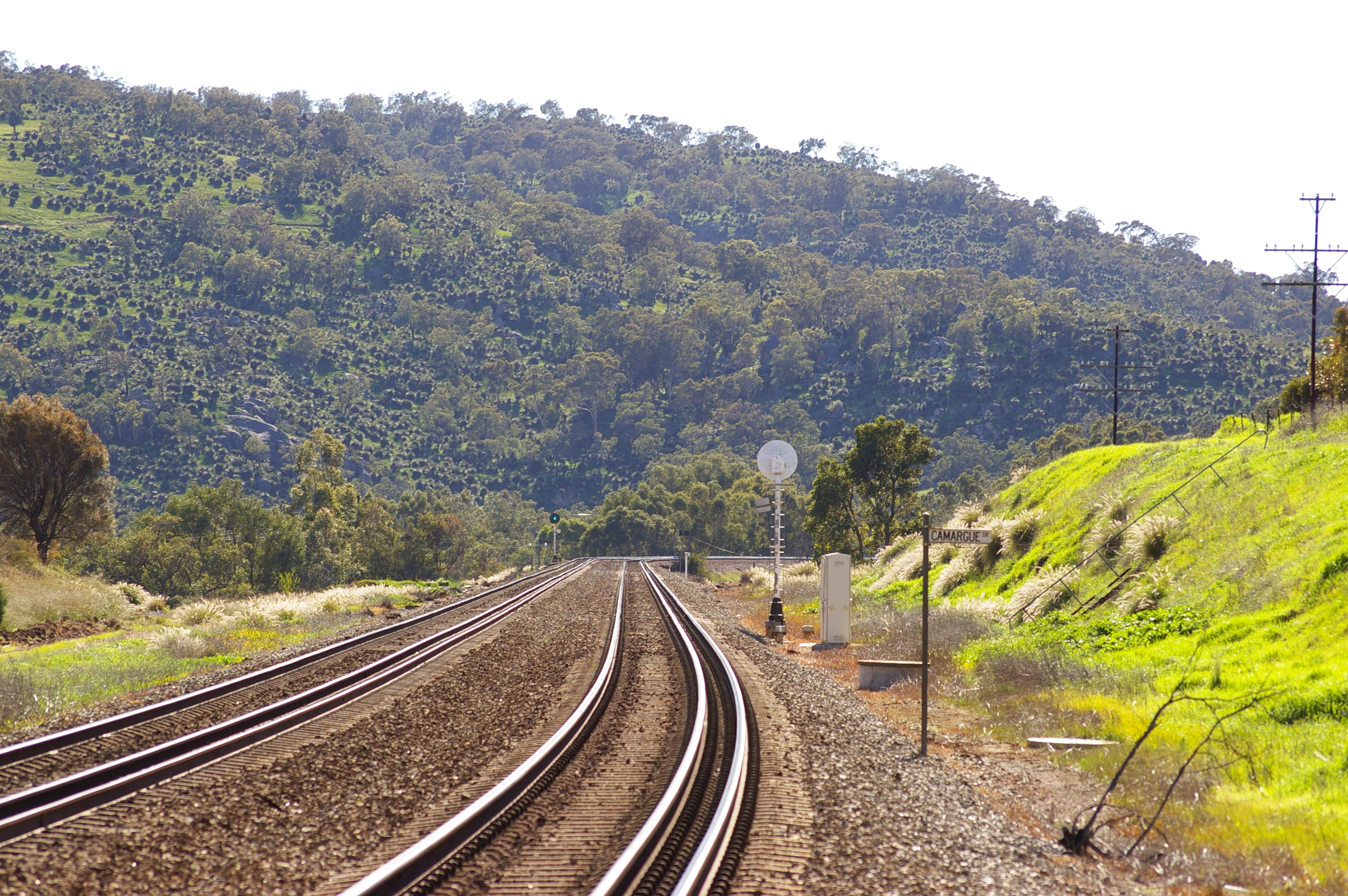
- Dual gauge Eastern Railway line in July 2007
- Formerly: Brookfield Rail; WestNet Rail
- Industry: Railway infrastructure manager
- Predecessor: Australian Railroad Group
- Founded: 2006
- Headquarters: Perth Airport, Australia
- Area served: Western Australia
- Key people: Stephanie Unwin (CEO)
- Total assets: lease on 5,500 km Western Australia rail network until 2049
- Parent: Brookfield Infrastructure Partners
- Website: www.arcinfra.com

Arc Infrastructure, formerly Brookfield Rail and WestNet Rail, is a rail infrastructure manager and access provider in Western Australia with a long-term lease on the network from the Government of Western Australia. It operates approximately 5,500 km of standard, narrow and dual gauge rail infrastructure in the southern half of the state.

== History ==
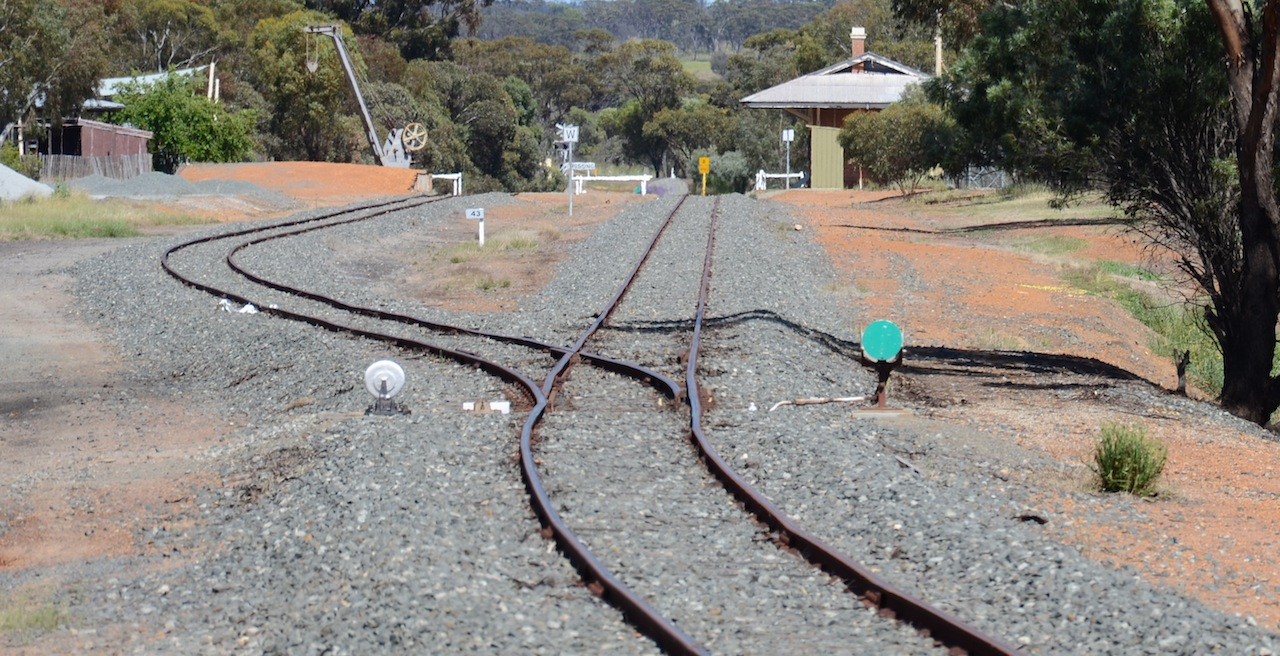
Wickepin yard in October 2013

In December 2000, the State Government privatised Westrail, with the Australian Railroad Group, a 50/50 joint venture between Genesee & Wyoming and Wesfarmers, the successful bidder. Included in the sale was a 49-year lease on the below rail infrastructure network. This part of the business was rebranded as WestNet Rail.

On 1 June 2006, Australian Railroad Group was sold with the above rail rolling stock and terminal assets passing to QR National, and the below rail infrastructure business to Babcock & Brown Infrastructure. Initially Babcock & Brown held a 51% shareholding, the remaining 49% being held by minority shareholders with Babcock & Brown having an option to increase its holding. In March 2008 Babcock & Brown increased its shareholding to 76%. It later took full ownership.

In late 2009, Babcock & Brown Infrastructure was renamed Prime Infrastructure and again by December 2010 to Brookfield Infrastructure Partners following Brookfield Asset Management's purchase of the business. In August 2011, WestNet Rail was rebranded as Brookfield Rail.

In 2017, Brookfield Rail relocated its headquarters from Welshpool to Perth Airport. In July 2017, the company was again rebranded as Arc Infrastructure.

In the lead-up to the 2025 state election, the Cook state government announced it would explore options to return the network to public ownership. During the 2025 Australian federal election campaign, the Albanese government announced funding for a feasibility study to renationalise the network.

== Operations ==
Arc Infrastructure has a lease until 2049 on 5,500 kilometres (3,400 mi) of rail infrastructure throughout the southern half of Western Australia, from Geraldton in the north, to Leonora and Kalgoorlie in the east, and south to Esperance, Albany and Bunbury.

It is responsible for maintaining the network and granting access to operators.
