= List of companies of New Zealand =

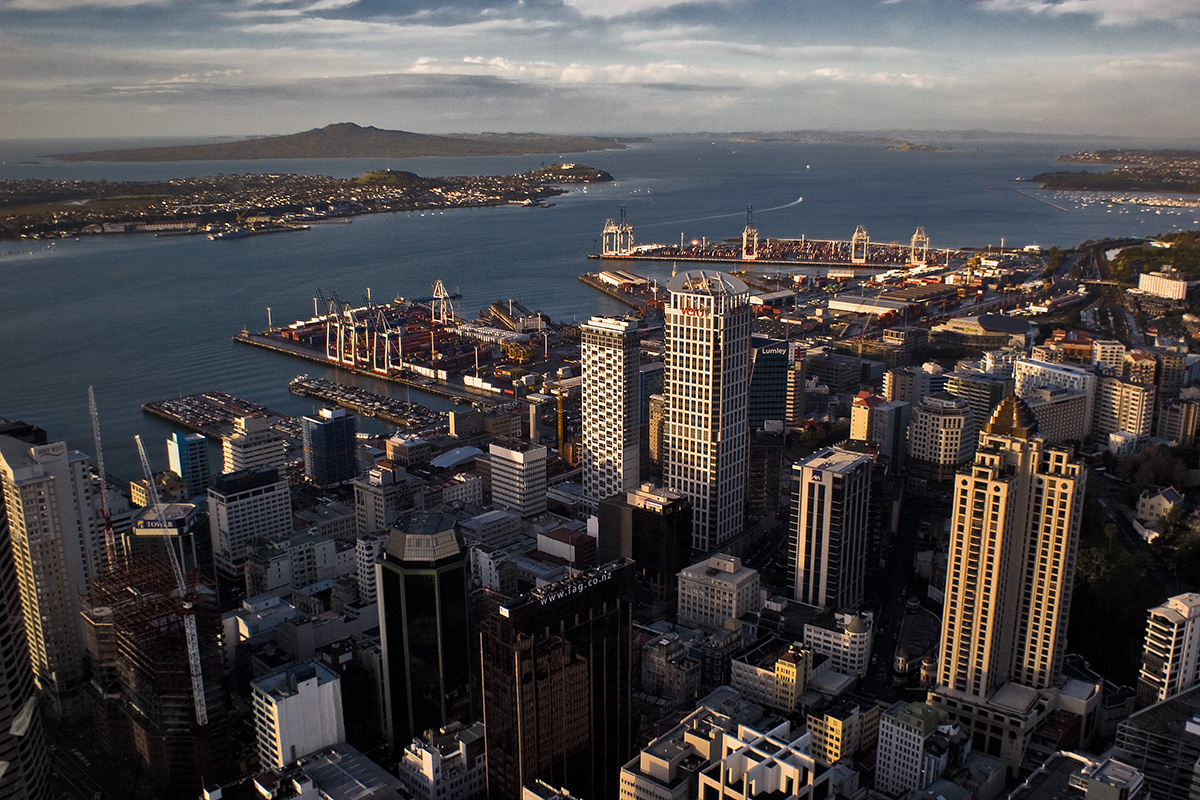
Auckland CBD contains New Zealand's largest concentration of multi-story commercial buildings and businesses.

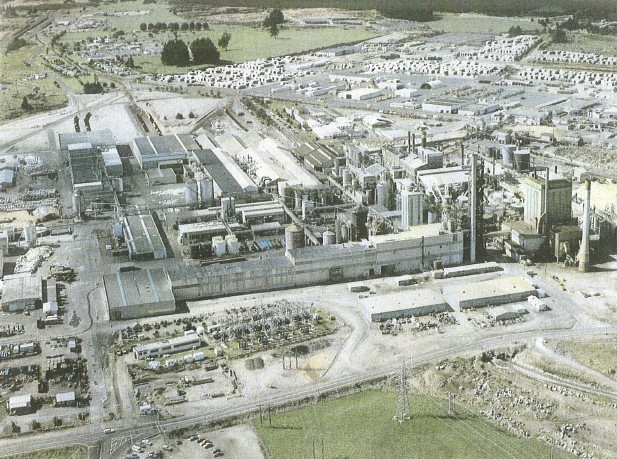
The Kinleith Mill, part of the forestry sector in New Zealand

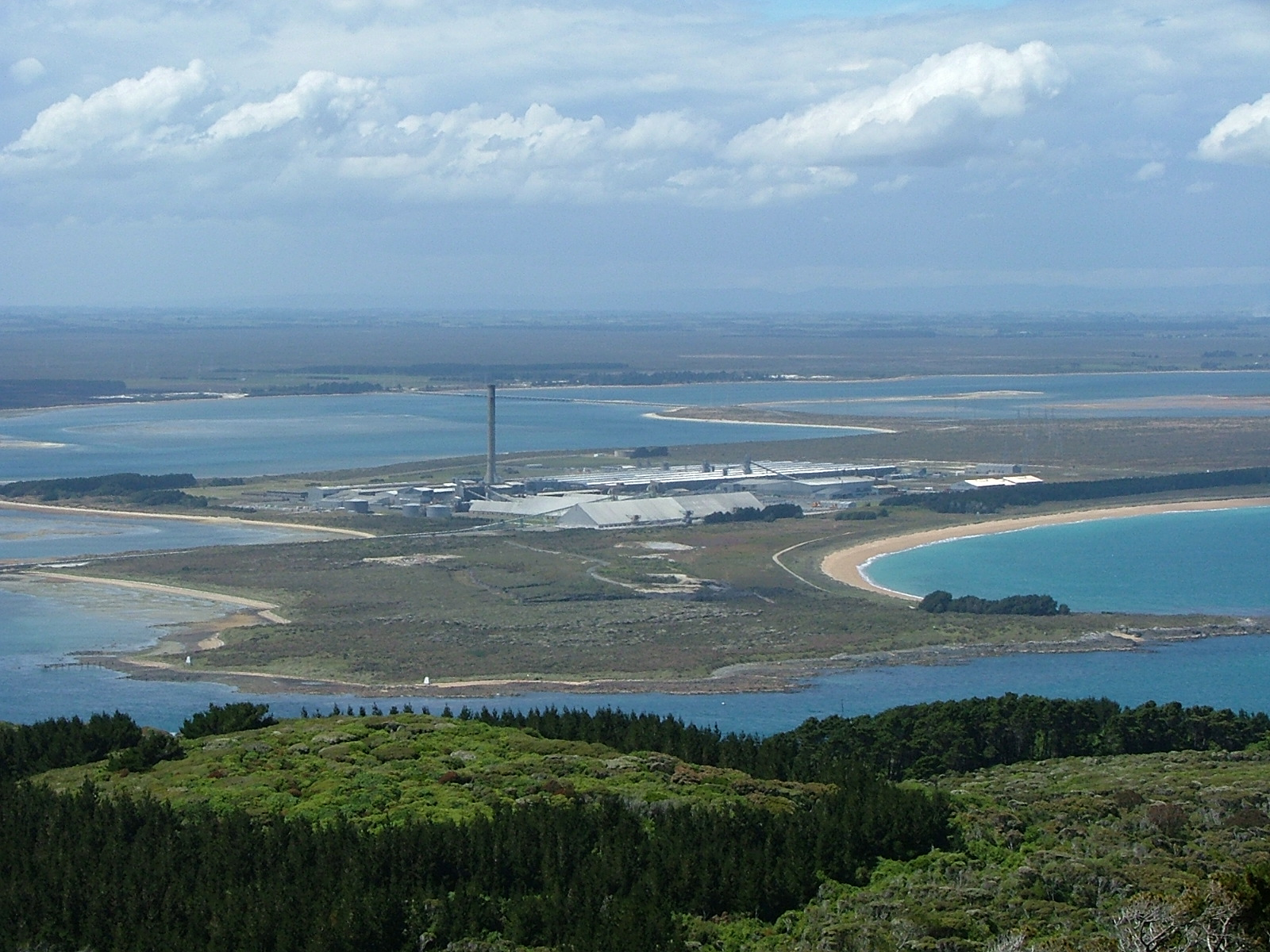
The Tiwai Point Aluminium Smelter, opened in 1971

The following notable companies are based in New Zealand. For further information on the types of business entities in this country and their abbreviations, see "Business entities in New Zealand".

New Zealand is a wealthy country, with a relatively high GDP per capita and a relatively low rate of poverty.. Since the 1980s, New Zealand has transformed from an agrarian, regulated economy to a more industrialised, free market economy that can compete globally. Since 1984, government subsidies including for agriculture have been eliminated; import regulations have been liberalised; exchange rates have been freely floated; controls on interest rates, wages, and prices have been removed; and marginal rates of taxation reduced. The restructuring and sale of state-owned enterprises in the 1990s reduced government's role in the economy. Many of the largest companies lost ground and new enterprises were established. New Zealand companies are dependent on international trade, mainly with Australia, the European Union, the United States, China, South Korea, Japan and Canada. The major capital market is the New Zealand Exchange, known as the NZX.

== Largest firms ==
In 2024 Statistic NZ reported that 97% of the companies entirely within New Zealand are classed as small businesses. The Financial Reporting Act 1993 defines a large company as one that satisfies at least one of two criteria:

- Total assets of the entity and its subsidiaries (if any) exceed NZ$60 million.
- Total revenue of the entity and its subsidiaries (if any) exceeds NZ$30 million.

Several of the largest firms are listed below:

Name	2022 revenues (NZ$ million)	Employees (globally)	Revenue per employee (NZ$ thousand)	Notes
Fonterra	22,953	19,608	1171	New Zealand's largest company. A dairy giant that controls 30% of the world's dairy exports.
Fletcher Building	8,498	20,000	425	Construction company, with a market capitalisation of over NZ$7 billion.
Woolworths	7,585	20,000	379	Retail chain; wholly owned subsidiary of Australia's Woolworths Group
Air New Zealand	2,734	8,860	308	Flag carrier of New Zealand
Spark New Zealand	3,694	5,144	718	Largest telecommunications company in New Zealand

== Notable firms ==
This list includes notable companies with primary headquarters located in the country. The industry and sector follow the Industry Classification Benchmark taxonomy. Organisations which have ceased operations are included and noted as defunct.

For convenience, the word "Limited", which every company registered or re-registered under the Companies Act 1993 must have at the end of its name, is reduced to the common and universally recognised term "Ltd", which is a specifically permitted abbreviation under the Act. In the New Zealand registration system, unlike those of some other countries, the term "Incorporated" is restricted to societies (generally nonprofit) under the Incorporated Societies Act 1908.

Notable companies Status: P=Private, S=State; A=Active, D=Defunct
Name	Industry	Sector	Headquarters	Founded	Notes	Status	
2degrees	Telecommunications	Mobile telecommunications	Auckland	2009	Telecommunications	P	A
AFFCO Holdings	Consumer goods	Food products	Hamilton	1904	Meatworks, subsidiary of Talley's Group	P	A
AHI Roofing	Industrials	Building materials & fixtures	Auckland	1957	Roof tiles	P	A
Air New Zealand	Consumer services	Airlines	Auckland	1965	Airline (NZX: AIR)	P	A
Airwork	Consumer services	Airlines	Auckland	1984	Airline	P	A
Alliance Group	Consumer goods	Food products	Invercargill	1948	Freezing works	P	A
Auckland Airport	Industrials	Transportation services	Auckland	1998	Airport (NZX: AIA)	P	A
Aurora Energy	Utilities	Conventional electricity	Dunedin	1990	Electricity distribution, 100% Dunedin Council-owned	P	A
Bank of New Zealand	Financials	Banks	Auckland	1861	Bank, subsidiary of National Australia Bank	P	A
Barfoot & Thompson	Financials	Real estate services	Auckland	1923	Property sales and management	P	A
Black + White Mobile	Telecommunications	Mobile telecommunications	Auckland	2008	Mobile phone sales	P	D
Blis Technologies	Health care	Biotechnology	Dunedin	2000	Biotech	P	A
Bridget Williams Books	Consumer services	Publishing	Wellington	1990	Publishing	P	A
Cavalier Corporation	Consumer goods	Furnishings	Auckland	1984	Carpets (NZX: CAV)	P	A
Cloudy Bay Vineyards	Consumer goods	Distillers & vintners	Blenheim	1985	Winery, subsidiary of LVMH	P	A
Contact Energy	Utilities	Conventional electricity	Wellington	1996	Electricity generation and retail (NZX: CEN)	P	A
Datacom Group	Technology	Software	Wellington	1965	IT services	P	A
Designline	Industrials	Commercial vehicles & trucks	Ashburton	1985	Buses, defunct 2011	P	D
Douglas Pharmaceuticals	Health care	Pharmaceuticals	Auckland	1967	Pharmaceuticals	P	A
Eurekster	Technology	Software	Christchurch	2004	Search engines, defunct c. 2010	P	D
Fisher & Paykel	Consumer goods	Durable household products	Auckland	1934	Appliances, subsidiary of Haier	P	A
Fisher & Paykel Healthcare	Health care	Medical equipment	Auckland	1934	Medical equipment (NZX: FPH)	P	A
Fletcher Challenge	Industrials	Heavy construction	Auckland	1981	Diversified multi-national	P	D
Fletcher Building	Industrials	Heavy construction	Auckland	2001	Construction and infrastructure (NZX: FBU)	P	A
FMG Insurance	Financials	Full line insurance	Wellington	1978	Insurance	P	A
Fonterra	Consumer goods	Food products	Auckland	2001	Dairy	P	A
Foodstuffs	Consumer services	Specialty retailers	Auckland / Wellington	1922	FMCG	P	A
GAS Petrol Service Stations	Consumer services	Specialty retailers	Auckland	1999	Fuel retailer	P	A
Gecko Press	Consumer services	Publishing	Wellington	2005	Children's books	P	A
Genesis Energy Limited	Utilities	Conventional electricity	Auckland	1999	Electricity generation, 51% government owned (NZX: GNE)	S	A
Golden Bay Air	Consumer services	Airlines	Auckland	2006	Airline	P	A
Griffin's Foods	Consumer goods	Food products	Auckland	1864	Snacks and biscuits, part of Intersnack (Germany)	P	A
Grove Mill	Consumer goods	Distillers & vintners	Marlborough	1988	Winery	P	A
Harcourts International	Financials	Real estate services	Wellington	1988	Real estate sales	P	A
Heartland Bank	Financials	Banks	Auckland	2011	Publicly listed registered bank and finance company	P	A
Hubbard Foods	Consumer goods	Food products	Auckland	1990	Acquired by Walter & Wild, cereals	P	A
Infratil	Conglomerates	-	Wellington	1994	Airports, electricity generators and retailers (NZX: IFT)	P	A
Invivo Wines	Consumer goods	Distillers & vintners	Auckland	2008	Winery	P	A
Jade Software Corporation	Technology	Software	Christchurch	1978	Software	P	A
Kiwi Property Group	Financials	Real estate holding & development	Auckland	1992	Property investment (NZX: KPG)	P	A
Kiwibank	Financials	Banks	Wellington	2001	Banking and financial services	S	A
KMD Brands	Retail	Outdoor and travel apparel, gear and accessories (NZX: KMD)	Christchurch	1987	Retailer of outdoor and travel apparel, gear and accessories	P	A
Kordia	Consumer services	Broadcasting & entertainment	Auckland	2003	State-owned broadcaster	S	A
Landcorp	Consumer goods	Farming & fishing	Wellington	1987	State-owned farming	S	A
Macpac Wilderness Equipment	Consumer services	Specialty retailers	Christchurch	1973	Outdoors retailer	P	A
Mainfreight	Industrials	Delivery services	Auckland	1978	Freight (NZX: MFT)	P	A
McDonald's New Zealand	Consumer services	Restaurants & bars	Auckland	1975	Fast food chain, part of McDonald's (US)	P	A
MediaWorks New Zealand	Consumer services	Broadcasting & entertainment	Auckland	2004	Television	P	A
Mercury Energy	Utilities	Conventional electricity	Auckland	1999	Electricity generation, 51% government owned (NZX: MCY)	S	A
Meridian Energy	Utilities	Conventional electricity	Wellington	1998	Electricity generation, 51% government owned (NZX: MEL)	S	A
My Food Bag	Consumer services	Food retailers & wholesalers	Auckland	2012	Online retailer	P	A
New Zealand Aluminium Smelters	Basic materials	Aluminium	Wellington	1971	Aluminium	P	A
Northport	Industrials	Transportation services	Marsden Point	2000	Port, 50% owned by Port of Tauranga	P	A
NZ Bus	Consumer services	Travel & tourism	Wellington	1992	Public transport provider.	P	A
NZ Post	Industrials	Delivery services	Wellington	1987	Postal service	S	A
NZX	Financials	Investment services	Wellington	2002	Exchange (NZX: NZX)	P	A
One NZ	Telecommunications	Mobile telecommunications, fixed telecommunications	Auckland	1998	Telecommunications, 100% New Zealand owned; formerly Vodafone NZ	P	A
Pacific Edge	Health care	Medical equipment	Dunedin	2001	Bladder cancer diagnostic tools (NZX: PEB)	P	A
Pernod Ricard NZ	Consumer goods	Distillers & vintners	Auckland	1975	Winery	P	A
PGG Wrightson	Industrials	Industrial suppliers	Christchurch	2005	Agricultural supply (NZX: PGW)	P	A
phil&teds	Consumer goods	Durable household products	Wellington	1994	Baby care products	P	A
Pike River Coal	Basic materials	Coal	Wellington	1982	Coal mining, defunct 2017	P	D
Port of Tauranga	Industrials	Transportation services	Tauranga	1988	Port (NZX: POT)	P	A
Ports of Auckland	Industrials	Transportation services	Auckland	1988	Port	P	A
Pumpkin Patch	Consumer services	Apparel retailers	Auckland	1990	Retail chain, defunct 2016 (NZX: PPL)	P	D
Pushpay	Technology	Software	Auckland	2011	Mobile payment software	P	A
Rakon	Technology	Software	Auckland	1967	Technology (NZX: RAK)	P	A
Restaurant Brands	Consumer services	Restaurants & bars	Auckland	1989	Fast foods (NZX: RCD)	P	A
Rocket Lab	Aerospace manufacturing and space launch services	Rockets, satellites	Auckland	2006	Technology (NZX: RAK)	P	A
Ryman Healthcare	Health care	Health care providers	Christchurch	1984	Retirement villages and aged care (NZX: RYM)	P	A
Skellerup Holdings	Industrials	Diversified industrials	Christchurch	1910	Industrial/rubber (NZX: SKL)	P	A
Sky Network Television	Consumer services	Broadcasting & entertainment	Auckland	1987	Television (NZX: SKT)	P	A
Skycity Entertainment Group	Consumer services	Hotels	Auckland	1996	Hotels, casinos (NZX: SKC)	P	A
SLI Systems	Technology	Software	Christchurch	2001	eCommerce solutions, search engines	P	A
Solid Energy	Basic materials	Coal	Wellington	1987	State-owned coal mining, defunct 2018	S	D
South Canterbury Finance	Financials	Consumer finance	Timaru	1926	Financial services, defunct 2010	P	D
Spark New Zealand	Telecommunications	Fixed line telecommunications	Auckland	1987	Telecom, formerly called Telecom New Zealand (NZX: SPK)	P	A
State Insurance	Financials	Full line insurance	Auckland	1990	Insurance, part of Insurance Australia Group	P	A
Summerset Holdings	Health care	Health care providers	Wellington	1996	Retirement villages and aged care (NZX: SUM)	P	A
Talley's Group	Consumer goods	Farming & fishing	Motueka	1936	Fishery	P	A
Te Mata Estate	Consumer goods	Distillers & vintners	Havelock North	1919	Winery	P	A
Todd Corporation	Oil & gas	Exploration & production	Wellington	1884	Energy	P	A
Tourism Holdings	Consumer services	Travel & tourism	Auckland	1984	Tourism (NZX: THL)	P	A
Tower Insurance	Financials	Full line insurance	Wellington	1864	Insurance	P	A
TR Group	Finance	Heavy vehicle rental and lease	Auckland	1992	Also driver training, vehicle sales	P	A
Traffic Design Group	Industrials	Transportation services	Lower Hutt	1976	Traffic consulting	P	A
Trimax Mowing Systems	Industrials	Diversified industrials	Tauranga	1981	Turf equipment	P	A
Trustpower	Utilities	Conventional electricity	Tauranga	1993	Electricity generation (NZX: TPW)	P	A
Vector	Utilities	Conventional electricity	Auckland	1999	Electricity distribution (NZX: VCT)	P	A
Vend	Technology	Software	Auckland	2010	Retail software	P	A
Vista Group	Technology	Software	Auckland	2014	Cinema industry software (NZX: VGL)	P	A
The Warehouse Group	Consumer services	Broadline retailers	Auckland	1982	Retail stores (NZX: WHS)	P	A
Wellington Airport	Industrials	Transportation services	Wellington	1998	Airport, joint venture between Infratil and the Wellington City Council	P	A
Westland Milk Products	Consumer goods	Food products	Hokitika	1937	Dairy products, part of Yili Group (China)	P	A
Wētā FX	Entertainment	Film	Wellington	1993	Digital visual effects	P	A
Wētā Workshop	Entertainment	Film	Wellington	1987	Visual effects	P	A
Woolworths	Consumer services	Food retailers & wholesalers	Auckland	1949	Grocer chain, subsidiary of Australia's Woolworths Group	P	A
Xero	Technology	Software	Wellington	2006	Accounting software (ASX: XRO)	P	A
Yealands Estate	Consumer goods	Distillers & vintners	Seddon	2008	Winery, subsidiary of Marlborough Lines Limited	P	A
Z Energy	Oil and energy	Fuel, oil & diesel	Wellington	1911	Founded as Shell New Zealand	P	A
Zespri	Consumer goods	Food products	Tauranga	1997	Fruits	P	A

== See also ==
- List of companies listed on the New Zealand Exchange
- List of South Island companies
- New Zealand Companies Office
- NZX 50 Index – the main stock market index in New Zealand
- State-owned enterprises of New Zealand
