= List of companies listed on the New Zealand Exchange =

List of companies on the NZX

This is a list of companies (equities and funds) on the NZX, the national stock exchange main board.

Stock name	Symbol	Country of origin	Notes
Ascension Capital	NZX: ACE		
AFC Group	NZX: AFC	Australia	
Australian Foundation Investment Company	NZX: AFI		
AFT Pharmaceuticals	NZX: AFT	New Zealand	
Smartshares Global Aggregarte Bond ETF	NZX: AGG	New Zealand	
Accordant Group	NZX: AGL		
Auckland International Airport Limited	NZX: AIA	New Zealand	
Air New Zealand	NZX: AIR	New Zealand	
Auckland Real Estate Trust	NZX: AKL		
Allied Farmers	NZX: ALF	New Zealand	
ANZ Bank	NZX: ANZ	Australia	
The Asia Pacific Trust	NZX: APA	New Zealand	
Asset Plus	NZX: APL	New Zealand	
ArborGen Holdings	NZX: ARB		
Argosy Property	NZX: ARG	New Zealand	
Arvida Group	NZX: ARV	New Zealand	
Blackpearl Group	NZX: BPG	New Zealand	
Smartshares Australian Dividend ETF	NZX: ASD	New Zealand	
Smartshares Australian Financials ETF	NZX: ASF	New Zealand	
Smartshares Australian Property ETF	NZX: ASP	New Zealand	
Smartshares Australian Resources ETF	NZX: ASR	New Zealand	
The a2 Milk Company	NZX: ATM	New Zealand	
Smartshares S&P/ASX 200 ETF	NZX: AUS	New Zealand	
Burger Fuel	NZX: BFG	New Zealand	
Blackwell Global Holdings	NZX: BGI	New Zealand	
Briscoe Group	NZX: BGP	New Zealand	
The Bankers Investment Trust plc	NZX: BIT	United Kingdom	
Blis Technologies	NZX: BLT	New Zealand	
Smartshares Automation and Robotics ETF	NZX: BOT	New Zealand	
Barramundi	NZX: BRM	New Zealand	
Barramundi Warrants	NZX: BRMWF	New Zealand	
Cavalier Corporation	NZX: CAV	New Zealand	
Cannasouth	NZX: CBD	New Zealand	
CDL Investment New Zealand	NZX: CDI	New Zealand	
Contact Energy	NZX: CEN	New Zealand	
Cooks Global Foods	NZX: CGF	New Zealand	
The Colonial Motor Company	NZX: CMO	New Zealand	
Chorus	NZX: CNU	New Zealand	
Carbon Fund	NZX: CO2	New Zealand	
Chatham Rock Phosphate	NZX: CRP	New Zealand	
Comvita Limited	NZX: CVT	New Zealand	
Delegat Group	NZX: DGL	New Zealand	
Smartshares NZ Dividend ETF	NZX: DIV	New Zealand	
Downer EDI Works	NZX: DOW	Australia	
Ebos Group	NZX: EBO	New Zealand	
Greenfern Industries	NZX: GFI	New Zealand	
Smartshares Emerging Markets ETF	NZX: EMF	New Zealand	
Smartshares Emerging Markets Equities ESG ETF	NZX: EMG	New Zealand	
Enprise Group	NZX: ENS	New Zealand	
Eroad	NZX: ERD	New Zealand	
Smartshares Global Equities ESG ETF	NZX: EUG	New Zealand	
Smartshares Europe ETF	NZX: EUF	New Zealand	
Smartshares Europe Equities ESG ETF	NZX: EUG	New Zealand	
Evolve Education Group	NZX: EVO	New Zealand	
Fletcher Building	NZX: FBU	New Zealand	
Foreign & Colonial Investment Trust plc	NZX: FCT	United Kingdom	
Smartshares NZ Top 50 ETF	NZX: FNZ	New Zealand	
Fisher & Paykel Healthcare	NZX: FPH	New Zealand	
Freightways	NZX: FRE	New Zealand	
Fonterra Shareholder's Fund	NZX: FSF	New Zealand	
Foley Wines	NZX: FWL	New Zealand	
Smartshares Global Bond ETF	NZX: GBF	New Zealand	
General Capital	NZX: GEN		
General Capital Warrants	NZX: GENWB		
Geo Limited	NZX: GEO	New Zealand	
Geneva Finance	NZX: GFL		
Goodman Property Trust	NZX: GMT	New Zealand	
Genesis Energy Limited	NZX: GNE	New Zealand	
Good Spirits Hospitality	NZX: GSH		
Gentrack Group Ltd	NZX: GTK	New Zealand	
Goodwood Capital	NZX: GWC		
Green Cross Health	NZX: GXH	New Zealand	
Henderson Far East Fund	NZX: HFL	New Zealand	
Heartland Group Holdings	NZX: HGH	New Zealand	
Hallenstein Glassons Holdings	NZX: HLG	New Zealand	
Harmoney Group	NZX: HMY		
Infratil	NZX: IFT	New Zealand	
ikeGPS	NZX: IKE	New Zealand	
Investore Property	NZX: IPL	New Zealand	
Just Life Group	NZX: JLG	New Zealand	
JPMorgan Global Growth & Income plc	NZX: JPG	United Kingdom	
Smartshares Japan Equities ESG ETF	NZX: JPN	New Zealand	
Kingfish Limited	NZX: KFL	New Zealand	
Kingfish Limited Warrants	NZX: KFLWF	New Zealand	
KMD Brands	NZX: KMD	New Zealand	
Kiwi Property	NZX: KPG	New Zealand	
Livestock Improvement Corporation	NZX: LIC		
Smartshares Healthcare Innovation ETF	NZX: LIV	New Zealand	
Millennium & Copthorne Hotels	NZX: MCK	New Zealand	
Millennium & Copthorne Hotels New Zealand Preference	NZX: MCKPA	New Zealand	
Mercury Energy	NZX: MCY	New Zealand	
Smartshares NZ Mid Cap ETF	NZX: MDZ	New Zealand	
Me Today	NZX: MEE		
Meridian Energy	NZX: MEL	New Zealand	
Mainfreight	NZX: MFT	New Zealand	
Michael Hill Jeweller	NZX: MHJ	New Zealand	
MHM Automation	NZX: MHM		
Marlin Global	NZX: MLN	New Zealand	
Marsden Maritime Holding	NZX: MMH	New Zealand	
Moa Group Limited	NZX: MOA	New Zealand	
Metro Performance Glass	NZX: MPG	New Zealand	
Marlborough Wine Estates Group	NZX: MWE		
Smartshares Australian Mid Cap ETF	NZX: MZY	New Zealand	
Smartshares S&P/NZX NZ Government Bond ETF	NZX: NGB	New Zealand	
My Food Bag	NZX: MFB	New Zealand	
New Zealand Property Trust	NZX: NPF	New Zealand	
Napier Port Holdings	NZX: NPH		
New Zealand Rural Land Company	NZX: NZL	New Zealand	
New Talisman Gold Mines	NZX: NTL	New Zealand	
New Talisman Gold Mines Options	NZX: NTLOB	New Zealand	
NZ Windfarms	NZX: NWF	New Zealand	
Smartshares NZ Bond ETF	NZX: NZB	New Zealand	
Smartshares NZ Cash ETF	NZX: NZC	New Zealand	
Smartshares S&P/NZX 50 ETF	NZX: NZG	New Zealand	
NZ King Salmon Investments	NZX: NZK	New Zealand	
New Zealand Rural Land Company	NZX: NZL		
New Zealand Media and Entertainment	NZX: NZM	New Zealand	
New Zealand Oil & Gas	NZX: NZO	New Zealand	
The New Zealand Refining Company	NZX: NZR	New Zealand	
NZX	NZX: NZX	New Zealand	
Oceania Healthcare	NZX: OCA		
Smartshares Australian Top 20 ETF	NZX: OZY	New Zealand	
Precinct Properties New Zealand	NZX: PCT	New Zealand	
Precinct Properties New Zealand Convertible Notes	NZX: PCTHA	New Zealand	
Pacific Edge Limited	NZX: PEB	New Zealand	
Property for Industry	NZX: PFI	New Zealand	
PGG Wrightson	NZX: PGW	New Zealand	
Promisia Healthcare	NZX: PHL		
Private Land and Property Fund	NZX: PLP		
Port of Tauranga	NZX: POT	New Zealand	
Pushpay Holdings	NZX: PPH	New Zealand	
Plexure Group	NZX: PX1	New Zealand	
PaySauce Limited	NZX: PYS	New Zealand	
QEX Logistics Limited	NZX: QEX	New Zealand	
Radius Residential Care	NZX: RAD		
Rakon	NZX: RAK	New Zealand	
Restaurant Brands	NZX: RBD	New Zealand	
RUA Bioscience	NZX: RUA		
Ryman Healthcare	NZX: RYM	New Zealand	
Sanford Limited	NZX: SAN	New Zealand	
Scales Corporation	NZX: SCL	New Zealand	
Scott Technology	NZX: SCT	New Zealand	
Smiths City	NZX: SCY	New Zealand	
Solution Dynamics	NZX: SDL		
Seeka Kiwifruit Industries	NZX: SEK	New Zealand	
SkyCity Entertainment Group	NZX: SKC	New Zealand	
Skellerup	NZX: SKL	New Zealand	
Serko	NZX: SKO	New Zealand	
Sky Network Television	NZX: SKT	New Zealand	
Synlait	NZX: SML	New Zealand	
SMW Group	NZX: SMW		
Southern Charter Financial Group	NZX: SNC		
Stride Property & Stride Investment Management	NZX: SPG	New Zealand	
Spark New Zealand	NZX: SPK	New Zealand	
South Port New Zealand	NZX: SPN	New Zealand	
Smartpay Holdings	NZX: SPY	New Zealand	
Steel & Tube	NZX: STU	New Zealand	
Summerset Group	NZX: SUM	New Zealand	
Third Age Health Services	NZX: TAH		
City of London Investment Trust	NZX: TCL	The United Kingdom	
Templeton Emerging Markets Investment Trust	NZX: TEM	The United Kingdom	
T&G Global	NZX: TGG	New Zealand	
Tourism Holdings	NZX: THL	New Zealand	
MOVe Logistics Group	NZX: TLL		
Telstra	NZX: TLS	Australia	
Tilt Renewables	NZX: TLT	New Zealand	
Smartshares NZ Top 10 ETF	NZX: TNZ	New Zealand	
Trustpower	NZX: TPW	New Zealand	
Turners Automotive Group	NZX: TRA	New Zealand	
TruScreen Limited	NZX: TRU	New Zealand	
Smartshares Total World ETF	NZX: TWF	New Zealand	
Smartshares Total World (NZD Hedged) ETF	NZX: TWH	New Zealand	
Tower Insurance	NZX: TWR	New Zealand	
Smartshares US Equities ESG ETF	NZX: USA	New Zealand	
Smartshares US 500 ETF	NZX: USF	New Zealand	
Smartshares US Large Growth ETF	NZX: USG	New Zealand	
Smartshares US Mid Cap ETF	NZX: USM	New Zealand	
Smartshares US Small Cap ETF	NZX: USS	New Zealand	
Smartshares US Large Value ETF	NZX: USV	New Zealand	
Vector	NZX: VCT	New Zealand	
Vista Group International	NZX: VGL	New Zealand	
Vital Healthcare Property Trust	NZX: VHP	New Zealand	
Vital Limited	NZX: VTL	New Zealand	
WasteCo	NZX: WCO		
Westpac	NZX: WBC	Australia	
Wellington Drive Technologies	NZX: WDT	New Zealand	
Winton Land	NZX: WIN		
The Warehouse Group	NZX: WHS	New Zealand	

== Former constituents ==
Stock name	Ex Symbol	Date Listed	Date De-listed	Reasoning	Notes
Augusta Capital	AUG	11 December 2006	21 August 2020	Acquired by Centuria Capital	
Seadragon Limited	SEA	24 October 1986	29 June 2020	Corporate decision	
Finzsoft Solutions Limited	FIN	28 December 2000	6 May 2020	Acquired by Silverlake Axis Limited	
CBL Corporation Limited	CBL	13 October 2015	1 November 2019	Liquidation/Receivership	
Future Mobility Solutions Limited	FMS	10 July 1994	30 October 2019	Corporate decision	
Mercantile Investment Company Limited	MVT	1 July 2015	21 October 2019	Acquired by Sandon Capital Investments	
ASB Capital Limited	ASBPA	12 November 2002	16 May 2019	Acquired by Commonwealth Bank (Perpetual Preference Shares redeemed)	
Trade Me Group Limited	TME	13 December 2011	8 May 2019	Acquired by Titan AcquisitionCo New Zealand Limited	
Orion Health Group Limited	OHE	26 November 2011	28 March 2019	Acquired by Grafton Health Holdings Limited.	
SLI Systems Limited	SLI	16 May 2013	10 January 2019	Acquired by ESW Holding Inc.	
Windflow Technology Limited	WTL	12 February 2003	28 November 2018	Corporate decision	
Chow Group Limited	CGL	7 March 2016	29 June 2018	Corporate decision	
Xero Limited	XRO	1 June 2007	31 January 2018	Corporate decision	
Opus International Consultants Limited	OIC	30 October 2007	10 January 2018	Acquired by WSP Global	
Fliway Group Ltd	FLI	9 April 2015	4 January 2018	Acquired by Yang Kee Logistics	
Airwork Holding Limited	AWK	19 December 2013	15 November 2017	Acquired by Rifa Jair Company	
G3 Group Limited	GGL	17 December 2016	20 October 2017	Low amount of trading	
The European Investment Trust plc	EUT	4 October 2000	19 September 2017	Corporate decision	
JPMorgan Japanese Investment Trust plc	JFJ	29 May 2000	4 September 2017	Low amount of trading	
G3 Group Limited	GGL	17 December 2016	18 October 2017	Corporate decision	
Intueri Education Group Limited	IQE	8 May 2014	16 October 2017	Liquidation/Receivership	
Tenon Limited	TEN	22 March 1996	31 July 2017	Corporate decision	
Ex-PPL Limited	PPL	6 September 2004	8 June 2017	Liquidation/Receivership	
Wynyard Group Ltd	WYN	19 July 2013	31 May 2017	Liquidation/Receivership	
Chatham Rock Phosphate Limited	CRP	11 June 2006	15 March 2017	Acquired by Antipodes Gold Limited	
Hellaby Holdings Ltd	HBY	31 March 1994	8 March 2017	Acquired by Bapcor Finance Pty Ltd	
APN News & Media	APN	21 June 2004	21 February 2017	Low amount of trading.	
OceanaGold Corporation	OCG	19 June 2007	31 December 2016	Corporate decision	
Wellington Merchants	KRK	11 May 2001	11 November 2016	Acquired by Mercantile Investment Company	
Pan Pacific Petroleum NL	PPP	14 January 2002	13 October 2016	Low amount of trading	
Nuplex Industries	NPX	2 February 1967	13 September 2016	Acquired by Allnex	
Speirs Group	SGL	28 July 2003	29 July 2016	Corporate decision	
Pacific Brands Limited	PBG	4 February 2004	18 July 2016	Acquired by HanesBrands.	
Stride Property	STR	16 August 2010	12 July 2016	Restructured into Stride Prop & Stride Invest Mgmt Limited	
Coats Group	COA	28 June 1991	24 June 2016	Low amount of trading	
Cleanaway Waste Management	CWY	25 July 2006	23 June 2016	Corporate decision	
Diligent Corporation	DIL	12 December 2007	14 April 2016	Acquired by Insight Venture Partners	
Pulse Energy	PLE	26 November 2007	9 February 2016	Acquired by Buller Electricity	
Horizon Energy Distribution	HED	20 March 1995	28 July 2015	Acquired by Eastern Bay Energy Trust	
Bathurst Resources	BRL	21 June 2013	3 July 2015	Corporate decision	
Asian Total Return Trust Company plc	ATR	28 November 1994	8 May 2015	Low amount of trading	
Goodman Fielder	GFF	19 December 2005	19 March 2015	Acquired by Wilmar International and First Pacific	
Acurity Health Group	ACY	9 June 2001	9 January 2015	Acquired by Connor Healthcare Limited	
Lyttelton Port Company Limited	LPC	7 May 1996	7 November 2014	Acquired by Christchurch City Holdings	
Cue Energy Resources Limited	CUE	12 October 2009	29 August 2014	Low amount of trading	
GuocoLeisure Limited	GLL	3 February 1970	27 June 2014	Low amount of trading	
Cynotech Holdings Limited	CYT	25 July 2000	13 September 2013	Liquidation/Receivership	
New Image Group	NEW	5 October 2000	22 May 2013	Acquired by New Image Trustee Limited	
New Zealand Wool Services International	WSI	5 March 2004	22 March 2013	Acquired by WSI Holdings Pty Ltd	
Satara Co-Operative Group Limited	SAT	13 December 2004	14 March 2013	Acquired by EastPack Limited	
New Zealand Experience Limited	NZE	12 November 1991	28 February 2013	Acquired by Rangatira Investments	
L&M Energy Limited	LME	1 November 2011	6 February 2013	Acquired by New Dawn Energy Limited	
NZ Farming Systems Uruguay Limited	NZS	1 December 2007	6 December 2012	Acquired by Olam International	
Fisher & Paykel Appliances Holding Limited	FPA	11 December 2001	27 November 2012	Acquired by Haier New Zealand Investment Company Limited	
AMP Investments' World Index Fund	WIN	8 June 1997	30 July 2012	Low amount of trading	
Independent News & Media PLC	INP	11 November 1996	22 June 2012	Corporate decision.	
Pike River Coal Limited	PRC	20 July 2007	24 February 2012	Acquired by Solid Energy New Zealand Limited	
Charlie's Group Limited	CHA	1 January 1983	16 September 2011	Acquired by Asahi Beverages New Zealand Limited	
TAG Pacific Limited	TPC	9 May 1989	15 July 2007	Corporate decision	
Oyster Bay Marborough Vinyards Limited	OBV	14 November 2003	17 February 2011	Acquired by Delegat's Wine Estate Limited	
Canterbury Building Society	CBS	7 August 2004	16 December 2010	Acquired by Marac Finance and the Southern Cross Building Society	
AFFCO Holdings	AFF	5 January 1995	3 November 2010	Acquired by Talley's Group	
VTL Group	VTL	11 January 2000	20 September 2010	Liquidation/Receivership	
Capital Properties New Zealand	CNZ	1 December 1998	15 April 2010	Corporate decision	
National Australia Bank	NAB	21 December 1992	1 December 2009	Low amount of trading	
Lion Nathan Limited	LNN	1 January 1981	28 October 2009	Acquired by Kirin	
ABN Amro Equity Derivatives New Zealand	AAD	10 September 2008	3 March 2009	Corporate decision	
Mr Chips Holdings Limited	MCH	18 September 1993	23 October 2008	Acquired by Simplot	
Vix International Limited	VIX	1 June 1997	30 June 2008	Acquired by Vix Holdings Limited	
MediaWorks NZ Limited	MWL	29 July 2004	15 October 2007	Acquired by HT Media	
Kidicorp Group Limited	KID	12 December 2001	3 October 2007	Acquired by Positive Educare Limited	
Veda Advantage Limited	VEA	30 September 1998	10 July 2007	Acquired by VA Australia Finance Pty Ltd.	
Oceana Gold Limited	OGL	10 March 2004	19 June 2007	Restructured in to OceanaGold Corporation Limited	
42 Below Limited	FTB	15 October 2003	21 December 2006	Acquired by Barcardi New Zealand Holdings Limited	
Mike Pero Mortgages Limited	MPM	24 May 2004	25 September 2006	Corporate decision	
Repco Corporation Limited	RCP	7 November 2003	3 February 2006	Low amount of trading	
Sky City Leisure Limited	SLL	1 January 1995	30 June 2004	Acquired by Skycity Entertainment Group	
AXA Asia Pacific Holdings Limited	AXA	8 October 1996	31 March 2006	Low amount of trading	
Amcor	AMC	28 August 1969	16 December 2005	Corporate decision	
Coles Myer Limited	CML	1 January 1992	25 November 2005	Low amount of trading	
Wrightson Limited	WRI	19 November 1993	7 October 2005	Acquired by Pyne Gould Guinness.	
Ports of Auckland	POA	1 October 1993	27 July 2005	Acquired by Auckland Council	
Nuhaka Farm Forestry Fund	NUH	21 December 1973	30 June 2005	Corporate decision	
Cue Energy Resources Limited	CUE	29 June 1981	27 May 2005	Corporate decision	
Vertex Group Holdings Limited	VTX	1 July 2002	27 May 2005	Acquired by Masthead Equities Limited	
Aberdeen New Dawn Investment Trust Plc	ABN	2 May 1989	30 July 2004	Corporate decision	
Shotover Jet Limited	SJL	1 October 1993	7 May 2004	Acquired by Ngai Tahu Holdings	
BHP Billiton Limited	BHP	13 August 1885	30 April 2004	Corporate decision	
AMP Reset Preferred Securities Trust	AMK	29 October 2002	8 January 2004	Corporate decision	
Viking Industries Limited	VKI	31 December 1984	9 December 2003	Corporate decision	
Harvey Norman Holdings Limited	HVN	1 December 2001	4 December 2003	Corporate decision	
Amity Oil	AYO	6 May 1997	27 March 2003	Low amount of trading	
Arthur Barnett	ARB	1 January 1963	21 March 2003	Acquired by Belwash Holdings Limited	
Bendon Group Limited	BEN	1 December 1981	22 April 2002	Acquired by Pacific Retail	
Baycorp Holdings Limited	BCH	1 June 1986	17 December 2001	Acquired by Data Advantage	
AMP Diversified Property Trust	ADT	15 June 1998	9 July 2001	Low amount of trading	
Acma Engineering and Construction Group	ACX	26 April 1990	1 December 2000	Corporate decision	
Nobilo Wines	NWL	18 December 1998	7 August 2000	Acquired by BRL Hardy Ltd	
Adelaide Brighton	ABT	31 May 1962	24 October 1997	Corporate decision	
Pacific Beef Ltd	PBF	31 December 1991	4 October 1996	Acquired by Janz Investments Ltd	
BNZ Finance	BNZ	7 February 1966	17 April 1996	Acquired by National Australia Bank	
Dunbar Sloane and European Art Limited	DSL	1 November 1986	24 February 1995	Acquired by Guinness Peat Group	
Bank of New Zealand	BZL	1 March 1987	21 December 1992	Acquired by National Australia Bank	
UDC Finance Limited	UDC	1 April 1938	31 December 1980	Acquired by ANZ Bank New Zealand	
Snowy River Gold Dredging Limited	-	28 September 1940	26 January 1960	Liquidation/Receivership	
The New Zealand Investment Trust Limited	-	23 February 1933	1 April 1938	Acquired by United Dominions Corporation Finance Limited	
