= List of South Island companies =

This is a list of major South Island, New Zealand based companies. To qualify a company must 1) have its registered office in the South Island; 2) a majority of its shareholders (51% or greater) must reside in the South Island; and 3) it must be listed on the NZX, NZAX or the Deloitte South Island Index and have an annual revenue of greater than NZ$100 million.

Company	Sector	NZX
Alliance Group	Agriculture	-
Allied Press	Publishing	-
Apple Fields Limited	Property development	NZX: APF
Arthur Barnett	Retail	-
Aurora Energy	Electricity distribution	-
BLIS Technologies	Biotechnology	NZX: BLT
Blue Sky Meats	Agriculture	-
Botry-Zen	Biotechnology	NZX: BOZ
Britten Motorcycle Company	Manufacturing	-
Canterbury Building Society	Financial services	NZX: CBS
Canterbury Television	Media	-
Cavotec MSL	Other	NZX: CCC
Christchurch Casino	Hospitality	-
Citibus	Transport	-
Connexionz	Technology	NZX: CNX
Ebos Group	Technology	NZX: EBO
Emersons	Food and beverage	-
Eurekster	Video game industry	-
Fergburger	Food and beverage	-
Foodstuffs	Retail	-
Fulton Hogan	Construction	-
Glenorchy Air	Transport	-
Griffin's Foods	Food and beverage	-
H & J Smith	Retail	-
KMD Brands	Retail	NZX: KMD
Leopard Coachlines	Transport	-
Longacre Press	Publishing	-
Lyttelton Port Company	Port	NZX: LPC
Macpac Outdoors	Manufacturing	-
McCashins Brewery	Food and beverage	-
Monteith's	Food and beverage	-
Mount Cook Group	Tourism and Transport	-
NZ Farming Systems Uruguay	Agriculture	NZX: NZS
NZSKI	Tourism	-
New Zealand Wool Services International	Primary	NZX: WSI
Nelson Building Society	Banking	-
New Zealand Midland Railway Company	Transport	-
New Zealand Natural	Hospitality	-
NZ Windfarms	Development	NZX: NWF
Night 'n Day	Retail	-
Orion New Zealand	Electricity distribution	-
Pacific Edge	Biotechnology	NZX: PEB
Particle Systems	Manufacturing	-
Passenger Transport (New Zealand)	Transport	-
PGG Wrightson	Agriculture	NZX: PGW
Plus SMS	Technology	NZX: PLS
Postie Plus Group	Retail	NZX: PPG
Property Finance Group	Financial services	NZX: PFG
Pyne Gould Corporation	Financial services	NZX: PGC
Radio Otago	Media	-
Red Bus	Transport	-
Ritchies Coachlines	Transport	-
Ryman Healthcare	Medicine	NZX: RYM
Salehoo	Technology	-
SBS Bank	Banking	-
Scott Technology	Technology	NZX: SCT
Silver Fern Farms	Agriculture	NZX: SFF
SLI Systems	Technology	-
Smiths City Group	Retail	NZX: SCY
South Canterbury Finance	Financial services	-
South Port New Zealand	Port	NZX: SPN
Straylight Studios	Video game industry	-
The National Property Trust	Development	NZX: NAP
The New Zealand Wine Company	Primary	NZX: NWC
Two Paddocks	Hospitality	-
Union Shipping Group	Transport	-
Widespread Energy	Energy	NZX: WEN
Widespread Portfolios	Mining	NZX: WID
Westland Milk Products	Manufacturing	-
Wests	Manufacturing	-
Windflow Technology	Technology	NZX: WTL
Whitcoulls	Retail	-
Whitestone Cheese	Food and beverage	-
Wigram Brewing company	Food and beverage	-
Wynn Williams & Co	Law	-

== See also ==
- List of companies of New Zealand
