= WDT =

WDT may refer to:

- Walt Disney Treasures, a Disney cartoon DVD series
- Wellington Drive Technologies, a company listed on the New Zealand Stock Exchange
- Watchdog timer, a computer hardware timing device
- West Drayton railway station, London (by National Rail station code)
- World Darts Trophy, a darts tournament played from 2002 to 2007
- WDT (New York City), a radio station licensed to the Shop Owners Radio Service from 1921 to 1923.
- West Digital Television, an Australian digital television network owned by Seven West Media and WIN Corporation
- Weiss Distribution Technique, a method used on espresso machine portafilters to evenly distribute coffee grounds
