= GeoOp =

Publicly listed New Zealand technology company

Geo Limited (formerly GeoOp Limited)
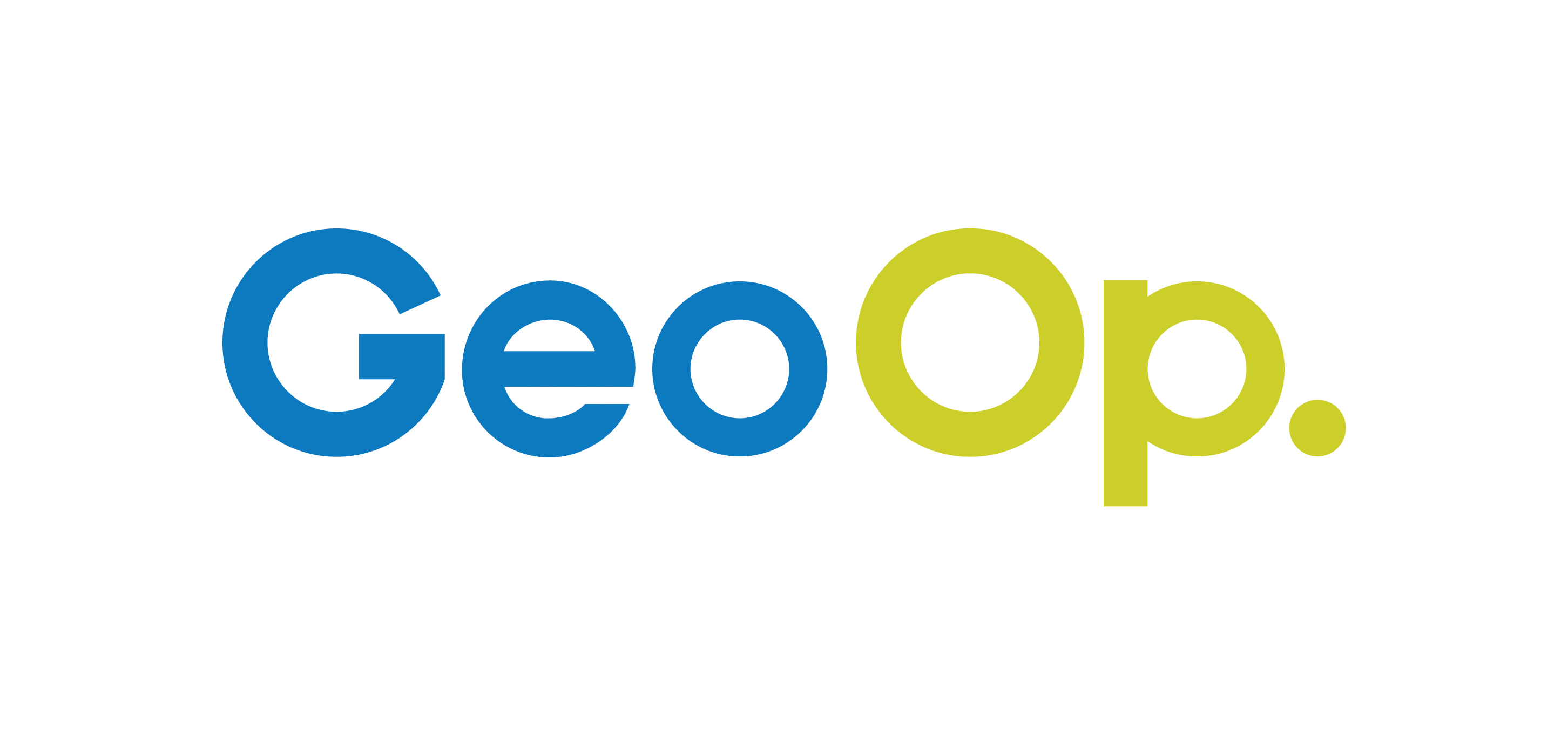
- Company type: Public (NZX: GEO)
- Industry: Technology
- Founded: 2009
- Founder: Nicholas Bartlett, Benjamin Goudie-Park, Simon Fraser, Brendan Cervin
- Headquarters: Sydney, Australia
- Areas served: Australia, NZ, UK, USA, Global
- Key people: Chairman - Roger Sharp, CEO - Tim Molloy, CFO - Peter Hynd, CRO - Scott Player, CTO - Minas Kamel,
- Products: GeoNext; GeoOp
- Owner: Public listing company (NZX)
- Number of employees: 40+
- Website: www.geoworkforcesolutions.com

Geo Limited (formerly GeoOp Limited) is a publicly listed company in New Zealand.

== Products ==
Geo operates two products:

1. GeoNext: In 2019, Geo launched GeoNext, its next generation platform and app, designed with a more modern interface and ease of use.
2. GeoOp: Its traditional product that it has been operating since launch.

Geo has over 15,000 customers that use their products to help manage their business.

Both products focus on helping trade, home and field service business owners. Functionality includes quoting, job management, Staff management and timesheets, invoicing and payments.

== History ==
GeoOp was founded in Auckland, New Zealand in 2009 by Nicholas Bartlett, Benjamin Goudie-Park, Simon Fraser, and Brendan Cervin. In 2010, the company opened an additional office in Sydney, Australia.

In 2011, GEO was awarded the Consensus Software Award for being the most innovative software product in Australia and New Zealand.

In early 2013, Leanne Graham, the former Country Manager of New Zealand-based accounting software company Xero, became GeoOp's new CEO. By mid 2013, GeoOp successfully raised 10 million in private funding. In the following October, GeoOp listed on the small-cap NZAX, becoming a public listed company.

In September 2014, Graham stood down as CEO to become an 'executive strategic adviser' to the company in the USA. The news was followed by an 11% drop in the share price. Anna Cicognani became acting CEO in February 2015.

Geo completed a $2.4m NZD capital raise in August 2015, to pursue growth opportunities in Australia.

In January 2015, GeoOp announced a distribution agreement with MyCloudCure for the United States and Canada.

In February 2020 Tim Molloy was appointed CEO.

In November 2020, Geo announced a capital raise of up to $2m. It was announced that "proceeds from the Raise are intended to be used for general working capital purposes as the Company accelerates its customer acquisition activity."
