= Phil&teds =

New Zealand baby products company

phil&teds is a manufacturer of strollers and other baby care products that are sold worldwide. The company is headquartered in Wellington, New Zealand.

== Awards and recognition ==
In 2015, phil&teds won a Red Dot design award for their ‘verve’ buggy and has also been nominated for other awards, including recognition from the internationally recognized Kind + Jugend Innovation Award and the American Chamber of Commerce - UPS Success & Innovation Awards.
