= Orion Health =

New Zealand healthcare software company

Orion Health Group
- Type: Private
- Industry: Health Software, SaaS, Cloud Software
- Founded: 1993; 33 years ago
- Founder: Ian McCrae
- Headquarters: Auckland, New Zealand
- Key people: Ian McCrae; Founder and Former CEO; Brad Porter; Current CEO; Sean Church; Current Chief Financial Officer
- Number of employees: 600+
- Website: http://www.orionhealth.com

Orion Health is a New Zealand-based global software company that delivers and sells healthcare software. It provides the software for healthcare providers (public healthcare and private healthcare organisations) from integration through to population health management and precision medicine.

With over 450 customers in 25 countries and 600 staff globally, its Amadeus software has been praised for its integrative capacity, and the ability to analyse data in real time.

== Overview ==
Founded by Ian McCrae in 1993, Orion has its head office in Grafton, Auckland, New Zealand. In 2022, after McCrae had held the position since its founding, Brad Porter was appointed as the company's new CEO.

Orion is involved with the development of Integrated Health Records branded as Integrated Digital Care Records in the British National Health Service and as Health Information Exchanges (HIEs) in the USA.

== History ==
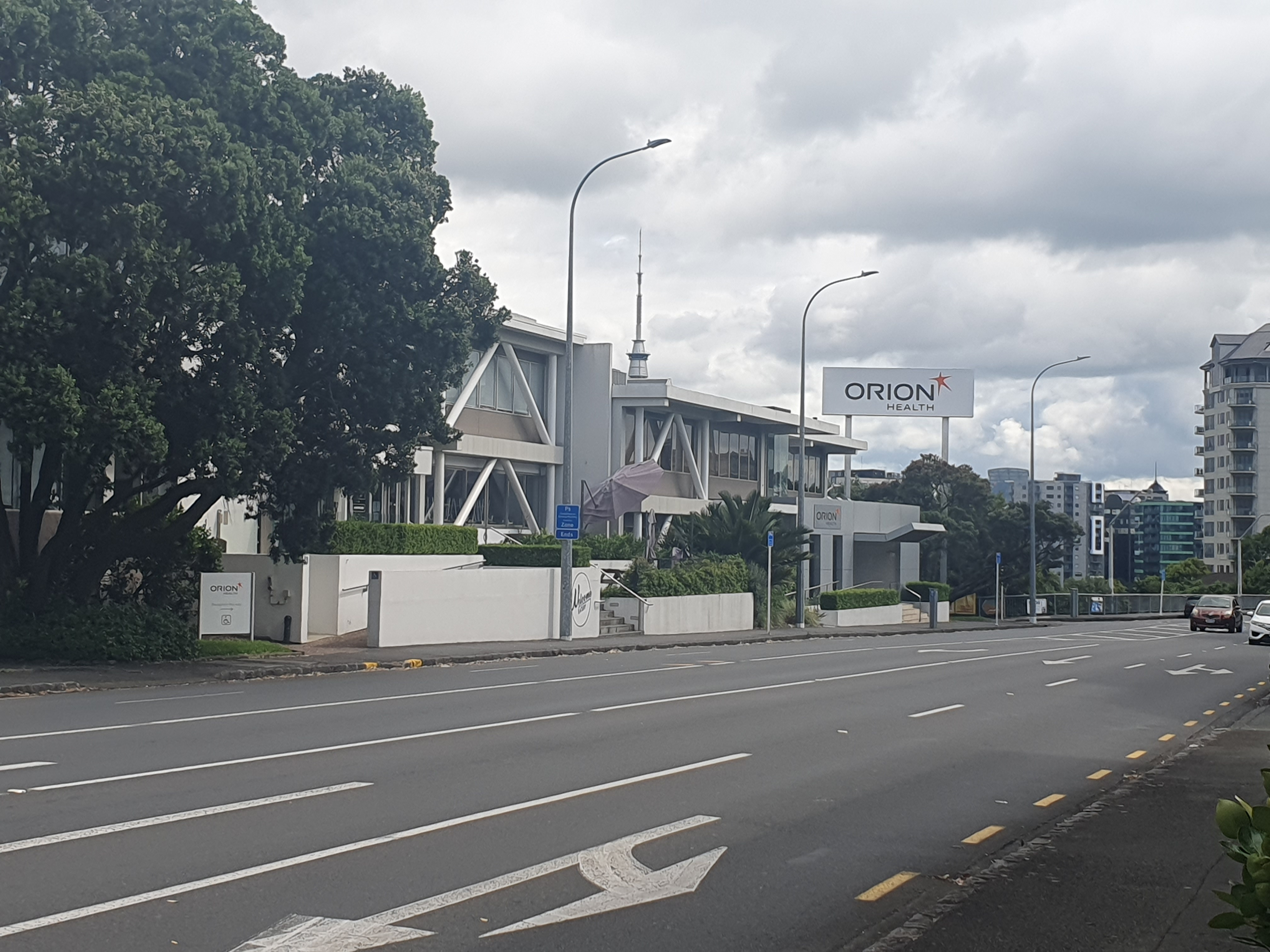
The Orion Health headquarters in Auckland, New Zealand

After being a privately owned company for over twenty years, the firm became a public organization on 26 November 2014 when it listed on the NZX.

In 2016, it partnered with the University of Auckland and the Waitemata District Health Board to develop one of New Zealand's largest data science research initiatives called Precision Driven Health The following year, the partnership received the Research and Business Partnership Award at the KiwiNet Research Commercialisation Awards.

In April 2017, as Orion had not posted a profit for three years and market analysts suggested it was in serious trouble, the company said it was looking for a capital injection from new investors. In February 2018, Orion Health launched a cloud-based Rhapsody integration on Amazon Web Services (AWS).

In March 2019 shares were compulsorily acquired by McCrae for $1.224 per share, a large drop from their $5.70 IPO share price causing widespread losses to early investors. Orion was then de-listed from the Australian Stock Exchange and the New Zealand Stock Exchange, becoming again a privately held company.

In the same year, the firm delivered the first Health Information Exchange (HIE) in the Middle East. The system allows health providers to view and store data for more than 50 million people. This is expected to be the "world's largest" HIE containing data from approximately 5,000 private and government healthcare providers.

In April 2025, Healwell AI completes the purchase of the company.

== Locations ==
Orion Health has been headquartered in Auckland, New Zealand since its 1993 inception, with its current premises opened in 2010. In 2015 Orion Health chose the Scottsdale Airpark area for its North American operations centre.
