= IkeGPS =

ikeGPS Limited
- Company type: Public
- Traded as: NZX: IKE ASX IKE
- Industry: Telecommunications, Electric Utilities, Engineering, Mobile Resource Management, Government
- Founded: New Zealand (2014)
- Headquarters: Colorado, United States
- Key people: Glenn Milnes - CEO
- Website: https://www.ikegps.com

ikeGPS Limited, sometimes stylized as IKE, is an American-based New Zealand company that provides services for measuring, modeling, and managing power and telecommunications assets.

== History ==
ikeGPS Limited's main business activity is selling systems aimed at assessing and deploying communications and electric utility networks. IKE is headquartered in Broomfield, Colorado, with offices in Wellington, New Zealand.

== Products ==
ikeGPS Limited provides products that records geodata of multiple targets along with corresponding photographs. This is intended to be done from a distance, which can be of assistance if the user is dealing with any hard-to-reach or dangerous target.

The Spike product, which is no longer available, used a phone camera, a laser-based system and mobile app software to capture location, height, width, and distance of any object with 1% accuracy.

== Applications ==
ikeGPS Limited's software and hardware are used by communications companies, such as AT&T and over 400 North American utilities for pole loading analysis, make-ready engineering, and associated networks. Its mobile products are deployed by transportation departments, local governments, by intelligence and defense groups and other organizations for emergency management and enterprise asset management.

== See also ==
- Geotagging
- Utility Pole Inspections
- Asset Management
- Remote Data Collection
- Joint Use Pole Audit
