= Peg Perego =

Italian childcare products company

Peg Perego is an Italian manufacturer of juvenile products (i.e., strollers, high chairs, car seats, children's ride-on toys). In addition to their home location in Italy, the company now has offices in Brazil, Canada, and the United States.

== History ==
In 1949, Giuseppe Pérego decided to design a baby carriage for his son. His neighbours were impressed and requested their own custom creations. Eventually, the carriages became so popular that he started a company. After carriages, Peg Perego's baby products have since expanded to include strollers, car seats, and high chairs.

In 1960, the company looked into a slightly more mature market: children's ride-on toys. Peg Perego designed and built plastic, pedal-operated children's riding vehicles. These toys have become more advanced, and the company now sells battery-powered John Deere, Polaris, Cub Cadet, Ducati, and Vespa ride-on toys for children.

== Popular culture ==
The Nanny Diaries: Scarlett Johansson pushes a Pliko P3 (Freestyle Mint)

== Awards ==
- Baby and Children's Product News: 2008 Readers’ Favorites Awards (3rd place-Carseats)
- Creative Child Magazine: 2007 Top Choice of the Year (Prima Pappa Best High Chair and Primo Viaggio SIP 30/30 Car Seat)
- Creative Child Magazine: 2007 Seal of Excellence (Pliko P3)
- Kind + Jugend Innovation Award: 2007 World of Mobile Baby (Skate)

== Recall ==
On 24 July 2012, the U.S. Consumer Product Safety Commission, in cooperation with Peg Perego USA Inc. of Fort Wayne, Indiana, announced a voluntary recall of about 223,000 strollers due to a risk of entrapment and strangulation.

== World distributors ==
- Austria – Peter Herzog Handelsagentur
- Bosnia and Herzegovina – Karaka Promet d.o.o.
- Iran – NiNi Darya Faraz Trad Co
- Czech Republic – Vispa Náchod s.r.o.
- Chile – Ferdel Chile S.A.
- Germany – Marketing und Vertrieb
- Holland – Oku Business Partners
- Israel – Pupik Toys LTD.
- Lebanon – Gebran Geahchan and Sons S.A.L
- Poland – Agnes-Im
- Russia – Bambini LTD.
- Slovenia – Mami d.o.o.
- Spain – Toystecnic Postventa y Recambios
- Sweden – Innogame AS, Maki AS
- Ukraine – Alimpex Group, Peg Perego Ukraine
- United Kingdom – Mamas & Papas LTD.
