= Pushpay =

Australian software company

Pushpay Holdings Limited
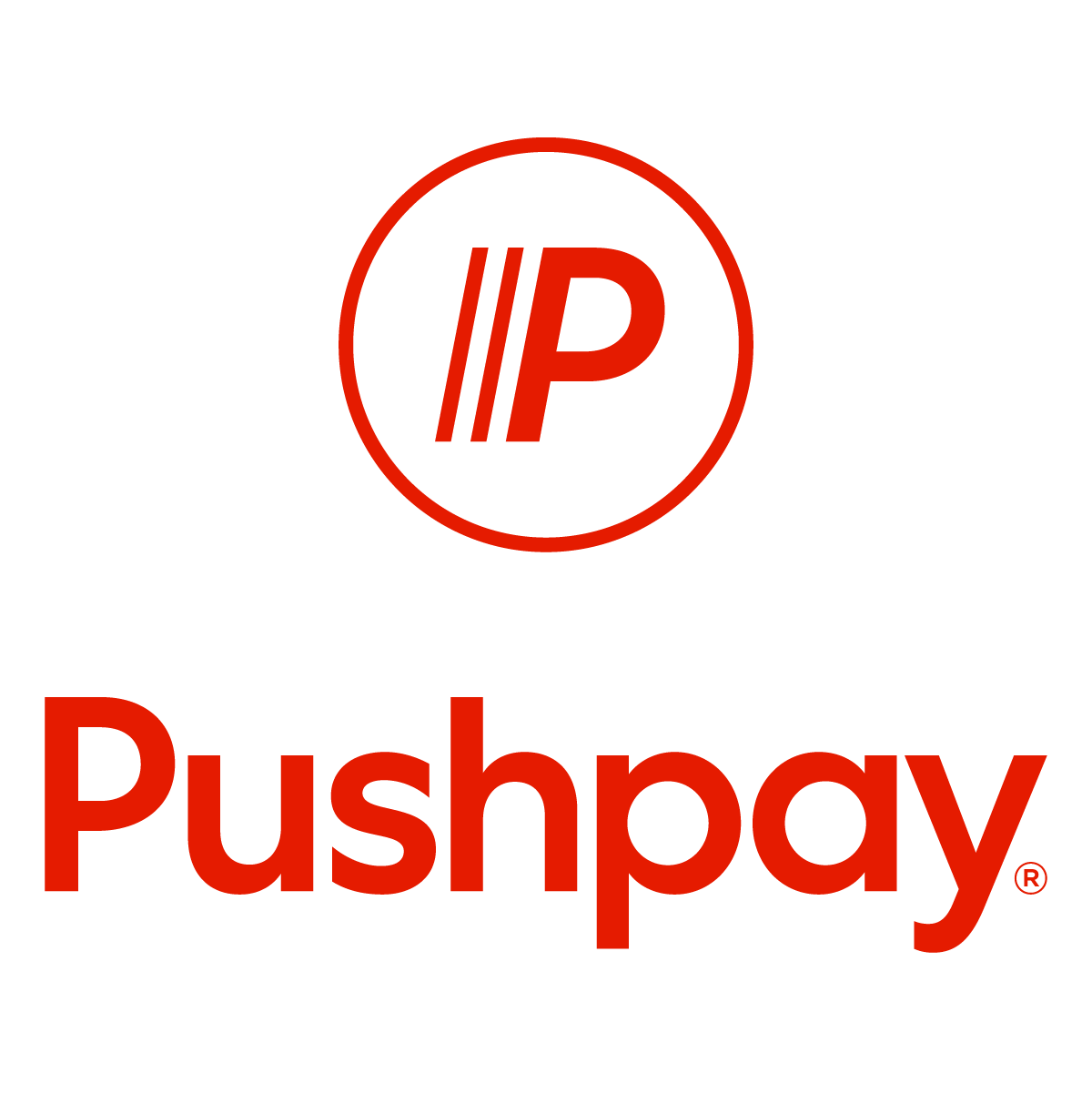
- Company type: Private
- Traded as: NZX: PPH; ASX: PPH
- Industry: Software as a Service
- Headquarters: Auckland, New Zealand | Redmond, Washington; Colorado Springs, Colorado, US
- Key people: Kenny Wyatt, CEO
- Products: Mobile payments, donor management system and a church management system
- Revenue: US$181.1 million as at 31 March 2021
- Number of employees: Approximately 405 across the USA and New Zealand
- Website: https://pushpay.com/

Pushpay Holdings Limited, known as Pushpay, is a mobile giving, donor management, and church management software company serving faith-based and nonprofit organizations in the United States. In 2014 the company was publicly listed on the New Zealand Stock Exchange (NZX), and subsequently listed on the Australian Securities Exchange (ASX) on 12 October 2016 under the ticker code PPH, before being taken private in 2023 following an acquisition by Sixth Street Partners and BGH Capital.

== History ==
Pushpay was founded in 2011 by Chris Heaslip and Eliot Crowther in New Zealand. Heaslip was CEO until his resignation in 2019.

Molly Matthews, based in the company’s Seattle office, became CEO in 2021 following the interim leadership of board member Bruce Gordon. She transitioned to a Senior Advisor role in 2025 when Kenny Wyatt was appointed CEO.

In November 2016, Pushpay acquired Bluebridge's church app–related business.

Pushpay joined the NZX50 Index in December 2017, and the ASX All Ordinaries Index in March 2018. The company was added to the S&P/ASX All Technology Index when it launched in February 2020.

In December 2019, Pushpay acquired Church Community Builder, a U.S.-based church management software provider, for US$87.5 million. Independent reporting highlighted the acquisition as significantly expanding Pushpay’s U.S. customer base.

In September 2020, the company released ChurchStaq, a software suite integrating mobile giving, donor management, and church management capabilities.

In May 2023, Pushpay was delisted from the NZX and ASX following its acquisition by Sixth Street Partners and BGH Capital.
