= Grove Mill =

Coordinates: 41.5171°S 173.7990°E

Grove Mill winery was established in 1988 in the Marlborough wine region of New Zealand, and is now owned by California-based Foley Wines.

The winery was founded by group of local grape growers and wine enthusiasts who purchased the Malt house (The Mill), a historic landmark in Grovetown, Blenheim, and transformed it into a 150 tonne winery. By 1993, demand for their wine outgrew production capacity and Grove Mill underwent expansion. 18 hectares of land was purchased west of Blenheim, giving the winery the capability of producing nearly 70,000 cases of wine per year. Although it can produce 70,000 cases per year, normal production is around 60,000.

In 2006, Grove Mill became the world's first carbon neutral winery.
