= Blis Technologies =

New Zealand biotechnology company

Blis Technologies Limited
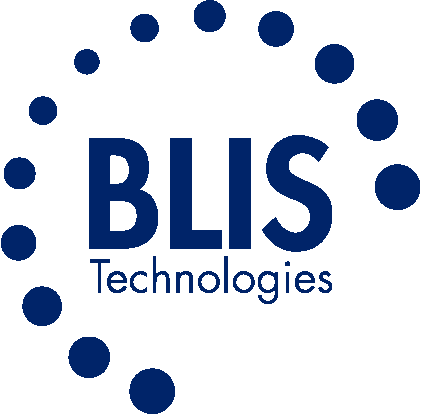
- Type: Public
- Traded as: NZX: BLT
- Industry: Biotechnology
- Predecessor: Tarn Holdings Limited
- Founded: 2000
- Headquarters: Dunedin, New Zealand
- Key people: Prof. John Tagg (Founder), Brian Watson (CEO)
- Website: blis.co.nz

Blis Technologies Limited is a biotechnology company that manufactures advanced probiotics for the mouth and throat.

== History ==
The company's founder, John Tagg, has conducted research investigating the amount of bacteria present within a diet and their effects on personal hygiene. After contracting rheumatic fever at age 12, Tagg later decided, as a young microbiology student, to seek an effective way of countering the disease. In August 2000, he left his academic position at the University of Otago to launch Blis Technologies. Two years later the first oral probiotic – ThroatGuard, containing BLISK12 – was marketed. A wide variety of products have been subsequently developed, with many now sold internationally in lozenges, gum, powder and other forms.

Blis' products have been sold globally, while the company itself is headquartered in Dunedin, New Zealand. Blis Technologies is publicly listed on the New Zealand Stock Exchange.

== Awards and innovation ==
Blis Technologies hold the world-first patent for their strain of the oral bacteria, Streptococcus salivarius, claimed to be beneficial for humans, which won the 2010 Frost & Sullivan award for Global Entrepreneurship.

The company was also acknowledged by multinational Deloitte as the Fastest Growing Mature Business in New Zealand for 2016.

== Recent developments ==
A secondary product to ThroatGuard, containing BLIS K12 in a powder form suitable for children and infants, was developed and branded ToddlerProtect.

A third product was later rolled in 2006, TravelGuard, suitable for travelers exposed to airborne germs.

In September 2005, Blis announced the launch of FreshBreath, aimed with promoting and maintaining fresher breath.

Blis Technologies introduced a new probiotic to the New Zealand market in October 2012, focused on fighting the bacteria associated with tooth decay and periodontal disease. The BLIS M18 (Streptococcis salivarius) strain was developed and launched into the market under the brand name HealthyTeeth. Several clinical trials found BLIS M18 to promote the health of the oral cavity.

In 2011, Blis K12 received GRAS (generally recognised as safe) status from the United States Food and Drug Administration, enabling the probiotic to be used as a food additive.
