= S&P/NZX 50 =

New Zealand's stock market index

S&P/NZX 50 Index
- Operator: NZX, S&P Dow Jones Indices
- Exchanges: NZX
- Constituents: 50
- Type: Large capitalisation
- Website: S&P/NZX 50 Index

The S&P/NZX 50 Index is the main stock market index in New Zealand. It comprises the 50 biggest stocks by free-float market capitalisation trading on the New Zealand Stock Market (NZSX). The calculation of the free-float capitalisation excludes blocks of shares greater than 20% and blocks between 5% and 20% that are considered strategic.

The index was introduced as the NZSX 50 Index in March 2003 and replaced the NZSE 40 Index as the headline index. It was renamed the NZX 50 Index in late 2005. The NZSE 40 Capital Index replaced the Barclays index in 1992, although the Barclays index is still compiled by the NZX but not made widely available. In 2015, the index was renamed to S&P/NZX 50 Index reflecting a 'strategic partnership' between NZX and S&P Dow Jones Indices (S&P DJI). As part of the partnership, S&P DJI has assumed responsibility for calculating, publishing distributing all NZX indices.

== Constituents ==
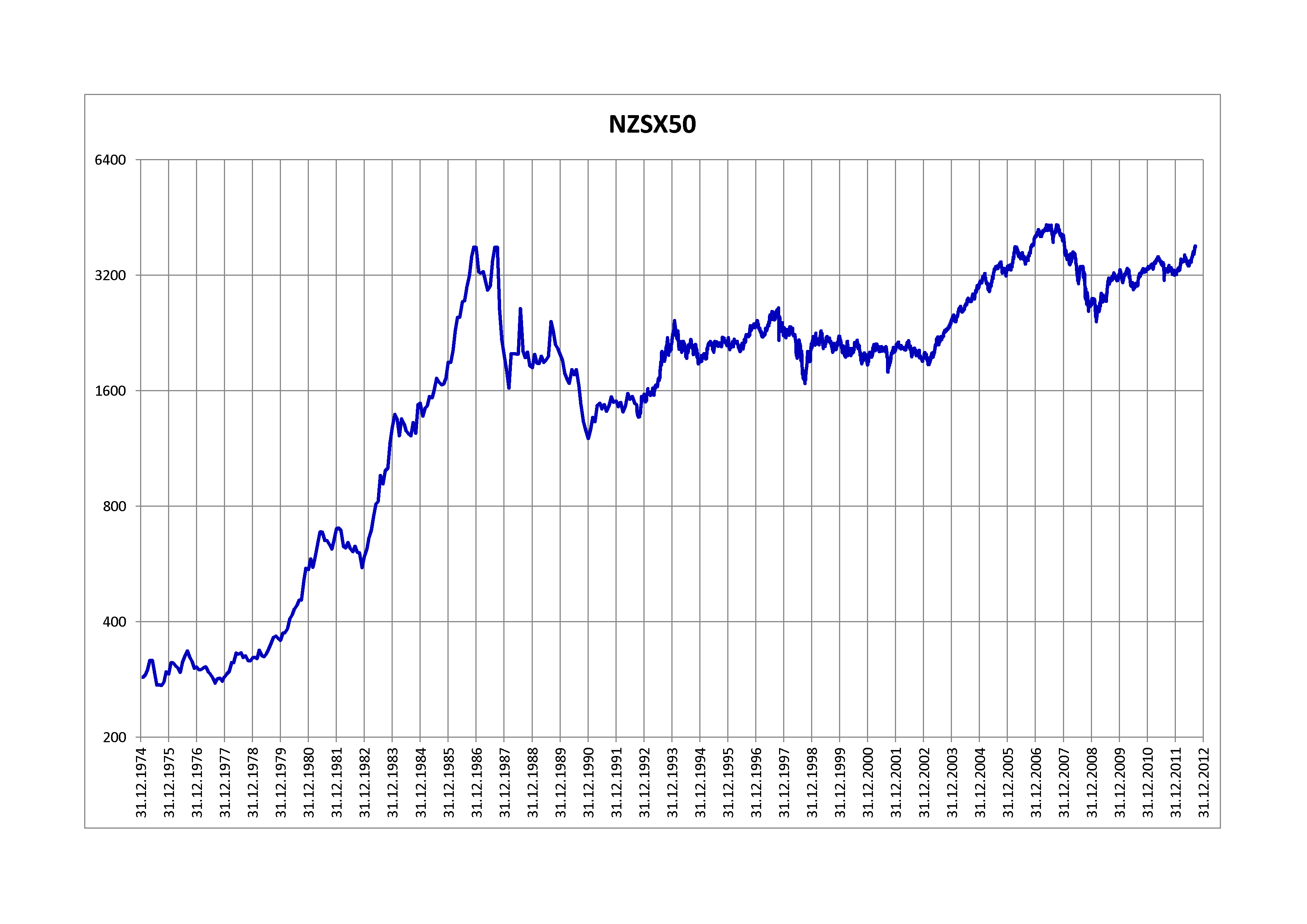
NZX 50 Index 1974–2012

Ticker symbol	Company	Sector	Added
AIA	Auckland International Airport Limited	Airport Services	-
AIR	Air New Zealand Limited	Airlines	-
ANZ	ANZ Group Holdings Limited	Diversified Banks	-
ARG	Argosy Property Limited	Diversified REITs	-
ATM	The a2 Milk Company Limited	Packaged Foods & Meats	-
BGP	Briscoe Group Limited	Specialty Stores	2025-06-23
CEN	Contact Energy Limited	Electric Utilities	-
CHI	Channel Infrastructure NZ Limited	Oil and Gas Refining	2023-03-20
CNU	Chorus Limited	Alternative Carriers	-
EBO	Ebos Group Limited	Health Care Distributors	-
FBU	Fletcher Building Limited	Construction Materials	-
FPH	Fisher & Paykel Healthcare Corporation Limited	Health Care Equipment & Services	-
FRW	Freightways Group Limited	Air Freight & Logistics	-
FSF	Fonterra Shareholders' Fund	Packaged Foods & Meats	-
GNE	Genesis Energy Limited	Electric Utilities	-
GNZ	Goodman NZ Ltd & Goodman Property Services Ltd	Diversified REITs	-
GTK	Gentrack Group Limited	Application Software	2023-12-18
HGH	Heartland Group Holdings Limited	Diversified Banks	-
HLG	Hallenstein Glasson Holdings Limited	Consumer Cyclical	2023-05-11
IFT	Infratil Limited	Electric Utilities	-
IPL	Investore Property Limited	Retail REITs	-
KMD	KMD Brands Limited	Specialty Stores	-
KPG	Kiwi Property Group Limited	Retail REITs	-
MCY	Mercury NZ Limited	Electric Utilities	-
MEL	Meridian Energy Limited	Renewable Electricity	-
MFT	Mainfreight Limited	Air Freight & Logistics	-
NPH	Napier Port Holdings Limited	Marine Ports & Services	2025-07-08
NZX	NZX Limited	Financial Exchanges & Data	-
OCA	Oceania Healthcare Limited	Health Care Facilities	-
PCT	Precinct Properties NZ & Precinct Properties Investments Ltd	Office REITs	-
PFI	Property for Industry Limited	Industrial REITs	-
POT	Port of Tauranga Limited	Marine Ports & Services	-
RYM	Ryman Healthcare Limited	Health Care Facilities	-
SAN	Sanford Limited	Packaged Foods & Meats	2017-03-20
SCL	Scales Corporation Limited	Packaged Foods & Meats	-
SKC	SkyCity Entertainment Group Limited	Casinos & Gaming	-
SKL	Skellerup Holdings Limited	Industrial Machinery	-
SKO	Serko Limited	Application Software	2020-09-21
SKT	Sky Network Television Limited	Cable & Satellite	-
SPG	Stride Property Ltd & Stride Investment Management Ltd	Diversified REITs	-
SPK	Spark New Zealand Limited	Integrated Telecommunication Services	-
SUM	Summerset Group Holdings Limited	Health Care Facilities	-
THL	Tourism Holdings Limited	Tourism	-
TRA	Turners Automotive Group Limited	Automotive	2023-12-18
TWR	Tower Limited	Property & Casualty Insurance	2024-10-22
VCT	Vector Limited	Multi-Utilities	-
VGL	Vista Group International Limited	Application Software	-
VHP	Vital Healthcare Property Trust	Health Care REITs	-
VSL	Vulcan Steel Limited	Metals & Mining	2022-12-19
WBC	Westpac Banking Corporation	Diversified Banks	-

== See also ==
- List of companies of New Zealand - includes older list of NZX 50 companies
