= Wigram Beer =

Brewery in Wigram, Christchurch, New Zealand

Wigram Brewing Co. is a brewery in Wigram, Christchurch, New Zealand that was established in 2003.

Wigram Brewing Co. is member of the Brewers Guild of New Zealand. Its Ace Smokey Porter won a gold medal in the "Stout & Porter" category of the 2023 New Zealand Beer Awards.

== See also ==
- List of breweries in New Zealand
