= Tower Insurance =

New Zealand insurance company

TOWER Limited
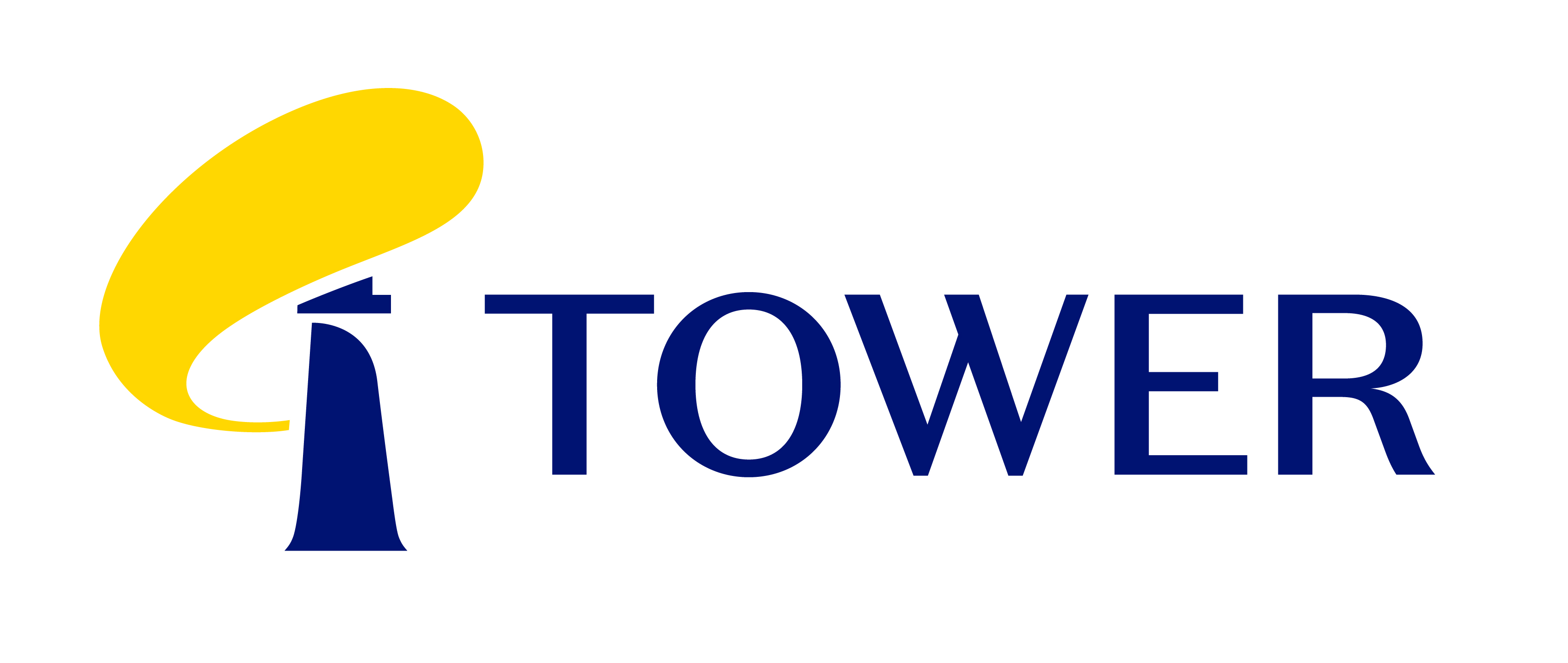
- Type: Publicly listed company
- Traded as: NZX: TWR; S&P/NZX 50 component
- Industry: Insurance
- Founded: 1869; 157 years ago
- Headquarters: Auckland, New Zealand
- Key people: Naomi Ballantyne, Chair; Paul Johnston, Chief Executive Officer
- Products: House, contents, car, boat, travel, business
- Revenue: NZ$594.3 million (FY25)
- Net income: NZ$83.7 million (FY25) (2026)
- Website: www.tower.co.nz

Tower is a New Zealand and Pacific Islands insurance company that provides car, home, contents, business, boat, pet, travel and other general insurance.

== History ==
In 1869 the New Zealand Government provided the capital for the creation of the New Zealand Government Life Insurance Department (better known simply as Government Life).

Uniquely (in New Zealand), it used custom postage stamps, first issued in 1891, due to a dispute with the New Zealand Post and Telegraph Department over the correct calculation of postage costs. All issues featured lighthouses, either in abstract designs or specific lighthouses from around New Zealand. New designs were issued in 1905, 1947 (surcharged at the time of decimalisation in 1967), 1969, and 1981. Use of these stamps was withdrawn in 1989.

Government Life became Tower Corporation in 1987, at a time when several New Zealand government departments and organisations were being corporatised or converted into state-owned enterprises. Three years later, ownership of Tower was transferred to policyholders as the business was mutualised. Being a mutual insurance company caused difficulties in raising capital and nine years later, in 1999, Tower demutualised and listed on the Australian and New Zealand stock exchanges. Seven years later, in November 2006, Tower's Australian and New Zealand operations were separated, with the approval of its shareholders and the high court. Today, Tower is still shareholder-owned and listed on the NZX and ASX.

=== Diversification from plain life insurance ===
In 1989, Tower bought the National Insurance Company of New Zealand Limited. Founding its head office in Dunedin in 1873, the National Insurance Company had now grown its operations throughout the world. National Insurance had bought the failed Standard Insurance Company Limited in 1961. These businesses provided Tower's fire and general insurance divisions.

In 2012, Tower sold its medical insurance (Tower Medical Insurance Limited) and its investment (Tower Managed Funds Limited) divisions. This was followed in 2013 with the sale of Tower's life insurance business.

In line with many other New Zealand insurance companies, Tower announced on 10 April 2013 that it was moving away from full replacement house policies towards nominated sum insured covers, attributing this change to international reinsurers.

In August 2021, Tower began offering boat insurance policies online. In August 2022, Tower launched Contract works – Renovation cover, which covers theft of materials and damage during house renovation work.

=== Digital transformation ===
Tower's signature self-service digital platform, My Tower, was first launched in New Zealand in late 2019. In March 2022 Tower launched My Tower in Fiji. My Tower is the first insurance online portal in the Pacific that allows people to pay their insurance premiums, lodge a claim, get a quote, update their personal details, purchase a policy and view their insurance policies. By March 2023, My Tower was available in all Pacific island countries in which Tower operates.

In June 2021, Tower launched Quick Quote, an online quoting tool that automatically pulls publicly available sources and pre-populates information to cut down the number of questions asked of customers when sourcing an insurance quote. From the 2010s, Tower implemented a range of digital initiatives aimed at improving operational processes and customer service. These included investments in technology and data analytics to deliver insurance solutions and support customers and shareholders.

=== Risk-based pricing ===
Tower was the first New Zealand insurer to publicly introduce risk-based pricing for earthquakes in 2018, followed by inland flooding in 2021. In August 2025, Tower expanded its risk-based pricing and public property risk ratings to include landslide and sea-surge risks. By using address-level data, Tower can more closely align the natural-hazard component of premiums with the risks facing individual properties, reducing cross-subsidisation between customers. Customers can view their earthquake, flood, landslide and sea-surge risk ratings through Tower’s online home insurance quote process, providing greater transparency about how natural hazard risks are assessed.

=== Pacific Islands operations ===
Tower Pacific operates in Tonga, Samoa, American Samoa, the Cook Islands, and Fiji. Its Pacific operations hub, located in Suva, Fiji, employs more than 300 staff to support Tower's scalability across its markets. Tower has received industry recognition for its workplace practices, including awards related to diversity and employee engagement.

In November 2021, Tower announced it was taking complete ownership of its subsidiary National Pacific Insurance Limited (NPI) to streamline its New Zealand and Pacific operations. In August 2022, NPI began re-branding to Tower.

In October 2022, Tower began piloting a parametric insurance product, Cyclone Response Cover in Fiji, in collaboration with the United Nations Capital Development Fund (UNCDF). Cyclone Response Cover is now available to all customers in Fiji, Samoa and Tonga. In November 2025, Tower expanded its parametric insurance offering by launching Rainfall Response Cover as a pilot in Fiji for the 2025–2026 wet season. In August 2026, Tower made the product’s first payout, distributing FJ$27,050 to 278 customers in Kadavu following heavy rainfall.

In 2024, Tower celebrated 150 years of operation in the Pacific.

== Today ==
Tower operates across New Zealand and the Pacific Islands, providing personal lines and SME insurance for more than 327,000 customers as of 31 March 2026. The company is the only general insurer listed on the New Zealand Stock Exchange (NZX) and rejoined the NZX 50 Index in 2024.

In May 2026, Tower reported underlying net profit after tax of NZ$36.8 million and reported net profit after tax of NZ$22.9 million for the six months ended 31 March 2026.

Tower's head office is located in a 6 Green Star building on Fanshawe Street, Auckland.

Tower received Canstar’s Home & Contents Insurer of the Year award in 2024, 2025 and 2026. It also received Canstar Innovation Excellence Awards for its flood risk-rating tool in 2023 and its landslide and sea-surge risk-rating tool in 2026. In 2024, Tower received Excellence in Workplace Diversity, Equity and Inclusion Award at the 2024 New Zealand Insurance Industry Awards.

In March 2022, Tower released its new brand identity 'Thinking Ahead', reflecting the company's growth strategy and customer-centric approach. In 2025, Tower launched a new brand platform and tagline, ‘forward thinking, future ready’, reflecting its focus on simpler, more accessible and digitally led insurance. The platform was introduced through ‘The Misses’ campaign, which used humour and everyday mishaps to position Tower as helping customers prepare for unexpected events. The campaign later received Kantar’s June 2025 Ad Impact Award.

In May 2022, Tower announced the acquisition of TSB's insurance portfolio for $5.2 million. Tower has been underwriting TSB's portfolio since 2004. This was in addition to Tower's acquisitions of Club Marine, ANZs insurance business and a small Westpac legacy portfolio. In June 2024, Tower entered a five-year referral agreement with Kiwibank, which took effect in September 2024. In its May 2026 half-year results, Tower confirmed a further back-book referral arrangement through which it would offer insurance to a portfolio of Kiwibank customers whose existing policies were administered by Ando.

Tower's current and future partnerships include:

- Westpac, the Australasian multinational banking and financial services company. Since July 2026, Tower has underwritten Westpac New Zealand’s house, contents, motor, and landlord insurance products Westpac NZ sells to its customers.
- Kiwibank, the New Zealand state owned bank and financial services provider, which offers its customers house, contents, car and specialist insurance via Tower.
- Trade Me Group, which offers customers online, home, contents and car insurance via Tower under the 'Trade Me Insurance' offering.
- Allianz, one of the world's leading travel insurance specialists, who deliver travel insurance and pet insurance products.
- Coastguard New Zealand, the country's primary maritime search and rescue charity organisation. Tower supports Coastguard's core operations and volunteers.
- TSB, the New Zealand bank and financial services provider, with its own branded portfolio of insurance underwritten by Tower as well as referring its customers to Tower for their insurance needs.
- New Zealand Defence Force, providing tailored insurance policies, for current and former service men and women, and their families.
