= Wellington Drive Technologies =

Ao Frio Ltd (AoF) (Formerly Wellington Drive Technologies) is a New Zealand–based company that supplies electricity-saving, electronically commutated (EC) motors and fans, Internet of Things (IoT) components and Software as a Service (SaaS) solutions worldwide, primarily for commercial coolers serving the beverage and food industries. Their focus is on advanced motors, electronics and software that save power.

The company makes motors from industrial plastics, rather than from stamped metal parts. They claim that this provides advantages in costs, performance and reliability. The company's products are suitable for ventilation, heat recovery, refrigeration and air conditioning.

The company was established in 1986 as a patent holding and licensing organization. In 1998 the company was restructured substantially and since then its engineering and commercial activities have been focused providing for the domestic and light industrial appliance market.

In 2022, the company rebranded to AoFrio, with the ticker AOF on the NZX.

AoFrio maintains a multi-disciplinary research and engineering team in its corporate headquarters in Auckland, New Zealand.

The company is currently listed on the New Zealand Stock Exchange (NZX) and the CEO is Greg Balla, who joined the company in 2021.
