= Rakon =

Frequency controller manufacturer

Rakon Limited
- Type: Public
- Traded as: NZX: RAK
- Industry: Frequency Control, Quartz Crystal, Electronics, GPS, Wireless
- Founded: 4 April 1967
- Founder: Warren Robinson
- Headquarters: Auckland, New Zealand
- Number of locations: New Zealand, United Kingdom, France, India, China
- Area served: Global
- Products: TCXO, OCXO, VCXO, Quartz crystal, Crystal oscillator
- Revenue: NZD $171 million (April 2022)
- Parent: Bourns, Inc.
- Website: www.rakon.com

Rakon Limited is a technology company founded in 1967 that designs and manufactures frequency control products, primarily quartz crystals and temperature-compensated crystal oscillators (TCXO), oven controlled crystal oscillators (OCXO) and voltage controlled crystal oscillators (VCXO). Its head office is in Auckland, New Zealand with wholly owned subsidiaries in the United Kingdom and France with joint venture operations in India and China. The company specialises in supplying frequency-control products to the GPS industry.

Rakon at 9th Bengaluru Space Expo 2026, BIEC

== History ==
Rakon was founded on 4 April 1967 by Warren Robinson. Robinson had previously operated a business manufacturing marine radios, Marlin Electronics. These marine radios required between 6 and 12 quartz crystals with each region within New Zealand requiring a different set of frequencies.

The only source for these crystals was the NZPO (New Zealand Post Office), and delivery times were often measured in months, which was an ongoing problem for Robinson in his ability to supply his radios. Warren Robinson realising there was an opportunity to compete with the NZPO sold Marlin Electronics to Autocrat Radio and went on to found Rakon Industries (RIL) a few years later (1967). Initially, the New Zealand government blocked Robinson's application to import crystal manufacturing equipment as they didn't wish there to be undue competition to the post office, however by 1967 Robinson was able to secure an import license for the equipment and started manufacturing quartz crystals, in his garage, to supply the local radio market.

=== Early growth ===
By 1971, Rakon had moved into its own premises and employed over 30 staff; it had also begun exporting the crystals to Australia and South East Asia. In 1972 Warren Robinson set up a second manufacturing plant in Singapore to supply the growing markets of Thailand, Malaysia, Philippines and Taiwan.

=== Crystal crash ===
Around 1980, Warren Robinson's eldest son, Brent Robinson, joined Rakon as managing director. Brent was made responsible for the crystal manufacturing business, while Warren focused on his other expanding business, Rakon Computers, which at the time owned the distribution rights for Unix in Australia and New Zealand.

Around this time, a new technology began being widely adopted in radio designs, frequency synthesis. This meant that rather than a radio requiring a pair of crystals for every frequency (one for transmit and a second for receive), only one single crystal was required. The impact of this was that Rakon's core crystal business was in rapid decline, with the total market size shrinking to 10% of its previous size.

=== TCXO development ===
In the mid-1980s, Brent came across a product type known as temperature-compensated crystal oscillators. These were mainly being manufactured in Japan at the time and were used, in particular, in cellular phones.

By the late 1980s, Rakon was supplying TCXOs to NEC Australia's Melbourne factory. The supply of these products became the main focus of Rakon's operations.

In order to increase the manufacturing volume, reduce the cost and improve the performance of the products, Rakon developed its manufacturing processes.

=== GPS market ===
In 1991, the company began supplying frequency references in the GPS industry.

=== Public listing ===
Rakon continued to focus on developing products for the GPS market. In 2006, they claimed to still hold over 50% market share in the autonomous GPS market (GPS which functions without assistance from the CDMA phone network).

In early 2006, Rakon announced they would list on the New Zealand stock exchange, and on 13 April, released their IPO prospectus.

=== Overseas expansion and recent financial performance ===
In March 2007, Rakon acquired the frequency-control products division of C-MAC Microtechnology. This acquisition gave Rakon a European-based operation, including 2 factories located in the UK and France. The new business unit specialised in other forms of wireless communications and allowed Rakon to become less dependent on the GPS market, and expanded Rakon's product range to include oven-controlled crystal oscillators (OCXO), voltage-controlled crystal oscillators (VCXO), the Pluto ASIC and a range of low performance commodity products.

In 2008 Rakon formed a joint venture with (Centum Electronics) to manufacture high value telecommunications infrastructure products and to commercialise Rakon France's R&D programme. Also in 2008, Rakon formed a joint venture with (Timemaker) to vertically integrate quartz crystal supply.

In 2011 Rakon opened a joint venture facility, Rakon Crystal Chengdu, in China. The investment was an unsuccessful one, with Rakon exiting from its 80% stake in the Chengdu factory in July 2013.

Between 2012 and 2014, Rakon suffered a drop in revenue and margins and made a series of losses, shedding up to 86% of its market capitalisation compared to five years prior.

In August 2013, the NZ Shareholders Association demanded the resignation of Rakon's Chairman, Bryan Mogridge, and another director, Darren Robinson (son of founder Warren Robinson), after the company announced poor results and a $30m write down of assets.

Rakon was also fined $30,000 by the NZX after it failed to maintain continuous disclosure obligations over selling 80% of its shareholding in its Chengdu factory.

Rakon returned to a small profit in November 2015 but with much reduced revenues compared to pre-2008 financial crisis levels.

== Military applications and export controls ==
Rakon has supplied frequency-control products for use in military applications. The company has stated at various times that these applications account for 1% of their output, or 10% of their revenue.

In May 2006 the New Zealand Herald published an investigation into the supply of Rakon products to Rockwell for incorporation in United States Armed Forces military precision-guided weapons. The reporting raised questions about Rakon's awareness of the intended end-use of its products, reportedly dating back to 1994, and whether their export was consistent with New Zealand export restrictions.

Rakon continues to maintain that their products had not been designed for military applications and decisions about their end-use rested with the customers. In June 2006, the New Zealand Ministry of Foreign Affairs and Trade cleared Rakon products for export, stating that they were unlikely to have been specifically designed for military use.
