= Vector Limited =

New Zealand electricity distribution company

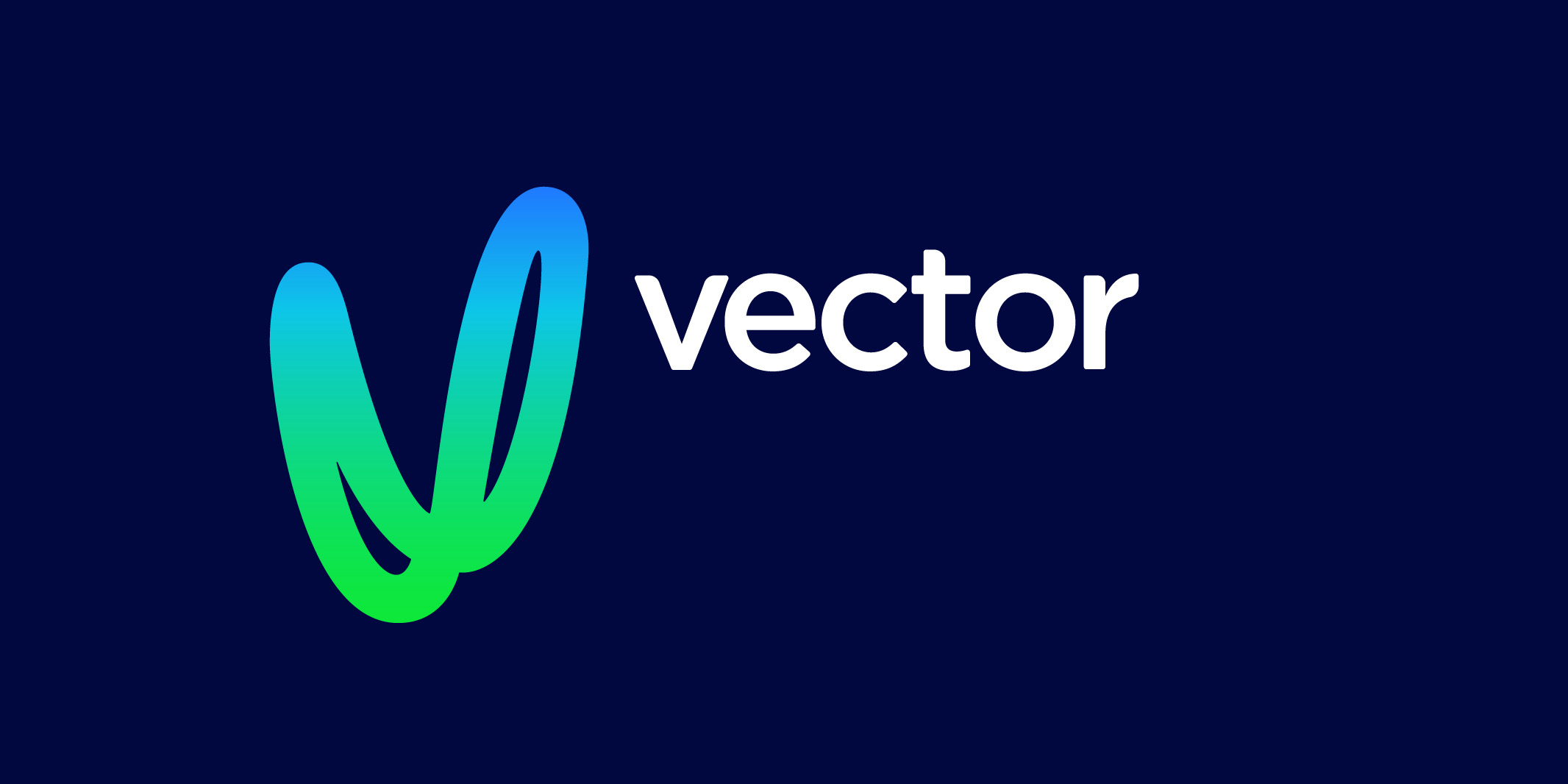
- Type: Public
- Traded as: NZX: VCT; S&P/NZX 50 component
- Industry: Energy
- Predecessor: Mercury Energy
- Founded: 1999; 27 years ago
- Headquarters: Newmarket, Auckland, New Zealand
- Services: Electricity distribution Natural gas retailing LPG retailing Electricity and gas metering
- Revenue: ▲NZ$1,252,200,000 (2013)
- Operating income: ▲NZ$630,500,000 (2013)
- Net income: ▲NZ$201,700,000 (2013)
- Owner: Entrust (community trust) (75.1%)
- Website: www.vector.co.nz

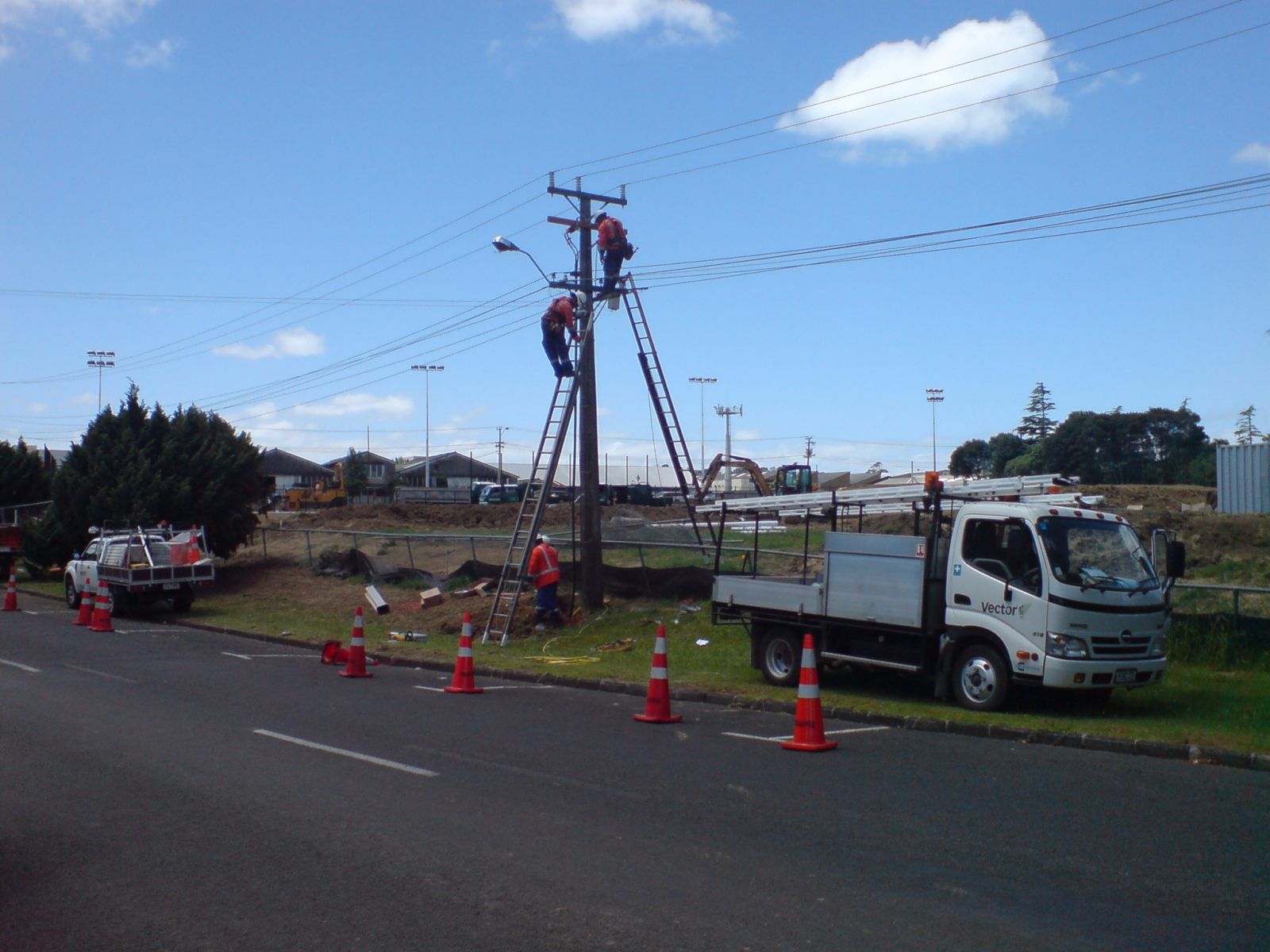
Vector linemen working in Henderson

Vector Limited is a New Zealand energy company, which runs a portfolio of businesses delivering energy and communication services across Australasia and the Pacific. Its primary business is electricity distribution, along with distributing piped gas. It also has a bottled gas business, owns a fibre optic cable network (Vector Fibre), deploys electricity and gas meters (through a 50 percent ownership in Bluecurrent - previously Vector Metering), manages solar infrastructure projects and offers cybersecurity services and a data platform.

Entrust, formerly named Auckland Energy Consumer Trust, owns around three quarters of its shares, and had full ownership until 2005.

== History ==
=== Auckland Electric Power Board ===
The Auckland Electric Power Board (AEPB) was formed in 1922, taking over the generation, distribution and supply of electricity from several local councils. All electricity was generated locally until 1925 when the transmission line from Horahora Power Station to Penrose substation was commissioned. The AEPB was connected to the newly completed Arapuni Power Station in 1929.

Under the government reforms introduced by the Energy Companies Act 1992, the Auckland Electric Power Board was corporatised and became Mercury Energy Limited, a company owned by the Auckland Energy Consumer Trust (AECT).

==== Auckland Energy Consumer Trust ====
The AECT was established, along with 29 other energy trusts throughout the country, to ensure that the power lines remained in the control of electricity consumers.

The AECT retained 100% ownership of Vector until 2005, when they agreed to Vector's initial public offering, or share float, of 24.9% of the shares in Vector, so it could raise money to buy gas company NGC Holdings - Vector has since gone on to invest in other businesses too. The result of this share float, and a subsequent buy back of shares in 2009, is that the AECT holds 75.4% of Vector's shares, a controlling interest.

The AECT has had guardianship of Vector on behalf of the Auckland community only since 1993. However, the idea of community ownership of Auckland's power network goes back much further than that. The Auckland Electric Power Board was set up in 1922 as a consumer-owned utility. (Before that, electricity distribution was looked after by local councils.) Even back then, the AEPB's founders understood the value and importance of electricity supply to Aucklanders, and this model of guardianship of electricity distribution for the good of the entire community continues today with the AECT.

=== Mercury Energy Limited ===
When incorporated, Mercury Energy Limited owned the distribution business in Auckland, Manukau and Papakura, and also retailed electricity to customers connected to the network and elsewhere. Further government reforms were introduced by the Electricity Industry Reform Act 1998. These reforms prohibited one business from being involved in distribution and generation as well as retail, so the retail business of Mercury Energy Limited was sold to Mighty River Power, a state-owned enterprise. Mighty River continued to use the name as a trading name, and in 2016 changed its company name to Mercury Energy.

== Vector Limited ==
Mercury Energy Limited changed its name to Vector Limited and kept its lines business. A flotation on the local stock exchange in 2005 provided funds for further acquisitions and expansion of its fibre optics network

=== Subsequent acquisitions ===
- UnitedNetworks was bought in 2002. It was a lines company operating on Auckland's North Shore and Waitakere which included a telecommunications network and Auckland's gas network. This purchase made Vector the largest multi-utility company in New Zealand.
- NGC Holdings (gas) bought from Australian Gas Light (AGL). Two-thirds in 2004, the balance in 2005. This gas transmission and distribution business was sold in 2016, becoming Firstgas, although Vector retained ownership the Auckland gas distribution network.
- NZ Windfarms A 19.99% cornerstone shareholding was bought in 2007 and later increased to 22 percent.
- Advanced Metering Services, a joint venture with Siemens (NZ) to provide advanced metering technology and services. Established 2007, the remaining 50 percent was bought from Siemens in 2010.
- Arc Innovations, a subsidiary of Meridian Energy, was acquired in November 2014.

=== Sale of Wellington electricity network ===
Vector sold its Wellington electricity network in 2008 to Cheung Kong Infrastructure Holdings Limited of Hong Kong for $785 million. The network was renamed Wellington Electricity.

=== Sale of Vector Metering Services ===
In June 2023 Vector completed the sale of 50 percent of Vector Metering to Australia's Queensland Investment Corporation and rebranded as Bluecurrent.

=== Sale of HRV ===
In Aug 2025 Vector completed the sale of 100 percent of HRV to a consortium of then current franchisees and management.

== NZIER report on the AECT ==
In 2006 the New Zealand Institute of Economic Research compared Trust ownership of Vector with four alternatives (local council ownership, management by a professional trust company, handing shares over to beneficiaries, local councils and the Auckland Regional Council, and transfer of shares to a new regional infrastructure body). On every measure, including efficiency and what was best for energy consumers in the Trust area, the NZIER concluded that the current setup is the best option.

Vector's customers hold 75.1% of its shares through the Auckland Energy Consumer Trust, and 24.9% of its shares are traded on the NZX. An annual dividend of $150–320 is paid to each customer in the Trust area. Two of Vector's directors are trustees of the Auckland Energy Consumer Trust. The Trust's close relationship with the Vector board of directors has been under scrutiny by the media and the New Zealand Commerce Commission during the mid-2000s, and some have called for the trust to be disbanded, with Vector shares instead to be handed over directly to the beneficiaries of the trust. The proposal however gained no general support.

== Electricity distribution ==
Vector owns and operates the electricity sub-transmission and distribution networks across the majority of the Auckland Region, from Wellsford in the north to central Papakura in the south, and over the Tamaki Strait to Waiheke Island. The network consists of 19,280 km of lines, fifty-seven percent of which is underground, at voltages of 110 kV, 33 kV, 22 kV, 11 kV and 400 V. Electricity is taken from Transpower's national grid at fourteen grid exit points: Wellsford, Silverdale, Albany, Wairau Road, Henderson and Hepburn Road for the northern network, and Mount Roskill, Hobson Street, Penrose, Otahuhu, Pakuranga, Mangere, Wiri, and Takanini for the southern network. Due to differing vector groups, the only distribution level connection between the northern and southern networks is via a phase-shifting transformer between Avondale zone substation (Mount Roskill) and Brickworks zone substation (Hepburn Road). In October 2016, Vector installed a 1MW/2.3MWh lithium-ion battery for grid strengthening near Glen Innes in Auckland. It consists of 24 Powerpacks.

Vector Limited network statistics for the year ending 31 March 2025
Parameter	Value
Regulatory asset base	$4,378 million
Line charge revenue	$772.0 million
Capital expenditure	$451.0 million
Operating expenditure	$179.8 million
Customer connections	625,993
Energy delivered	8,653 GWh
Peak demand	1,802 MW
Total line length	19,725 km
Distribution and low-voltage overhead lines	7,790 km
Distribution and low-voltage underground cables	10,902 km
Subtransmission lines and cables	1,032 km
Poles	126.914
Distribution transformers	23,007
Zone substation transformers	229
Average interruption duration (SAIDI)	175 minutes
Average interruption frequency (SAIFI)	1.48

== Gas distribution ==
Vector owns and operates the natural gas distribution system in the Auckland region and northern Waikato district (namely Tuakau and Pōkeno).

Vector Limited gas network statistics for the year ending 30 September 2024
Parameter	Value
Regulatory asset base	$503 million
Line charge revenue	$63.3 million
Capital expenditure	$21.4 million
Operating expenditure	$17.1 million
Customer connections	120,354
Total gas conveyed	13,041 TJ
Maximum daily load	55.3 TJ
System length	7,014 km
