= SLI Systems =

- Type: Public company
- Industry: Software eCommerce
- Founded: 2001
- Headquarters: United States
- Products: Learning Search; Learning Navigation; Site Champion; Learning Recommendations
- Website: SLI-Systems.com

SLI Systems provided cloud-based search tools for online retailers under a "software as a service" (SaaS) model. It was a public company listed on the New Zealand Exchange.

SLI is an acronym for Search, Learn and Improve.

== Products ==
SLI's main product, Learning Search, uses the behavior of its users to determine search results. The company also sells a user-generated search engine optimization (SEO) product called Site Champion, and a site navigation product called Learning Navigation.

== Origin ==
SLI Systems was formed in 2001, and in 2013 the company raised $27 million NZD in its initial public offering and listed on the New Zealand Exchange. The core technology was originally developed at GlobalBrain, a company founded in 1998 by Grant Ryan. That company was acquired by the internet arm of US media company, NBC in April, 2000 for US$32 million, but after dot-com crash Shaun Ryan and others bought the technology back from NBC, and formed SLI Systems.

SLI formerly had offices in San Jose, Christchurch, Tokyo, Melbourne and London and over 400 clients internationally including, FTD, 7 for all Mankind, Harry & David and Next.

== Performance ==
In 2013, SLI Systems launched an initial public offering on the New Zealand Exchange, raising $27m NZD with shares issued at $1.50, to help fund growth into important markets like Japan and Brazil. Key investors included NZ entrepreneur Sam Morgan. SLI Systems's share price performed strongly initially, rising to $2.50, before falling to as low as 71c after the company posted larger than expected losses and had some unexpected senior management changes 2015.

SLI Systems announced to the New Zealand Exchange in November 2015 that revenue guidance would be 29% above the previous year. Recent significant client customer wins announced at the 2015 annual general meeting included Lenovo, David Jones, Harvey Norman and Paul Smith. SLI Systems' UK website also list a number of clients via case studies .

In January 2019 the company was taken private via acquisition by a private equity firm. The SLI search algorithm and IP were rolled into the company portfolio.

The company no longer operates independently and was delisted by the New Zealand Stock Exchange in January 2019. Soon after, the US domestic headquarters in San Jose were shut down.
