= RoofTG =

- Type: Public company
- Industry: Construction
- Headquarters: Auckland, New Zealand
- Area served: New Zealand
- Products: Roofing products
- Services: Construction
- Website: www.rooftg.com

RoofTG (formerly AHI Roofing) is a manufacturer of stone chip coated metal roof tiles based in Auckland, New Zealand and with plants in New Zealand, United States (California), Hungary and Malaysia. The company sells under both the Gerard and Decra brand names.

== History ==
=== Product development ===
AHI Roofing was created when Lou Fisher produced the world's first steel tile. Today AHI Roofing does business in over eighty countries worldwide in steel roof tiles.

It was a world shortage of oil-based paint that began the coated steel tile story. In 1947, many large ironclad buildings in Britain were coated with a bituminous emulsion. It proved to be extremely tough and protective, adding to the life of the cladding.

The first coated metal roofing tiles to be made in New Zealand were produced by Martile Roofing Ltd in Howick in 1956 and were pressed from an aluminium manganese alloy. They were then coated with High Bake Enamel. By 1957, L.J. Fisher had bought the rights to use the Martile profile from A.L.W. Martinsen and Son Ltd and was producing his own tile. Part of the condition of the rights purchase was that Fisher’s four-pan tile with its bitumastic emulsion coating was to be made from galvanised steel, thereby ensuring a different product. He formed LJ Fisher & Co. Ltd. (LJF) in 1957. In 1969, LJF merged with Alex Harvey & Sons and the New Zealand activities of Australian Consolidated Industries, forming Alex Harvey Industries (AHI), with AHI Roofing Pty Ltd being its subsidiary.

Returning to Auckland from the UK in 1957, Fisher started producing coated and chipped panels from galvanised steel for roofing and cladding. Originally the natural stone chips were added to prevent panels sticking together during transportation. However their attractive appearance quickly became a product feature customers demanded. Fisher also experimented with crushed shells and bricks before natural stone chips became the top choice for their aesthetics and durability.

=== International market expansion ===
AHI expanded sales rapidly in the 1970s and 1980s. It was not until 1990 that a competitor made it to market called Metrotile (NZ) Ltd with a similar steel tile. AHI’s coated steel tiles were the first major innovation in residential roofing for more than thirty years. The new roofing material quickly became the choice of architects and major construction companies throughout New Zealand. AHI entered the European market in the 1970s. AHI’s earliest acrylic coated tiles have been used in the harsh winters of Canada from the 1970s and in Scandinavia from the 1980s.

The growing success of metal tile technology as an export product resulted in the commissioning of new manufacturing plants under licence, in Denmark, Malaysia and the United States by the late 1980s. It was during this period that the company moved to acrylic coating technology (for improved chip adhesion) and launched the Colortile product on the New Zealand market. The Gerard worldwide operation (excluding the United States) was purchased by Carter Holt Harvey in 1989 and the CoronaShake product was launched in 1992 and Oberon in 1995. The company is now owned by Fletcher Building. and sells product in over 120 countries.

=== International offices ===
North America	South America	Oceania	Europe	Africa	Asia
Canada	Argentina	Australia; New Zealand	Hungary; Poland; United Kingdom; France; Italy	United Arab Emirates	(Taiwan) Republic of China; Indonesia; Japan; Malaysia; United Arab Emirates

=== Timeline ===
- 1940 - During World War II, bitumen paint-protected iron cladding was used in the UK
- 1954 - Lou Fisher observed the bitumen coating process.
- 1957 - The first Fisher tile was manufactured in Auckland. (The world's first steel roof tile)
- 1964 - 10-Pan Harvey tile was developed.
- 1967 - 'Improved' interlocking profile developed.
- 1960-70 - Stone chips refined; overglaze added.
- 1970s - Exports to Europe, licensed manufacture in Belgium 1979 and Denmark in 1981.
- 1980 - Acrylic coatings introduced, improving durability.
- 1980s - Exports to Asia, licensed manufacture in Malaysia 1985.
- 1989 - Gerard operations (outside USA) purchased.
- 1989 - USA plant established - Corona, California
- 1981-94 - Export Offices in Canada 1981,. Australia 1989, Central Europe 1991, Persian Gulf 1993, Japan 1994, Hong Kong 1998, Turkey 1999, Slovenia 2000, Poland 2001, France 2004.
- 1995 - Zincalume Steel substrate replaces galvanized steel, further extending product life.
- 1988 - Purchased by Tasman Building Products, renamed AHI Roofing.
- 2003 - Purchased by Fletcher Building.
- 2005 - Purchased Plant of former licensee in Malaysia.
- 2009 - New plant starts to operate in Hungary.

== Production ==
AHI Roofing chip-coated, pressed metal roofing tiles are made from steel that is manufactured by New Zealand Steel from black iron sand, found on the West Coast beaches of the North Island. The steel is coated with zinc/aluminium alloy (Zincalume). The main component of the paint system is acrylic resin, produced in New Zealand. The coatings are water-based or water dispersed. The “chip” used to coat the textured roofing tiles is crushed natural rock quarried in New Zealand.
