= Bremworth Limited =

New Zealand wool carpet manufacturer

Bremworth Ltd
- Company type: Public company NZX: BRW
- Industry: Carpets and textiles
- Founded: 1959
- Headquarters: Auckland, New Zealand
- Number of locations: New Zealand, Australia
- Area served: Global
- Products: Wool carpets
- Revenue: NZ$88.4m (June 2025)
- Number of employees: Approximately 400 (2022)
- Website: www.bremworth.co.nz

Bremworth Limited (formerly Cavalier Corporation) is a New Zealand company specializing in the manufacture of broadloom wool carpet. Floated in 1984, the company was once included in the NZX 50 share index, as one of New Zealand's 50 largest public companies. It left the NZX50 due to a low market capitalisation in January 2013.

== History ==
Doug Bremner formed the Bremworth Carpet Company and established a small carpet factory in Papatoetoe, Auckland, in 1959. UEB Industries bought the company in 1967. Tony Timpson and Grant Biel left UEB and formed Cavalier Carpets as an all-wool carpet manufacturer in Wiri, Auckland, in 1972. Cavalier Carpets bought Bremworth Carpet from New Zealand Equities in 1988, and the merged companies rebranded as Cavalier Bremworth in 1991. The parent company, Cavalier Corporation, changed its name to Bremworth Ltd in 2021.

== Group holdings ==
- 100% ownership of Bremworth Carpets and Rugs Limited, which has representation across Australia and New Zealand as well as a carpet manufacturing plant in Auckland.
- 100% ownership of Bremworth Spinners, which operates yarn spinning plants in Napier and Whanganui.
- 100% ownership of Elco Direct Ltd., a wool procurement company.
