= Kind + Jugend Innovation Award =

German design award for baby products

- Description: Honoring excellence in baby and children's products innovation and safety
- Country: Germany (Cologne)
- Presented by: Koelnmesse

The Kind + Jugend Innovation Award is a German design award granted annually to the best overall baby product in the areas of design, safety, user-friendliness, degree of innovation, and quality of workmanship. Particular emphasis is placed on innovation and safety, with past winners displaying unique designs and new technology.

== History ==
Held annually in Cologne, Germany, the Kind + Jugend trade fair has made a name for itself as the leading international fair for infants' and children's products, including carriages, car seats, and fashion. The fair attracts more than seven hundred exhibitors and sixteen thousand visitors. In 2005, the first Innovation Award was presented.

Selections are made by a jury in the weeks leading up to the trade show. The jury is composed of leading experts in infant health and safety and representatives from applicable international trade magazines.

== Categories ==
The products are separated into five categories, and there is one winner in each.

- World of Mobile Baby: includes baby carriages and accessories
- World of Baby Safety: includes safety seats and accessories
- World of Baby Furniture & Textiles: includes children’s furniture, textile outfitting and accessories
- World of Baby Care: includes hygiene products, electric appliances and accessories
- World of Baby Toys: includes toys for babies and small children

== Recipients ==
=== 2005 winners ===
- Mobile Baby: Xplory (Stokke, Stroller)
- Baby Safety: Cybex Solution (Cybex Europe, Car seat)
- Baby Furniture & Textiles: (Roba Baumann, Expandable Children’s Bed)
- Baby Care: Reer Bevetel (Babyphone)
- Baby Toys: Symphony Light & Motion (Tiny Love, Mobile)

=== 2006 winners ===
- Mobile Baby: ENGLACHA (Prokids International, Pram)
- Baby Safety: CYBEX ZERONE (CYBEX Industrial Ltd., Child Safety Seat)
- Baby Furniture & Textiles: Fresco Bloom (Bloom, High chair)
- Baby Care: Cool Twister (Nuernberg Gummi GmbH & Co., “ensures baby food is served at precisely the right temperature”)
- Baby Toys: MoOB (Maitz Products KEG, Modular Mobility Unit)

=== 2007 winners ===
- Mobile Baby: Skate (Peg Perego, Stroller)
- Baby Safety: ROMER KING plus (BRITAX ROMER, Child Safety Seat)
- Baby Furniture & Textiles: hoppop (BabyArt, Nursery Seat)
- Baby Care: Shampoo Rinse Cup (TrendyKid Ltd.)
- Baby Toys: Shop & Play 2-in-1 Activity Centre (Infantino UK)

=== 2008 winners ===
- World of Baby Toys: Tessell (IWASHIN DESIGN South Korea)

=== 2009 winners ===
- World of Moving Baby: kobi (mima push-chair)
- World of Travelling Baby: Maxi-Cosi Car Seat Family (Dorel Netherlands)
- World of Moving Baby and Travelling Baby Accessories: Lolaloo (Lolaloo GmbH)
- World of Baby Safety at Home: Slamjam (BDI Inventions Ltd/Askopa
- World of Baby Toys: Kiditec (Techno Bloxx AG)
- World of Baby Textiles: Wetpets (Wetpets GbR)
- World of Baby Care: Babybath with removable bath ring (TIGEX)
- World of Baby Furniture: alma urban cot/crib by bloom (Bloom baby)
