= Mainfreight =

New Zealand logistics company

Mainfreight Limited
- Formerly: Mainfreight Transport Limited
- Type: Public
- Traded as: NZX: MFT; S&P/NZX 50 component
- Industry: Logistics
- Founded: 6 March 1978
- Founder: Bruce Plested
- Headquarters: Auckland, New Zealand
- Number of locations: 336 (2024)
- Area served: 27 countries
- Key people: Bruce Plested (Chairman, Founding Owner); Don Braid (Global Managing Director, CEO)
- Services: Transport, logistics, freight forwarding, supply chain management
- Revenue: ▼NZ$4.72 billion (2024)
- Operating income: ▼NZ$395 million (2024)
- Number of employees: 10,664 (2024)
- Subsidiaries: Daily Freight (NZ), Carotrans (Worldwide), Owens (AU/NZ), ChemCouriers (AU/NZ) Mainfreight Europe (EU), Mainfreight Americas (USA), Mainfreight Asia, Mainfreight India
- Website: www.mainfreight.com

Mainfreight Limited is a New Zealand logistics and transport company that commenced operations in Auckland in 1978. It has been listed on the New Zealand Exchange since 1996 and is the country's largest logistics company. Mainfreight is headquartered in Auckland.

== History ==
Bruce Plested founded Mainfreight on 6 March 1978 with just NZ$7,200 and a 1969 Bedford truck. In 1979 he partnered with Neil Graham, based in Christchurch, while Plested remained in Auckland.

When the company was founded it entered a highly regulated transport market. A licence from New Zealand Railways Corporation was needed to carry freight over 150 km. When deregulation of land transport occurred in October 1982, Mainfreight quickly took advantage of the opportunities presented and won a large share of the freight market. In describing the foundation of Mainfreight in 2000, Plested said, "We moved all our freight by sea between Auckland, and Christchurch and Dunedin, and we worked weekend shifts to make sure we loaded and unloaded the ship using the whole of the seven days – we found that was faster and more reliable than our big competitors."

== Subsidiaries ==
=== Mainfreight Australia ===
The Australian domestic freight and logistics operations commenced as Mainline Distribution in 1989, with the opening of its first branch in Sydney.[4] Following the success of the Sydney depot, the company expanded its national footprint, establishing major operations in Melbourne, Brisbane, Perth, Adelaide, and Canberra, alongside a growing network across other capital cities.

Over time, the business extended its reach beyond metropolitan centres into key regional and industrial locations, including Townsville, Mackay, Toowoomba, Geelong, Gold Coast, Newcastle, Dubbo, Tamworth, Traralgon, Ballarat, Bendigo, Albury, and Bunbury, supporting both regional communities and national supply chains.

Today, Mainfreight operates an extensive network of 74 branches across Australia, spanning all major capital cities and regional hubs coast to coast. They provide a broad range of freight and logistics services, including international ocean imports and exports, air freight, less-than-container load (LCL), full truckload (FTL), warehousing and distribution, handling of hazardous materials, nationwide palletised freight transport, and port and wharf (drayage) operations.[6]

=== Mainfreight International ===
Mainfreight International was Mainfreight's first international sea and airfreight business and was started in 1984 by Bruce Plested's brother Gerald. They established agencies in the early days with Australian, Pacific Island and United States freight forwarders and the established agents in most major trading partner countries of New Zealand.

=== Mainfreight Americas (USA) ===
Mainfreight started operating in the United States after its purchase of CaroTrans International in 1999 and expanded in 2007 from the acquisition of Target Logistics.

In 2008, 34 United States locations were re-branded as Mainfreight USA. The Mainfreight Americas network has grown now to having 79 branches located throughout Canada, Mexico, United States, and Chile. In 2023 the Mainfreight USA transportation sector set a new milestone by obtaining their Motor Carrier Authority license leading them to expand their LTL (Less-than-Truckload) ground shipping operations.

=== Europe ===
In 2011, Mainfreight Limited acquired the business of Wim Bosman Group providing further opportunities to expand their international global presence with branches located throughout Europe. Mainfreight branches are located throughout France, Poland, United Kingdom, Germany, the Netherlands, Romania, Spain, Italy, and Belgium.

In 2022 due to the political conflicts and sanctions in place between Russia and Ukraine, Mainfreight suspended all domestic operations in the two territories.

== Acquisitions ==
=== Halford International ===
On 11 June 2007, Mainfreight Limited signed a call option deed to acquire all of the shares of Halford International Pty Limited (Halford International), an Australian-based, privately owned, international freight forwarder and logistics provider. The purchase acquired network offices throughout Australia and New Zealand, Japan, Germany, Asia, and the United States.

=== Owens Group ===
In 2003 Mainfreight bought Owens Group, one of New Zealand's largest trucking firms. This takeover was in response to the purchase of Tranz Rail by Australian transport firm Toll Holdings. With the takeover of the Owens Group in 2003 they purchased Owens International Australia. In 2006 the New Zealand Mainfreight International and Owens International businesses were also merged to make Mainfreight Owens International Ltd (now Mainfreight International).

=== Wim Bosman Group ===
In March 2011, Mainfreight entered the European market with the acquisition of Netherlands-based company Wim Bosman Group for €120 million, or NZ$227 million. Headquartered in 's-Heerenberg, the Netherlands, Wim Bosman is privately held and operates more than 1,000 transport units, manage more than 275,000m2 of cross-docking facilities and warehouse area, and employ roughly 1,414 staff within 14 branches located in The Netherlands, Belgium, France, Romania, Poland, and Russia. Within its announcement, Mainfreight stated, "Wim Bosman is a well respected, profitable organisation which will provide Mainfreight with a significant European presence and opportunity to further grow its supply chain logistic services throughout the world."

In June 2013, Mainfreight launched a lawsuit seeking €11 million or NZ$18 million against Wim Bosman Group's former owners. The lawsuit claimed that Wim Bosman, the former owner, had prior knowledge of a large client, Giant Bicycles, intentions to end corporate ties with the group. In August 2013, Mainfreight and the family of Wim Bosman reached an out of court agreement for compensation to the tune of €8.2 million or $14 million.

Since 2011, Mainfreight, under the Wim Bosman name, have opened new branches in Bergen op Zoom in The Netherlands, Cluj-Napoca in Romania, Frankfurt and Gelsenkirchen in Germany, London in United Kingdom, and Poznań/Luboń in Poland. Mainfreight also renamed Wim Bosman branches in the countries France, Poland, Russia and Ukraine under the Mainfreight name.

=== Lep New Zealand ===
Between 1994 and 1997 Mainfreight started acquiring former competitors, such as, Daily Freightways and Chem Couriers in 1994, a 75% shareholding in Lep New Zealand in 1996, and Combined Haulage and Senco Haulage in 1997. In 1998, Mainfreight acquired Australian freight forwarder ISS Express lines, subsequently establishing an Australian international freight business.

In April 2007, Mainfreight announced its intentions to sell its Pan Orient Project Logistics business and its 75% interest in Lep Australia and New Zealand to global logistics company Agility Group for A$83 million. The transaction was completed on 6 June 2007.

=== Target Logistics ===
In September 2007, it was reported by Business Wire that Mainfreight had signed a merger agreement with NYSE American-listed Target Logistics for $2.50 a share; for a total of US$54 million. Target operate domestic and international time-sensitive freight-forwarding and logistics services through its wholly owned subsidiary, Target Logistic Services. Target has offices in 35 cities throughout the United States and an international network of agents in over 70 countries.

=== CaroTrans South America ===
In May 2011, Mainfreight established a CaroTrans branch in Santiago, Chile. This endeavor launched the first permanent investment into South America. In 2020, CaroTrans Chile was re-branded as Mainfreight Chile.

=== DCB International ===
In November 2014, Mainfreight acquired a regional air and sea freight company located in Dunedin. Founded in 1969 as Dunedin Customs Brokers Ltd, DCB International provides international air and sea freight services from Dunedin. DCB had a staff base of five employees on the date of acquisition, however, staff was expected to rise to seven employees.
