= Vista Group =

Film industry technology company in New Zealand

Vista Group International Limited
- Traded as: NZX: VGL; ASX: VGL
- Industry: Film Industry
- Founded: 2014
- Founder: Murray Holdaway
- Headquarters: Auckland, New Zealand
- Number of employees: 700
- Website: www.vista.co

Vista Group International Limited (Vista Group) is a multinational tech conglomerate that provides technology for film distribution, film exhibition, and film analytics globally. The group comprises eight businesses and more than 700 staff in Auckland, Sydney, Los Angeles, London, Shanghai, Beijing, Mexico City, South Africa, the Netherlands, and Romania. Its software is installed in cinemas in 116 countries. Vista Group is listed on both the New Zealand Stock Exchange (NZX) and the Australian Securities Exchange (ASX).

== History ==
Vista Cinema (now Vista Entertainment Solutions) was founded in New Zealand in 1996. Formed through a joint venture development agreement between Village Force Cinemas Ltd (now Event Cinemas) and Madison Systems Ltd (now Fujitsu Ltd), Vista Cinema was the original company behind Vista Group. In 1997, Vista Cinema made its first overseas sales in Argentina and Fiji. Its software was adapted to handle multiple languages and accommodate the tax laws and film regulations of other countries. Vista Cinema expanded rapidly in Central and North America, Europe, and Asia. By 2003, Vista Cinema management had a direct 50% ownership of the company.

Between 2009 and 2014, Vista Cinema acquired total or partial control of technology companies focused on products for the wider film industry. The company aimed to accquire companies focused on additional sector requirements, such as film distribution management and marketing data analysis. By March 2010, Vista management had total control of the Vista Cinema and its acquisitions.

In 2014, Vista Group International had its initial public offering by the management company that owned Vista Cinema and its acquired companies. The company saw a listing on the NZX and ASX of $92.6 million, $40 million of which was new capital. Vista Group (VGL) commenced trading on the NZX Main Board on the 11th of August 2014, with a market capitalization of $191.6 million NZD.

Vista Group continued to acquire stakes in several film-focused technology companies, including a buyout of Flicks in New Zealand and a 50% stake in Powster in the United Kingdom. In August 2016, Vista Group made a deal with the movie ticket booking platform Beijing Weiying Technology (WePiao), establishing Vista China (previously a 100%-owned subsidiary of Vista Group) as a joint venture. This investment from WePiao and the extended rights from Vista Group enabled the sale of Vista's existing software (Vista Cinema, Veezi, Movio, Maccs, and Numero) and positioned Vista China to increase its footprint in the rapidly expanding Chinese film market.

In August 2017, Vista Group acquired a 60% controlling stake in its long-term Latin American business partner, Senda Dirección Tecnológica, SA de CV. The company was renamed Vista Latin America.

In April 2020, Vista Group partnered with indie theatre VOD provider ScreenPlus to launch the ScreenPlus VOD platform, making it available to major theatres in the US, Canada, and the UK.

== Businesses ==
=== Vista Entertainment Solutions ===
Vista Entertainment Solutions designs and develops cinema management software for the large circuit market (cinema exhibitors operating more than 20 screens). Vista Cinema, the company's core product, supports box office sales, concession sales, and back-of-house operations. Other Vista Cinema products include mobile applications, office administration, data analysis, online ticketing, and loyalty programs. Vista Cinema provides software to over 5500 cinemas in more than 80 countries, and as of 2015, its global market share in the large cinema market is about 38%.

=== Veezi ===
Veezi launched in March 2012 as a cloud-based cinema management system for smaller, independent cinemas (cinema exhibitors operating less than 20 screens). Veezi uses the software as a service (SaaS) model, in which users pay a subscription fee to access the product. Used worldwide by a range of small cinema operators, Veezi also supports integration with several internet ticket aggregators.

=== Movio ===
Movio, also a SaaS offer, provides marketing data analytics and campaign management software for the film industry. Movio maintains real-time data on the demographic profiles and cinema transactions of identifiable moviegoers. The data is consolidated and processed to identify audience segments, create targeted marketing campaigns, and measure their effectiveness. Movio's marketing data covers more than 39 million active moviegoers and 29% of cinema screens worldwide.

=== Maccs International ===
Maccs International's software facilitates film rights and royalty management, as well as advertising and distribution through theatrical and non-theatrical sales channels (home entertainment, etc.). Maccs operates in over 45 countries and manages theatrical distribution for over 100 film distributors. The company is the largest provider of this software outside of the US. In July 2015, Maccs formed a business relationship with Warner Bros. Entertainment Inc., its first customer in the US.

=== Numero ===
Numero provides box office reporting software for film studios, independent film distributors, and cinemas. Numero's software extracts data from cinema's point of sale software, which can be accessed by distributors for insight into box office revenue and admissions trends.

=== Powster ===
Powster provides film marketing products, music videos, and creative content globally. Their platform is a global solution that movie distributors direct audiences to purchase tickets at cinemas. The company creates more than 100 online destinations a month for 70+ movie distributors in more than 40 countries. According to its marketing materials, Powster hosts an estimated eight million consumers a week.

=== Flicks ===
Flicks, an online platform based in Auckland, New Zealand, was launched in 2005. It was acquired by Vista in April 2016. The websites and app maintain a cinema registry with movie, cinema, and session information, along with reviews, trailers, local release guides, festival profiles, and editorial pieces. It has websites aimed at New Zealand, Australian, UK, and US residents. As of March 2024, Flicks had over 22.5 million unique subscribers. At that time, Flicks entered a partnership with Prime Video in New Zealand, enabling sharing of some Prime content.

== Awards and recognition ==
- Winner: 'Exporter of the Year to the USA $500,001 - $5m' - AmCham-DHL Express Success & Innovation Awards 2012
- Winner: 'Supreme Award - AmCham-DHL Express Success & Innovation Awards 2012
- Winner: 'International Business Award for companies between $10-$50 million in turnover' - New Zealand Trade and Enterprise Business Awards 2012
- Winner: 'Equity Issue of the Year' - INFINZ Awards 2015
- Winner: 'PWC Hi-Tech Company of the Year' - New Zealand Hi-Tech Awards 2016

== Philanthropy ==
In February 2015, Vista Group International launched the Vista Foundation to support the success and growth of the New Zealand film industry and increase the accessibility of New Zealand film for global audiences. The foundation's first initiative was the Vista Film Marketing Programme, launched in partnership with the New Zealand Film Commission (NZFC). The program aims to help filmmakers learn the business side of film marketing. The first films to benefit from the Vista Film Marketing Programme were the 2016 documentary Chasing Great about the former All Black captain Richie McCaw, and in 2017, Pecking Order, a documentary following members of the Christchurch Poultry Club in the lead up to the National Competition, which was directed by Slavko Martinov and released in April 2017. The two patrons of the Vista Foundation are producer and director Roger Donaldson and actor and producer Cliff Curtis.

The Vista Foundation has also supported, in partnership with the Directors and Editors Guild of Aotearoa New Zealand (DEGANZ), the educational program Women Filmmakers Incubator, designed to increase the number of women filmmakers and accelerate their professional development.
