= Pacific Edge Limited =

New Zealand cancer diagnostics company

- Type: Public
- Traded as: NZX: PEB
- Industry: Cancer diagnostics
- Founded: 2001
- Headquarters: Dunedin, New Zealand
- Area served: United States, Australasia, Southeast Asia, and South America
- Key people: Peter Meintjes (Group CEO), Glen Costin (President - APAC)
- Products: Cxbladder suite of bladder cancer diagnostics tools
- Services: Urology
- Revenue: NZD$24.6m for the year ended 31 March 2025
- Number of employees: Approx 100 globally
- Website: www.pacificedgedx.com

Pacific Edge Limited, based in New Zealand, focuses on cancer diagnostics with a suite of bladder cancer diagnostic tools using genetic biomarkers. The company operates with a head office in Dunedin, New Zealand, and also has an office in Hershey, USA. It is listed on the Australian ASX and the New Zealand NZX main board stock exchange.

== History ==
Pacific Edge, founded in August 2001, utilizes genetic biomarkers in urine for cancer detection. Their approach is positioned as cost-effective compared to other diagnostic methods. The company offers diagnostic services in New Zealand and the United States and has partnerships in Europe and Australia.

Listed on the New Zealand NZX index, Pacific Edge has undertaken capital raising initiatives, with rounds in 2013 and 2015 aimed at advancing the commercialization of their diagnostic tests in the United States. In June 2020, Pacific Edge secured a commercial relationship with Kaiser Permanente, one of the largest health insurance providers in the U.S., for its bladder cancer tests.

In May 2026, Pacific Edge announced a capital raising to address ongoing operating losses and declining cash reserves following the loss of Medicare reimbursement coverage in the United States for its Cxbladder tests. The raise was initially structured to seek up to NZ$24 million through a placement and retail share offer. The company increased the size of the placement and ultimately raised NZ$25.4 million in new equity capital. The company stated that the proceeds would support ongoing operations, fund efforts to regain Medicare coverage, and support the commercial expansion of its diagnostic products.

== Products ==
Pacific Edge offers a series of bladder cancer diagnostic tests known as Cxbladder. These tests include specialist subtype products designed for the detection of cancerous cells and to aid clinicians and oncologists in triage. The tests are based on non-invasive urine samples, utilizing RNA and protein assays. Cxbladder is noted for its sensitivity and potential for earlier detection of bladder cancer, compared to other diagnostic methods such as cytology.

== Awards ==
Pacific Edge has won a number of awards, including:

- The NZ Innovators Award 2013
- NZBIO Biotech company of the year award 2014
- Medical Technology Association of New Zealand Innovation Award 2016
