= NZX =

National stock exchange for New Zealand

Coordinates: 41.289709°S 174.779493°E

New Zealand's Exchange
- Type: Stock exchange
- Location: Wellington, New Zealand
- Founded: 31 December 2002; 23 years ago
- Key people: Hishaam Mirza (Chief Executive)
- Currency: New Zealand dollar
- No. of listings: 182 (2024)
- Market cap: NZ$164.7 billion (2024)
- Indices: S&P/NZX 50 Index
- Website: nzx.com

NZX is the national stock exchange of New Zealand and, as NZX Limited, is also a publicly owned company listed on the exchange it operates. NZX is the parent company of Smartshares and Wealth Technologies.

As of February 2025, the NZX had 179 listed securities with a combined market value of NZ$184.62 billion.

== History ==
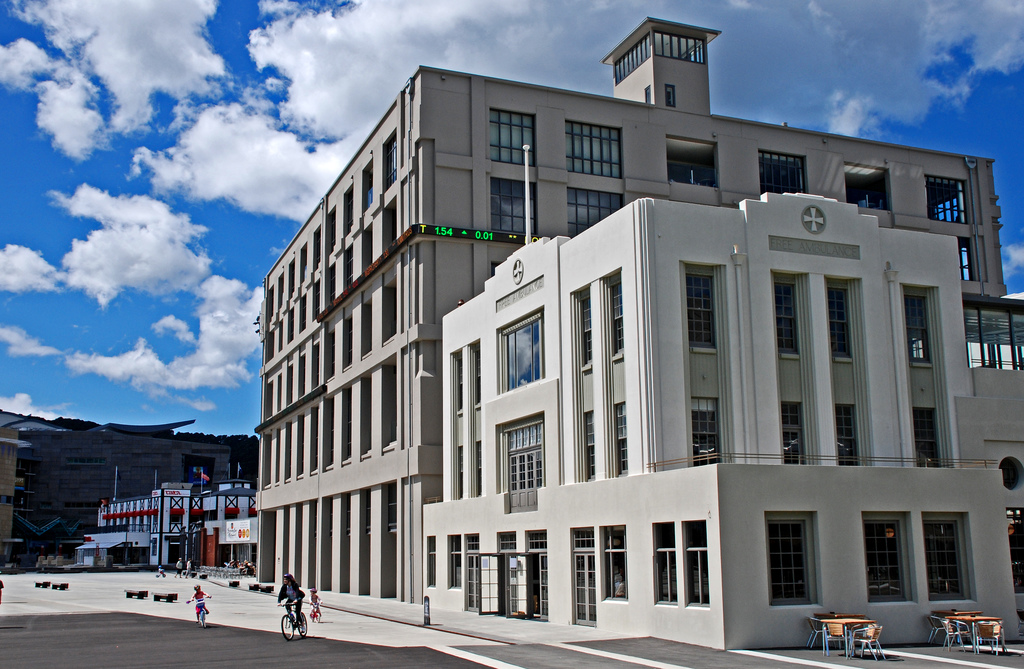
NZX Centre (the taller building), 2007

NZX established itself as a number of regional stock exchanges during the gold rush of the 1860s. The first brokers' association was started in Dunedin in 1867, then in Otago in 1868, Auckland in 1872, Wellington in 1882. The Dunedin Brokers' Association became a stock exchange in 1893, then Christchurch gained an exchange in 1900. Auckland, Christchurch, Dunedin, Thames and Wellington formed the Stock Association of New Zealand in 1915, joined by Taranaki in 1916, Invercargill in 1920 and Gisborne in 1922. The Stock Association of New Zealand set up a sub-committee to investigate setting up a national stock exchange. In 1983 the regional exchanges were amalgamated to form a national stock exchange, the New Zealand Stock Exchange (NZSE).

On 24 June 1991, NZSE implemented a computerised trading system, replacing the open outcry trading floors. This computerised system was replaced with the FASTER trading and settlement system in the late 1990s. NZX Clearing was launched in 2010 to take over clearing and settlement operations.

On 16 October 2002 the member firms of the New Zealand Stock Exchange voted in favour of demutualisation, and on 31 December 2002, NZSE became a limited liability company. On 30 May 2003, the New Zealand Stock Exchange Limited formally changed its name to the New Zealand Exchange Limited, trading as NZX, and on 3 June 2003 listed its own securities on its main equity market.

Mark Weldon was chief executive officer from 2002 to May 2012. Tim Bennett was CEO from May 2012 to 31 December 2016. NZX's Head of Markets, Mark Peterson, became interim CEO in January 2017, and permanent CEO from April 2017.

The NZX Centre building was originally constructed in 1907 for the C&A Odlin Timber Company, and is one of few surviving Edwardian industrial buildings in Wellington.

The New Zealand Exchange was subject to online distributed denial-of-service attacks that disrupted trading for five days commencing on 25 August 2020. A group of "DDOS extortionists" demanded an unspecified ransom be paid in Bitcoin or they would continue the attacks. The New Zealand Exchange ruled out paying the ransom and sought assistance from internet service provider Spark New Zealand and the country's signals intelligence agency Government Communications Security Bureau.

== Principal activities ==
The NZX involves itself in a number of activities. It operates and regulates securities and derivative markets and provides trading, post-trading and data services for securities and derivatives, as well as the providing a central securities depository. The NZX is the only registered securities exchange in New Zealand and is also an authorised futures exchange. Its wholly owned subsidiary, the New Zealand Clearing and Depository Corporation, is the operator of a designated settlement system under part 5 of the Reserve Bank of New Zealand Act 1989.

NZX provides passive funds management products through the Smartshares family of exchange-traded funds (ETFs) and is a provider of superannuation, KiwiSaver and investment products through SuperLife, which it acquired in 2015.

The NZX is also the market operator for New Zealand's wholesale electricity market and the Fonterra Shareholders' Market, under contract from the Electricity Authority and Fonterra respectively.

== Trading hours ==
The main trading board is typically open from 10 am to 4:45 pm.

== NZX as a company ==
NZX Limited is a publicly traded company listed on NZX (NZX: NZX). In 2024, the company reported issued the following financial statement:

NZX 2024 Annual Report
Information	Figure Reported
Revenue	▲NZ$120.7 million
EBIT	▲NZ$37.0 million
Net profit after tax	▲NZ$25.5 million
Total assets	▲NZ$282.4 million
Net assets (equity)	▲NZ$127.0 million
Employees	338

On 18 April 2017, NZX Limited joined the United Nations Sustainable Stock Exchange Initiative.

== See also ==
- NZX 50 Index
- List of companies listed on the New Zealand Exchange
- List of stock exchanges in the Commonwealth of Nations
