= AT Metro =

Public transport brand in Auckland, New Zealand

- Product type: Public transport
- Current owner: Auckland Transport
- Introduced: 2014; 12 years ago
- Markets: Auckland, New Zealand
- Website: at.govt.nz

AT Metro is a public transport brand in Auckland, New Zealand, managed by Auckland Transport (AT). It was launched in December 2014, following the decommissioning of the MAXX brand with updated bus and train liveries, staff uniforms, wayfinding signage and a refreshed external communications identity. In 2023, AT began decommissioning the AT Metro brand, replacing it with the refreshed AT brand identity.

== Usage ==
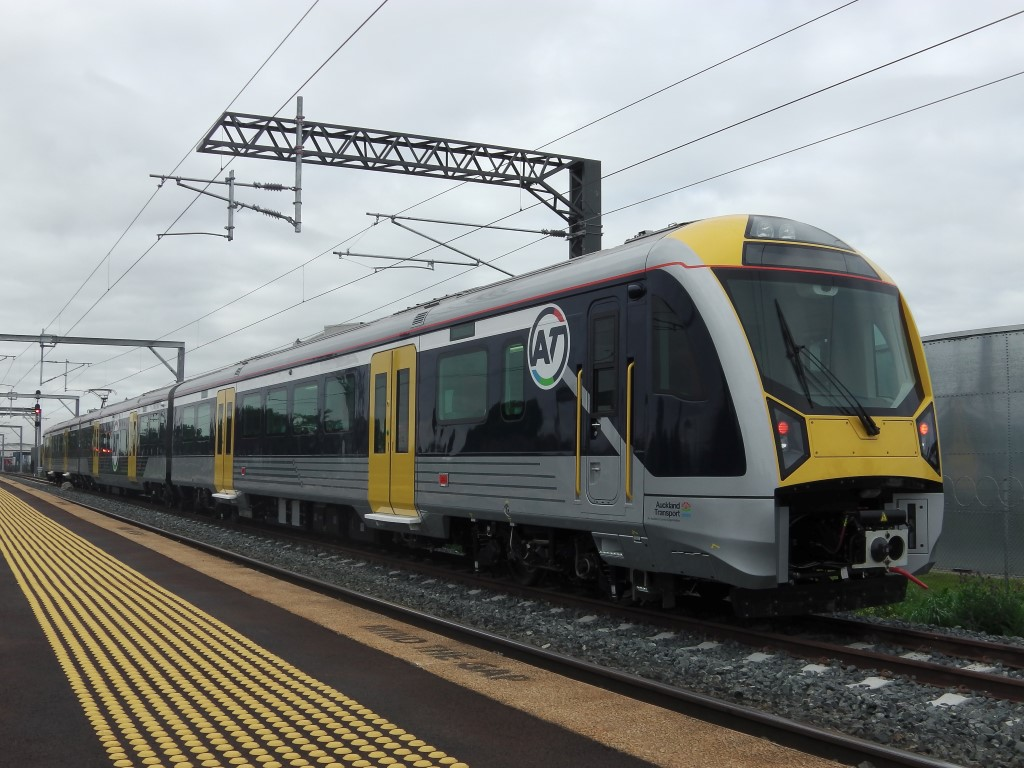
An AM class train in AT Metro livery.

Bus operator contracts were updated in late-2014 requiring fleets to be repainted in AT Metro livery in tandem with their standard maintenance schedule. Staff uniforms were rolled out within a similar timeframe. AT's new electric train fleet was manufactured with the new livery.

Liveries differ depending on the service, with rapid transit services (Northern Express bus and rail) in AT Blue and AT Silver accented in yellow highlights; specialty bus services (Link and Airporter) in custom, distinguishable colours; and other bus services in AT Blue and AT Silver. These livery colours are being retrained as the AT Metro branding is being replaced with the new AT branding.

== History ==
AT Metro replaced the MAXX brand, introduced by the former Auckland Regional Transport Authority. The MAXX brand was not widely recognised as bus operators did not update their fleets to the new livery. Auckland Transport announced in July 2012 that the 'weak' MAXX brand would be phased out, in favour of the agency's new AT branding. In 2023, AT began phasing-out the AT Metro brand, replacing it with the refreshed AT brand identity on all new electric buses, wayfinding signage and advertising.
