= Class 43 =

Class 43 or 43 class may refer to

- British Rail Class 43 (HST), power cars for the InterCity 125 high speed train
- British Rail Class 43 (Warship Class), diesel-hydraulic locomotive
- DRG Class 43, a German steam locomotive class
- New South Wales 43 class locomotive
- South African Class 43-000
