= ADK/ADB class diesel multiple unit =

Class of diesel multiple units made in Australia

ADK/ADB class railcar
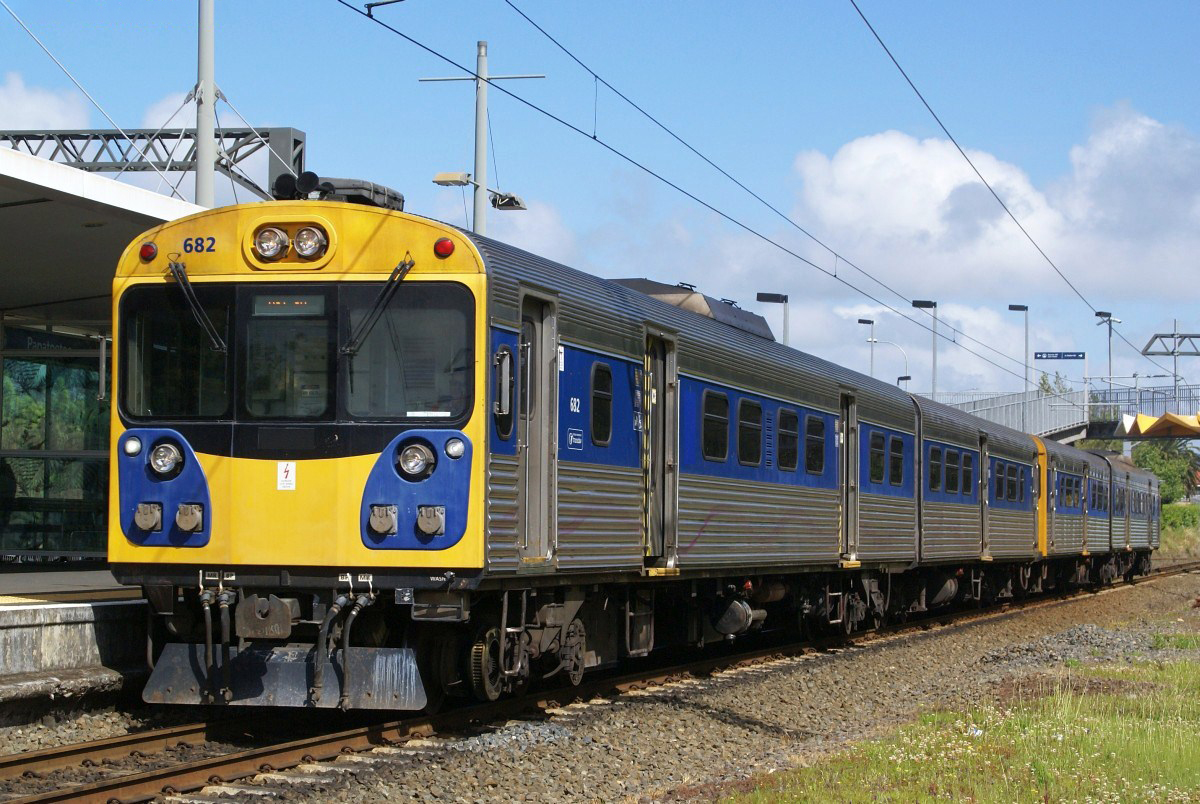
- ADK 682 on a Papatoetoe to Westfield service, during its farewell trip
- In service: Australia: 1967–1993, New Zealand: 7 April 1993 – 5 December 2014, Mozambique: 2017–present
- Manufacturers: ADK: Commonwealth Engineering; ADB: Western Australian Government Railways
- Built at: ADK: Granville; ADB: Midland Railway Workshops
- Replaced: Australia: WAGR Dd class & carriages : 56-foot carriages (SA class) Later replaced by the AM class
- Constructed: 1967–1968
- Entered service: Australia: 1968; New Zealand: 1993
- Refurbished: 2007
- Number built: 10 sets
- Number in service: 8 sets (running in pairs)
- Formation: Australia: ADK+ADB; New Zealand: ADK+ADB+ADB+ADK (originally ADK+ADB)
- Fleet numbers: ADK 681–ADK 690; ADB 771–ADB 780
- Capacity: ADK: 74, ADB: 64
- Operators: Australia: Western Australian Government Railways, Westrail; New Zealand: Tranz Metro, Transdev Auckland; Maputo, Mozambique: MetroBus
- Depots: Australia: Claisebrook; New Zealand: Westfield
- Lines served: Australia: Armadale; Fremantle; Midland; New Zealand: Eastern Line; Southern Line; Western Line

Specifications
- Car body construction: ADK: 20.20 m (66 ft 3 in); ADB: 15.85 m (52 ft 0 in)
- Train length: 37.75 m (123 ft 10 in) per two-car unit
- Car length: ADK: 21.09 m (69 ft 2 in) over couplers ADB: 16.66 m (54 ft 8 in) over couplers
- Width: 2.74 m (9 ft 0 in)
- Height: 3.92 m (12 ft 10 in)
- Floor height: 1.1 m (3 ft 7 in)
- Entry: 1.1 m (3 ft 7 in)
- Doors: Air-operated sliding doors, 2 pairs each side (ADK), one pair each side (ADB), 0.915 m wide
- Maximum speed: 90 km/h (56 mph)
- Weight: ADK: 33.3 t (32.8 long tons; 36.7 short tons); ADB: 15.8 t (15.6 long tons; 17.4 short tons)
- Prime mover: 2 x Cummins
- Power output: ADK: 2 x 155 kW (208 hp), one engine per bogie
- Transmission: Diesel-hydraulic
- Auxiliaries: ADB: diesel alternator in former cab (one per four-car set)
- HVAC: Heating only
- UIC classification: (1A)(A1)+2′2′
- Braking system: Electro-pneumatic
- Coupling system: Australia: Norwegian coupling NZ: Kidney link & pin
- Multiple working: Within class
- Track gauge: 1,067 mm (3 ft 6 in)

The ADK class are a class of diesel multiple units that were previously operated by Western Australian Government Railways (WAGR) in Perth, and later Transdev Auckland on Auckland's suburban rail network, and are currently operated by MetroBus in Maputo, Mozambique. Originally built by Commonwealth Engineering and the Midland Railway Workshops for WAGR in the late 1960s, all but one were sold in 1993 to New Zealand Rail, and were then owned by Auckland Transport. The units were completely withdrawn from service in New Zealand on 5 December 2014, following completion of electrification of Auckland's network.

== History ==
In 1967 and 1968, ten two-carriage stainless steel sets were manufactured for the Western Australian Government Railways. Each set consisted of an ADK power car manufactured by Commonwealth Engineering, and an ADB trailer built by the WAGR's Midland Railway Workshops. The ADK cars were manufactured in Granville and railed via Melbourne and Adelaide requiring a change of bogies at each of these locations and again at Kalgoorlie.

Following the electrification of the Perth rail network, they were rendered surplus and in 1992, all except ADK 689 were sold, along with the newer ADL/ADC class, to New Zealand Rail to replace 56-foot carriages on suburban trains in Auckland.

In October 1993, prior to being privatised, New Zealand Rail sold the class to the Auckland Regional Council (ARC). In 2004, the ARC funded an upgrade, which included refurbishment of the interiors, painting in the new MAXX blue colour scheme and mechanical improvements to extend their life by 10 years. After the upgrade, they ran as four-car rather than two-car sets. All were refurbished except ADB 773 (in use at Lock 'n' Load paintball arena) and ADK 689 (which was not exported to New Zealand). Westrail planned on converting ADK 689 to a self-propelled track inspection carriage but this did not eventuate.

Unlike the ADL/ADC class and SA sets, the units were not fitted with Electronic Train Protection (ETP) equipment, owing to their imminent replacement by the AM class. All are scheduled for withdrawal by late 2014.

As of 15 September 2014, all services on the Manukau Line are operated by the AM class. As a result of this, all ADK units were placed into storage. Services to Papakura formerly run by ADKs are now run by ADLs, also displaced from the Manukau Line. A farewell trip was run by the Railway Enthusiasts Society on 16 November 2014, running on every suburban line in Auckland. The units were completely withdrawn on 20 July 2015.

== Mozambique ==
In August 2017, eight units were shipped to Mozambique, with one unit being purchased by the New Zealand Special Air Services for training. The shipped units are now running in Maputo, Mozambique, operated by MetroBus on a commuter service from Maputo Central Railway Station to the suburb of Matola.
