= UGL Rail =

Australian railway rolling stock manufacturer

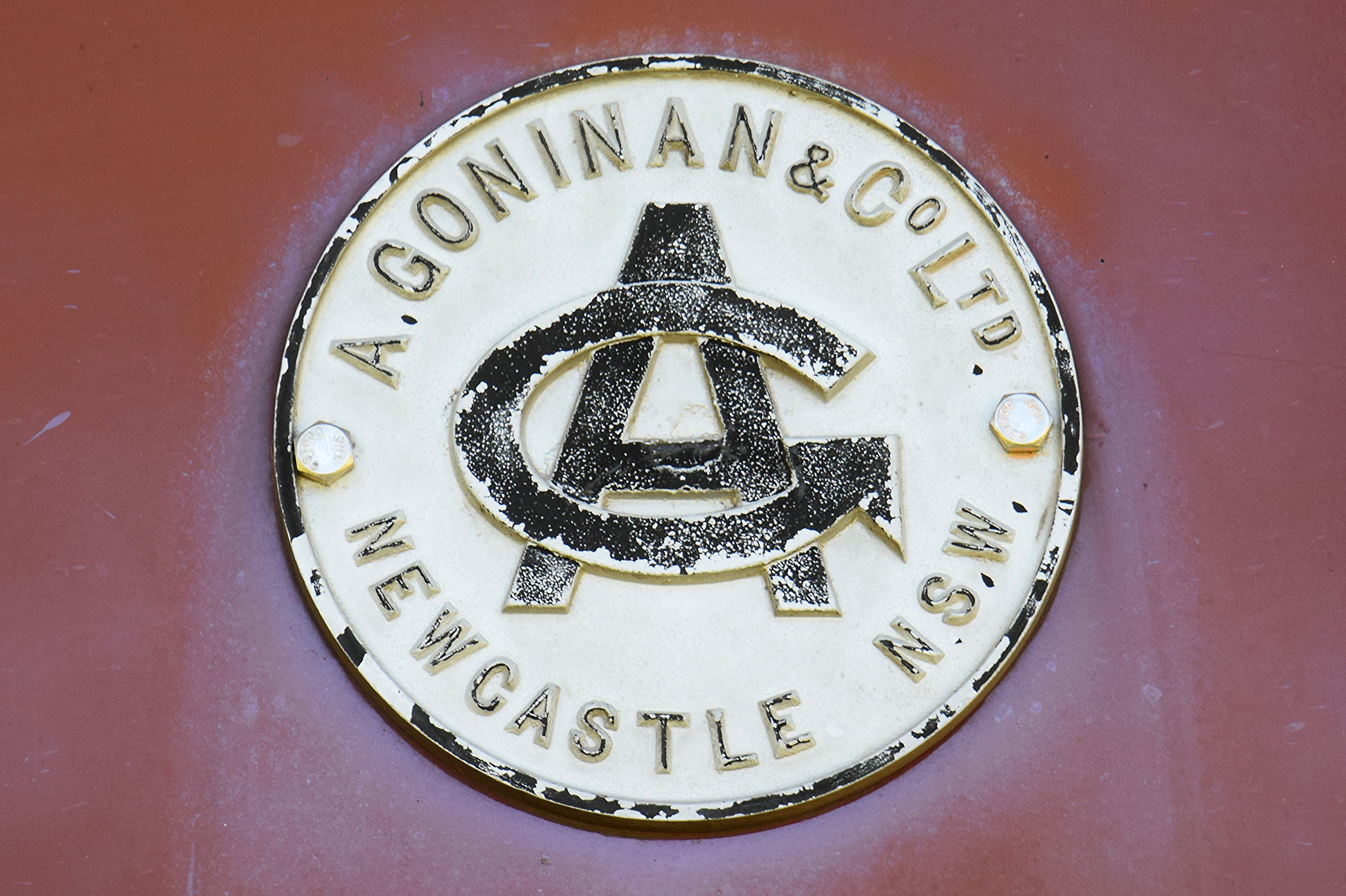
- Goninan maker's plate on a 43 class locomotive
- Formerly: A Goninan & Co Limited; United Goninan; United Group Rail
- Industry: Rail transport
- Founded: 1899; 127 years ago in Newcastle, New South Wales
- Founder: Alfred Goninan
- Parent: UGL

UGL Rail (formerly A Goninan & Co (/ɡəˈnɪnən/) is an Australian rail company specialising in building, maintaining and refurbishing diesel locomotives, diesel and electric multiple units and freight wagons. It is a subsidiary of UGL and is based in Melbourne, with a staff of 1,200 across Australia and Asia. It operates factories in Broadmeadow (Newcastle), Spotswood and Bassendean. While it used to operate a factory in Taree, the plant was shut down and the equipment sold off.

== History ==
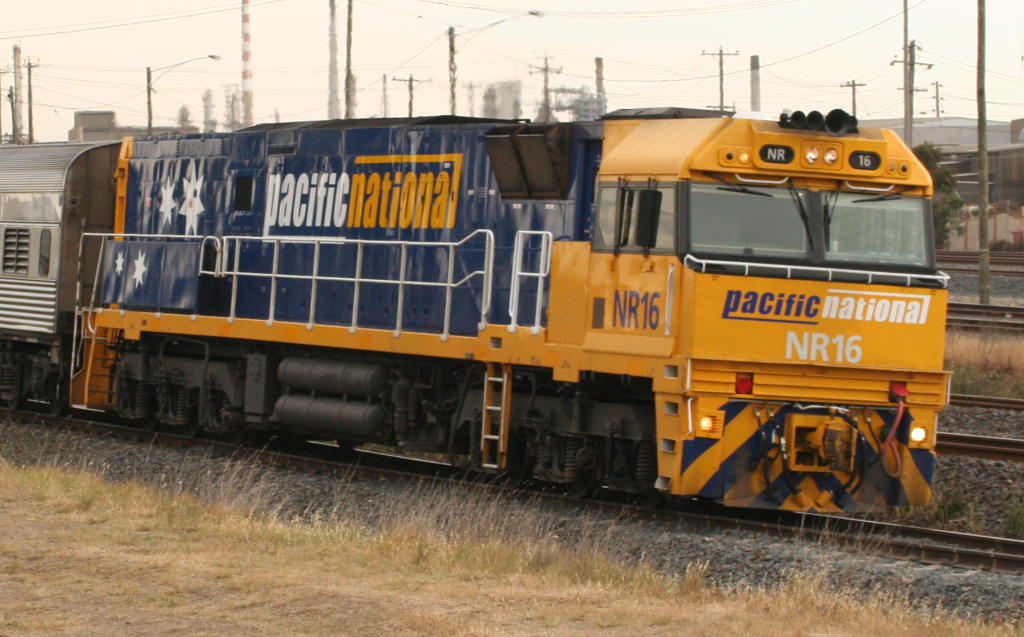
Pacific National NR class

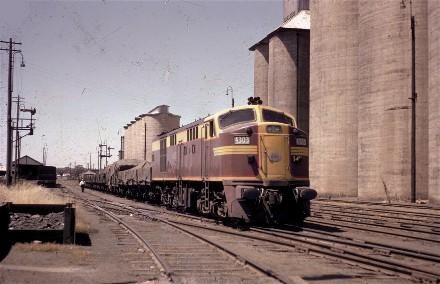
New South Wales 43 class

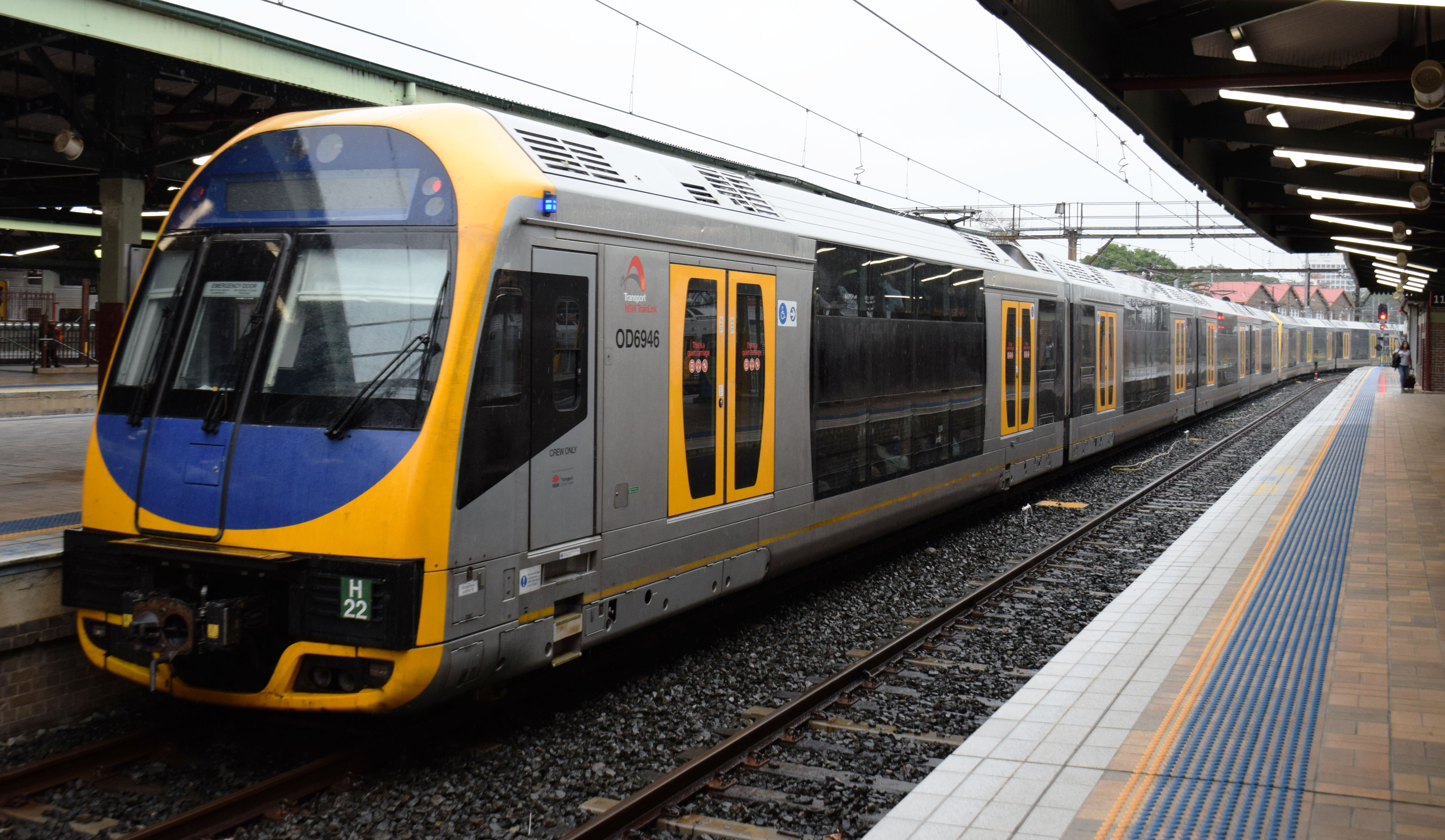
New South Wales H set

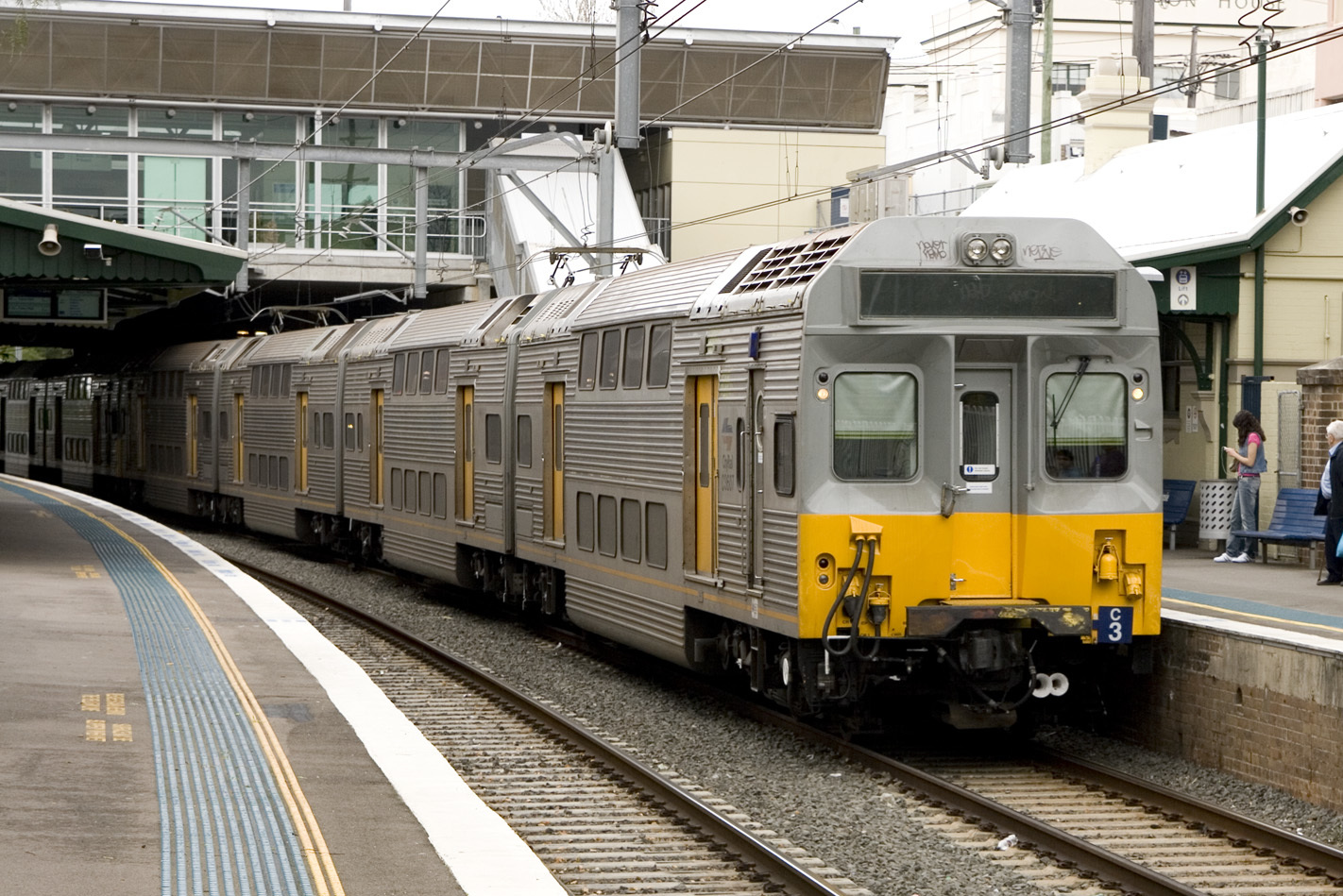
New South Wales C set

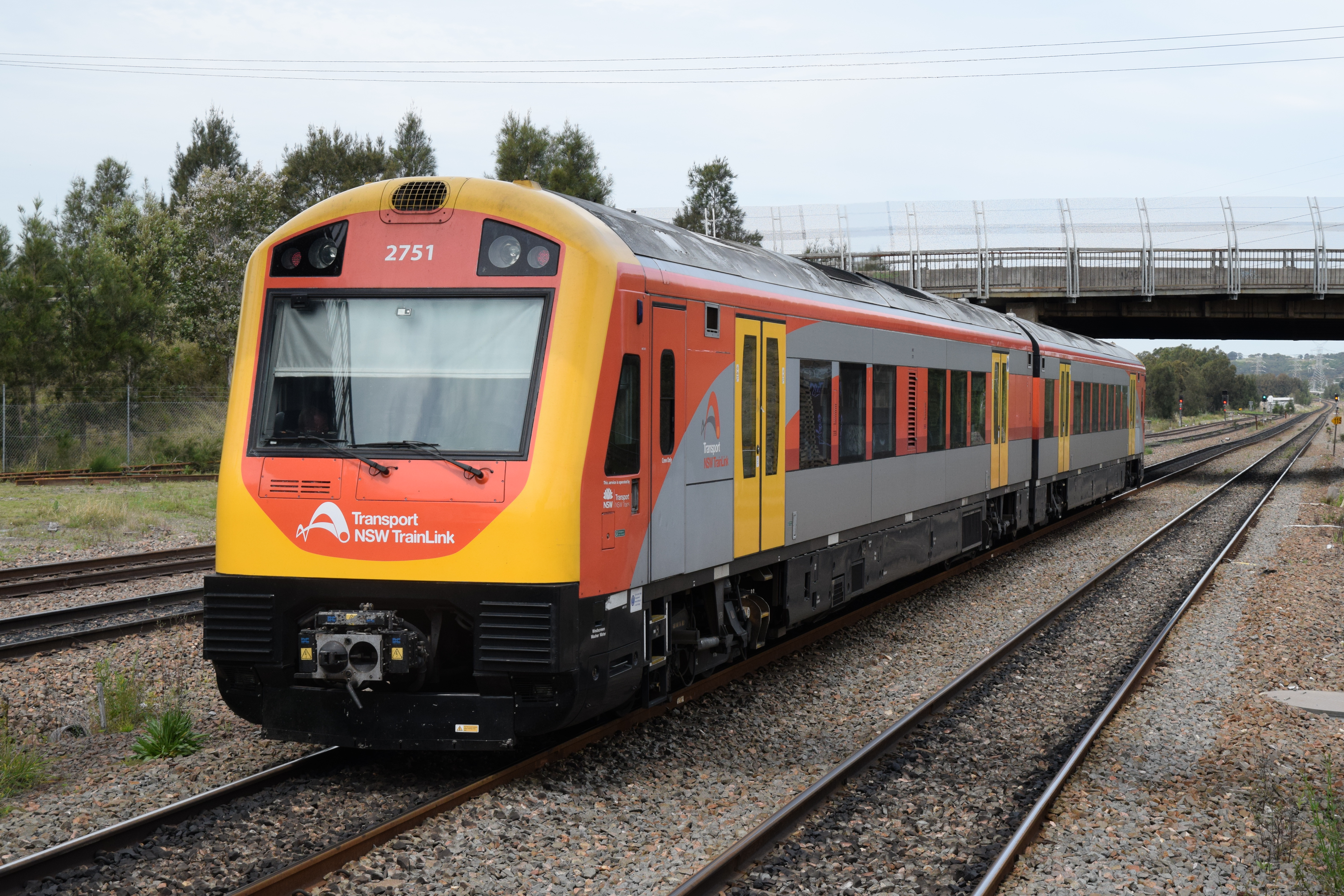
New South Wales Hunter railcar

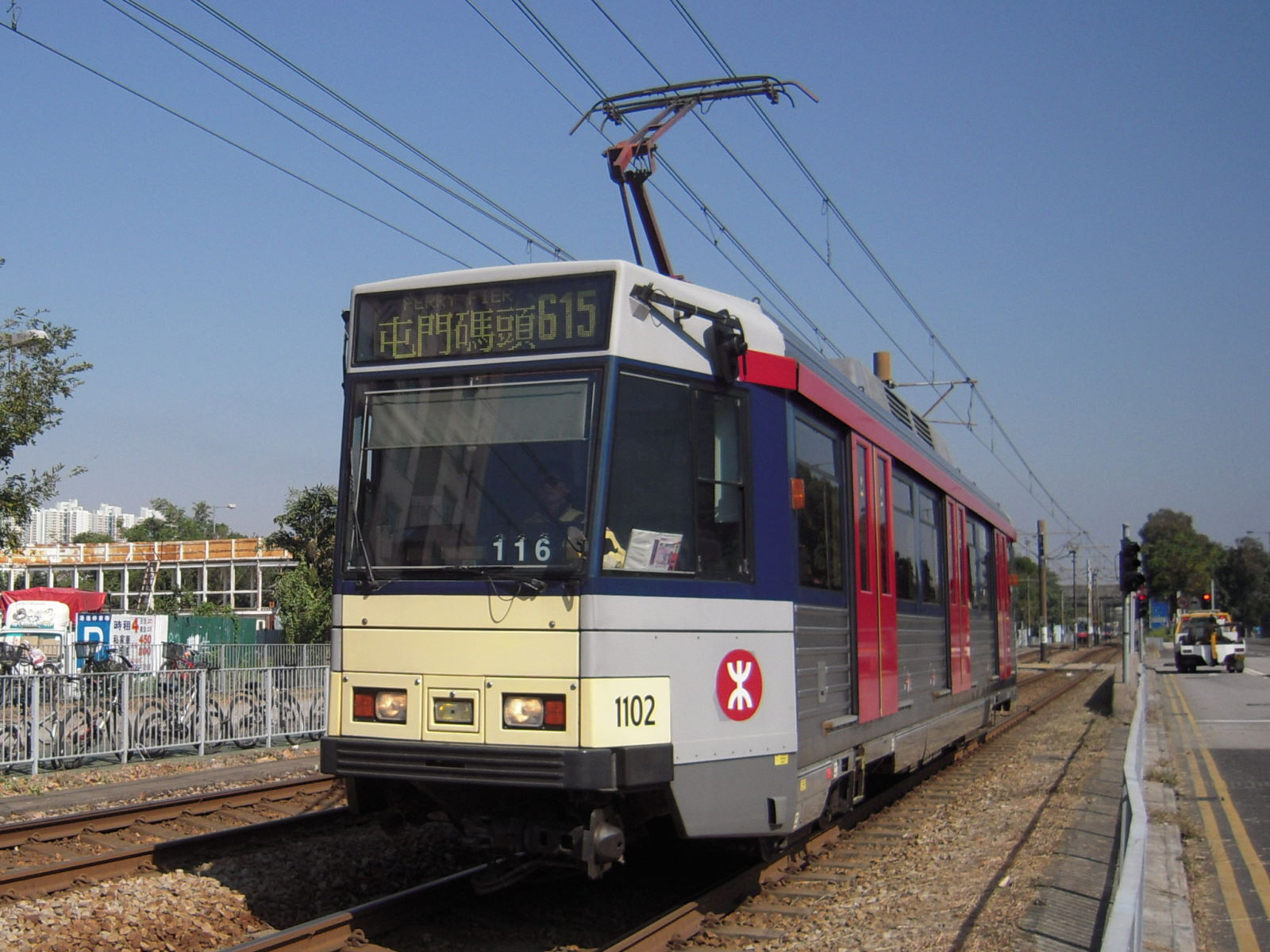
Hong Kong Light Rail Phase III LRV

Founded in Australia in 1899 by Cornish brothers Alfred and Ralph Goninan as an engineering and manufacturing company for the coal industry, A Goninan & Co Limited was incorporated as a public company in 1905.

It entered the rail business in 1917 via Commonwealth Steel Products Company of Waratah, Newcastle, a wheel and axle manufacturer, because those items could no longer be imported from Belgium due to World War I. A Goninan & Co moved to more convenient freehold land at Broadmeadow in 1919 and built a flourishing business in general engineering. It made pitheads, boilers, wagons and a huge, cast 41-ton block for the district's coal trade. In October 1964, A Goninan & Co was purchased by Howard Smith.

In August 1999, A Goninan & Co was sold to United Group and re-branded United Goninan. In 2005, it was renamed United Group Rail, as part of a reorganisation following United Group's purchase of Alstom's Australian subsidiary, Alstom Transport Australia and New Zealand.

== Factories ==
While most items were manufactured at Broadmeadow, it did purchase Comeng's Bassendean, Western Australia plant. This plant rebuilt many Pilbara Alco locomotives with General Electric components in the 1990s as well as building 17 Westrail P class and 60 NR class locomotives.

In 1983, a factory was established in Townsville to fulfill a contract for Queensland Railways 2600 class locomotives that required them to be built locally. It later built the 2800 class.

As part of UGL's acquisition of Alstom Australia and New Zealand in 2005, UGL leased Alstom's workshops at Ballarat North from then until 2012.

== Products ==
=== National ===
- 14 Australian National EL class diesel locomotives
- 120 National Rail NR class diesel locomotives
- 137 C44aci diesel locomotives

=== New South Wales ===
- 6 New South Wales 43 class diesel locomotives
- 20 New South Wales 47 class diesel locomotives
- 5 stainless steel power vans
- 150 S set (Goninan) EMU carriages
- 160 K set EMU carriages
- 56 C set EMU carriages
- 455 Tangara EMU carriages
- 196 Oscar EMU carriages
- 14 Hunter DMU carriages
- 12 QR National 5000 class diesel locomotives
- 19 QR National 5020 class diesel locomotives

=== Victoria ===
- 1 4D EMU carriages
- 22 V/Line Sprinter DMU carriages

=== Queensland ===
- 3 Queensland Railways 1150 class diesel locomotives
- 13 Queensland Rail 2600 class diesel locomotives
- 50 Queensland Rail 2800 class diesel locomotives
- 3 UGL Rail PH37ACmai diesel locomotives

=== Western Australia ===
- 20 Western Australia ADL/ADC class DMU carriages
- 17 Westrail P class diesel locomotives
- 9 Prospector/Avonlink DMU carriages
- 3 GE C36-7 diesel Locomotive, built in 1978 for Hamersley & Robe River railway

=== Hong Kong ===
- Refurbishment of 762 MTR Metro Cammell M-stock carriages for MTR
- Hong Kong Light Rail 20 Phase 3 LRV
- UGL and CSR Corporation Limited Hong Kong Light Rail 22 Phase 4 LRV (Design)

== New South Wales ==
=== Sydney Metro ===
UGL is a part of Metro Trains Sydney which constructed and now operates the Sydney Metro Northwest

=== New Intercity Fleet ===
UGL is a member of the RailConnect NSW consortium, a joint venture between UGL, Hyundai Rotem and Mitsubishi Electric, which has designed and will build and maintain more than 500 New South Wales D set train carriages. Delivery commenced in the second half of 2019. Maintenance will be carried out at the Kangy Angy Maintenance Centre.

=== UGL Unipart ===
UGL Rail has been responsible for the maintenance of all of Sydney Trains EMU fleet at Maintrain, Auburn since March 1994 following the closure of Electric Carriage Workshops and Eveleigh Carriage Workshops. In the early 1990s, A Goninan & Co refurbished S and V sets at Broadmeadow as part of the Citydecker program.

Since December 2011, UGL Unipart, a 70:30 joint venture with Unipart, has maintained most of CityRail and later Sydney Trains and NSW TrainLink's EMU fleet.

Maintenance on H sets was initially carried out at Eveleigh but from 2018 is done at other depots with major work done at Maintrain, Auburn as for other types of Sydney Trains sets. The contract to maintain 1,050 Sydney Trains carriages including H and V sets was extended for two years from 1 July 2019.

=== Country Regional Network ===
In January 2022, UGL Regional Linx (UGLRL) became responsible for operating and maintaining the NSW Country Regional Network (CRN) under a 10-year contract. It took over from John Holland Group.

== Metro Trains Melbourne ==
UGL Rail owns 20% of Metro Trains Melbourne, the consortium that has run Melbourne's metro railway network since November 2009.

== Adelaide ==
In July 2020, UGL Rail became responsible for maintenance of the Glenelg tram line in Adelaide as part of the Torrens Connect consortium.

== Auckland ==
In January 2022, Auckland One Rail, a conglomerate of UGL Rail and ComfortDelGro commenced an initial eight-year contract to operate trains on the Auckland suburban rail network, taking over from Transdev Auckland.

== See also ==
- List of oldest companies in Australia
