= Queensland Railways 1150 class =

Australian Co′Co′ diesel locomotives

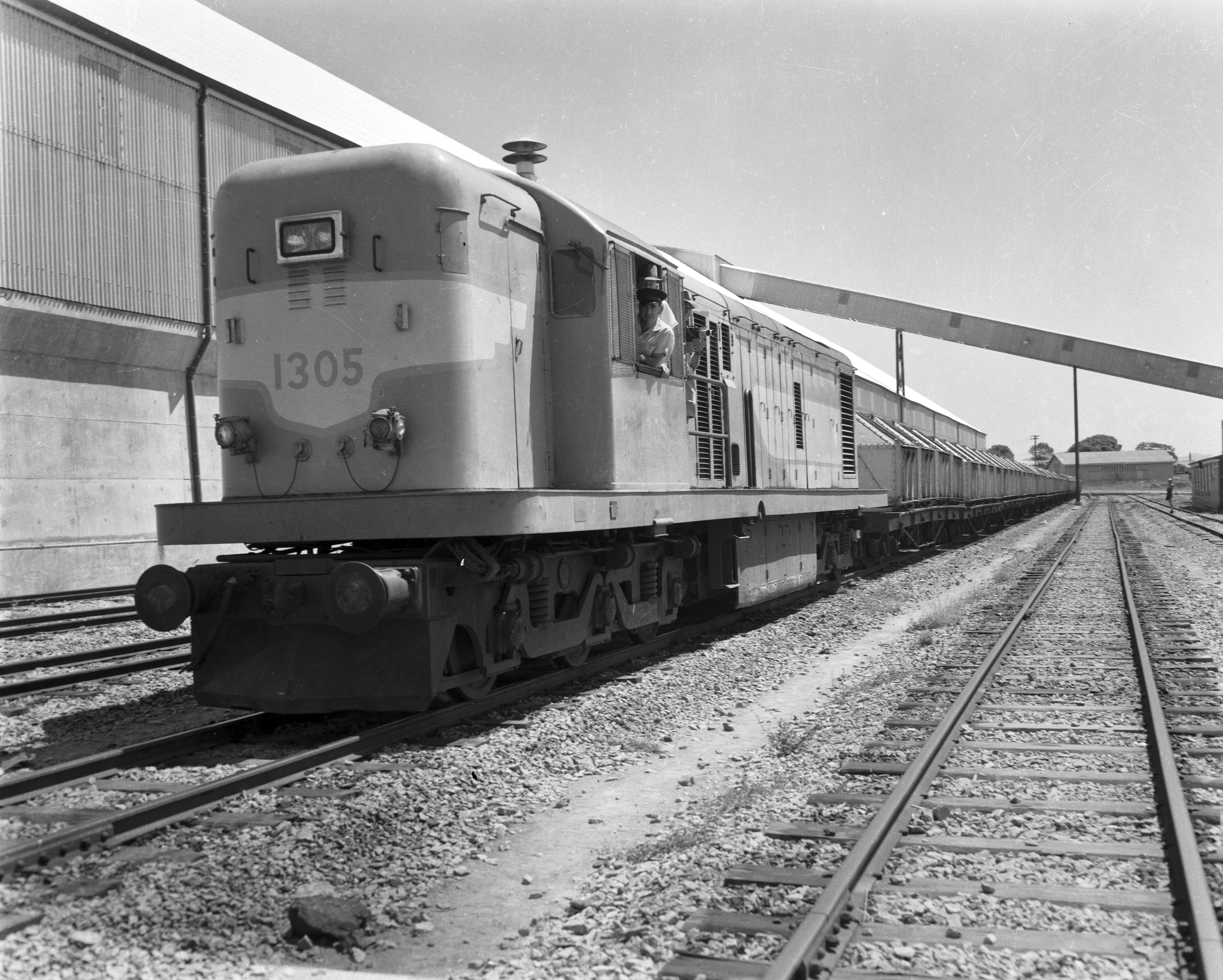
- 1305 (later 1155) with a sugar train at the Port of Townsville, c. 1962
Type and origin
- Power type: Diesel-electric
- Builder: GE Transportation; A Goninan & Co
- Model: U100T
- Build date: 1952–1956
- Total produced: 13
Specifications
- Configuration
  - UIC: Co-Co
- Gauge: 1,067 mm (3 ft 6 in)
- Length: 16.07 m (52 ft 9 in)
- Loco weight: 90 t (89 long tons; 99 short tons)
- Fuel type: Diesel
- Prime mover: Cooper Bessemer FVL12T
- Generator: General Electric GT587
- Traction motors: General Electric 756
Performance figures
- Maximum speed: 80 km/h (50 mph)
- Power output: 820 kW (1,100 hp)
- Tractive effort: 263 kN (59,000 lbf)
Career
- Operators: Queensland Railways
- Number in class: 13
- Numbers: 1150-1162
- First run: 6 November 1952
- Last run: 17 November 1987
- Preserved: 1150, 1159
- Disposition: 2 preserved, 11 scrapped

The 1150 class were a class of diesel locomotive built by GE Transportation and A Goninan & Co for Queensland Railways between 1952 and 1956.

== History ==
The 1150 class were the first mainline diesels purchased by Queensland Railways. Ten hooded locomotives built by GE Transportation, Erie, Pennsylvania, in 1952/53. They were initially numbered 1210–1219. In 1956 they were renumbered as the 1300 class. In 1956, an additional three were delivered by A Goninan & Co, Broadmeadow.

In 1962, 1306 became the first diesel locomotive in Queensland to log 1 million miles. In 1965, they were again renumbered as the 1150 class. They were initially used in the Darling Downs region to haul wheat, then on the North Coast line and the Western line. In the 1980s, the six remaining units were based at Townsville.

== Withdrawal & disposal ==
The first unit was withdrawn in 1975 with the final six withdrawn in 1987.

Two units have been preserved:

- 1150 is being restored by the Australian Railway Historical Society Queensland Division at Townsville
- 1159 is retained by the Queensland Rail Heritage Division at North Ipswich

== Fleet summary ==
Image	1210 class number	1300 class number	1150 class number	Builder	Model	Serial number	In service	Withdrawn	Scrapped	Notes
	1210	1300	1150	GE Transportation	U-100T	31090	6 November 1952	17 November 1987		Preserved
	1211	1301	1151	GE Transportation	U-100T	31091	18 November 1952	19 June 1979	September 1986	
	1212	1302	1152	GE Transportation	U-100T	31092	11 December 1952	16 November 1987	December 1990	
	1213	1303	1153	GE Transportation	U-100T	31093	11 June 1952	17 January 1977	December 1990	
	1214	1304	1154	GE Transportation	U-100T	31094	27 November 1952	18 November 1987	December 1990	
	1215	1305	1155	GE Transportation	U-100T	31095	21 November 1952	21 November 1975	June 1983	
	1216	1306	1156	GE Transportation	U-100T	31096	3 December 1952	16 November 1987	December 1990	
	1217	1307	1157	GE Transportation	U-100T	31097	30 January 1953	27 June 1986	September 1986	
	1218	1308	1158	GE Transportation	U-100T	31098	5 February 1953	3 September 1977	September 1986	
	1219	1309	1159	GE Transportation	U-100T	31099	3 February 1953	16 November 1987		Preserved
	-	1310	1160	A Goninan & Co	U-T100	M2013	28 April 1956	5 November 1986	December 1990	
	-	1311	1161	A Goninan & Co	U-T100	M2014	8 June 1956	22 August 1977	December 1989	
	-	1312	1162	A Goninan & Co	U-T100	M2015	19 June 1956	16 November 1987	December 1990	
