= Auckland Regional Transport Authority =

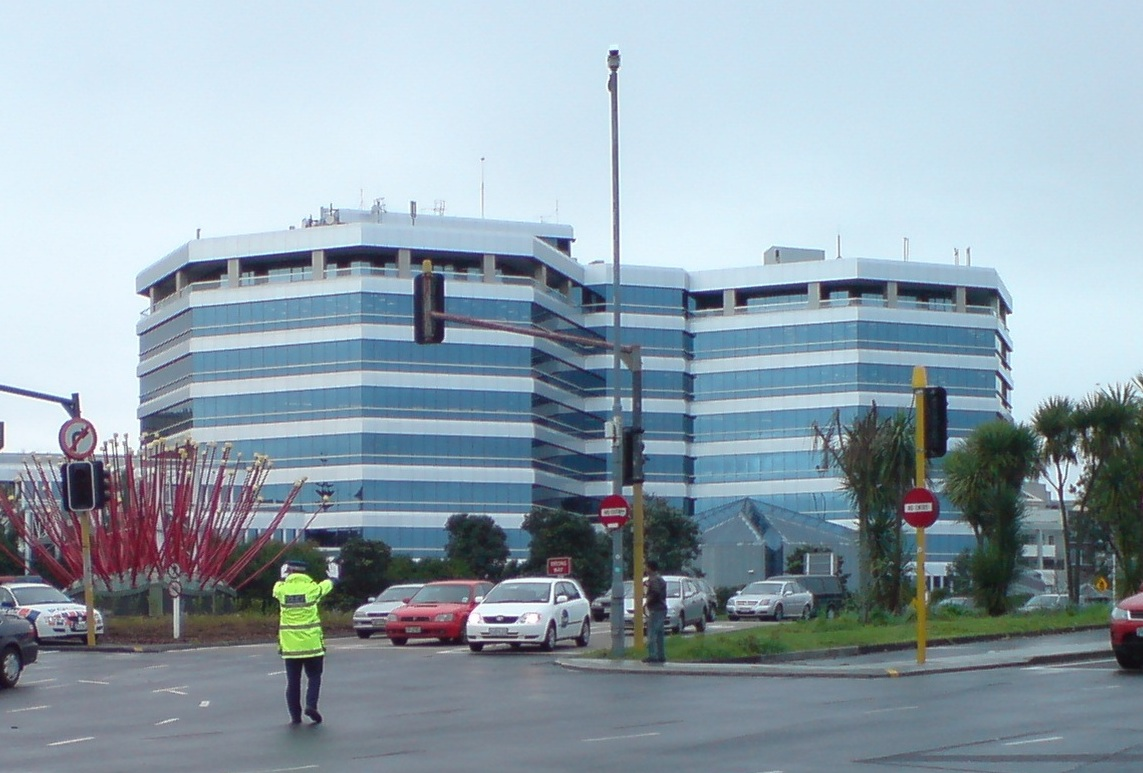
- ARTA was based in the Pitt Centre
- Type: Council-controlled organisation under the Auckland Regional Council
- Founded: 2004
- Headquarters: 21 Pitt St, Auckland, New Zealand
- Area served: Auckland Region
- Key people: Mark Ford (chair), David Warburton (CEO)
- Services: Transport planning and public transport agency for the Auckland Region
- Revenue: $263 million in 2007/08, mainly capital and operating grants from the Auckland Regional Council and NZ Transport Agency
- Owner: Auckland Regional Council
- Number of employees: 114
- Divisions: 4
- Website: www.arta.co.nz

The Auckland Regional Transport Authority (ARTA) was the central co-ordinating agency for transport (especially but not only public transport) in the Auckland Region of New Zealand from 2004 to 2010. In this role, ARTA provided public transport services, assigned funding and subsidies, and organised and advised on many aspects of regionwide transport. ARTA was under the control of the Auckland Regional Council (ARC) and was replaced by Auckland Transport on 1 November 2010.

== Functions ==
ARTA's roles included:

- Integrating transport planning in the Auckland Region, with a goal of an efficient and sustainable network providing modal choice
- Prioritising transport projects in Auckland and making recommendations on funding (especially since the NZ Transport Agency-related law changes of 2008)
- Operating the passenger rail network in Auckland in cooperation with KiwiRail, and improving stations, trains and maintenance facilities
- Designing and operating bus and ferry services
- Marketing passenger transport services under the MAXX brand
- Assisting Auckland schools and workplaces in fostering sustainable transport, such as by developing travel plans

About half of the ARC's rates went to fund public transport via ARTA.

== Establishment and dissolution ==
ARTA was established through the Local Government (Auckland) Amendment Act 2004 to take on the transport functions of the ARC along with new roles in transport planning and the prioritisation of transport funding.

The establishment of ARTA was one of a set of changes announced on 12 December 2003 in the Investing for Growth transport package. The package also announced significant new funding measures including a $900m Crown contribution to Auckland transport over 10 years.

Governance and funding of transport in Auckland was complex. The Royal Commission on Auckland Governance, set up in 2007, described then arrangements for transport in Auckland as:

A number of entities are involved in transport infrastructure in Auckland (road, rail, public transport). Central government agencies involved in planning and funding road and rail infrastructure include the Ministry of Transport (transport policy), Land Transport New Zealand (funding and safety management), Transit New Zealand (management and development of State highways), and ONTRACK (management and development of the rail network). Land Transport New Zealand and Transit will be replaced by the New Zealand Transport Agency from 1 July 2008. Regional entities involved in transport planning and public transport include the ARC, the Regional Land Transport Committee, and the Auckland Regional Transport Authority. In addition local councils own, build, and manage local roads (all roads that are not State highways).

On 1 November 2010, ARTA was superseded by Auckland Transport, a council-controlled organisation established to focus on delivering transport projects and services for the newly formed Auckland Council. Auckland Transport is responsible for local authority transport delivery functions inherited from the eight Auckland local authorities and ARTA including local roads and public transport.

== Planning and funding ==
The Auckland Regional Land Transport Strategy (ARLTS), prepared by the Auckland Regional Council, set out a vision for Auckland’s transport system, and a 10-year framework for working towards this vision. ARTA was required to give effect to the ARLTS, both through its own actions and by setting priorities for the funding of land transport activities in the Region.

ARTA achieved this by preparing the Auckland Transport Plan, and detailed implementation plans. Each year, ARTA prepared a Land Transport Programme setting out its recommendations for the funding of transport projects (excluding below-track rail infrastructure) in the Auckland region.

== Rail projects ==
KiwiRail undertook Project DART (Developing Auckland's Rail Transport network) in association with ARTA (now Auckland Transport) to upgrade Auckland's rail network, signalling and train station platforms and buildings. The budget for the project was $600 million, and included:

- Double-tracking the Western line as far as Swanson
- Redeveloping Newmarket station and the associated junction
- Improving signalling on all routes to allow more frequent services
- Building the Manukau Branch linking Manukau City Centre to the rail network
- Reopening the Onehunga Branch line

== Bus and ferry services ==
ARTA aimed to grow public transport patronage in Auckland by:

- Designing a simpler public transport network, linking people to the places they want to go, at times they want to travel
- Delivering fast, frequent, reliable services that fit conveniently into people’s busy lives
- Implementing world class stops, stations, and route branding

The Northern Busway in North Shore City is an example of a flagship project.

== See also ==
- Public transport in Auckland
- Transport in Auckland
- List of Auckland railway stations
- Transdev Auckland
