= ADL/ADC class diesel multiple unit =

Type of diesel railway vehicle

ADL/ADC class railcar
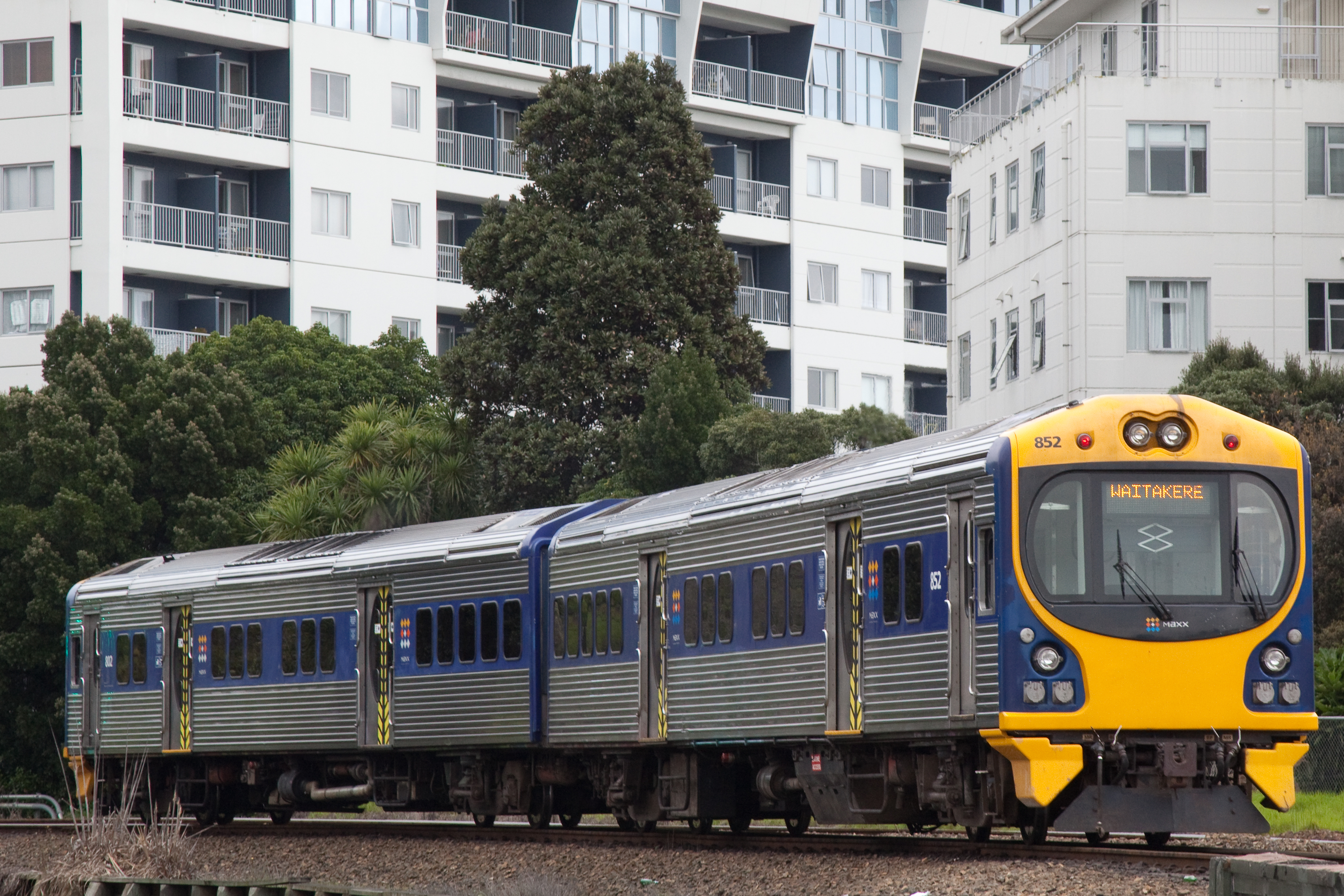
- A refurbished ADL/ADC near Britomart in 2009
- In service: Perth, Australia: 1982–1993, Auckland, New Zealand: 19 July 1993 – 12 August 2022
- Manufacturer: A Goninan & Co
- Built at: Newcastle
- Replaced: New Zealand: 56-foot carriages
- Constructed: 1981–1985
- Entered service: 1981 (Perth); 1993 (Auckland)
- Refurbished: 2002–2003, 2008, 2017–2019
- Number built: 10 sets
- Number in service: 0 sets
- Formation: ADL+ADC
- Fleet numbers: ADL 801–ADL 810; ADC 851–ADC 860
- Capacity: 132
- Operators: Westrail, Tranz Metro, Transdev Auckland
- Depots: Westfield, Pukekohe
- Line served: Southern Line (Papakura – Pukekohe)

Specifications
- Car body construction: 20.26 m (66 ft 6 in)
- Train length: 42.20 m (138 ft 5 in)
- Car length: 21.10 m (69 ft 3 in) over couplers
- Width: 2.74 m (9 ft 0 in)
- Height: 3.84 m (12 ft 7 in)
- Floor height: 1.12 m (3 ft 8 in)
- Doors: Air-operated sliding doors; two each side (four per car), 1.26 m (4 ft 2 in) wide
- Maximum speed: 90 km/h (56 mph)
- Weight: ADL: 42.97 tonnes (95,000 lb); ADC: 35.75 tonnes (79,000 lb)
- Prime mover: Cummins NT855 R4
- Power output: ADL: 2 x 205 kW (275 hp), one engine for each bogie
- Transmission: Voith
- Auxiliaries: ADC: diesel alternator
- HVAC: Heating & air conditioning
- UIC classification: Bo′Bo′+2′2′
- Braking system: Electro-pneumatic
- Coupling system: Australia: Norwegian coupling NZ: Kidney link & pin
- Multiple working: Within class
- Track gauge: 1,067 mm (3 ft 6 in)

The ADL class is a class of diesel multiple units that were last operated by Auckland One Rail on the suburban rail network in Auckland, New Zealand. Originally built in the early 1980s by A Goninan & Co for Westrail of Western Australia, they were sold in 1993 by Westrail's successor, Transperth, to New Zealand Rail for use on suburban services in Auckland. The units were withdrawn from service in Auckland in August 2022, and transported to Glenbrook Vintage Railway and Pukeoware depot for storage. The units are currently owned by Mainland Rail, and were moved to Christchurch in August 2025.

== History ==
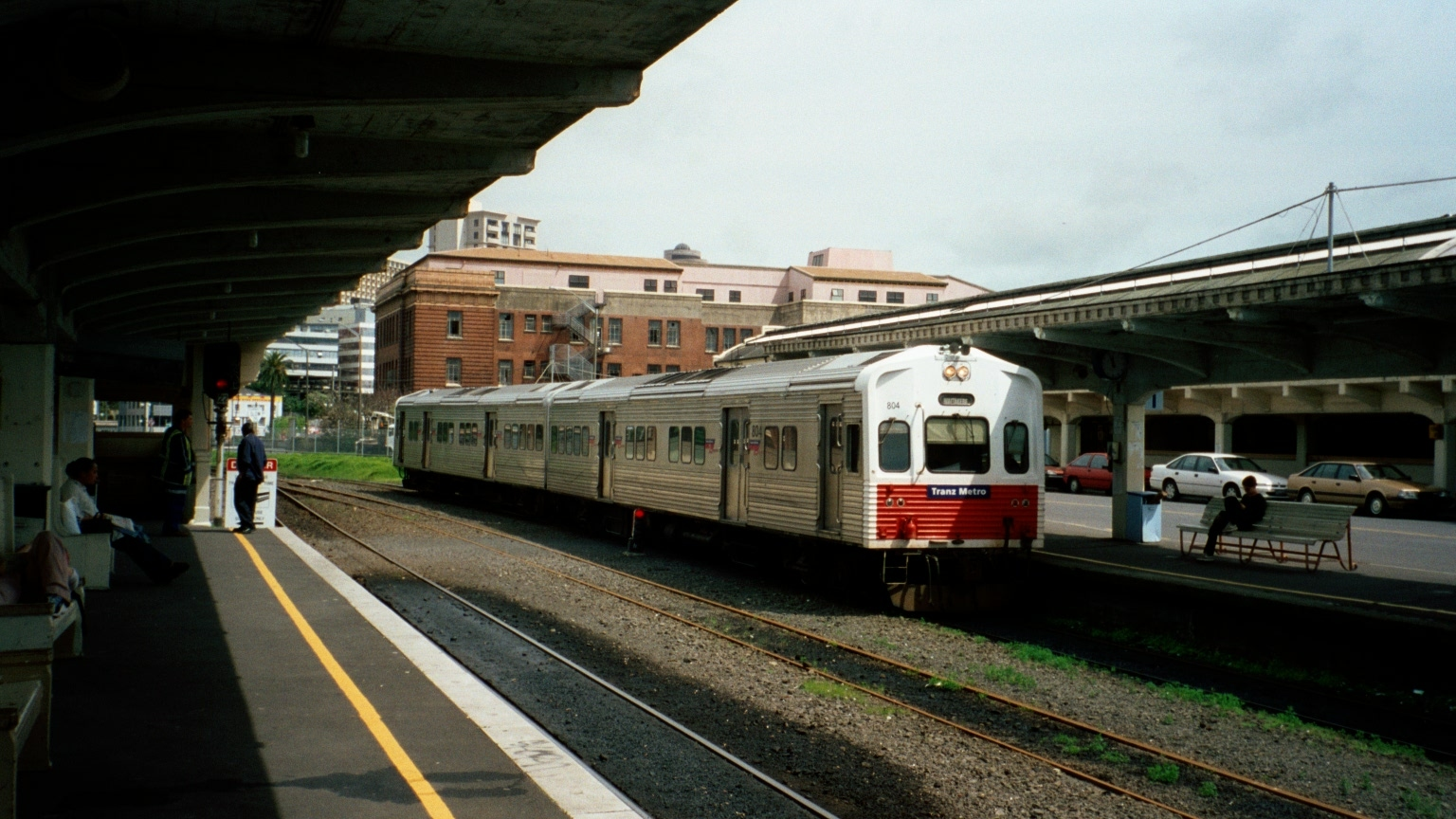
Unrefurbished ADL 804 at Auckland Railway Station, prior to 2003

Between 1981 and 1985, ten two-carriage stainless steel sets were manufactured for the Metropolitan Transport Trust and Westrail by A Goninan & Co, Newcastle.

Following the electrification of the Perth rail network they were rendered surplus and in 1993 all were sold, along with the older ADK/ADB class, to New Zealand Rail to replace locomotive-hauled 56-foot carriages on suburban trains in Auckland.

The units arrived in Auckland from Perth in April 1993. One unit went to Hutt Workshops in the winter of 1993 for staff familiarisation, while the other units were prepared for New Zealand service at Westfield locomotive depot.

As a result of the units' introduction, station platforms in Auckland needed to be raised.

In October 1993, prior to New Zealand Rail being privatised, the company sold the class to the Auckland Regional Council.

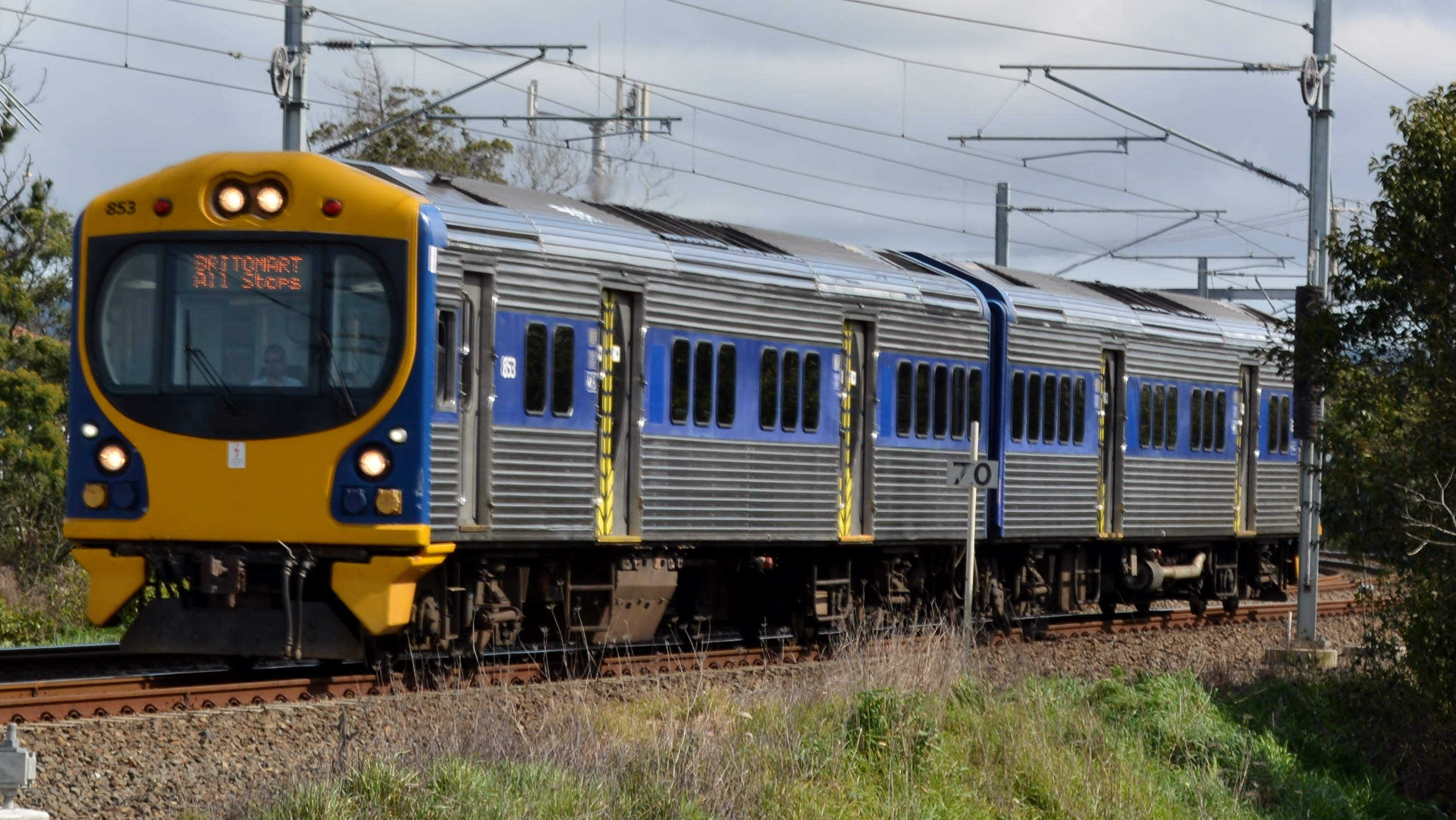
Refurbished ADL 853-803 near New Lynn, 2014

=== Upgrades and retirement ===
In 2002, the Auckland Regional Council funded an upgrade of the class, which included refurbishment of the interiors and painting in the new MAXX blue colour scheme. The first refurbished unit entered service in December 2002, the last in November 2003.

In 2011, Auckland Transport indicated four two-car sets would be retained after the Auckland rail electrification project is completed.

Due to the introduction of the AM class electric multiple unit on all of Auckland's suburban railway lines, the ADL/ADC units were retained only for use between Pukekohe and Papakura station as a shuttle service. This was due to that portion of the North Island Main Trunk not being electrified at the time. The diesel units were also used to provide service during power outages when electric trains could not operate.

In 2020, the government announced funding for electrification of this section, which once completed will render the ADL/ADC DMUs surplus to requirements. The ADL class were retired in August 2022.

Two out of service ADLs were transferred to Glenbrook Vintage Railway (GVR) for storage in 2021 to make space for new EMUs. The DMUs were hauled to GVR by the railway's own DBR1254, because KiwiRail were unable to provide motive power for the transfers. The remainder of the ADLs were also later relocated to GVR for storage.

=== Mainland Rail ===
On 9 August 2025, Mainland Rail announced it had purchased former Auckland Transport DMUs to be used for transporting people to Te Kaha Stadium during concert and sporting events, creating a "special events express". The first express service is expected to be for the April 2026 opening of the stadium, with the service carrying up to 5,700 passengers per event and travelling as far as Ashburton and Rangiora.
