= Westrail P class =

Class of Australian Co′Co′ diesel-electric locomotives

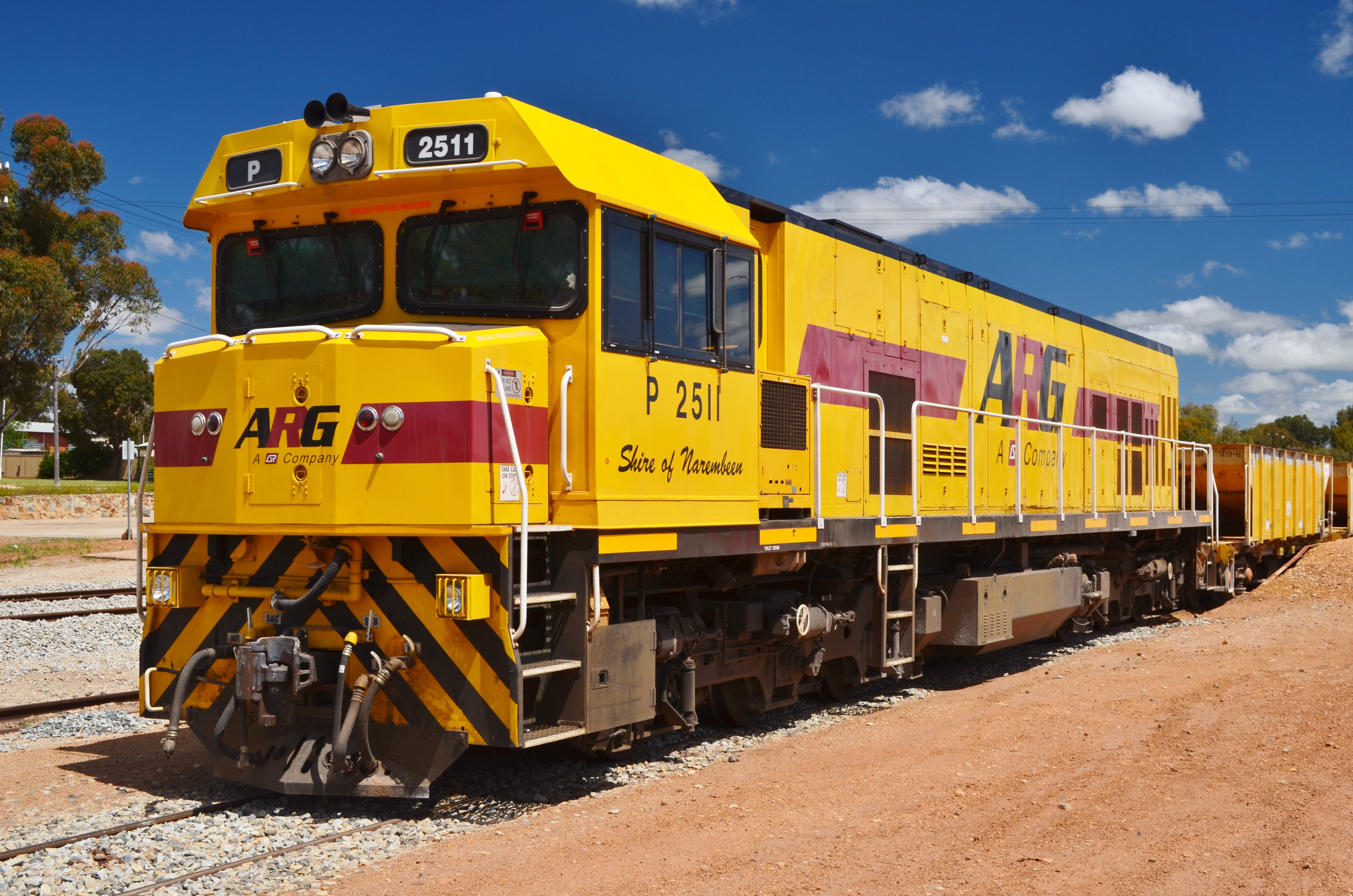
- P2511 at Goomalling in October 2013
Type and origin
- Power type: Diesel-electric
- Builder: A Goninan & Co, Bassendean
- Model: General Electric CM25-8
- Build date: 1989–1991
- Total produced: 17
Specifications
- Configuration
  - AAR: C-C
  - UIC: Co′Co'
- Gauge: 1,067 mm (3 ft 6 in)
- Loco weight: 98.5 t (96.9 long tons; 108.6 short tons)
- Fuel type: Diesel
- Prime mover: GE 7FDL-12J4
- Engine type: V12 diesel
- Alternator: GE GMC191A1
- Traction motors: GE 761
- Cylinders: 12
Performance figures
- Power output: 1,830 kW (2,450 hp)
- Tractive effort: 375 kN (84,000 lb_{f}) (starting); 286 kN (64,000 lb_{f}) (continuous)
Career
- Operators: Aurizon
- Number in class: 17
- Numbers: P2501–P2517
- Delivered: 8 December 1989
- First run: 1989
- Last run: 1991
- Current owner: Aurizon
- Disposition: 17 in service

The P class is a class of diesel locomotives built by A Goninan & Co in Bassendean for Westrail between 1989 and 1991.

== History ==
In 1988, Westrail placed an order for 15 CM25-8 Dash 8 locomotives for bulk grain and general freight haulage with A Goninan & Co. A 16th was later ordered followed by a 17th funded by AMC Mineral Sands.

In 1997, the class was fitted with Locotrol equipment to allow them to operate in top and tail formation.

All 17 locomotives, with the class redesignated as the 2500 class. In early 2014, all were included in the sale of Australian Railroad Group's Western Australian operation to Aurizon. All 17 in service.

== Status list ==
Westrail No	Aurizon No	Name(s)
P2001	P2501	Shire of Mingenew
P2002	P2502	Shire of Moora
P2003	P2503	Shire of Victoria Plains
P2004	P2504	Shire of Dalwallinu
P2005	P2505	Shire of Lake Grace
P2006	P2506	Shire of Quairading
P2007	P2507	Shire of Perenjori
P2008	P2508	Shire of Carnamah
P2009	P2509	Shire of Three Springs
P2010	P2510	Shire of Corrigin
P2011	P2511	Shire of Narembeen
P2012	P2512	Shire of Mullewa
P2013	P2513	Shire of Morawa
P2014	P2514	Shire of Wongan-Ballidu
P2015	P2515	Shire of Kulin
P2016	P2516	Shire of Coorow
P2017	P2517	City of Geraldton
