= Transdev Auckland =

Overview
- Owner: Transdev Australasia
- Locale: Auckland, New Zealand
- Transit type: Suburban rail
- Number of lines: 4
- Number of stations: 43
- Daily ridership: 93,000
- Annual ridership: 21.4 million (July 2019)
- Headquarters: Auckland

Operation
- Began operation: 2004
- Ended operation: 15 January 2022
- Number of vehicles: 65 train sets

Technical
- System length: 120 km (75 mi)
- Track gauge: 1,067 mm (3 ft 6 in)
- Electrification: 25 kV AC (Swanson to Papakura)

Transdev Auckland, formerly Veolia Transport Auckland, and Connex Auckland was a subsidiary of Transdev Australasia that ran Auckland's urban passenger trains under contract from Auckland Transport on infrastructure owned and managed by KiwiRail. Auckland Transport receives funding to subsidise these services from the NZ Transport Agency, which receives funding from road user taxes and Crown appropriations, and from the Auckland Council through rates.

Transdev also operates Wellington's commuter rail services as Transdev Wellington since July 2016.

== History ==
The previous operator of the train network in Auckland was Tranz Metro. When the Auckland Regional Council called for tenders for the new contract, Tranz Metro did not tender and Connex (later Transdev) won the tender. Transdev in a consortium with John Holland and CAF was shortlisted to bid for the next contract in 2021, but lost out to Auckland One Rail. Transdev Auckland ceased on 15 January 2022.

== Network ==
Transdev operated services on the following lines from Britomart (effective 12 March 2017):

- Eastern Line services run along the North Island Main Trunk (NIMT) via Glen Innes to Puhinui, then diverge onto the Manukau Branch to the Manukau terminus.
- Southern Line services run out of the Britomart tunnel on the NIMT, then the Newmarket Line to Newmarket, then the North Auckland Line to Westfield Junction (just north of Westfield - a station permanently closed since March 2017), and then the NIMT to Papakura, with a diesel train shuttle service between Papakura and Pukekohe.
- Western Line services run out of the Britomart tunnel on the NIMT, then the Newmarket Line to Newmarket, then the North Auckland Line via Henderson to Swanson.
- Onehunga Line services run out of the Britomart tunnel on the NIMT, then the Newmarket Line to Newmarket, then the North Auckland Line to Penrose where they diverge onto the Onehunga Branch to the terminus at Onehunga.

=== Rolling stock ===
==== At conclusion ====
Transdev operated the following rolling stock:

- 72 AM three-car EMUs (built by CAF) running on all lines since full electrification in July 2015 (except Papakura - Pukekohe shuttle)
- 8 ADL/ADC two-car DMUs (ex Transperth) owned by Auckland Transport

The AM class wear the Auckland Transport livery, and the ADL class wear the MAXX livery.

==== Former ====
Transdev operated the following rolling stock until full electrification in July 2015:

- 20 DC locomotives owned by KiwiRail, operating in push-pull mode with 20 sets of three or four SA cars and an SD driving car with driving cab and remote controls (ex British Rail Mark 2 carriages rebuilt for suburban service), owned by Auckland Transport. The carriages are stored at Taumarunui and the locomotives have returned to KiwiRail.
- 4 DFT/DFB locomotives owned by KiwiRail, operating in push-pull mode with six-car sets (five SA, one SD), now back with KiwiRail
- 9 ADK/ADB two-car DMUs, in storage

All diesel rolling stock and locomotive-hauled carriage stock is in MAXX Blue livery, except four locomotives which were in KiwiRail livery.
