= New South Wales 43 class locomotive =

New South Wales 43 class
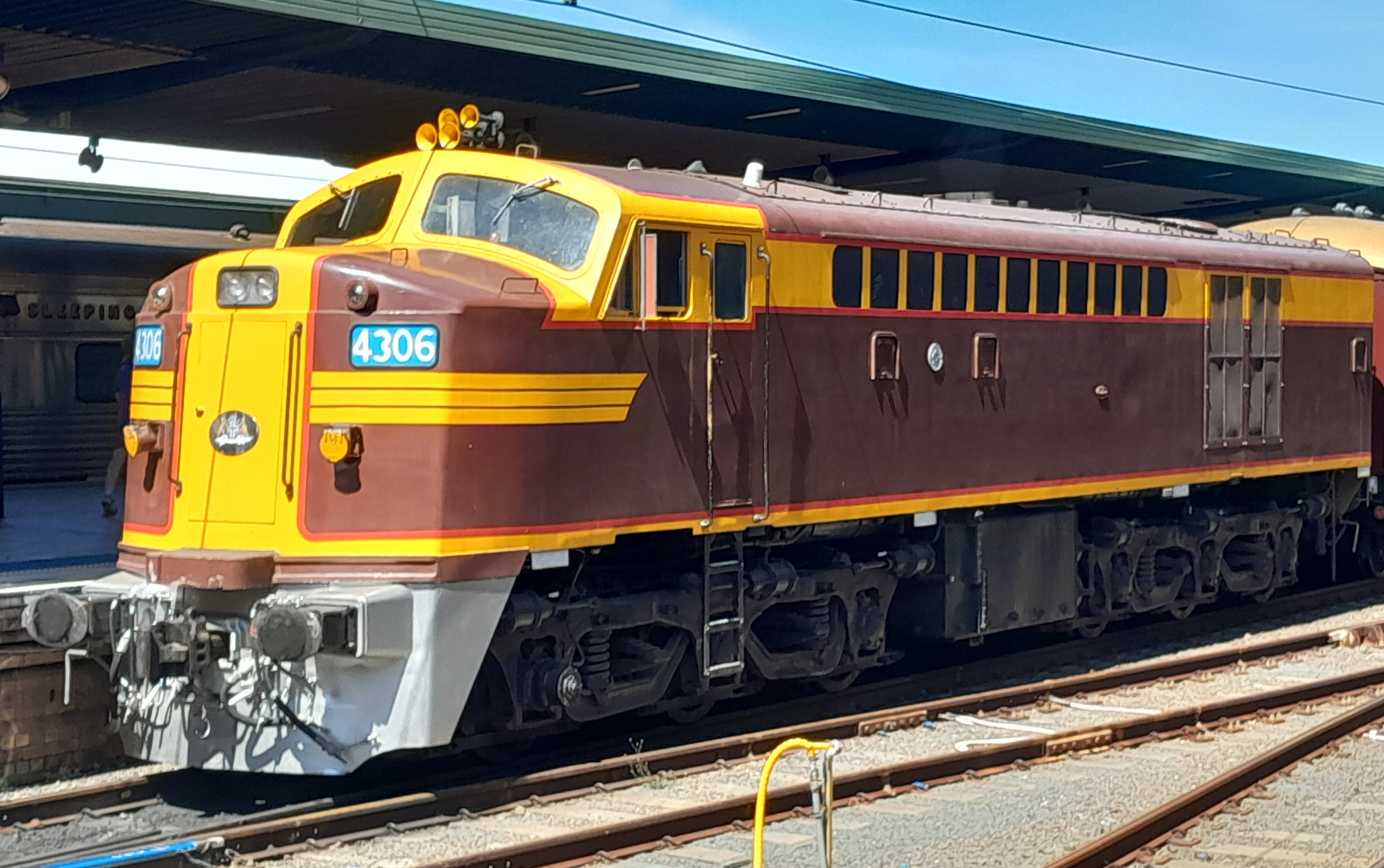
- Locomotive 4306 at the 2025 Transport Heritage Expo
Type and origin
- Power type: Diesel-electric
- Builder: A Goninan & Co
- Order number: ALCO-GE UM118T
- Build date: 1956–1957
- Total produced: 6
Specifications
- Configuration
  - UIC: Co-Co
- Gauge: 4 ft 8 1/2 in (1,435 mm) standard gauge
- Wheel diameter: 40 in (1,016 mm)
- Length: Over headstocks: 53 ft 10 1/4 in (16.41 m), Over coupler pulling faces: 56 ft 8 1/4 in (17.28 m)
- Width: 9 ft 7 in (2.92 m)
- Height: 13 ft 9 1/4 in (4.20 m)
- Axle load: 17 long tons 11 cwt (39,300 lb or 17.8 t)
- Loco weight: 105 long tons 10 cwt (236,300 lb or 107.2 t)
- Fuel type: Diesel
- Fuel capacity: 1,165 imp gal (5,300 L; 1,399 US gal)
- Lubricant cap.: 167 imp gal (760 L; 201 US gal)
- Coolant cap.: 208 imp gal (950 L; 250 US gal)
- Sandbox cap.: 22 cu ft (0.62 m^{3})
- Prime mover: Alco 244
- RPM range: 350–1000
- Engine type: Four-stroke, V12 diesel
- Aspiration: Turbocharged
- Generator: General Electric 5GT 581
- Traction motors: General Electric 761, 6 of
- Cylinders: 12
- Cylinder size: 9 in × 10.5 in (229 mm × 267 mm)
- Train brakes: Dynamic
Performance figures
- Maximum speed: 71 mph (114 km/h)
- Power output: Gross: 1,750 hp (1,300 kW), For traction: 1,600 hp (1,190 kW)
- Tractive effort: 42,900 lbf (190.83 kN) at 11 mph (18 km/h)
Career
- Operators: NSW Department of Railways
- Number in class: 6
- Numbers: 4301–4306
- First run: 26 September 1956
- Last run: 2 October 1979
- Preserved: 4306
- Disposition: 1 preserved, remainder scrapped

The 43 class are a class of Australian diesel locomotives built by A Goninan & Co, Broadmeadow for the New South Wales Department of Railways in 1956–1957.

== Construction ==
The class of six locomotives was built by A Goninan & Co, Broadmeadow, as sub-contractor to Australian Electrical Industries.

These locomotives were unique in Australia in having Alco power units in GE Transportation Systems designed bodies, a legacy of the former Alco-GE partnership which was dissolved in 1953. Although their design originated in the United States, only two similar UM20 cab and two booster units were ever built in that country, for the Union Pacific and Erie Railroads.

== Operation ==
The 43 class were initially used on the Main Western line from Sydney to Orange, prior to electrification of the line to Lithgow in June 1957, appearing regularly on the Central West Express. Subsequently, they were transferred to Broadmeadow Locomotive Depot operating from Gosford to the Queensland border via both the North Coast and Main North lines. They also saw service on the Main South line.

The 43 class were not popular with the train crews, but they did pave the way for a long line of Alco-powered locomotives. They did receive some improvements in the late 1950s with water cooling of the turbo-superchargers replacing the air-cooled units.

== Demise ==
In August 1974, 4301 was taken into Chullora Workshops for a regular overhaul, however a decision was made to use it as spares for the remaining units.

The last was withdrawn in October 1979 with 4306 placed by the Public Transport Commission in the custody of the NSW Rail Museum. It is now a designated NSW heritage item. It was transferred to Thirlmere in March 1980.

In 1986, the Illawarra branch of the Rail Transport Museum commenced overhauling 4306 at Yallah. The locomotive returned to traffic in June 1996 and has since been used extensively on charters in New South Wales as well as interstate to Brisbane and Melbourne.

== Fleet Status ==
Number	Image	Status	Notes
4301		Scrapped	
4302		Scrapped	
4303		Scrapped	
4304		Scrapped	
4305		Scrapped	
4306		Operational	Preserved, owned by Transport Heritage NSW, located at NSW Rail Museum, Thirlmere
