= Northern Busway, Auckland =

Busway in Auckland, New Zealand

Northern Busway
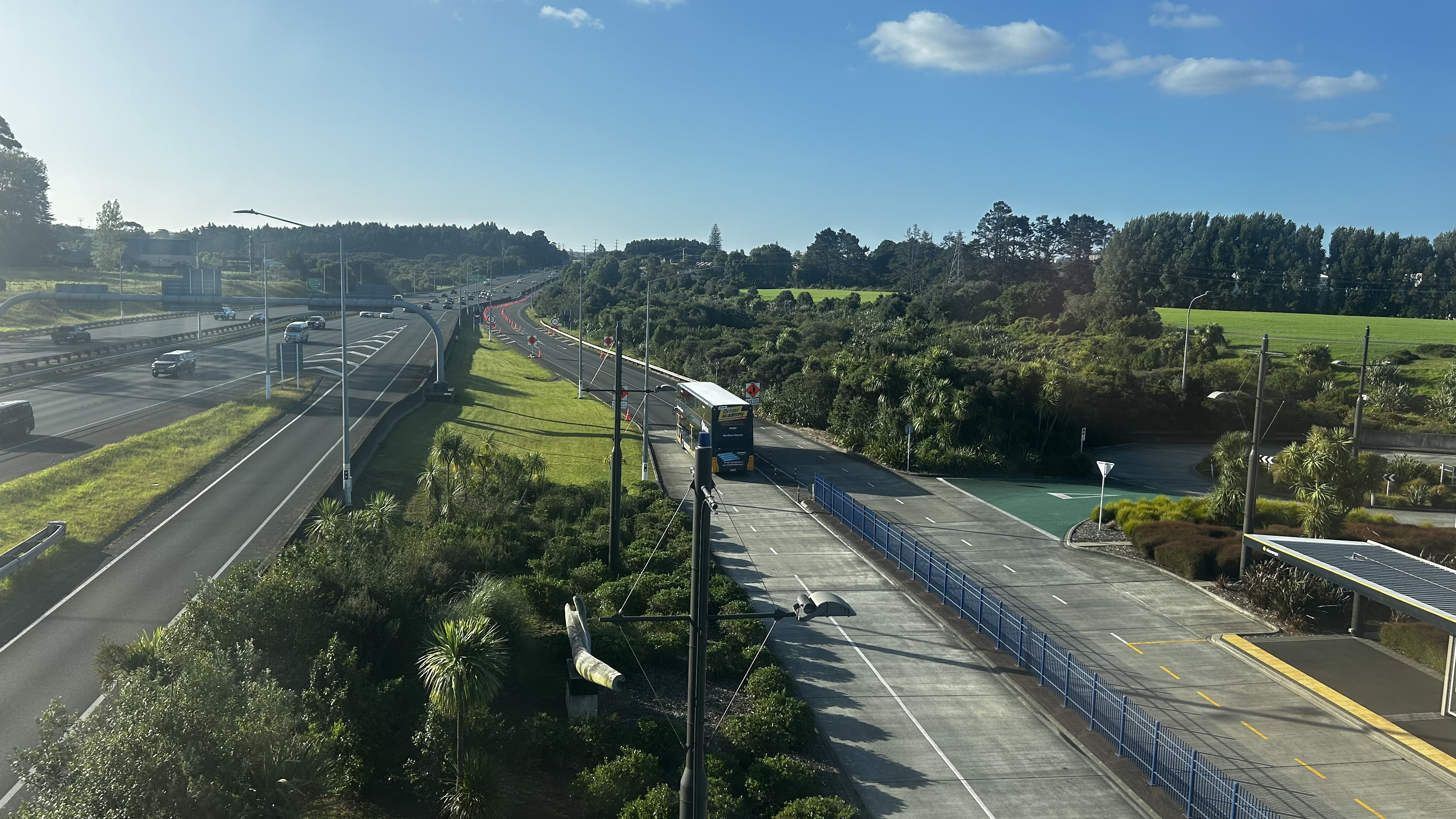
- The Northern Busway (right) adjacent to Akoranga station

Overview
- Status: Open
- Owner: Auckland Transport
- Locale: North Shore, Auckland
- Termini: Albany (Busway lanes), Hibiscus Coast (Routes on motorway); Akoranga
- Stations: 6

Service
- Type: Bus rapid transit
- System: AT Buses
- Services: NX1, NX2, 83, 866
- Operator(s): Ritchies Transport; Tranzit Group (Tranzurban Auckland)

History
- Opened: 2008
- Last extension: 2022

Technical
- Operating speed: 80 km/h (50 mph)

Map

The Northern Busway is a segregated bus rapid transit route that runs along the eastern side of the Auckland Northern Motorway, part of State Highway 1, in the north of Auckland, New Zealand, linking the North Shore with the northern end of the Auckland Harbour Bridge. As of May 2022, the busway consists of two-way lanes running between Albany Station and Akoranga Station, and from Akoranga Station a southbound-only lane that joins the Harbour Bridge approaches just south of the Onewa Road on-ramp system. The busway previously ended at Constellation before an extension to Albany was constructed in 2022.

Six stations provide access points for passengers to board; some stations have park and ride parking spaces; others have drop off and pick up zones only.

City-bound Northern Express (NX1 and NX2) services commence from Hibiscus Coast Station or Albany Station; from Albany, the lanes reduced travel time to Waitematā station from around one hour by car during peak hours to about half an hour by bus. In the reverse direction, NX1 and NX2 services leaving the city travel north to the Akoranga off-ramp, cross over the motorway, and enter Akoranga Station, from where they travel north on the busway lanes. The busway lanes are also an important transport link within the North Shore, where they are the spine of the bus-based public transport system.

== History ==
=== Background ===
Prior to 2000, indicative scheme and station planning was undertaken by International Transport Planning Consultants (McCormick Rankin International) who were engaged by Serco on behalf of Transit.

In 2000, the North Shore Busway Office was established with a team to focus both on the overall scheme as well as the station components. This reflected the nature of the proposed funding. McCormick Rankin undertook refined schematic design and the Busway Team focused on the community consultation and funding programmes. Original plans included a Northcote Point station proposed for Stafford Road, which Northcote residents lobbied against, and was removed from the plan in December 2000.

The ARC held a regional Station Theming Design Competition in 2001 to select a consultant to develop a Theming Manual for application across all major public transport stations to the Auckland Region. This provided a distinctive design signature to the region visually linking all public transport facilities. MARIO MADAYAG/Jasmax Architects were selected as winners for the competition with part of their benefit being their commission on this concept design exercise. The ARC separately engaged MARIO MADAYAG/Jasmax to develop the Theming Manuals within the set parameters of that project. The project ran in parallel with the busway station concept design exercise but was heavily integrated as the pedestrian overbridge, stair lift towers and waiting enclosure developed concepts for the Busway were integrated with the Theming Manual.

=== Concept, design and construction ===
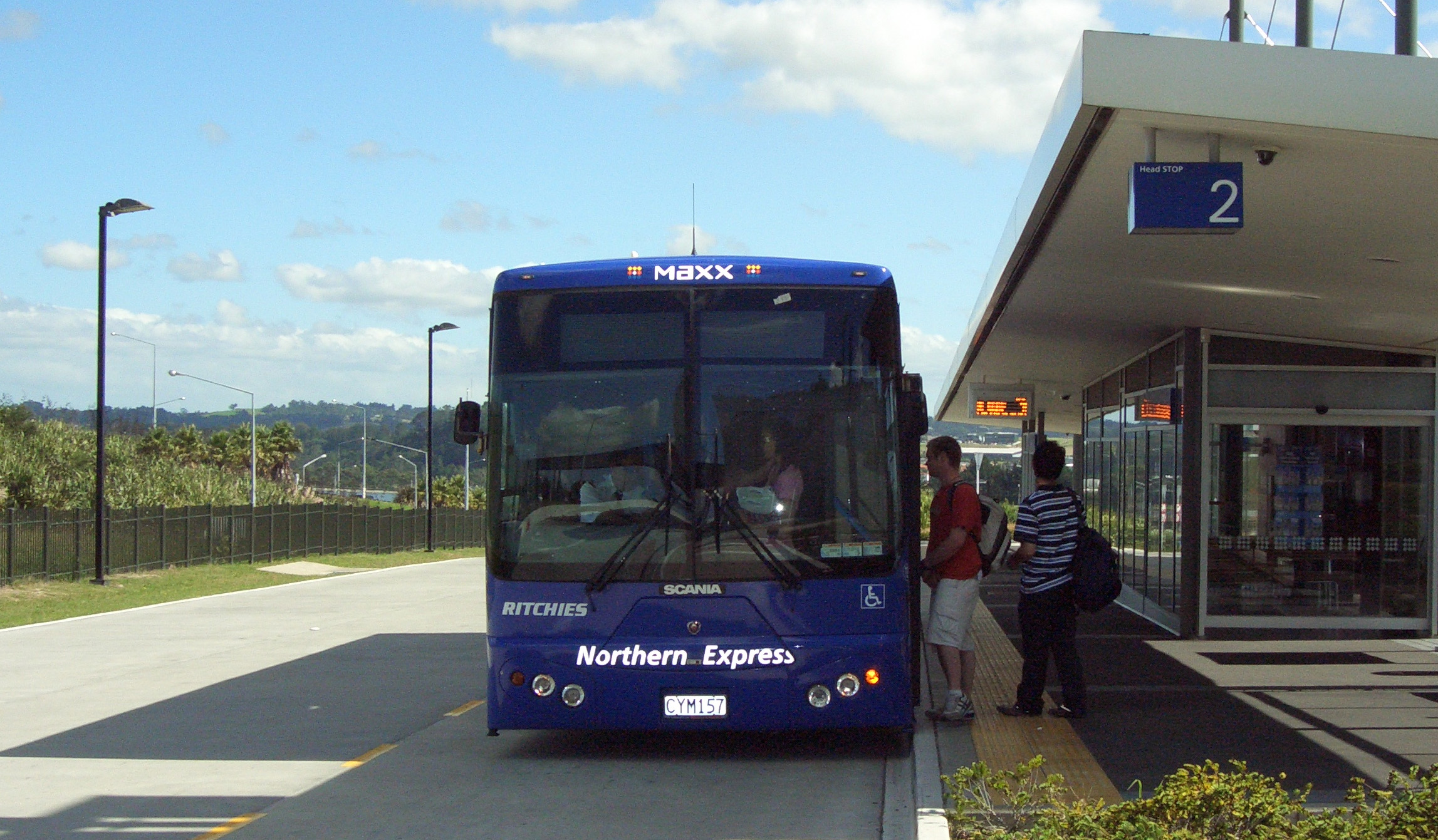
Passengers boarding a Maxx-branded Northern Express service operated by Ritchies Transport in 2008

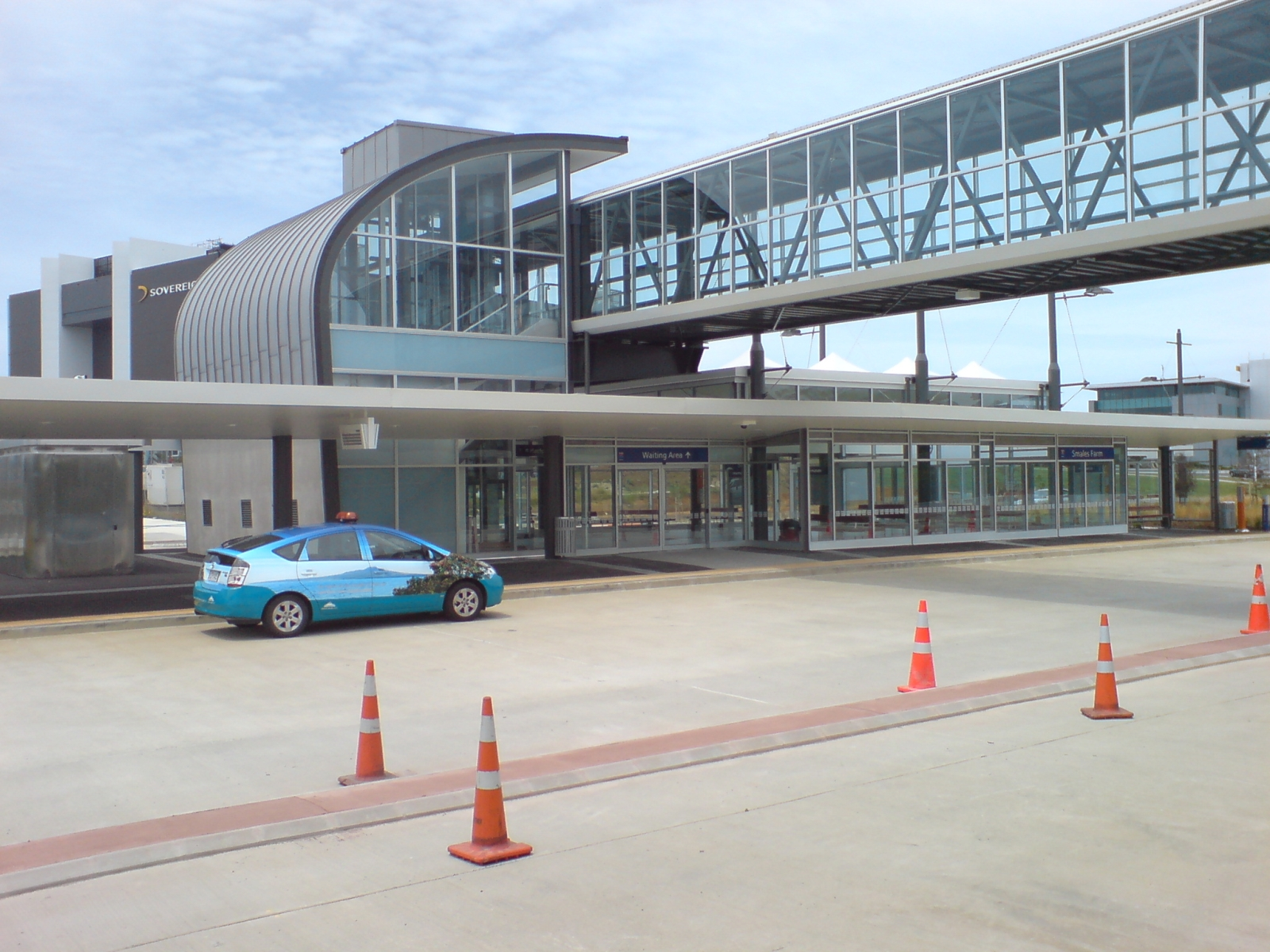
Smales Farm Station, shortly before the busway opening

Concept design for the busway was developed by MRCagney (formerly McCormick Rankin Cagney), with detailed design and consultation completed by Mario Madayag Architecture, Jasmax, Beca Group, Opus and Connell Wagner. Fletcher Construction was responsible for construction. Akoranga, Smales Farm, and Sunnynook stations were built by NZ Strong Construction.

Difficulties encountered included the nearby residential areas, the predominantly soft ground, and environmental efforts to protect New Zealand dotterel breeding grounds. Construction employed around 300 people at its peak, with around a million man-hours being invested, including shifts during 512 nights.

A proposed station at Onewa was cancelled after local residents petitioned and protested against the scheme – claiming that it would increase traffic on neighbourhood streets.

=== Operation ===
The busway was officially opened in February 2008 after several years of construction, though the Albany and Constellation stations had been operating since December 2005 using the normal Northern Motorway lanes. It was credited with reducing peak traffic on the Northern Motorway by around 500 cars each rush hour one month after opening, and about 39% of passengers on the Northern Express bus service had never used public transport before. The busway was initially used by 70 buses per hour during peak time.

In 2008, the busway received the 'Shell Bitumen Excellence Award for a Major Roading Project' and the 'Roading New Zealand Supreme Award'. In June 2009, it received the Ingenium 'Excellence Award' (in the category for projects above NZ$2 million construction cost).

In June 2010, the busway carried its 5 millionth passenger and was estimated to remove the equivalent of about 5,100 cars in the morning peak, with 80 buses per hour during peak times.

By mid-2011, frequency of the Northern Express had risen to every three minutes during the morning peak hour, five minutes during the 'shoulder peak'.

In 2015, some Northern Express services were extended to Hibiscus Coast busway station (formerly named Silverdale Park and Ride).

In 2017, Auckland Transport's projections indicated that the busway would reach maximum capacity in 2026, twenty years earlier than originally expected. AT's report said that increased patronage would "manifest in overcapacity conditions and poor operational performances" at Albany, Sunnynook and Akoranga stations. AT was investigating a range of improvements, including lengthening station platforms. A decision on a timeline for conversion of the busway to a rail link was expected to be announced before the end of 2017. In the 12 months to December 2018, the busway carried nearly 6 million passengers.

In May 2022 the extension of the busway between Constellation and Albany was opened.

=== Funding ===
The busway became fully operational in 2009, with some final sections being completed with little publicity, for around NZ$290–294 million: $210 million for the busway and $84 million for the stations. The project was funded by Transit New Zealand, ARTA, Auckland City Council and North Shore City Council.

== Infrastructure ==
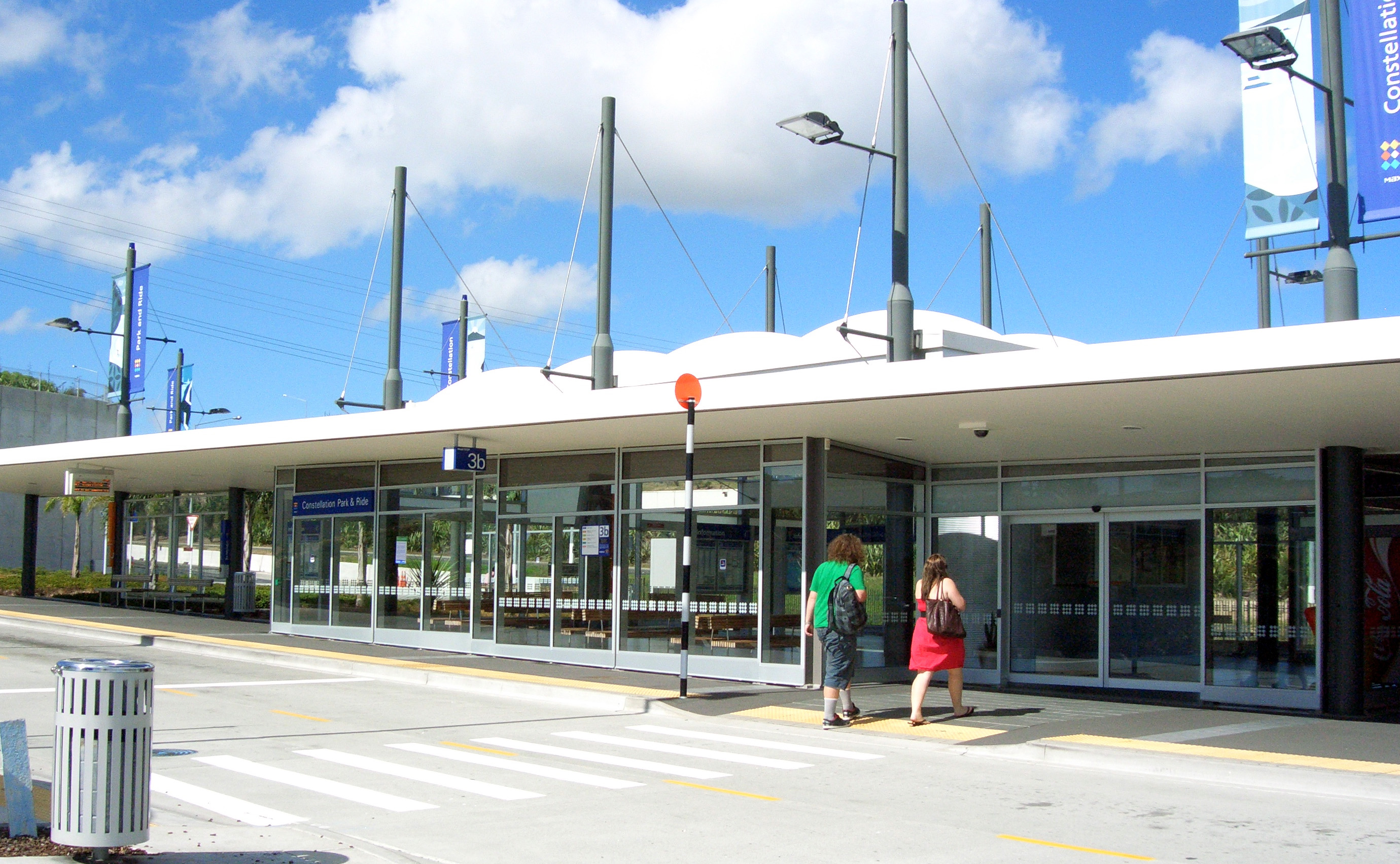
Entrance to Constellation busway station

=== Busway ===
The busway has two lanes for 6.2 km running parallel with the eastern side of the Northern Motorway from Albany Station to Akoranga Station at the Esmonde Road interchange, from where a one-way southbound bus lane extends a further 2.5 km to south of the Onewa Road interchange, where it merges with the motorway for the Harbour Bridge.

Its use is limited to Auckland Transport approved buses, emergency and maintenance vehicles. Since August 2021, SkyBus no longer operates in Auckland. The busway has been designed for possible use by car pools.

=== Bus stations ===
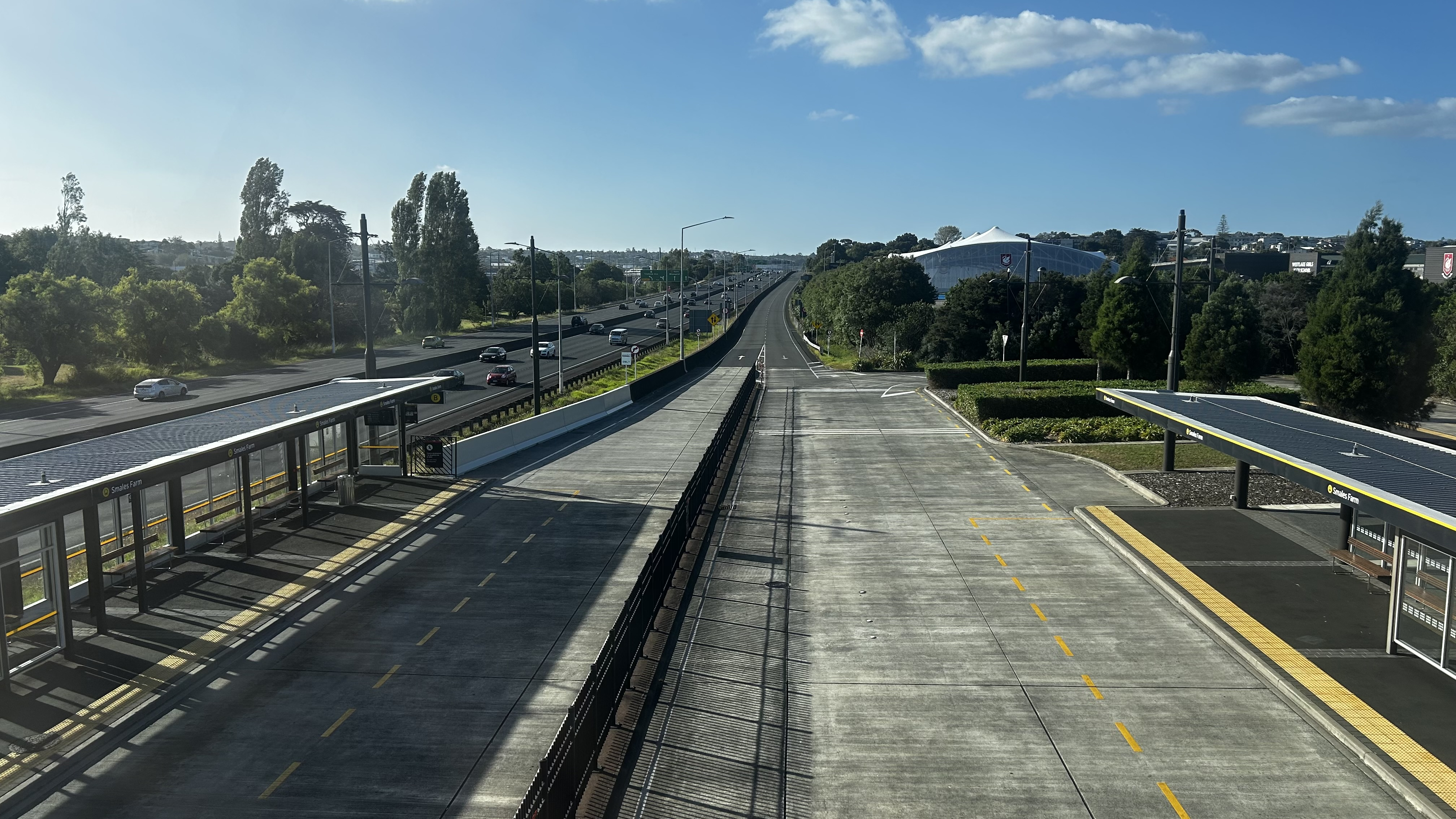
Smales Farm bus station facing north in 2024

The busway includes six dedicated stations, some with extensive park-and-ride car parks. Feeder bus services serve the stations, allowing transfer.

The stations are (north to south): All stations provide shelters and cycle parking – with glass walls, low planting, night lighting and CCTV to enhance security.

==== Hibiscus Coast ====
Located in Silverdale, this station was originally a park and ride before being converted into a station. It was officially opened as a station in February 2021. The station has services to Waiwera, Orewa, Gulf Harbour, Manly and, Warkworth.

==== Albany ====
Located in Albany. The Albany park and ride station was opened in November 2005. It serves as the terminus of some NX1 and NX2 services and all 866 services. An extension to the segregated busway from Constellation was opened in 2022.

==== Constellation ====
Located near Constellation Drive. Construction for a park and ride began in 2003 and was finished in November, 2005.

==== Sunnynook ====
Located in Sunnynook. Construction began in 2005 and finished in February 2008.

==== Smales Farm ====
Located in Takapuna, it has a customer service centre.

==== Akoranga ====
Akoranga bus station is located in Northcote.

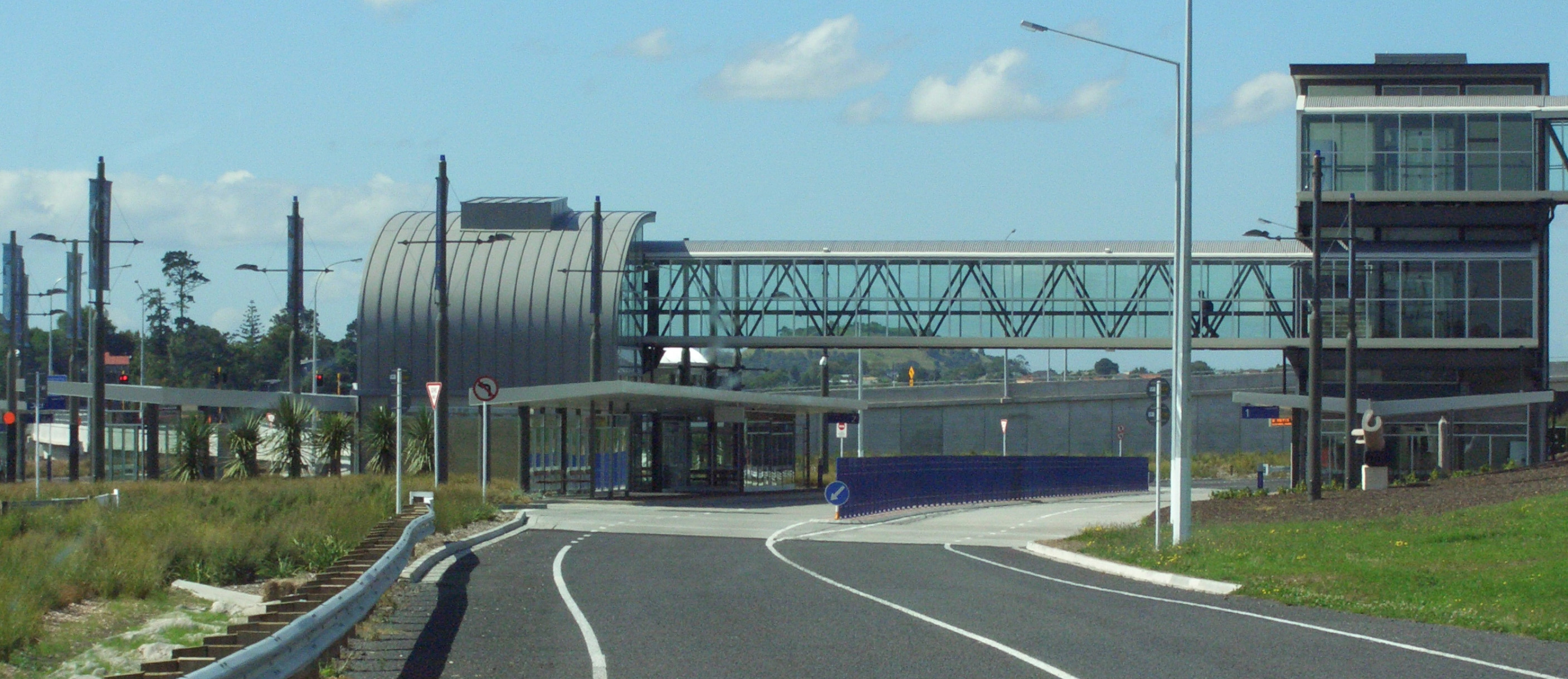
Akoranga – the footbridge leads to the western side of the motorway and AUT campus

=== Other structures ===
Major related structures are the Esmonde Interchange (including large-scale improvements for general traffic) and Tristram Avenue Viaduct, which crosses the often-congested Tristram Avenue via grade separation. The viaduct has 12 spans of 30 m each, with the foundation piles being 1.5 m thick.

The Northern Busway is adjacent to a shared path from Constellation Station to Oteha Valley Road, which opened in 2023.

=== Electricity transmission cables ===
Cable ducts were placed beneath the busway during the construction in 2005, to provide for the future installation of electricity transmission cables. The cables installed in these ducts during 2012 and 2013 form part of a major upgrade to the security of supply to North Auckland and Northland.

== Plans ==
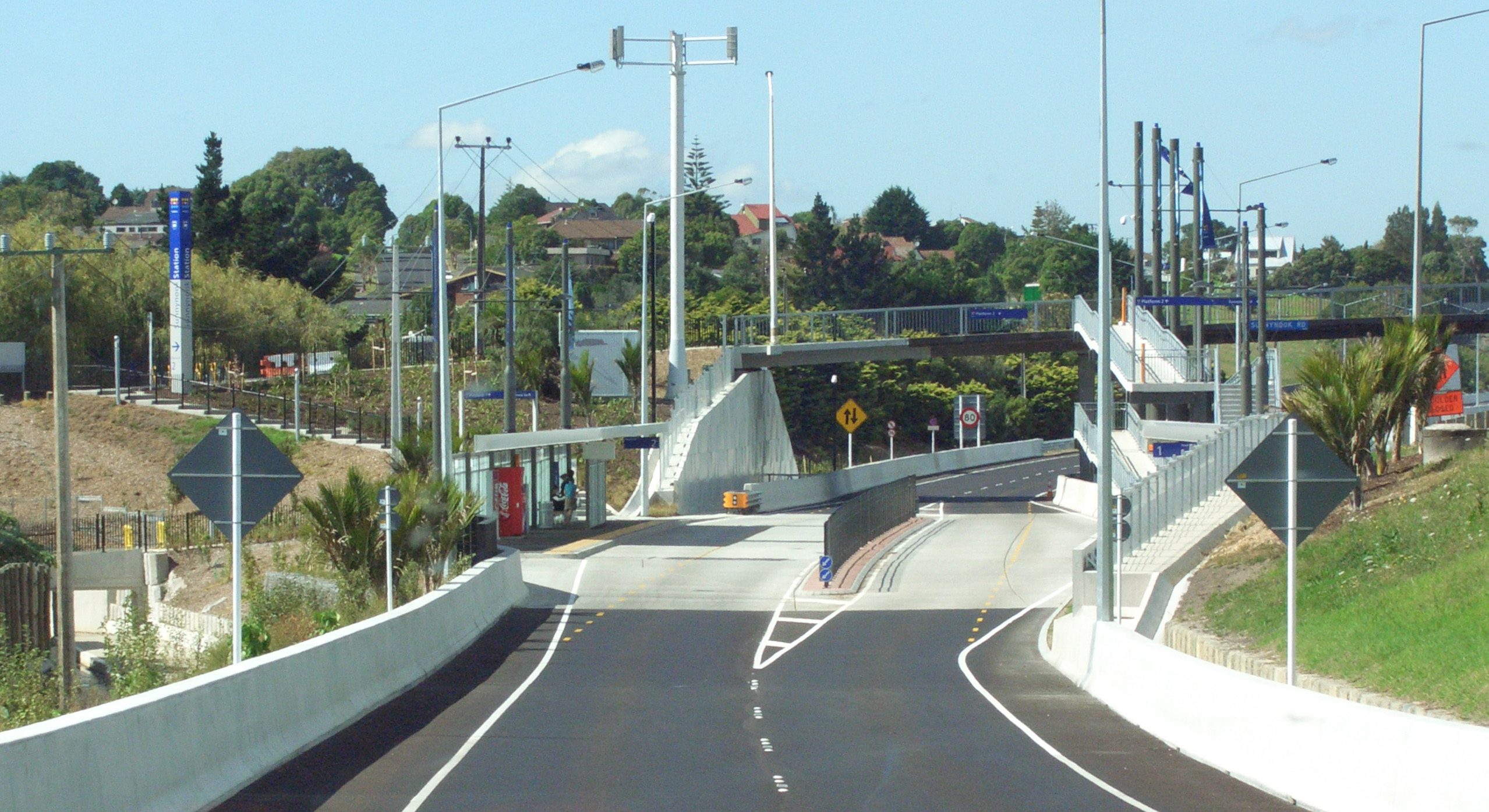
Sunnynook, the smallest of the six stations.

By 2015, plans were unveiled to extend the busway lanes northwards between Constellation Station to Albany Station. This was completed in 2022.

An extension towards Orewa in the north is being debated for the long-term future. It was originally expected to cost around NZ$500 million, although the success of the scheme has now sparked potentially more extensive schemes for between NZ$700 million and NZ$1.2 billion to at least Silverdale, with up to five tunnels and seven bridges, including a motorway flyover between Constellation and Albany stations. Plans in 2008 included additional stations at Rosedale and Redvale.

In December 2017, plans were released for a $70 million station at Rosedale, situated between the Albany and Constellation stations. The station would be sited on Arrenway Drive with platforms extending across Rosedale Road for bus transfers to other routes. A construction start date of mid-2019 and opening in 2021 were proposed. Resource consent was granted in 2020 and construction of the new station began in 2026.

=== Conversion to rail-based transit ===
The Northern Busway's usage is tracking towards capacity being reached by 2030. Auckland Transport have studied the future mass transit needs for the North Shore, with light rail being determined the most flexible mode compared to other rail-based options.

== See also ==
- Eastern Busway, Auckland
- Other busway systems
- Ritchies Transport, contracted operator of NX1, 83, and 866 services
- Tranzurban Auckland, contracted operator of NX2 services
