= MAXX (public transport brand) =

2001–2012 public transport brand in Auckland, New Zealand

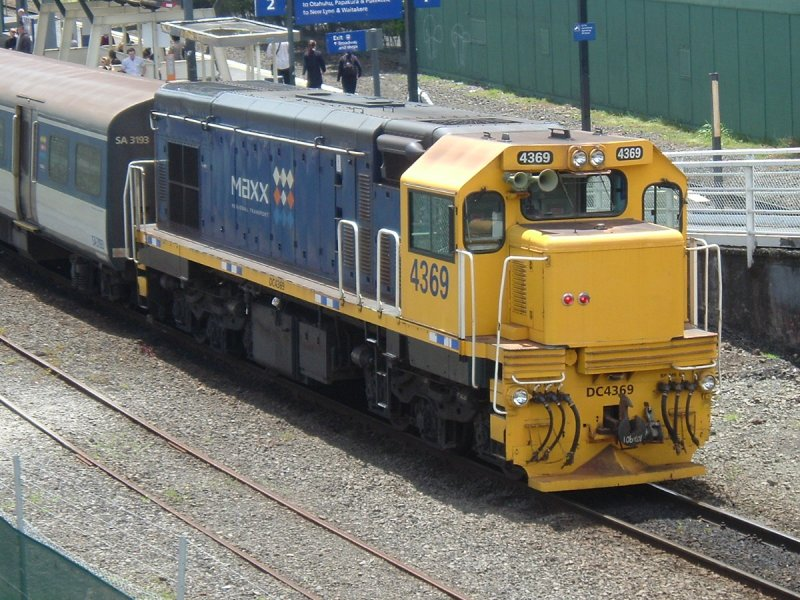
DC 4369 on an SA/SD set at Newmarket, on 13 November 2006

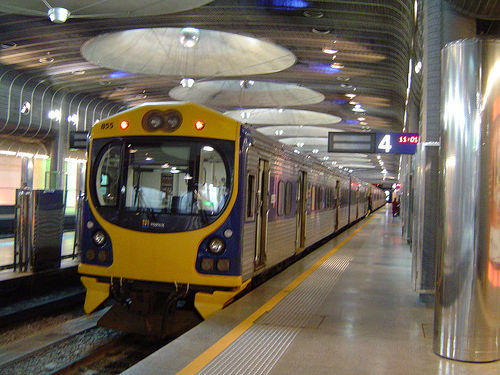
ADL class MAXX train at Britomart on 19 June 2006

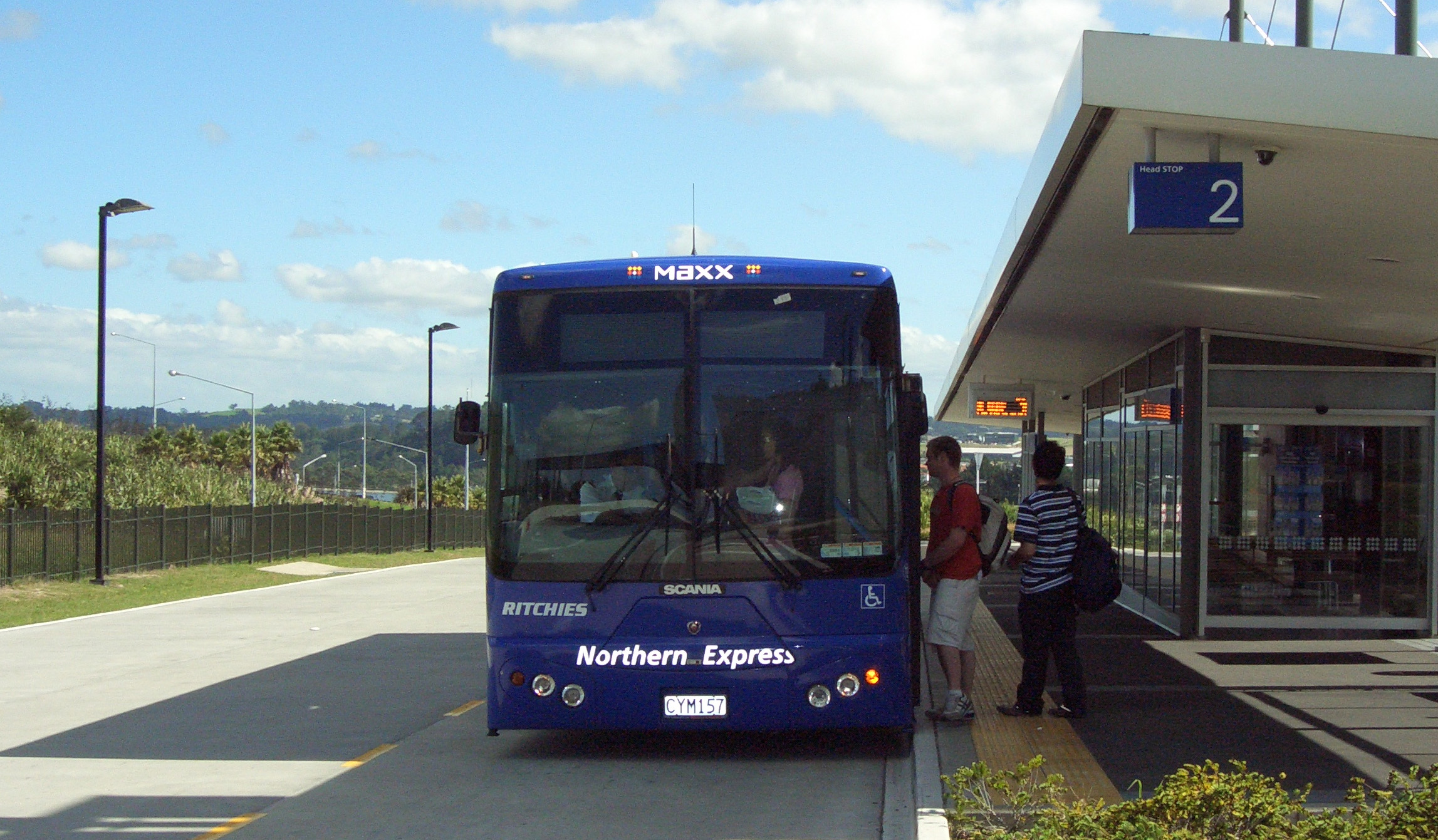
Passengers board a MAXX-branded Northern Express operated by Ritchies Transport on the Northern Busway on 10 March 2008.

MAXX (styled as MaXX) was a public transport brand in the Auckland Region of New Zealand. It was introduced in 2001. It included a blue livery used on some buses (rapid transit only) and trains operated for Auckland Transport (AT). It was also used for public information and advertising branding. AT Metro was officially launched in December 2014.

In July 2012, Auckland Transport (which replaced Auckland Regional Transport Authority in 2010) announced that it would phase out the brand, which was "weak and irrelevant" and had not achieved much public recognition, in favour of the AT Metro brand.

== Naming and criticism ==
At launch, Auckland Regional Transport Authority deemphasised the question of whether or not the name was an acronym:

"MAXX does stand for something. MAXX stands for comfortable and attractive facilities for commuters; fast, frequent and more reliable transport services; and comprehensive transport information. MAXX is not another acronym, but a symbol of quality."

The brand was originally intended to refer to Metropolitan Auckland XXpressways, a brand developed by Auckland-based Sanders Design / Stephenson & Turner. It featured a dark blue livery and a 'pesky cartoon pūkeko called Maxx'. As described by Brian Rudman, the intention to brand the whole of Auckland's public transport fleet - arrived at after years of negotiation - was undermined by the insistence of operators like Stagecoach / Infratil to use their own livery, relegating the brand to an afterthought displayed much less prominently.

== Usage ==
Apart from some usage on trains and ferries, most buses in Auckland operated in their operators' livery and brand with small MAXX stickers near the front entrance, but Northern Express buses on the Northern Busway used the MAXX brand more prominently.

== See also ==
- Public transport in Auckland
- AT Metro
- List of NZ railfan jargon
