= Motu Move =

Developing public transport payment system for New Zealand

- Location: New Zealand
- Launched: November 2025 (1 year ago)
- Predecessor: AT HOP card; Bee Card; Snapper card; Metrocard
- Operator: Cubic Transportation Systems
- Manager: NZ Transport Agency Waka Kotahi
- Currency: New Zealand Dollar
- Website: motumove.govt.nz

Motu Move is a contactless fare payment system in development as the National Ticketing Solution (NTS) for New Zealand, a project first proposed in 2007. Contracted to the American company Cubic Transportation Systems, it was first piloted on Route 29 in Christchurch with adult non-concession fares, beginning on 8 December 2024. Following the trial, initial rollout began in Greater Christchurch on 10 November 2025 with the full range of payment options and concessions. By 2027, Motu Move is expected to be available nationwide excluding the Marlborough region. The aim is to achieve a nationally consistent payment system, offering a choice of payment by contactless bank cards, mobile payment methods, pre-bought tickets or a prepaid Motu Move card valid throughout the country.

The National Ticketing Solution was previously known by various names such as Project NEXT, the National Ticketing Programme (NTP), the Auckland Integrated Ticketing Scheme (AITS) and Auckland Integrated Fares System (AIFS).

== History ==
=== Background ===
The desire to achieve a nationwide public transport payment system was first raised in 2007 when it was announced that Snapper was working on a stored-value card for public transport in the Wellington Region, with Wellington and Auckland transport officials in talks about teaming up to work on a system that could be applied nationwide.

=== Wellington: Snapper card ===
The Snapper card was introduced in Wellington in July 2008 and applied to buses operated under the GO Wellington branding (part of NZ Bus). The company that owned both Snapper (until May 2019) and NZ Bus (until September 2019) was infrastructure investment company Infratil. The Snapper card was not valid on non-NZ Bus services (e.g. Mana bus, the Wellington Cable Car, ferries, or the Metlink trains). From 2021 to late 2022 Snapper was fully rolled out on all railway lines in the Wellington Region, meaning the only form of transport missing integrated ticketing was the Harbour Ferry.

=== Auckland Integrated Ticketing Scheme ===
The NZ Transport Agency joined the discussions held between Auckland and Wellington officials in 2009. The Transport Agency's board signed off on NZTA joining in October 2009 in the context of the Auckland Regional Transport Authority (ARTA, which was succeeded by Auckland Transport in November 2010) tendering for an integrated ticketing system for public transport in the Auckland Region named Auckland Integrated Ticketing Scheme (AITS); this was later given the brand name "HOP". The underlying thinking of the Transport Agency was that it would make sense for the development cost to be paid only once, with other regional authorities able to join and use the same technology. The Transport Agency opted to lead the project, provided co-funding, wanted to be in control of the central clearing house system, and stated that it was most interested in getting information out of the system. The Transport Agency's aim was to develop the National Integrated Ticketing Interoperability Standard (NITIS).

ARTA awarded the tender for the Auckland stored-value card to the Thales Group as the French technology on offer was technically superior to what Snapper had offered. The Thales Group offered a technical solution based on the DESFire system, which at the time was the international industry standard for public transport payment systems. Snapper's system used the Java Card OpenPlatform, which is common for payment systems but with slower transaction times, which is an issue for mass payments. Snapper lodged a complaint, later dismissed, questioning the legitimacy of the tender process.

In spite of this, Snapper announced in late-2009 that it would begin rolling out its "comprehensive integrated ticketing" system onto all NZ Bus services (but no other Auckland bus company or service). The announcement was made without communication with the Transport Agency or ARTA, the latter of which called the Snapper announcement "premature" citing the development of the Thales system and confirming that all public transport operators in Auckland, including NZ Bus, would be required to participate.

Replacing ARTA in 2010, Auckland Transport announced it had invited Snapper to work with the council-controlled organisation and Thales on the ticketing system. Infratil went ahead and fitted out its NZ Bus fleet in Auckland with hardware that could read their Snapper card, on the condition that Snapper would adjust its system so that it could interact with the Thales components, this was sanctioned by NZTA staff. Snapper, based on its system already in use in Wellington, could roll out the system more quickly and the aim was to be operational on the entire NZ Bus fleet for the Rugby World Cup to be held in New Zealand from 9 September 2011.

In April 2011, Auckland Transport launched the "HOP card", developed by Snapper, with initial rollout on all NZ Bus services.

In August 2012, Auckland Transport terminated its agreement with Snapper over an ongoing inability to configure their system to work smoothly with the Thales Group system. Snapper said it would sue Auckland Transport as a result.

Labour opposition spokesperson for Housing and Auckland Issues, Phil Twyford, alleged in parliament in November 2012 that there had been political interference, with the Minister of Transport, Steven Joyce, having instructed Transport Agency officials for Snapper to be included in the Auckland project. The Office of the Auditor-General later opened an investigation into the matter.

Auckland Transport then rolled out the AT HOP card from October 2012 (starting with trains and ferries) until April 2014 (finishing with buses).

In November 2024, Auckland Transport added the ability to pay for public transport using contactless payment methods. When using contactless payments, a full adult fare is charged, and there is no ability to view detailed transaction history. Auckland Transport says this is the first step towards integrating with the National Ticketing System.

=== Wellington: Integrated ticketing ===
The Wellington Regional Council announced in May 2013 that they were investigating an integrated ticketing system for the Wellington region. At the time, they thought that they would be tendering the new system in circa 2016. Transport Agency staff approached the Wellington Regional Council in December 2015, suggesting that they introduce the Hop card system, therefore working towards having a unified system for the country. Part of the Transport Agency's proposal was that its subsidiary, New Zealand Transport Ticketing Limited (NZTTL, established in November 2011), be appointed to act as the central clearing house. Under the leadership of Paul Swain, the chair of Wellington Region's transport committee, the Transport Agency's approach was rejected. One generic argument against a single system is that it would create a monopoly, whereas with more than one system there is "healthy" competition. Another argument for rejection was that by then, the technology had moved on, from closed-loop (Note: closed-loop refers to a payment card from a single issuer, e.g. the Snapper card or the AT HOP card; these cards store a value on them) card-based (Note: card-based refers to both a value as well as the entitlement to travel being stored on a card in possession of the passenger) systems to account-based (Note: account-based refers to a fare-collection system where the proof of entitlement to travel is held in a back-office and is not necessarily held on any media in possession of the passenger) systems. The latter includes the possibility that payments get made via smartphones, debit cards and credit cards, removing the need for users to have a proprietary payment card linked to a public transport provider. At the same time, it was announced that the tender for the Wellington integrated system would now happen by 2018.

=== Regional Consortium: Bee Card ===
Nine of the smaller regional councils formed the Regional Consortium in 2013, a collaborative working group that could represent their shared interests in public transport matters. These regions are (from north to south):

- Northland
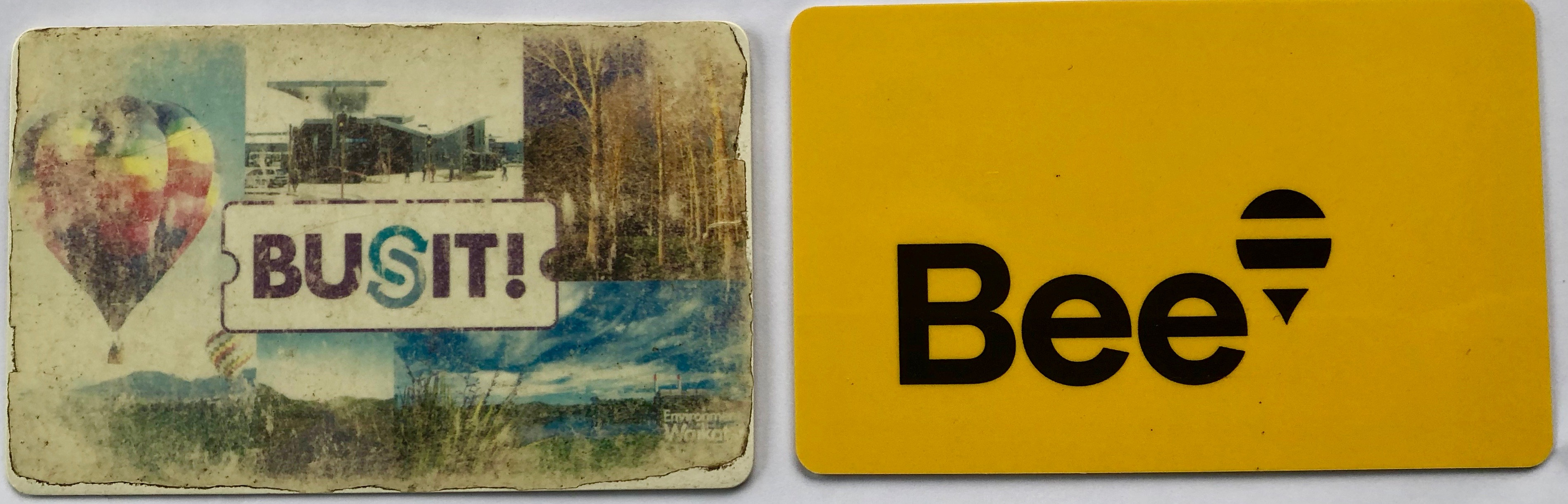
- Bee Cards replaced BUSIT cards in Waikato on 1 July 2020
  Waikato
- Bay of Plenty
- Hawke's Bay
- Taranaki
- Manawatū-Whanganui
- Nelson
- Otago
- Southland

By late 2013, service level agreements had been put in place for the coming three years in support of the existing ticketing systems; it was thought that this was a sufficient time frame for the National Integrated Ticketing Interoperability Standard (NITIS) to be ready. The smaller regions could subsequently procure systems that integrate with the national ticketing system. The governance group of the Regional Consortium was made up of representatives from the Transport Agency, its subsidiary NZTTL, and executives of seven of the nine regional councils. When NITIS, the critical component for integration into the national ticketing system, was not available on time, the regional councils extended their service level agreements to May 2018. In early 2016, it was agreed between the Regional Consortium, the Transport Agency, and Wellington region that the integration into the national ticketing system would no longer be pursued.

In 2017, the Regional Consortium let a contract to INIT, a German-headquartered company that provides IT solutions for public transport. Their brief is to supply a solution that has been named the Regional Integrated Ticketing System (RITS). One "tag on, tag off" stored-value (i.e. closed-loop) card for all nine regions is to be implemented. It is planned for RITS to be an interim solution for up to five years prior to joining the national ticketing system. RITS is much simpler than the open-loop (Note: open-loop refers to a payment source (e.g. a card, mobile wallet, QR code) that is widely accepted by multiple merchants; examples are common credit cards) account-based solution pursued for the national ticketing system.

=== National Ticketing Programme: GRETS ===
Based on Greater Wellington's feedback, a working party was convened from 2016 under the project name of National Ticketing Programme, also known under the acronym GRETS (Greater Wellington, Regional Consortium, Environment Canterbury Ticketing Solution). Parties represented on the steering group were the Transport Agency, its subsidiary NZTTL, (Note: The Transport Agency shut down NZTTL during 2017) Bay of Plenty region, Canterbury region, Wellington region, Otago region, Taranaki region, and Waikato region. The smaller regional councils were there to represent the Regional Consortium. Wellington Region led the project. Based on Auckland's contract with Thales running until 2021 (with an option to extent to 2026), it was assumed that they would not join the programme and were not included in the economic analysis. The Regional Interim Ticketing Solution (RITS) was endorsed by this group. The system requirement was now account-based ticketing and open-loop payment solutions that would accommodate EMV-based credit and debit cards (e.g. Visa and mastercard) as well as tokens and digital wallets (e.g. Apple Pay). In October 2017, indicative business cases for two options had been developed (a do-minimum and a GRETS rollout). Procurement was planned to start in late 2017.

=== Project NEXT ===
The situation changed when Auckland Transport joined GRETS in early 2018 and in May 2018, this resulted in Project NEXT being formed as a successor to GRETS. The project continued to be led by Wellington Region. The Transport Agency disestablished the governance group and handed its oversight to a newly formed group called the Connected Journey Solutions (CJS) unit. When the Transport Agency's CEO, Fergus Gammie, resigned and was replaced by interim-CEO Mark Ratcliffe, concerns were raised internally and Ratcliffe commissioned professional services company Deloitte with undertaking a review of Project NEXT. CJS had already been subject to an earlier and damning audit by Deloitte and the Project NEXT review was equally critical. Key criticisms included:

- Transport Agency's focus on the National Ticketing Programme (NTP) appears to have lapsed
- Lack of clear ticketing and public transport objectives
- Governance mechanisms are not fit for purpose
- Lack of business ownership
- The Project does not have the Crown-level review and assurance disciplines as expected by Deloitte

As of late 2019, it was expected that the rollout for Project NEXT would begin with the Wellington commuter rail in 2022, some two years later than previously planned. Also in 2022, the system would be implemented on the Wellington bus fleet, followed in 2023 by implementation on the services provided in the Canterbury region. The nine PTAs that form the Regional Consortium were expected to have joined by 2024. Auckland Transport is expected to adopt the system in 2026 when their current HOP card contract expires.

As of 2020, Gisborne and Marlborough districts do not plan to join Project NEXT.

In July 2021, it was announced that the rollout changed, with the Canterbury region to get the card first in late 2022, followed by the Wellington region in late 2022 or early 2023. The programme director stated that timelines may still change, though.

=== National Ticketing Solution ===
In October 2022, the system was renamed National Ticketing Solution and a contract with American transport solutions company Cubic Transportation Systems for the development of the new fare payment system was signed. The rollout was again adjusted, with Canterbury still set to be the first to receive the access to the payment system, in 2024. As of 2022, Gisborne has decided to join the group while Marlborough is still opting out. It is budgeted to cost $1.3 billion over 15 years; for comparison, the Government Policy Statement on Land Transport 2021 set a funding range of $410 to $630 million for 2022–23 for public transport.

On 21 October, Minister of Transport Michael Wood announced that the Government would invest NZ$1.3 billion with merging all bus, train and ferry fare payment systems into the National Ticketing Solution. By this stage, Waka Kotahi (the New Zealand Transport Agency) and several urban and regional councils had signed contracts with Cubic. The national payment system would be gradually rolled out across the country and would replace all existing municipal and regional payment systems including the Bee Card.

=== Motu Move rollout ===
Physical prepaid Motu Move card

In June 2024, the name for the solution was announced as Motu Move, with a launch set for Timaru in December 2024 for MyWay by Metro services, with other public transport in Canterbury such as Christchurch following in 2025. In October 2024, the rollout was adjusted to include a pilot of the technology on the Route 29 bus between Christchurch Airport and the city in Christchurch to ensure a smooth transition. The Route 29 pilot will enable payments for standard adult fares with contactless bank cards and mobile devices, including smartwatches, on the new contactless payment technology with cash and Metrocards still being accepted, ensuring continued access to concessions. Following this, the first rollout in Timaru and Temuka was delayed until early 2025, with features including concessions and the ability to pay with contactless payment options, including the new prepaid Motu Move card, and pre-bought tickets. In March 2025, the rollout of Motu Move was once again revised to begin in mid 2025.

In June 2025, the rollout was delayed again with no estimated schedule for when the system would begin operation. In September 2025, the programme was reset with rollout to begin in Greater Christchurch in mid-November 2025. Final rollout of Motu Move was also readjusted to be delivered by the end of 2027.

==== Rollout schedule ====
Rollout of Motu Move is expected to progress region-by-region beginning with the Canterbury region in late 2025.

Place	Expected rollout	Notes
Canterbury	November 2025	Pilot on Route 29 on 8 December 2024 Tag-on-only rollout in Greater Christchurch including the Waimakariri and Selwyn Districts on 10 November 2025.
Invercargill	Q4 2026	
Bay of Plenty	Q1 2027	
Taranaki	Q1 2027	
Wellington Region	Q2 2027	In February 2025, the Greater Wellington Regional Council announced that Motu Move would launch in early 2026, with a total weekly and daily fare cap system. After the launch of Motu Move in the region was delayed to late 2027, the Regional Council announced in December 2025 that it would launch its own contactless payment system that is expected to replace the existing Snapper cards by 30 March 2026.
Hawke's Bay	Q3 2027	
Manawatū/Horowhenua	Q3 2027	
Nelson	Q3 2027	
Otago	Q3 2027	On 30 January 2025, the Otago Regional Council's planning and transport general manager Anita Dawe confirmed plans to roll out the Motu Move in early 2026. These cards would replace the existing Bee Card throughout the region.
Whanganui/Rangitikei	Q3 2027	
Auckland	Q4 2027	Implemented contactless payments with standard adult fares, in addition to AT HOP cards, on 17 November 2024
Northland	Q4 2027	
Gisborne	Q4 2027	
Waikato	Q4 2027	
