= Snapper card =

Electronic ticket card used in New Zealand

Snapper Card
- Location: Wellington
- Launched: June 2008
- Technology: Infineon, SmartMX from NXP Semiconductors
- Manager: ICM Limited
- Currency: NZD ($300 maximum load)
- Stored-value: Pay as you go
- Auto recharge: Auto-topup
- Validity: Metlink Buses Metlink Ferries (former) Metlink Trains Wellington Cable Car (former)
- Retailed: Retailers
- Website: www.snapper.co.nz

The Snapper card is a contactless electronic ticketing card used to pay for bus and train fares in the Wellington Region of New Zealand.

== History ==
The system, with a nautical themed name, was introduced in Wellington in July 2008. Another version – the Snapper HOP card – was introduced to Auckland in 2011 and withdrawn from Auckland in late 2013. Snapper CityLink cards were introduced in Whangārei in March 2014 and withdrawn in September 2018.

It was owned by Snapper Services Limited, a former subsidiary of Infratil until 2019 when it was sold to ICM Limited, a subsidiary of Allectus Capital.

In early December 2025, the Greater Wellington Regional Council announced plans to introduce its own contactless payment system, citing delays with the rollout national ticket solution Motu Move. Motu Move has delayed its launch in the Wellington region from late 2026 to late 2027. Contactless payments began being accepted in April 2026.

== Services ==
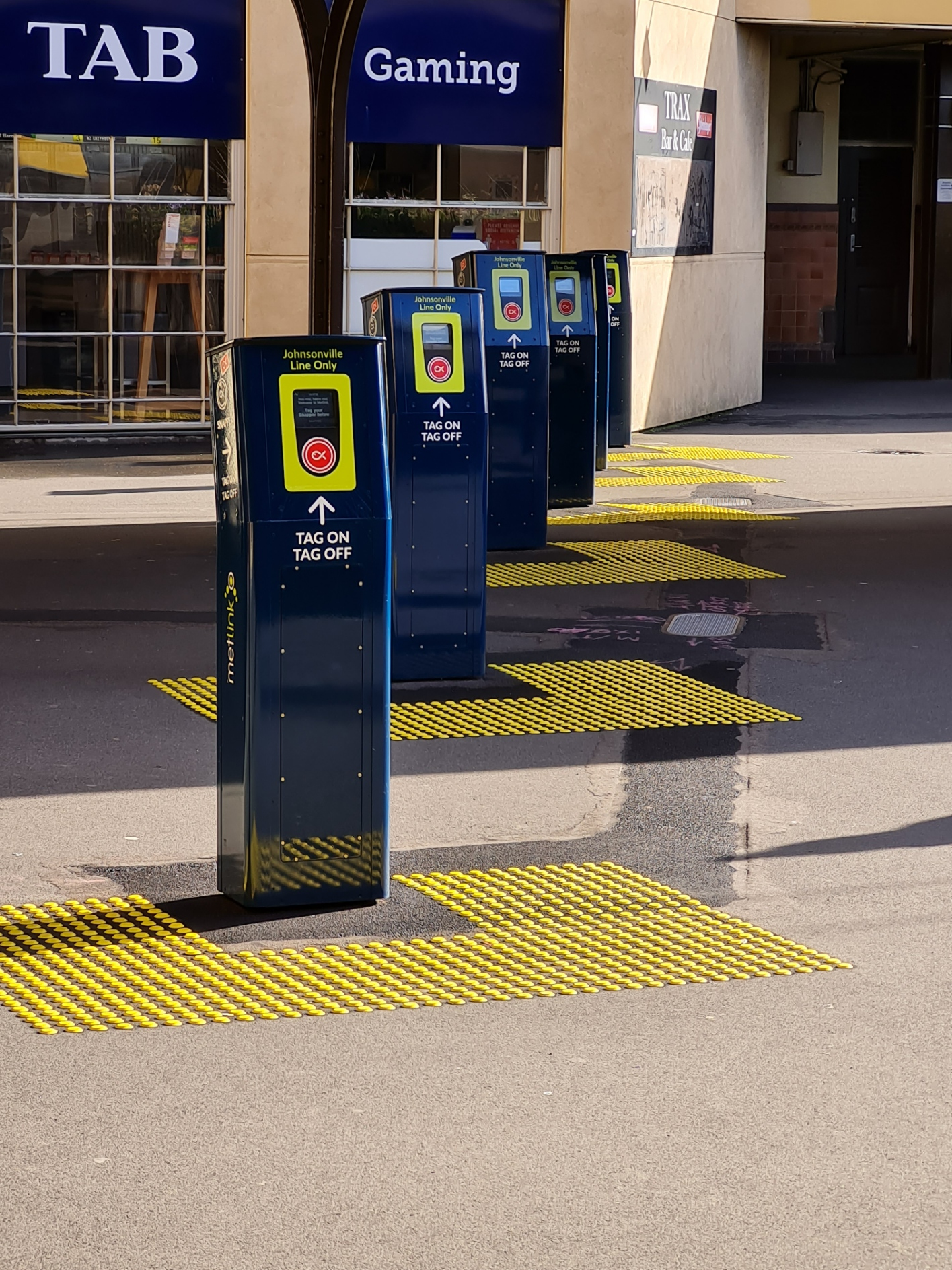
Snapper card scanners at Wellington railway station, July 2022

=== Buses ===
GO Wellington buses were the first to use Snapper cards, with "tag on/off" card readers inside the bus entrance and exit doors. It was trialled by 200 users on route 17 to Karori. From 1 June 2009 there is a 20% discount on standard fares for adults using a Snapper. Previously, this discount was 25%. Snapper was made available on Valley Flyer buses from 14 June 2009, and on Runcimans school buses in September later that year. As of 2018 Snapper is available on Mana/Newlands Coach Services buses as the Metlink bus network had been unified under one style and one fare system.

On 1 December 2009, Snapper announced plans to enter the Auckland market, targeting coverage of 80% of public transport by Rugby World Cup 2011. Infratil, ANZ Bank New Zealand (then ANZ National Bank), Eyede, Unisys and Beca Group pitched Snapper to the Auckland Regional Transport Authority (ARTA), which had made public its intention to introduce smartcards on public transport in Auckland. Snapper released the so-called purple HOP card, which was used only on NZ Bus services (but no other Auckland bus company or service) in Auckland from March 2011 until late 2013. After Auckland Transport superseded ARTA in 2010, Thales Group was awarded the contract and Snapper was required to exit the Auckland market after failing to make their system compatible with Thales' system. Subsequently, the rollout of the AT HOP card for all Auckland bus, train and ferry services was completed by Auckland Transport by March 2014.

On 3 March 2014, the Northland Regional Council introduced Snapper cards for Whangarei's urban bus network, CityLink Whangarei. On 29 September 2019, Snapper cards were phased out for the Whangarei bus network, which was replaced with the Bee Card.

=== Trains ===
The Johnsonville Branch was the first line to adopt the Snapper card system for fare payments on 14 November 2021, with the hardware, reader stands, and other necessary equipment being installed previously in August. "Snapper on rail" (as coined by Metlink) operated similarly to the already in-use bus system, with commuters required to "tag" on and off at card readers located on the station platform. The reason for the system only being installed on the Johnsonville Branch at first, was to act as a “trial run” to gauge if the system was viable to replace paper tickets on other Wellington suburban lines.

The Snapper system was eventually rolled out to the Kāpiti Line, Hutt Valley Line, and Melling Branch on 12 November 2022. The Wairarapa Connection adopted Snapper at later date, on the 27 November 2022; marking full integration with the rest of the Snapper system.

The Capital Connection (running between Wellington and Palmerston North) does not accept the Snapper card as it is not a Metlink service, and instead has its own ticketing and fare structure.

=== Ferries ===
Tickets for the East by West Ferry in Wellington could be purchased with Snapper cards at Queen's Wharf. Since early 2010, the Snapper card could be used to tag-on and tag-off the ferry, much like on buses, but there was no discount for using it on the ferry. Tag on-tag off services on the ferry have been discontinued. The old style card readers are there but they are covered up and disabled.

=== Retail stores ===
Many retailers in Wellington allowed Snapper as a form of payment, and facilitate topping up a Snapper card. These included FIX convenience stores, dairies and ticket offices throughout the Greater Wellington region.

In 2015, Snapper announced that, from 1 June, these contactless payments would no longer be available in stores and retail outlets (but may still be accepted in some schools).

=== Taxis ===
Starting in September 2010, Snapper could be used as payment for around 700 of Wellington's 1250 taxis. This was removed on 1 September 2020 due to it being available less often in taxis and used less by passengers.

== Use ==
The bus-ticketing system is based on a "tag-on", "tag-off" principle, providing valuable data for transport authorities to analyse and plan for travel behaviour.

There are 2 different types of cards; a red card for adults, and a green card for school-aged children, which comes pre-loaded with a child concession.

== Technology ==
Snapper is a contactless smart card based on Infineon and SmartMX (from NXP Semiconductors) chip sets. It uses the Triple DES cryptographic system, which is standard in financial cards and has been approved in New Zealand as a secure mechanism for connection through to the EFTPOS network. The Snapper system is an adaptation of the T-money system used in South Korea.

On 3 May 2012, Snapper and 2degrees mobile announced the launch of a service that allows customers with a compatible NFC phone to make payments in all Snapper merchants using their mobile phone. The first phone to support this service is the LG Optimus Net. This service requires compatible NFC phone and a special SIM card with the snapper secure element included.

== Use of personal information ==
In 2012, Snapper ran an email marketing campaign using email addresses from 52,258 bus passengers who used the card. The email addresses, and other personal data such as date of birth and financial transactions, were originally collected by Auckland Transport and provided to Snapper. Auckland Transport said Snapper's marketing was not an appropriate use of personal data, but others questioned why Auckland Transport shared this passenger information with Snapper in the first place. Following the incident, Auckland Transport reviewed its privacy policy.
