= AT HOP card =

Public transport fare card

- AT HOP card
- Location: Auckland
- Launched: October 2012; 14 years ago
- Technology: Contactless smart card by Thales Group MiFare DESFire EV1
- Manager: Auckland Transport
- Currency: NZD ($500 maximum load)
- Stored-value: Pay as you go
- Credit expiry: 10 years, but balance is transferable
- Auto recharge: Auto Top Up (available for registered cards)
- Validity: AT Buses; AT Trains; AT Ferries; Fullers360 Waiheke ferry; Island Direct Waiheke ferry
- Retailed: Online; Ticket offices; Authorised retailers; Vending machines
- Website: at.govt.nz/athop

The AT HOP card is an electronic fare payment card that was released in two versions on Auckland public transport services, beginning in May 2011. The smart card roll out was the first phase in the introduction of an integrated ticketing and fares system (Auckland Integrated Fares System, or "AIFS") that was rolled out across the region.

The first iteration of the card – commonly referred to as the "purple HOP card" – was discontinued in 2012 because of issues with the delivery of key technologies. The current card, called the AT HOP card, is in use on all ferry, train and bus services in Auckland. The rollout of the card to all three transport modes was completed in March 2014.

== Card operation ==
The AT HOP card is a light to medium blue credit-card-sized stored-value contactless smartcard that can hold prepaid funds (called HOP Money) to pay for fares or for monthly passes for unlimited travel within one or more of three "transport zones". Either facility must be added to the card before travel. Passengers "tag on" and "tag off" their card on electronic terminals when entering and leaving the transport system in order to validate it or deduct funds.

Cards may be "topped-up" or monthly passes purchased in the following ways: online, at ticket machines, at ticketing offices, and at selected retail outlets such as bookshops. Top ups may be made by credit or debit card, with the latter three mediums accepting cash payment. The card is designed to reduce the number of transactions at ticket offices and the number of paper tickets. Usage is encouraged by offering cheaper fares than the cash ticket option, although there is an initial once-only fee to purchase the card. Monthly and/or multiple trip travel is only available with the AT HOP card.

The card can be used only for fare payments and only on Auckland Transport (AT) routes; it cannot be used to pay for refreshments or other items. It cannot be used to pay for travel on the Northern Explorer passenger train running between Auckland and Wellington or on inter-city bus services. The Te Huia train service (running between Auckland and Hamilton) does not accept the AT HOP card, rather using the Bee Card.

The AT HOP cards are based on near field communication (NFC) with DESFire with support of 3DES and AES, enabling 168–128 bit keys. This encryption give card holders the ability to not have their card simply cloned.

AT HOP cards expire 10 years from the date they are issued. Customers can get a replacement card free of charge as well as have the credit transferred from the old card to the new card.

== History ==
In 2008, the Auckland Regional Transport Authority announced its intentions to develop an integrated ticketing system for the region's public transport services, called the Auckland Integrated Fares System (AIFS).

An initial system developed with a consortium including the French Thales Group and New Zealand-based Snapper Services was announced in 2010, however subsequent difficulties with the development of technologies for the system saw the termination of Auckland Transport's agreement with Snapper. The council-controlled organisation confirmed Thales would be contracted with ongoing development of the system across the entirety of the region's transport network.

=== HOP/Snapper card debacle ===
Snapper Services Ltd, a subsidiary of Infratil, made a joint bid with ANZ, New Zealand Post, Eyede, Unisys and Beca Group for the contract of developing Auckland's integrated ticketing system. However, the contract was awarded to the Thales Group. Snapper lodged a complaint, later dismissed, questioning the legitimacy of the tender process.

The first iteration of the HOP card supplied by Snapper could be used on NZ Bus services only.

Snapper announced in late-2009 that it would begin rolling out its Snapper card onto NZ Bus services (but no other Auckland bus company or service), in spite of the Auckland Regional Transport Authority-Thales integrated ticketing arrangement. In response, the Auckland Regional Transport Authority called the Snapper announcement "premature" citing the development of ARTA's integrated ticketing offering still in development with Thales and confirming that all public transport operators in Auckland, including NZ Bus, would be required to participate in ARTA's system. Replacing the Auckland Regional Transport Authority in 2010, Auckland Transport (AT) announced it had invited Snapper to work with the council-controlled organisation and Thales on the ticketing system. AT confirmed Snapper would develop a contactless smart card and supply buses with ticketing terminals that would support the Thales developed back-end, to be rolled out initially on NZ Bus services and later on ferry and train services in time for the Rugby World Cup 2011.

In April 2011, AT announced the "HOP card", developed by Snapper, with initial rollout on all NZ Bus services. This iteration of the "HOP card" was met with initial confusion as to its capabilities and the extent of Auckland Transport's integration with Snapper and Snapper's pre-existing infrastructure, which included the ability to make minor transactions with merchants and retailers. Concerns were also raised as to the ability of Auckland's ticketing system to work with Snapper cards used on Wellington's transport network and vice versa, with AT later instructing NZ Bus drivers not to accept the Wellington implementation of the Snapper card.

AT subsequently announced in early-2012 that bus passengers would be required to "swap out" their HOP/Snapper cards for a new integrated ticketing card, also called "HOP", as the Snapper offering would not be supported on ferries, trains and on some bus services.

Snapper faced difficulties in developing its technology to work with the Thales system, with Thales' New Zealand chief executive citing that the "failure of Snapper to deliver a functional bus system that meets the ratified standard has caused delays to project go-live". Snapper's "failure" to meet the November 30 deadline imposed by AT ultimately led to the organisation severing its relationship with Snapper, citing "concerns about whether Snapper could modify its system in a suitable timeframe". Snapper maintained it was "wrongly blamed" for the delays, declaring “Auckland Transport is being disingenuous with its attempt to position Snapper as the reason that the [integrated ticketing] project is delayed."

AT confirmed it had commissioned Thales to provide the new iteration of the "HOP" smart card – called "AT HOP" – and its ticketing terminals, replacing the HOP/Snapper offering on NZ Bus services and introducing the new card onto ferries, trains and all other bus services.

=== Launch ===
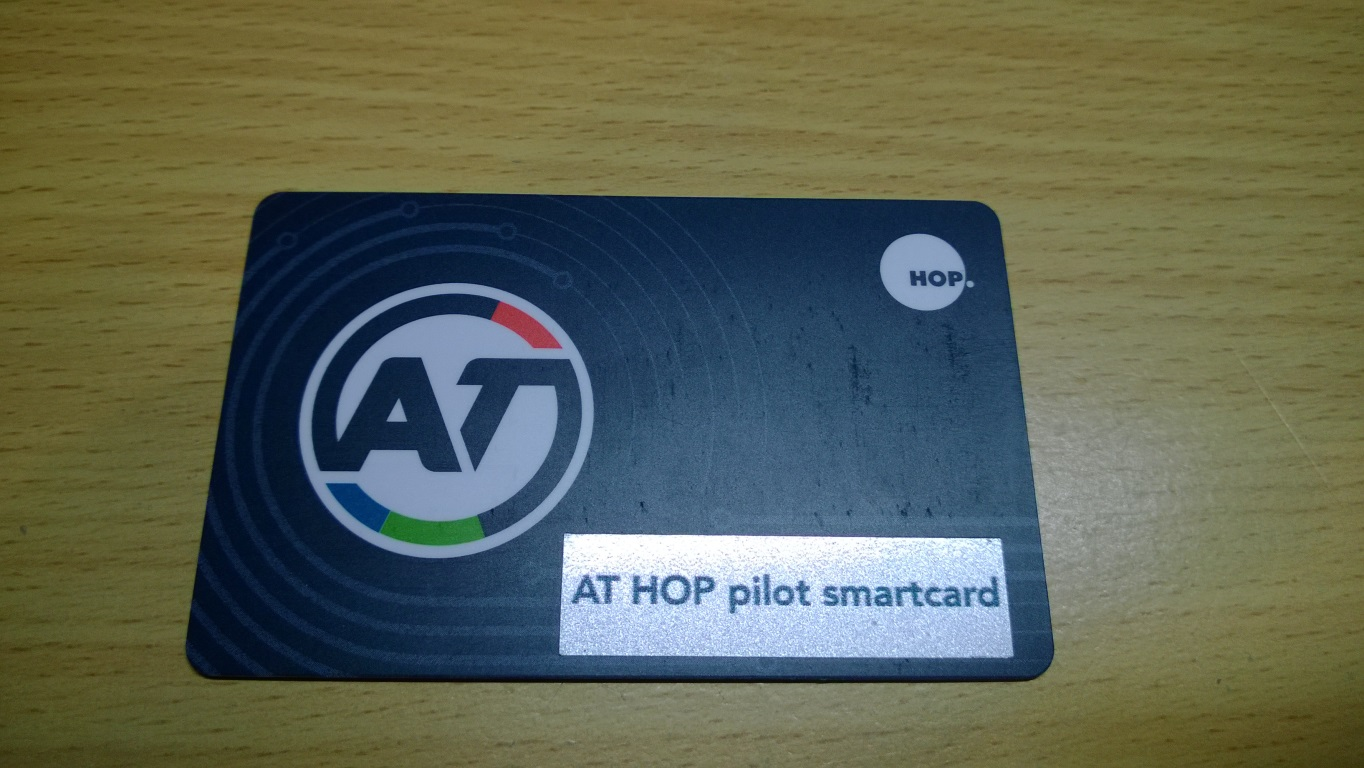
AT HOP pilot card

The first dark blue 'AT HOP card' began rolling out on public transport, starting with the rail network on 28 October 2012. The rollout for all Auckland bus, train and ferry services was completed by March 2014.

Spark (then Telecom) had trialed a 'virtual AT HOP card' on Android phones with NFC and intended it for release in late 2013.

=== Post-launch operation ===
A fee of 25 cents for each top up was abolished in July 2014.

In September 2016, it was reported that the one millionth AT HOP card had been sold, and that 42 per cent of Auckland adults had a card as of June 2016.

The contract with the Thales Group runs until 2021. AT has the option to extend the contract to 2026. The expectation is that in 2026, Auckland will implement Project NEXT (later renamed to National Ticketing Solution; branded as Motu Move), an open-loop account-based public transport payment system proposed for New Zealand. With Auckland joining Project NEXT, implementation of this system across the country should be completed, meaning that from then on, the whole country will use the same system.

In 2024, AT introduced 'Fareshare' which is loaded onto AT HOP cards to enable employers to subsidise public transport costs.

In November 2024, AT launched contactless payments, allowing bus, train and ferry passengers to 'tag on and off' with debit/credit cards, Apple Pay, Google Pay and Samsung Pay in addition to AT HOP cards. Concession fares are only supported with AT HOP cards. In March 2025, 11% of passengers were using contactless payments on weekdays. About 4000 payment validators were replaced for the launch which are expected to work with the Motu Move card.

=== Motu Move ===
AT joined the National Ticketing Programme: GRETS in early 2018 and in May 2018, this resulted in Project NEXT being formed as a successor to GRETS. In October 2022, the system was renamed National Ticketing Solution. Minister of Transport Michael Wood announced that the Government would invest NZ$1.3 billion into merging all bus, train and ferry fare payment systems into the National Ticketing Solution. The national payment system would be gradually rolled out across the country and would replace all existing municipal and regional payment systems. In June 2024, the name for the solution was announced as Motu Move. The aim is to achieve a nationally consistent payment system, offering a choice of payment by contactless bank cards, mobile payment methods, pre-bought tickets or a prepaid Motu Move card valid throughout the country.
