= Rob Campbell (economist) =

New Zealand economist and trade unionist (born 1951)

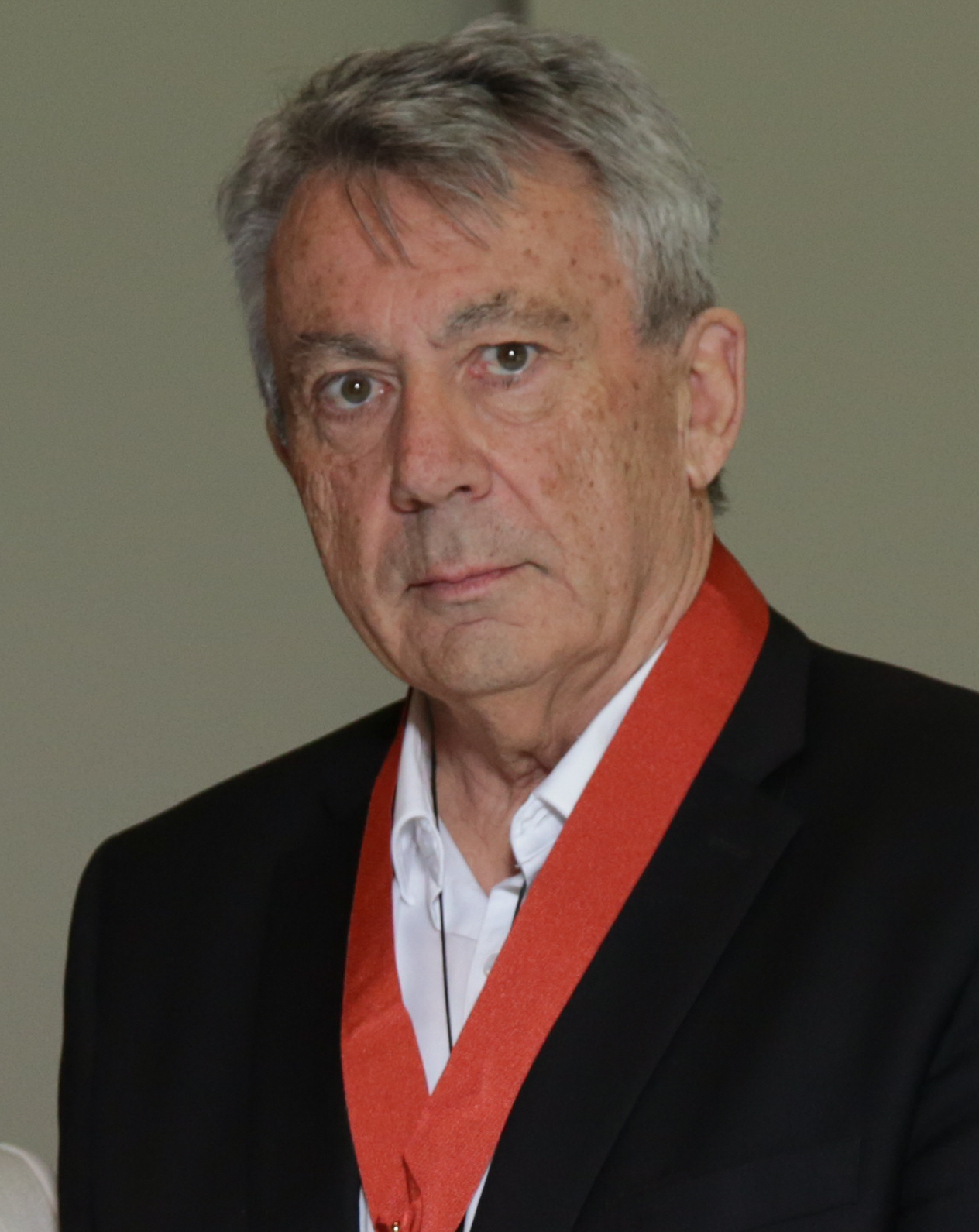
Rob Campbell receiving his Companion of the New Zealand Order of Merit award at the 2020 New Year Honours.

Robert James Campbell, CNZM (born 1951) is a New Zealand economist, trade unionist, businessman, and public servant. He has chaired several organisations and institutions including Resistance Bookshop, the Distribution Worker's Federation, Federation of Labour, Guinness Peat Group (GPG), SkyCity, Summerset Holdings, Tourism Holdings, Te Whatu Ora (Health New Zealand), and the Environmental Protection Authority (EPA). He has also served as Chancellor of Auckland University of Technology since 2019.

Between late February and early March 2023, Campbell was dismissed from his positions as chair of Te Whatu Ora and the Environmental Protection Authority over a social media post criticising the National Party's opposition to the government's Three Waters reform programme; which breached the Public Service Commission's neutrality policy.

== Early life and education ==
Campbell was born in Featherston in 1951 to a middle class European New Zealander family. Campbell and his family later moved to Hutt Valley, where his father worked as a banker. Campbell attended Hutt Valley High School where he played rugby.

Campbell later studied economics and political science at Victoria University of Wellington where he became involved in left-wing politics and causes including the anti-Vietnam War and anti-Apartheid movements. Campbell credited Victoria University professors John Gould and Gary Hawke with influencing his career. He also became the director of an anarchist bookshop called Resistance Books in Wellington's Willis Street. After completing his bachelor degree with honours, Campbell became a junior lecturer specializing in economic history. He subsequently completed a Masters in the philosophy of economic history at Massey University.

== Trade union career ==
Campbell subsequently abandoned plans to pursue an academic career to focus on trade union activism. With the encouragement of trade unionist Pat Kelly, Campbell helped to negotiate a pay increase for road transport drivers. During the 1970s, Campbell joined and worked for several unions including the Public Service Association, the Distribution Worker's Federation and the Federation of Labour (FOL), the predecessor to the New Zealand Council of Trade Unions (CTU). Campbell has said he was motivated by the "intellectual challenge of the work" along with his interest in lifting low wages and improving working conditions. At the time, the New Zealand trade union movement was seeking to attract people with intellect and academic qualifications.

During the 1980s, Campbell rose to prominence in both the trade union and left-wing movements. He served as secretary of the Distribution Workers Federation and was a member of the Federation of Labour's executive, where he campaigned for more racial and gender diversity within the union leadership. In addition, Campbell co-authored a book called After the Freeze, which became an economic strategy book for unions. Campbell was also mentored by prominent trade unionists and Socialist Unity Party (SUP) leaders Bill Andersen and Ken Douglas. Campbell's association with Communist figures led Prime Minister Robert Muldoon to accuse him of being an "undercover communist" and a member of the SUP, which he refused to confirm nor deny.

== Business career ==
In 1987, Campbell resigned from both the Distribution Workers' Federation and the FOL to take up directorship roles on the boards of several private companies including the Bank of New Zealand and Sir Ron Brierley's Guinness Peat Group (GPG). Due to his actions, Campbell was condemned by many in the trade union movement as an "academic sellout and turncoat, spurning working class ideals in favour of capitalism." Campbell attributed his transition from trade unionism into corporate governance to two factors: the inability of unions to adapt to the changes caused by Rogernomics and the stress caused by union work on his mental health and cancer. In addition to his trade union work, Campbell also served on the national executive of the New Zealand Labour Party during the late 1980s.

Campbell was later recruited by Trevor Farmer, the-then chief executive of Freightways and Associated Companies. For the next 20 years, Campbell shunned media attention and other publicity opportunities in order to focus on his corporate career and work for various boards. Campbell later worked as a director and investment manager for investment company Tappenden Holdings. In 2009, Campbell left Tappenden and served as the director of several companies including the state-owned enterprise Accident Compensation Corporation (ACC) and his own investment company Tutanekai. In September 2010, Campbell was appointed to the board of Guinness Peat Group as part of a shakeup of the under-performing company. June 2011, Campbell was appointed as chairman of both GPG and its fresh produce subsidiary Turners & Growers; ousting Turners & Growers' former chairman Tony Gibbs in the process.

Campbell later joined retirement home operator Summerset Holdings and tourism investment company Tourism Holdings, guiding the companies through successful expansions. In late December 2017, Campbell was appointed as chairman of the gambling and entertainment company SkyCity Entertainment Group, which he assumed in 2018. During the COVID-19 pandemic in New Zealand, SkyCity and Summerset Holdings drew criticism for accepting wage subsidies from the New Zealand Government in 2020 while undertaking opportunistic behaviour; with the former laying off 900 employees and the latter declaring a substantial profit and shareholder dividend a few months later. Campbell justified the companies' actions by arguing that both the wage subsidies and layoffs were necessary to ensure their survival and future growth. In December 2020, Summerset Holdings repaid its NZ$8.6 million wage subsidy.

== Public service career ==
In mid February 2021, Campbell was elected as Auckland University of Technology's chancellor by the university's Council. By February 2021, he was chairing several organisations including the SkyCity Entertainment Ltd, Group Summerset Group Ltd, Tourism Holdings Ltd, WEL Networks Ltd, Ara Ake Ltd, NZ Rural Land Co Ltd.

In September 2021, Campbell was appointed as Chair of Te Whatu Ora (Health New Zealand) by Health Minister Andrew Little and Associate Health Minister Peeni Henare. Te Whatu Ora is the national health service that was formed through the merger of 20 district health boards.

In December 2021, Campbell was appointed as the new board chair of the national environmental regulator, the Environmental Protection Authority (EPA).

In late February 2023, Campbell criticised the opposition National Party's campaign proposal to scrap the Labour Government's Three Waters reform programme in a LinkedIn post and accused the party's leader Christopher Luxon of "dog whistling" on the issue of co-governance. Campbell's remarks were criticised by several National and ACT MPs including Simeon Brown and David Seymour, who accused him of breaching the Public Service Commission's policy requiring the directors of Crown entities to remain politically neutral. Campbell defended his remarks, stating that they were made in his capacity as a private citizen and denied that he had violated the Commission's political neutrality policy.

On 27 February 2023, Prime Minister Chris Hipkins criticised Campbell's Three Waters remarks as "inappropriate." On 28 February, Health minister Ayesha Verrall used her discretionary powers under section 36 of the Crown Entities Act 2004 to relieve Campbell of his position as head of Te Whatu Ora. Though Campbell had apologised to Luxon and Verrall, the latter had demanded that he resign by 10:30 am on 28 February. Campbell had refused to resign but offered Verrall an apology and a "protocol" to handle future incidents, which was rejected. On 2 March, Environment Minister David Parker removed Campbell from his positions as chair and board member of the EPA over his Three Waters remarks.

== Views and positions ==
=== Economics ===
During a speech to the Parnell Rotary Club in July 2017, Campbell argued that business and ethics were inseparable, stating that "if our model is extractive or exploitative we will all bear the downsides of that."

=== Health services ===
In March 2023, Campbell likened the New Zealand health system to a "blocked digestive system" and advocated redeploying hundreds of duplicated jobs from the former district health board system to the frontline. Following his dismissal as Chair of Te Whatu Ora, he alleged that the health system had a "troubling culture" where those pushing for change were afraid to speak out for fear and losing their jobs. He also advocated shifting more funding towards kaupapa (cultural) Māori health services and increasing input from marginalised groups such as multi-ethnic, the disabled, LGBTQI communities, and women's health advocates.

=== Social justice ===
In 2017, he argued that gender diversity, Māori identity, and New Zealand's nuclear-free policy were inseparable from "the removal of economic restrictions and regulations".

== Personal life and community involvement ==
Campbell is married to Judi Lambourne. He is a vegetarian, teetotaler, and drives an electric vehicle.

He is also involved with David Letele's BBM exercise community in Manukau, Auckland. As of 2020, Campbell chaired BBM's charitable trust and is a close friend and advisor of Letele. Through BBM's charitable trust and his corporate connections, Campbell has provided a range of social services to people from working class and socially disadvantaged backgrounds in Auckland including mentorship and financial assistance.

== Awards ==
In December 2017, Campbell was awarded both the Deloitte Top 200 chairperson of the year and the New Zealand Shareholders Association Beacon Award for business leader of the year.

In 2019, he was awarded a Companion of the New Zealand Order of Merit for services to business.
