= Metlifecare =

Retirement village provider

Metlifecare Ltd
- Type: Private
- Traded as: NZX: MET (1994 – 2020)
- Industry: Retirement Village Operator and Aged Residential Care
- Founded: 1994 (IPO)
- Founder: Cliff Cook
- Headquarters: Auckland, New Zealand
- Areas served: NZ
- Key people: CEO - Earl Gasparich, Chairman - Paul McClintock, CFO - Jonathan Wilde
- Products: Retirement villages
- Owner: EQT Infrastructure
- Number of employees: 2000+ (2024)
- Website: www.metlifecare.co.nz

Metlifecare is one of New Zealand's largest retirement village providers. They currently own and operate 43 retirement villages throughout the North Island of New Zealand.

They have been listed on the NZX since 1994, and the Australian ASX main board since October 2013, until 2020, when the company was acquired by EQT Infrastructure Fund.

Competitors of Metlifecare include BUPA, Ryman Healthcare and Summerset Holdings.

== History ==
Metlifecare was founded and first listed on the NZX in 1994 by NZ businessman Cliff Cook. Cook is no longer involved with the company but is now developing other retirement village projects in the UK.

Metlifecare acquired the Private Life Care assets of Retirement Villages New Zealand Limited and Vision Senior Living Limited in May 2012 as part of a three way merger. This grew Metlifecare to a village portfolio of 25 as at December 2015.

Major investors in Metlifecare now include Infratil, one of New Zealand's largest infrastructure investor, in partnership with the New Zealand Superannuation Fund.

In December 2019, Metlifecare received an unsolicited buyout offer from EQT Management, a Swedish funds manager. In 2020 Metlifecare entered a Scheme Implementation Agreement with Asia Pacific Village Group (APVG), owned by Swedish equity firm EQT, to acquire 100% of Metlifecare’s shares. The company was subsequently delisted from the NZX (New Zealand Stock Exchange).

In 2021 a new CEO, Earl Gasparich, was appointed.
