= Summerset Holdings =

New Zealand retirement village operator

Summerset Group Holdings Limited
- Company type: Public
- Traded as: NZX: SUM
- Industry: Aged care and retirement villages
- Founded: 1994
- Founder: John O’Sullivan
- Headquarters: Wellington, New Zealand
- Areas served: New Zealand
- Key people: CEO - Scott Scoullar, Chairman - Mark Verbiest
- Number of employees: 1200+ (2018)
- Website: www.summerset.co.nz

Summerset Holdings Limited (NZX: SUM) is a New Zealand retirement village and aged care service provider. They are listed on the NZX and are part of the NZX 50 index, with a market capitalisation of nearly $2.3 billion NZD.

== History ==
Summerset Group Holdings Ltd was founded in 1994 by John O'Sullivan, a Wellington-based property developer initially opening a small hospital in Levin that year and a similar one in Waikanae in 1995. In 1997 the first retirement village with a hospital and rest home was opened in Wanganui. This was followed by a rapid period of growth with approx. one new village opened each year until 2001 to reach 9 sites, mainly within the Lower North Island. The head office was originally located in Paraparaumu.

At the end of 2005 O'Sullivan and the small group of other shareholders sold the business to AMP Capital Investors for $125m. In 2007 AMP sold the two original hospital sites in Levin and Waikanae (branded Millvale House) so the company could concentrate on its core business of retirement village offerings.

It has 23 retirement villages with 4700 residents, with a further six villages for construction. They offer a range of care from independent living to dementia, hospital and rest home nursing care.

Summerset listed on the NZX in November 2011, raising capital to increase its growth plans to cater for the increasing retirement population in Auckland. At the time of its listing it had 13 retirement villages. The current Chief Executive of Summerset Group Holdings Ltd is Julian Cook.

Competition for Summerset in the New Zealand aged care sector includes Ryman Healthcare, Metlifecare, BUPA, Arvida and Oceania.
