= NZ Bus =

Bus operator in New Zealand

- Logo used from 2005-2023
- Formerly: Stagecoach New Zealand
- Type: Private
- Industry: Public transport
- Founded: October 1992
- Founder: Stagecoach Group
- Defunct: 2023
- Owner: Kinetic Group
- Website: www.wearekinetic.com

NZ Bus was a New Zealand bus company, operating in Auckland, Tauranga and Wellington. Originally a subsidiary of Stagecoach Group, and formerly Infratil and Next Capital, as of 2022 it is owned and operated by Kinetic Group. It was merged with Kinetic's other NZ subsidiary, Go Bus Transport, in 2023 to create Kinetic Urban NZ.

== History ==
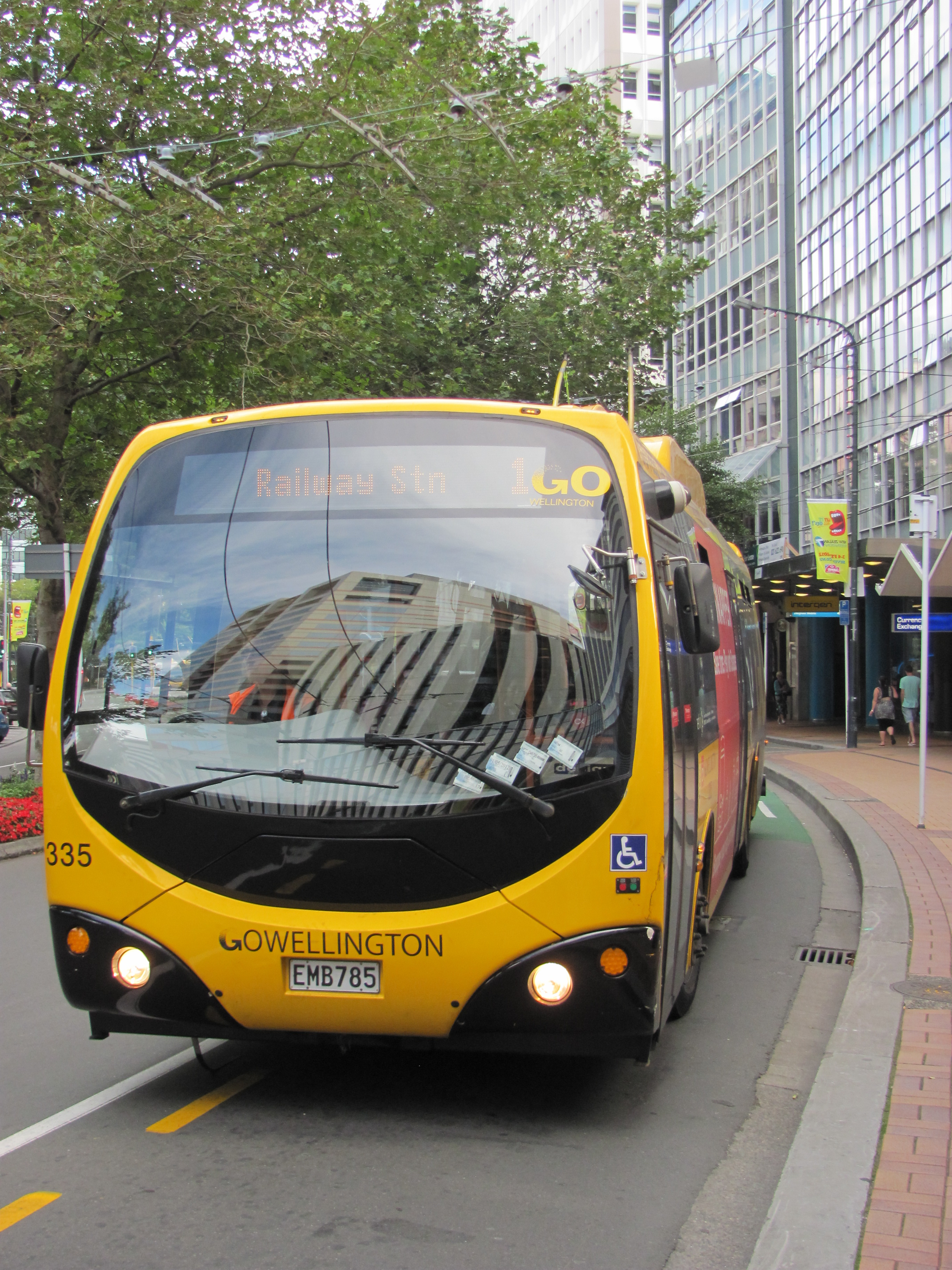
DesignLine bodied trolleybus in the Go Wellington livery in Wellington

In October 1992 Stagecoach purchased Wellington City Transport (WCT), the largest bus-operator in Wellington, from Wellington City Council with 270 buses. WCT had recently purchased the Auckland, Hutt Valley and north Wellington suburban bus operations of New Zealand Railways Road Services, then branded CityLine.

Stagecoach expanded its Auckland operations in 1998 by purchasing Transportation Auckland Corporation (trading as The Yellow Bus Company) from the Auckland Regional Council with 538 buses.

in November 2005 Infratil purchased the business. As part of the deal, Infratil had the right to use the "Stagecoach" name and livery for five years from the sale.

In January 2008 the company bought Whangārei school and charter business Adams Travelines (later rebranded as NorthBus), which has since won the tender to provide the urban bus service for Whangārei as Citylink Whangarei, using super-low-floor buses. In May 2013 NorthBus was sold to Ritchies Transport.

In April 2016 NZ Bus announced that it would repower several buses with Wrightspeed gas-turbine hybrid powertrains. In February 2017 NZ Bus announced it would begin the trial of a BYD K9 electric bus in Auckland and Wellington.

In 2018 NZ Bus planned to reduce the size of its Wellington operations from 73% to 28% of the city's bus routes following a re-tender; many bus-route services passed to Tranzit Group.

In September 2019, Infratil sold NZ Bus to Australian equity buyers Next Capital for A$218–240 million, including a vendor loan of A$20–30 million. At the time of the sale, NZ Bus operated 720 buses and had 1,400 staff. In March 2022, the business was purchased by the Kinetic Group, and rebranded as Kinetic Urban NZ.

=== Company rebranding ===
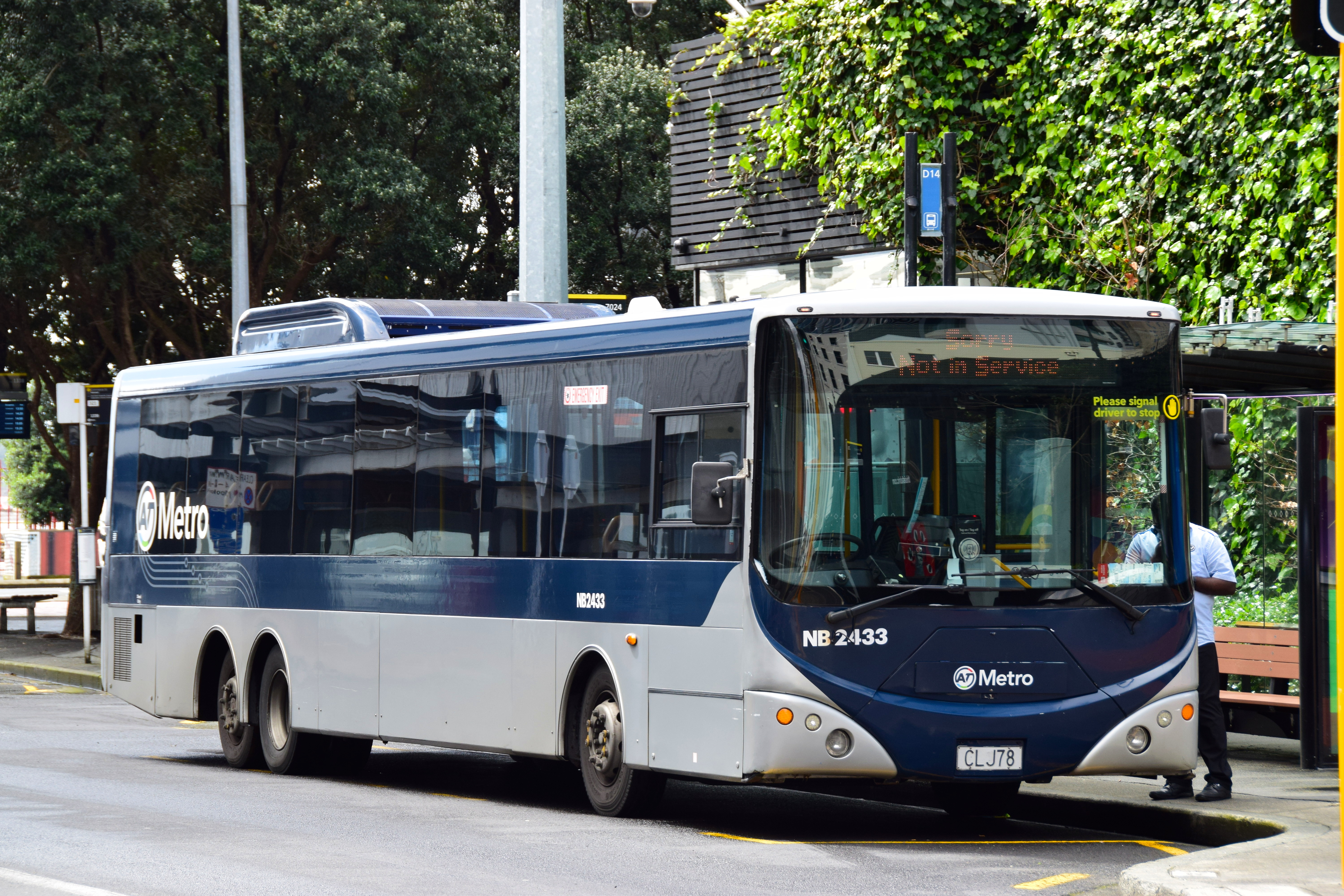
A MAN 17.223 in AT Metro livery in Auckland

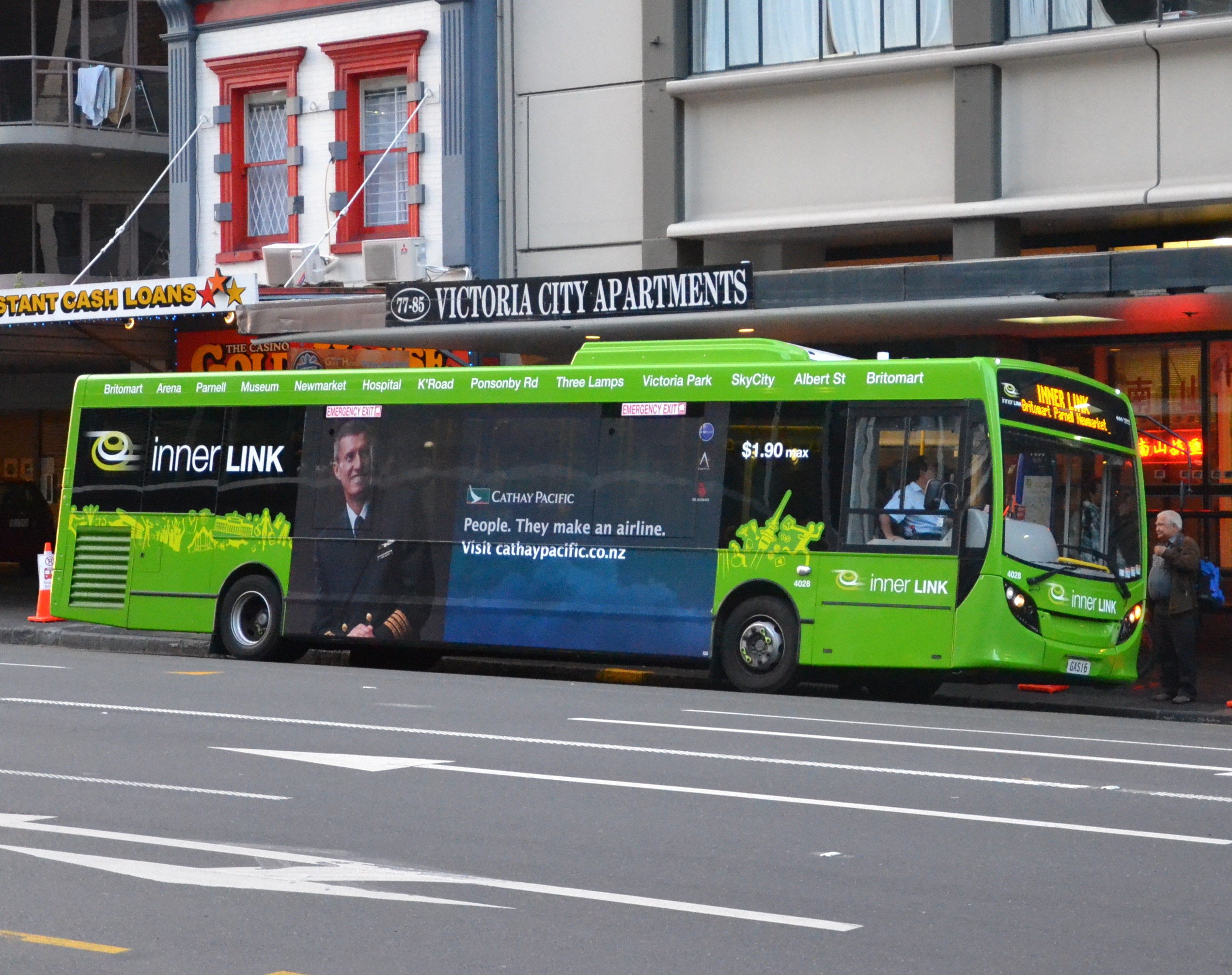
An Alexander Dennis Ltd Envrio 200 in InnerLink livery with Metrolink branding in Auckland

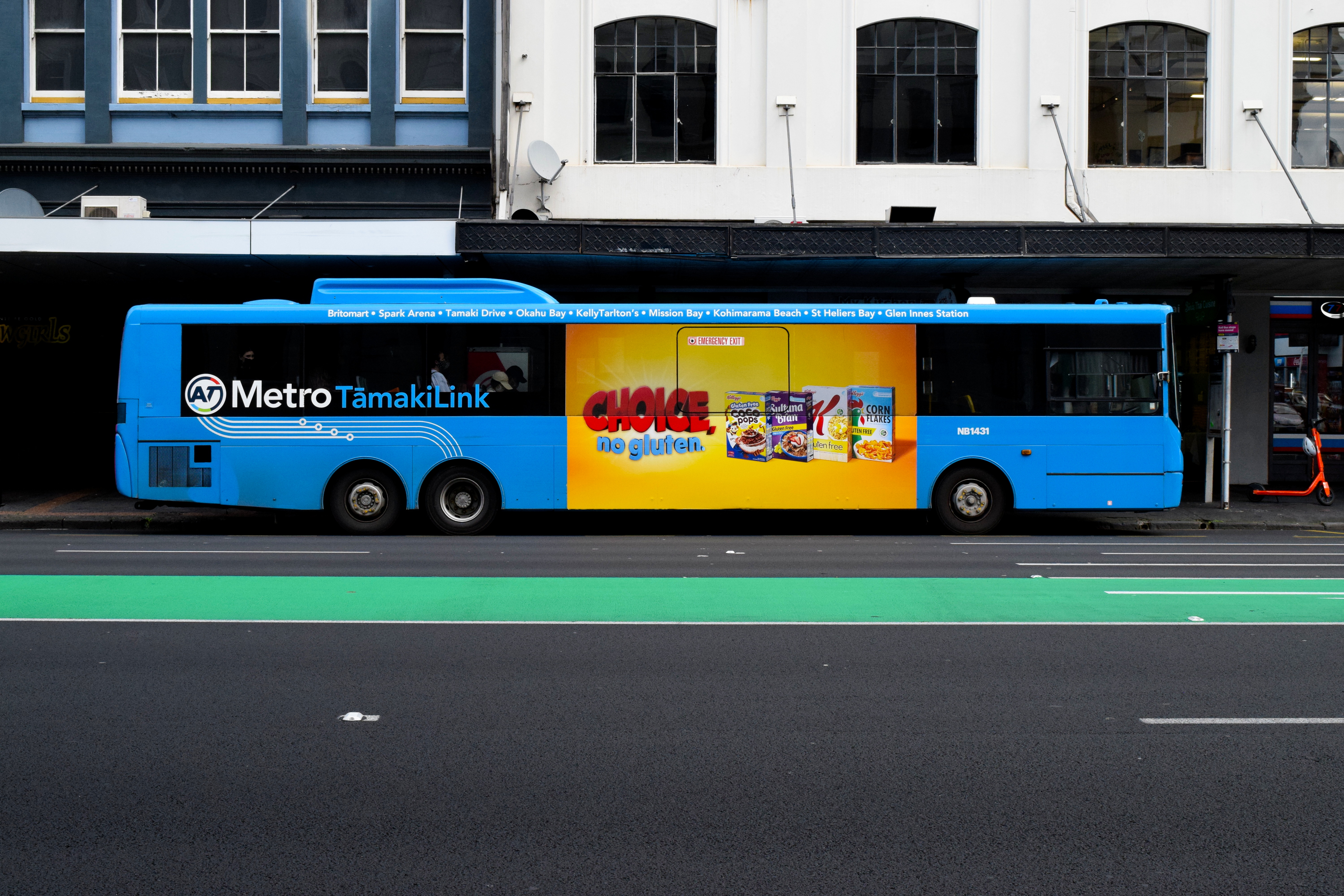
A TāmakiLink wrapped MAN 17.223 in Auckland

Former name	Depots	New name	Notes
Stagecoach Auckland	North Shore; Hibiscus Coast	North Star	Rebranded on 4 December 2006. Blue and yellow livery.
Stagecoach Auckland	Swanson	Go West AT Metro	Rebranded in 2017, with the new Western Bus Network. Blue and silver with AT Metro logo livery.
Stagecoach Auckland	Auckland Central (City); Mt Roskill; Panmure	Metrolink	Rebranded on 12 October 2008. Blue and silver and grey livery.
Stagecoach Auckland	Auckland Central (City)	Link Buses Metrolink	Red colour for City Link Green colour for Inner Link Orange colour for Outer Link Blue colour for Tamaki Link Metrolink purple and silver for all other buses AT blue and silver
Stagecoach Auckland	Wiri	Waka Pacific AT Metro	Rebranded on 16 February 2009. Silver livery, with multi-coloured patterns influenced by traditional Maori designs. Rebranded in 2016, with the new Southern Bus Network. Blue and silver with AT Metro logo livery.
Stagecoach Wellington	Various	Go Wellington	Announced in November 2006. Operating since early 2007. Yellow and black livery. Rebranded from April 2018 as part of the new bus network for Metlink. Lime green blue and yellow with Metlink logo livery.
Cityline Hutt Valley	Various	Valley Flyer	Rebranded on 21 November 2007. Purple and yellow livery.

From late 2015, plans called for all buses operated by NZ Bus in Auckland to gradually begin to appear in AT Metro colours as part of Auckland Transport's initiative to create one brand for the Auckland transport network. Link services continued to operate in their red, green and orange branding, but with AT Metro logos and other symbols instead of Metrolink. Similarly, Wellington buses operated under contract to the regional council are now branded in Metlink livery, rather than in GO Wellington or Valley Flyer livery.

=== Smart card ticketing ===
On 20 April 2008 NZ Bus confirmed that it would start using a new ticketing system to make bus travel quicker, easier and simpler for passengers in Wellington. The new system, called Snapper, builds on RFID technology embedded in cards or in portable devices such as USB sticks. Use of the system started on 4 April 2008, being piloted on Go Wellington bus route 17 over the following two months. The supplier of the technology is Korea Smart Card (established in 2003), a joint venture between Seoul Metropolitan Government and LG Group, which has introduced T-money to six major cities in Korea.

NZ Bus fitted out its Auckland fleet with Snapper-capable equipment in 2011, despite losing a contract to provide smart-card ticketing to all public transport services in the Auckland Region. NZ Bus went ahead with their Snapper roll-out in Auckland despite no other public transport providers signing up for it. Auckland Transport rolled out their own smart-card ticketing system, the AT HOP card. All public transport operators in Auckland, including NZ Bus, were required by law to accept smart cards issued by Auckland Transport. NZ Bus suggested that their Snapper system would be able to accommodate Auckland Transport's smart cards.

By late 2013, the use of Snapper had completely phased out in Auckland. In Wellington and Whangārei, Snapper is the interim region-wide bus ticketing system for the Metlink network in Wellington.

== See also ==
- Kinetic Group
- AT Metro
- AT Hop card
- Metlink
- Snapper card
