= GO Wellington =

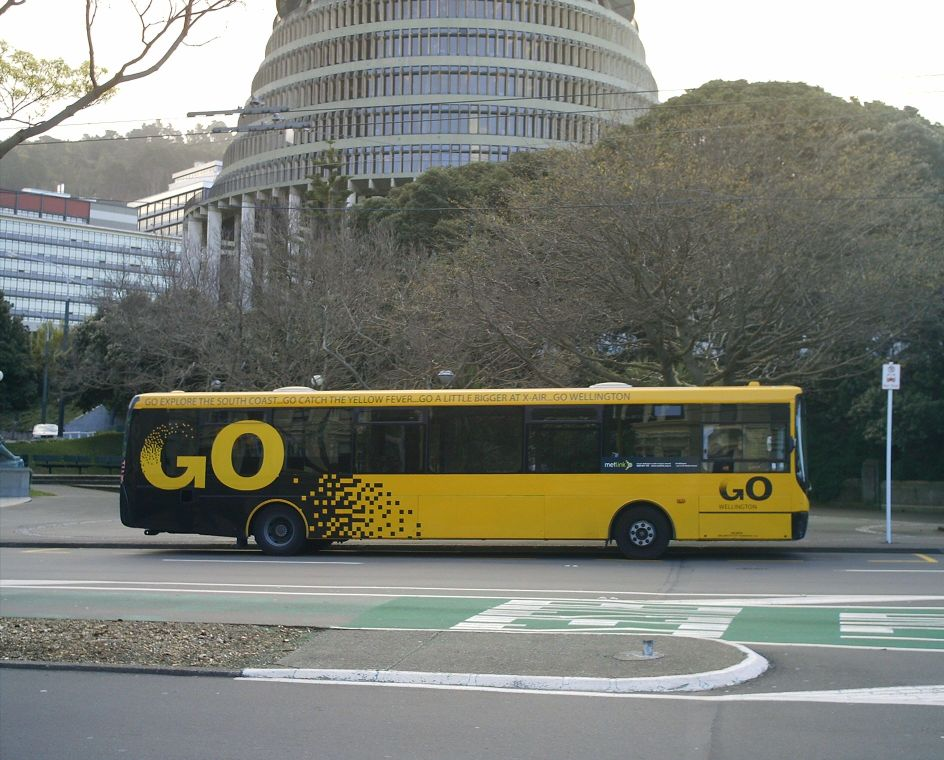
- Bus in GO Wellington livery
- Parent: NZ Bus (Infratil)
- Locale: New Zealand
- Service area: Wellington
- Service type: Public transport in Wellington
- Fuel type: Diesel, electricity
- Website: gowellingtonbus.co.nz

GO Wellington was the brand name of Wellington City Transport Ltd, the Wellington subsidiary of NZ Bus, in New Zealand. The company was branded Stagecoach Wellington by its previous owner, the Stagecoach Group. The current name and a new livery were announced in November 2006 by NZ Bus owner Infratil.

== History ==
Wellington City Transport operated trams, buses, a cable car and trolley buses, tracing its history back to 1904. It built and operated the first municipal electric tramway system in New Zealand. Later the department acquired the cable car company.

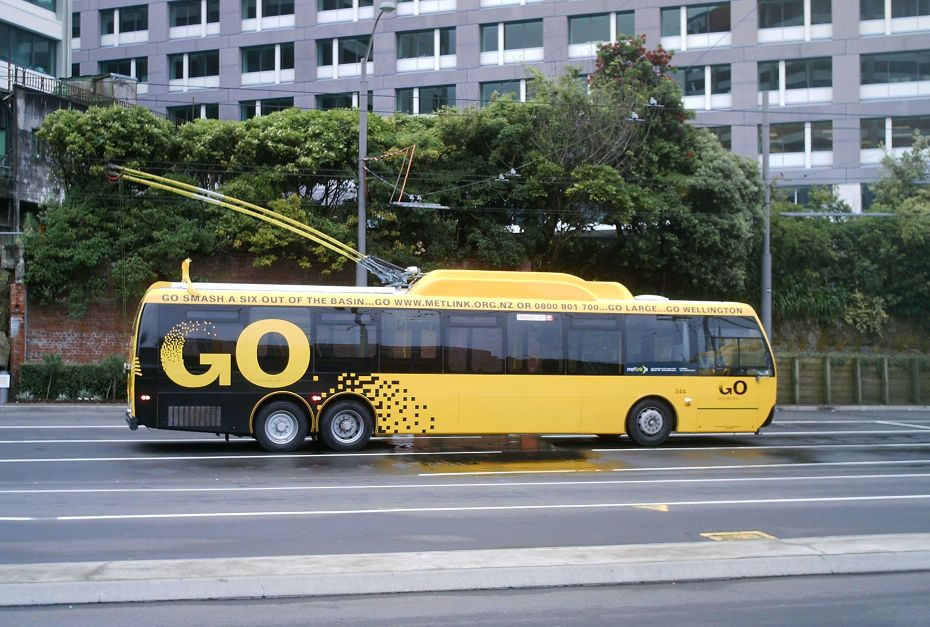
Designline trolleybus 344

On 24 September 2008, a strike occurred between Go Wellington and the Wellington Tramways Union. Drivers went on strike between 7.30 am and 8.30 am, the middle of the morning rush hour. The dispute was escalated when the company moved to lock out its drivers, taking the company's 222 buses off the road the following day. The lockout ended on 25 September when the union withdrew its strike notice. Union secretary Kevin O'Sullivan told The New Zealand Herald that the union's push for higher wages would continue.

In April 2016, NZ Bus announced that it would repower several buses with Wrightspeed gas-turbine hybrid powertrains.

From July 2018, all services in Wellington are operated under the Metlink brand and the GO Wellington brand has ceased to be used by NZ Bus. After losing the majority of its contracts in the area, the company still operates several routes, including two frequent services, out of its depots in Kaiwharawhara, Kilbirnie, and Karori.

== See also ==
- Trolleybuses in Wellington
- Public transport in the Wellington Region
- Transport in New Zealand
