= Ryman Healthcare =

New Zealand rest home operator

Ryman Healthcare Limited
- Type: Public
- Traded as: NZX: RYM ASX: RYM
- Industry: Aged Care
- Founded: 1984 founded, 1999 IPO
- Founders: John Ryder, Kevin Hickman
- Headquarters: Christchurch, New Zealand
- Areas served: NZ, Australia
- Key people: Executive Chair – Dean Hamilton CEO – Naomi James CFO – Matt Prior
- Products: Retirement villages and aged care
- Owner: Public listing company (NZX and ASX)
- Number of employees: 5000+
- Website: www.rymanhealthcare.co.nz

Ryman Healthcare Limited is a New Zealand retirement village and rest home operator. It is listed on the New Zealand Stock Exchange and was one of the largest companies listed on the NZX 50 Index.

Ryman Healthcare has 48 operational villages across New Zealand and eight in Melbourne, and is developing further villages in New Zealand and Victoria (Australia). Its name is a portmanteau of its two founders, John Ryder and Kevin Hickman, who founded the company in 1984.

As at June 2024, Ryman Healthcare has a market capitalisation of over $2.6 Billion NZD.

Ryman's business model is a mixture of property development and healthcare services. It operates on a "deferred management fees" model where the village resident pays for a lifetime occupancy use of their apartment or unit, and upon moving out, the resident or their estate receives a lesser sum back for their unit, capped at 20% deducted if over a five-year period.

Ryman Healthcare villages offer a blend of different retirement living options at their villages, which are usually large enough to support a mini-hospital for residents and a secure dementia wing. Ryman describe this as a "continuum of care" where residents can remain in the Ryman village of choice, whether it is for independent retirement living, rest home care, dementia or hospital care. All villages are named after Kiwi or Australian "trailblazers".

Ryman expanded into Australia in 2012, buying a site for development in Wheelers Hill, in eastern Melbourne, Victoria. Ryman has since purchased another eight sites for development at Brandon Park, Burwood East, Coburg, Mt Eliza, Mt Martha, Aberfeldie, Ocean Grove and Geelong.

== Company performance ==
Ryman Healthcare has demonstrated significant profit and share price performance since its inception. For the last five years, it has managed earnings growth of over 15% per annum. Ryman has delivered 15 years of consecutive record earnings results since 2002. Ryman employs over 6700 people, including in house development teams, builders and tradespeople, nursing and caregivers, cooks, cleaners, sales and support staff. Ryman villages are home to more than 13,200 residents.

== Awards ==
Ryman Healthcare have won a number of awards for business and healthcare, including:

- Inclusion as one of the top 10 healthcare companies in the world in the Boston Consulting Group's Annual Value Creators Rankings
- Simon Challies, Ryman Healthcare's CEO, won Best CEO of 2014 in the Deloitte Top 200 Awards in 2014.
- Dr David Kerr, Ryman Healthcare's Chairman of the Board of Directors, won best Chairman in the Deloitte Top 200 Awards in 2013.
- Reader's Digest "Most Trusted Brand New Zealand 2015, 2016, 2018, 2019, 2020, 2022."
- Workbase Best Growth Strategy Award.

== The Ryman Prize ==
In 2015 Ryman Healthcare announced it was supporting the launch of the Ryman Prize.

The Ryman Prize is an annual $250,000 NZD for the best idea, innovation or advance in the world that enhances quality of life for older people. It is a philanthropic initiative administered by The Ryman Foundation. Hollows Foundation founding director Gabi Hollows won the inaugural Ryman Prize for her decades of work to restore the sight of more than 1 million people with preventable blindness.

Alzheimer's Disease researcher Professor Henry Brodaty won the 2016 prize. Professor Brodaty, who lives in Sydney, is Scientia Professor of Ageing and Mental Health, the founding Director of the Dementia Collaborative Research Centre and Co-Director of CHeBA, the Centre for Healthy Brain Ageing at the University of New South Wales.

The 2017 Ryman Prize went to Professor Peter St George-Hyslop. Professor St George-Hyslop is a medical scientist, neurologist and molecular geneticist who is known for his research into neurodegenerative diseases. He has identified a number of key genes that are responsible for nerve cell degeneration and early-onset forms of Alzheimer's disease. He splits his time between the University of Cambridge and the University of Toronto where he has research labs.

Professor Takanori Shibata was awarded the 2018 Ryman Prize in recognition of his more than 25 years of ground-breaking research into new technology to help older people.

Professor Shibata, an artificial intelligence (AI) and robotics pioneer, was presented with the prize by the Right Honourable Jacinda Ardern, Prime Minister of New Zealand.

The 2019 Ryman Prize was awarded to Dr Michael Fehlings, a Canadian neurosurgeon, for his pioneering research into degenerative cervical myelopathy (DCM), a spinal disorder that affects older people.

The 2020 Ryman Prize went to Dr. Miia Kivipelto of Finland, for her work on cognitive impairment, Alzheimer's disease, and dementia.

The 2021 Ryman prize was awarded to Dr. Kenneth Rockwood of Dalhousie University in Halifax, Nova Scotia, for his work on a geriatric Frailty index, done jointly with Dr. Arnold Mitnitski, also of Dalhousie University.

The 2022 Ryman Prize was awarded to Professor Perminder Sachdev, neuropsychiatrist and Scientia Professor at the University of New South Wales in Sydney for his more than 30 years of research into the causes and treatment of psychiatric disorders including dementia.
