= Auckland Transport =

Transport organisation in Auckland, New Zealand

- Type: Council-controlled organisation
- Predecessor: Auckland Regional Transport Authority and the transport functions of the former councils
- Founded: 1 November 2010 (16 years ago)
- Headquarters: Viaduct Harbour, Auckland, New Zealand
- Area served: Auckland Region
- Key people: Andrew Ritchie; Chair, Stacey van der Putten; Interim chief executive
- Services: Delivery of public transport services; Operation and maintenance of public transport infrastructure
- Revenue: $3.2 billion (2025–26)
- Owner: Auckland Council
- Number of employees: 1,999 (June 2026), about 650 (October 2026)
- Website: at.govt.nz

Auckland Transport (AT) is the council-controlled organisation (CCO) of Auckland Council responsible for delivering public transport services and maintaining public transport infrastructure across the Auckland region. AT began operating on 1 November 2010, the day Auckland Council was formed. It absorbed the Auckland Regional Transport Authority and the transport departments of the seven territorial authorities that the new council replaced.

AT plans, funds and coordinates bus, train and ferry services. AT does not control rail tracks and platforms, which are owned by KiwiRail.

The Local Government (Auckland Council) (Transport Governance) Amendment Act 2026 took effect on 7 May 2026. It transferred most roading and transport planning functions to Auckland Council and established the Auckland Regional Transport Committee. AT was reconstituted as a transport CCO focused on public transport delivery and operation of public transport infrastructure, with a six-month transition period ending 1 October 2026. AT's headquarters are in the Viaduct Harbour, Auckland.

== History ==
=== Establishment ===
Before 2010, responsibility for transport in the Auckland region was split between the Auckland Regional Council, seven territorial authorities, Transit New Zealand (later the NZ Transport Agency) and ONTRACK. The Auckland Regional Transport Authority (ARTA) was established on 1 July 2004 under the Local Government (Auckland) Amendment Act 2004 as a subsidiary of the Auckland Regional Council. ARTA planned and funded bus, train and ferry services and prepared the Regional Land Transport Programme, but did not own or control local roads.

In 2009 the Royal Commission on Auckland Governance recommended a single unitary council for the region. The Fifth National Government adopted a modified version of the recommendation. The Local Government (Auckland Council) Act 2009 established Auckland Council and, at section 38, created Auckland Transport as a council-controlled organisation.

Auckland Transport began operating on 1 November 2010, the day Auckland Council came into existence. It absorbed ARTA and the transport departments of the Auckland Regional Council and the seven territorial authorities: Auckland City, Manukau City, North Shore City, Waitakere City, Rodney District, Papakura District and Franklin District. Around 846 staff transferred to the new organisation on its first day.

Mark Ford, who had led the Auckland Transition Agency, was the inaugural chair. In August 2010 the agency named David Warburton interim chief executive on a fixed term to 30 June 2012. Warburton was then chief executive for Australia and New Zealand of CPG, an infrastructure and consulting company owned by Downer EDI, and had earlier been chief executive of Wanganui District Council. AT operated under the Local Government (Auckland Council) Act 2009, the Local Government (Auckland Transitional Provisions) Act 2010 and the Land Transport Management Act 2003.

=== Early years ===
Three inherited projects were finished in 2011, including the East Coast Road upgrade, Lake Road widening in Devonport, and a package of road works at New Lynn, including the Clark Street extension. AT additionally inherited rail electrification, the City Rail Link, Auckland Manukau Eastern Transport Initiative (AMETI), Penlink and the Mill Road corridor large-scale projects. AT also took on a contract with Thales for an integrated ticketing smartcard system. Before it was ready, NZ Bus introduced a Snapper-based version of a HOP card, and a dispute followed over integration. AT terminated the Snapper arrangement in 2012 and launched the Thales system as the AT HOP card.

That year, AT began to retire the MAXX public transport brand, later rebranding it as AT Metro. The government funded rail electrification, and AT ordered 57 three-car AM class units from CAF of Spain. Manukau railway station and the 2km Manukau rail branch opened in April 2012. Veolia's rail operating contract was renewed and the operator was renamed Transdev Auckland in 2013. The first electric services ran on the Onehunga Line on 28 April 2014; diesels were withdrawn from the electrified network in July 2015.

Lester Levy replaced Ford as chair in 2012. In 2013 the government and Auckland Council reached agreement in principle to fund the City Rail Link, a 3.45-kilometre underground rail line between Britomart and Mount Eden. Enabling works began in Lower Queen Street in December 2015. The project was transferred to City Rail Link Limited, jointly owned by the Crown and the council, in 2017.

AMETI was then AT's largest construction project. Work began in October 2011 with the Mountain Road bridge and a busway bridge over the Ellerslie-Panmure Highway. The rebuilt Panmure station and interchange, costing $17.5 million, opened in January 2014. Te Horeta Road, a 1.5 km link with a 220-metre tunnel, opened on 2 November 2014.

Other road projects of the period included the Glenfield Road upgrade and the Taharoto and Wairau Road upgrade, both completed in 2013; and the Tiverton and Wolverton four-laning, completed in March 2014. Construction of the Albany Highway North upgrade began in November 2014.

AT's walking and cycling programme expanded under the government's Urban Cycleways Programme, which co-funded routes including the Northwestern cycleway extensions, Quay Street and the Waterview shared path. The Beach Road cycleway, the first separated on-road cycleway in New Zealand, opened in June 2015, and the Nelson Street cycleway and Lightpath opened in December 2015.

=== Rapid transit and public transport improvements ===
From 2013 AT consulted on the New Network, a bus redesign replacing direct routes with frequent routes and feeders. It was rolled out in South Auckland in October 2016, the west in June 2017, the east in December 2017, the isthmus in July 2018, and the North Shore in September 2018. Zone-based fares replaced stage fares in August 2016. New bus interchanges opened at Ōtāhuhu and Manukau to cater for more transfers. The New Network was procured under the Public Transport Operating Model (PTOM), introduced by the Land Transport Management Amendment Act 2013. Between 2015 and 2018 AT re-tendered all bus units.

In 2015 AT proposed light rail on central isthmus corridors to relieve bus congestion in the city centre, later focussing mainly on a Dominion Road line. The Sixth Labour Government took over the project as Auckland Light Rail in 2017. It was converted to a metro project, never reached construction and the National-led government cancelled it in January 2024.

Patronage rose from about 70 million boardings in the year to June 2013 to 100 million in the year to June 2019. AT ordered a further 15 AM class units in 2017 to meet rail demand, bringing the fleet to 72 by 2019.

The Auckland Transport Alignment Project, published in 2016 and revised in 2018, set out $28 billion of spending over ten years. To fund the council's share, a regional fuel tax of 11.5 cents a litre took effect on 1 July 2018. AT created the role of Transport Officer in 2017 to enforce fares. Proposals for cycleways in Grey Lynn and Westmere drew organised local opposition in 2017 and 2018 and AT paused the Grey Lynn works.

Warburton retired in 2017. Shane Ellison became chief executive in December 2017. Levy stepped down in 2019 and Adrienne Young-Cooper replaced him as chair. Road deaths on Auckland roads peaked at 64 in 2017. AT adopted a Vision Zero strategy in 2019 and its Speed Limits Bylaw 2019 lowered limits on about 700 roads from 30 June 2020, including 30 km/h in the city centre.

=== COVID-19 and recovery (2020–2022) ===
In January 2020 the government took over the Penlink and Mill Road projects under the New Zealand Upgrade Programme, with NZTA as delivery agent.

Public transport patronage then fell sharply during the national lockdown of March and April 2020 and the Auckland lockdown of August to December 2021.

In 2020 a council review of its CCOs, chaired by Miriam Dean, found a lack of trust between AT and the council and recommended changes to accountability and communication. In August 2022 the council adopted the Transport Emissions Reduction Pathway, which set a target of a 64 per cent cut in transport emissions by 2030.

A shortage of bus drivers led to widespread public transport cancellations from 2021. At its peak in late 2022 AT was short about 500 drivers and had suspended more than 1,000 trips a day. The government's half-price fare scheme ran from April 2022 to July 2023. Auckland One Rail, a joint venture of ComfortDelGro and UGL, replaced Transdev as rail operator in January 2022. AT ordered a further 23 AM class units in 2020 for the extension of electric services to Pukekohe. The line south of Papakura closed in August 2022 for electrification and reopened in February 2025 with new stations under construction at Drury, Paerātā and Ngākōroa.

The $69 million Puhinui Station interchange opened on 26 July 2021 and connected the rail network to the AirportLink bus. Stage 1 of the Eastern Busway, from Panmure to Pakūranga, opened in December 2021. AT and the council completed the $350 million Downtown programme on Quay Street in 2021, including the seawall strengthening, the Lower Albert Street bus interchange, six new ferry berths at Queens Wharf and the Te Wānanga public space. The Karangahape Road upgrade was completed the same year and the Tāmaki Drive cycleway in 2022.

Ellison announced his resignation in 2021 and left in mid-2022. Mark Lambert acted as chief executive until Dean Kimpton, a former chief operating officer of Auckland Council, took up the role in 2023.

=== Relations with Auckland Council (2022–2024) ===
Wayne Brown was elected mayor in October 2022 on a promise to "take back control" of the council's CCOs including AT in particular. He criticised the board, executive salaries, raised pedestrian crossings and the cycleway programme, and sought the resignation of several directors. Young-Cooper resigned as chair in 2023 shortly after his election and Richard Leggat replaced her. The Point Chevalier to Westmere upgrade, paused in October 2022 partly at the direction of Brown, resumed in December 2023 and was completed in 2025.

KiwiRail's Rail Network Rebuild, a programme of track and formation renewal ahead of the City Rail Link opening, closed sections of the network for extended periods between 2023 and 2025 and replaced trains with buses. Rail patronage recovered more slowly than bus patronage.

The government repealed the regional fuel tax from 30 June 2024. In 2024 AT introduced a $50 weekly fare cap, and launched contactless payments, allowing bus, train and ferry passengers to 'tag on and off' with debit/credit cards, Apple Pay, Google Pay and Samsung Pay in addition to AT HOP cards. About 4000 payment validators were replaced for the launch which are expected to work with the Motu Move card.

Construction of stage 2 of the Eastern Busway, from Pakūranga to Botany, began in April 2023. The Matakana Link Road opened in June 2023 with the Pūhoi to Warkworth motorway, and AT took over the former State Highway 1 through Warkworth. The AT board approved a $28.1 million upgrade of Great North Road in Grey Lynn in June 2023, scaled back from a 2015 design; main works ran from January 2025 into 2026.

=== Restructuring ===
On 3 December 2024, the Transport Minister, Simeon Brown and Mayor of Auckland, Wayne Brown announced an overhaul of AT's mandate and functions. Key changes included moving various planning powers to council and repositioning the agency as a transport project and services delivery agency. Auckland Council would be given AT's former road-controlling authority powers with responsibility for regional land and public transport planning. Auckland's local boards would also be given decision-making powers over certain transport policies such as parking, speed limits, cycleways and pedestrian crossings.

On 5 September 2025, Transport Minister, Chris Bishop, Auckland Minister, Simeon Brown, and Mayor of Auckland, Wayne Brown confirmed that the New Zealand Government would introduce legislation reallocating policy, planning and road delivery and management powers from AT to Auckland Council. Under the new legislation, AT would be responsible for delivering public transport, infrastructure services and other specific functions determined by the council. Some council and local board elected representatives expressed concerns about how transport policy and planning work could be done by them.

The Local Government (Auckland Council) (Transport Governance) Amendment Act 2026 came into force on 7 May 2026. The act mandates changes to the region's transport framework, including the creation of the Auckland Regional Transport Committee (ARTC), the transfer of most local roading functions to Auckland Council, and the reforming of AT into a transport council-controlled organisation focused on delivering public transport services. The transition period ended on 1 October 2026.

The City Rail Link was officially opened at a formal ribbon-cutting ceremony on 11 September 2026 by New Zealand Prime Minister, Christoper Luxon and Auckland Mayor, Wayne Brown. The first day of public operation was on 13 September 2026. Transport minister, Chris Bishop was on board the first train. The first week of operation contributed to the highest ever Auckland rail patronage, with 528,007 boardings, beating the previous record 7-day record of 504,380 set in March 2019.

In its 2025 to 2026 financial year, before the restructure took effect, AT met or exceeded 20 out of 24 Statement of Intent targets and 40 out of 42 deliverables agreed with Auckland Council. It set a record for capital delivery, investing $1.4 billion to upgrade assets and provide new infrastructure, including its largest roading renewal programme of over 503 kilometres. In June 2026, 427 AT buses were low emission, the largest number in any Australasian city.

In 2026, also before the restructure took effect, a council local board satisfaction survey showed 82% of respondents were satisfied or very satisfied with the way AT engaged with them, double the figure recorded in 2023. In the 2026 annual Verian Public Sector Reputation Index, AT’s overall reputation score of 52 in 2025 increased to 64 in 2026, the biggest single year increase of any organisation in a decade of tracking.

== Operations and staff ==
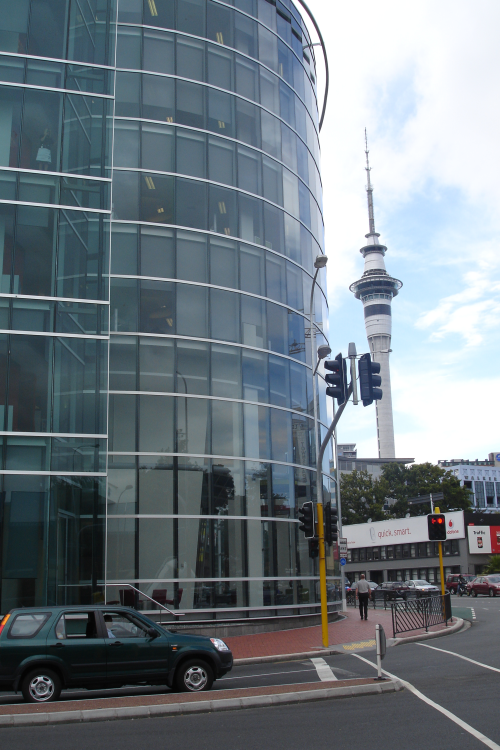
Auckland Transport's offices on Fanshawe Street, Auckland

AT is responsible for delivering public transport services and maintaining public transport infrastructure across the Auckland region. It creates timetables, designs routes, manages services contracts, and operates and manages public transport infrastructure (including stations and terminals). AT, as the operator of public transport assets, also plans and delivers minor capital works, including safety upgrades, amenity improvements, etc.

It is the largest of the council's organisations, with 1,999 staff in 2026, controlling half of all council rates.

Dr David Warburton was the inaugural chief executive of the organisation. His successor, Shane Ellison, joined the organisation in December 2017. Dean Kimpton was appointed chief executive in September 2024. Stacey van der Putten was appointed interim chief executive in May 2026 for 18 months.

In 2017, it created the new position of Transport Officer, in response to issues regarding fare-evasion and disorderly behavior on public transport. Transport Officers are empowered by law to remove passengers off trains and issue infringement notices of $150 to enforce fare payment.

== Board members ==
Directors are appointed by Auckland Council. The board ensures AT performs functions as directed by the council. The board of directors in October 2026 were:

- Andrew Ritchie (chair)
- Rob Clarke
- Adrienne Young-Cooper
- Lyndon Leabourn
- Malcolm Gibson

== Assets ==
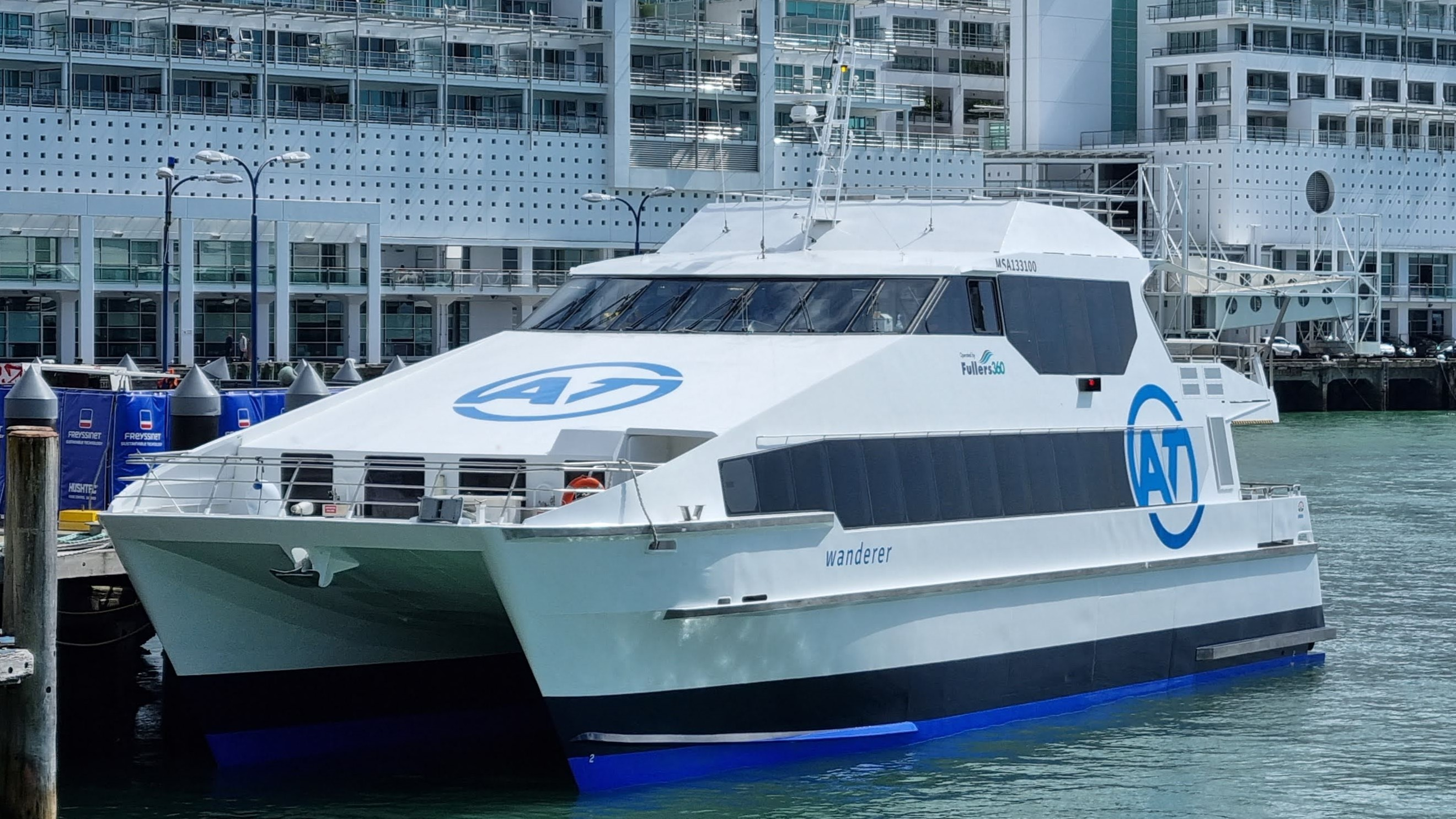
Wanderer, one of four upgraded ferries owned by AT since 2022

AT's assets totalled $37.3 billion in 2026, up from $19.1 billion in 2018.

AT owned or operated the following transport assets as of 2018:

- 72 electric train sets, consisting of AM class multiple units per set
- 41 railway station facilities (shelters, conveniences, WiFi) on Auckland's four railway lines, but not the platforms or tracks, which are owned by KiwiRail
- 1,350 buses across its metropolitan network.
- 16 dedicated bus stations, including six on the Northern Busway
- 21 ferry facilities
- 7,452 km of arterial and local roads (excluding state highways in the Auckland region, which are owned and maintained by NZ Transport Agency)

Also the following:

- 6,859 km of footpaths, which grew to 7,287 km by 2016
- 985 bridges and major culverts
- 99,912 street lights
- 127,666 road signs
- 1,554 bus shelters
- 14 multi-storey car park buildings
- 933 on-street pay-and-display machines
- 270 AIFS integrated ticketing devices

In 2022, AT purchased:

- 4 diesel commuter ferries that it upgraded

In 2025, AT launched:

- 1 electric commuter ferry with another 1 currently under construction along with 2 hybrid-electric ferries

In 2026, AT and KiwiRail took ownership of the completed City Rail Link infrastructure, including:

- 3 railway stations
- 1 pair of underground tunnels

In 2026, AT added:

- 23 train sets to increase its fleet to 95

== See also ==
- Public transport in Auckland
- AT Metro
- AT HOP card
