= Infratil =

New Zealand investment company

Infratil Limited
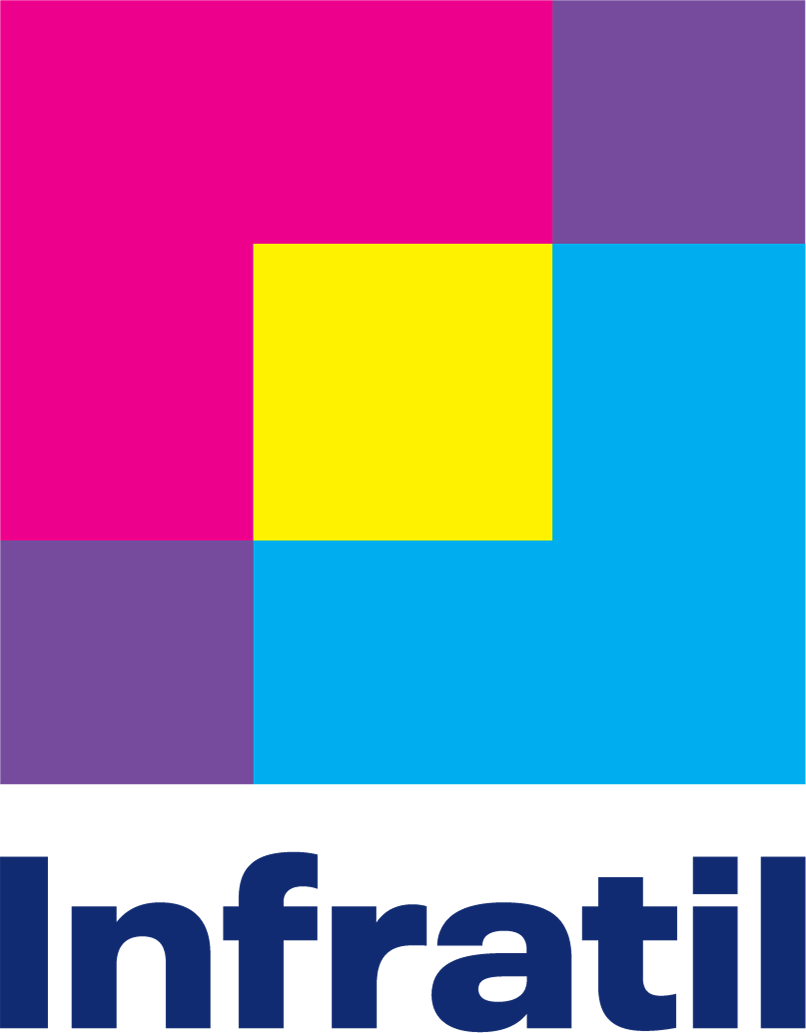
- Type: Public
- Traded as: NZX: IFT; S&P/NZX 50 component
- Industry: Renewable energy Airports; Digital infrastructure Healthcare
- Founded: 1994; 32 years ago
- Headquarters: Wellington, New Zealand
- Key people: Jason Boyes, CEO; Alison Gerry, Chair; Andrew Carroll, CFO; Mark Flesher, Investor Relations
- Website: infratil.com

Infratil Limited is a New Zealand–based infrastructure investment company. It owns assets in renewable energy, digital infrastructure, airports, and healthcare, with operations in New Zealand, Australia, Asia, the US and Europe. Infratil was founded by the late Lloyd Morrison, a Wellington-based merchant banker. Morrison's company, Morrison & Co is responsible for Infratil's management and administration.

== History ==
Infratil was one of the world's first listed infrastructure funds when it was established and listed on the New Zealand Exchange in 1994. Its first investment was a minority stake in Trustpower. It expanded into airport ownership in 1998 when it bought a 66% shareholding in Wellington Airport. More recently it has invested in the digital infrastructure and healthcare sectors. Infratil was named Amazon Web Services Company of the Year at the Deloitte Top 200 Awards for 2021. Infratil was also recognised in the IJInvestor awards with APAC Fund Performance of the year. At the 2024 INFINZ Awards Infratil was named Best Investor Relations and won the NZ Equity Market Transaction of the Year for its NZ$750 million placement and NZ$185 million upsized retail offer. In July 2025 Infratil was added to the S&P/ASX 200 Index.

Over the 10 year period from 1 April 2016 to 31 March 2026, Infratil delivered an average after tax return of 17.3%.

== Investments ==
The following companies are either wholly or partially owned by Infratil.

=== Renewables ===
- Longroad Energy is a Boston-headquartered renewable energy developer focused on the development, ownership, and operation and asset management of wind and solar energy projects throughout the U.S. Longroad Energy was founded in 2016, and is the reformulated team of First Wind, one of the most successful independent renewable energy development teams in the U.S. Since its establishment in 2016 Longroad Energy has developed and acquired 3.2GW of wind and solar projects, of which it still retains 2.4GW. Longroad currently has a 28GW development pipeline composed of wind, solar, solar and storage, and standalone storage assets across 13 states. Infratil owns 42.0% of the business.
- Galileo Energy is a pan-European, multi-technology, renewable energy developer, owner and operator headquartered in Zurich, Switzerland. Galileo has 16.1GW of dedicated projects across 10 markets at 31 March 2026. Infratil owns 38% of Galileo.
- Gurin Energy is a Singapore-headquartered renewable energy developer focused on the development, ownership, and operation of wind and solar energy projects, as well as storage, throughout Asia. Infratil owns 95% of Gurin Energy.
- Infratil owns 9.1% of Contact Energy, a Wellington-headquartered energy company. It is one of New Zealand's largest energy generators and retailers, with over 600,000 customer connections across electricity, gas, broadband and mobile plans. It operates power stations nationwide, using geothermal, hydro and thermal energy to generate electricity.
- Mint Renewables is an Australian based renewable energy developer focused on the development, ownership, and operation of wind and solar energy projects, as well as storage across Australia. Infratil owns 73% of Mint Renewables.

==== Former ====
- Manawa Energy was New Zealand's fifth largest electricity generator, generating approximately 9% of New Zealand's total hydro capacity. It owned 26 hydro power schemes with a total installed capacity of 510MW. Infratil sold its 50.76% share of Manawa Energy to Contact Energy under a Scheme of Arrangement announced on 11 September 2024.
- Tilt Renewables. In 2021 Infratil contracted to sell and subsequently completed the sale of its 65.15% stake in Tilt Renewables for $2,002 million.
- Z Energy. On 29 March 2010 a consortium owned 50% by Infratil and 50% by the Guardians of New Zealand Superannuation executed a sale and purchase agreement for the acquisition of Shell New Zealand's distribution and retail businesses and 17.1% interest in the New Zealand Refining Company. The agreement was completed on 1 April 2010. Initially named Greenstone Energy, it began to re-brand the service stations as Z in May 2011. Chief executive Mike Bennetts said that the cost of using the Shell brand, believed to be about NZ$10 million a year, was a factor in the decision. Infratil sold the remaining 20% stake in Z Energy in September 2015.
- Energy Developments Limited. A holding in Energy Developments Limited was sold into the takeover offer by Greenspark Power Holding Ltd for A$139.9 million in January 2010.

=== Healthcare ===
- Qscan is one of Australia's largest radiology providers, operating over 70 clinics across Australia. Qscan provides diagnostic imaging services such as x-rays, ultrasound, CT scans and MRI scans. Infratil owns 59.5% of Qscan.
- RHCNZ Medical Imaging Group. Consisting of Pacific Radiology, Auckland Radiology, and Bay Radiology, the RHCNZ Medical Imaging Group is New Zealand's largest diagnostic imaging provider. The combined group operates 70 clinics nationwide, with 31 clinics in the South Island and 39 in the North Island. Infratil owns 57% of RHCNZ Medical Imaging Group.
- Anytime Radiology is a dedicated teleradiology organisation established to strengthen the delivery, reliability, and performance of urgent after-hours and remote reporting services. It currently services 57 acute hospitals in Australasia through a network of teleradiologists around the globe, with offices in London, Sydney, Auckland and Christchurch. Infratil owns ~60% of Anytime Radiology.

==== Former ====
- RetireAustralia. In December 2014 Infratil and its partner, the New Zealand Superannuation Fund, each acquired 50% of RetireAustralia, a retirement operator with headquarters in Brisbane, Australia and over 4,000 independent living units and apartments across 29 villages in NSW, South Australia and Queensland. In August 2025 Infratil and the New Zealand Superannuation Fund entered into a binding agreement to sell their 100% interest in RetireAustralia to Invesco Real Estate.
- Metlifecare On 25 October 2013 Infratil advised the NZX it was to acquire a 19.9% in Metlifecare New Zealand's second largest village and aged care operator. The agreement was completed on 28 November 2013. On 7 April 2017 Infratil sold its 19.91% holding via a block trade on the NZX.

=== Airports ===
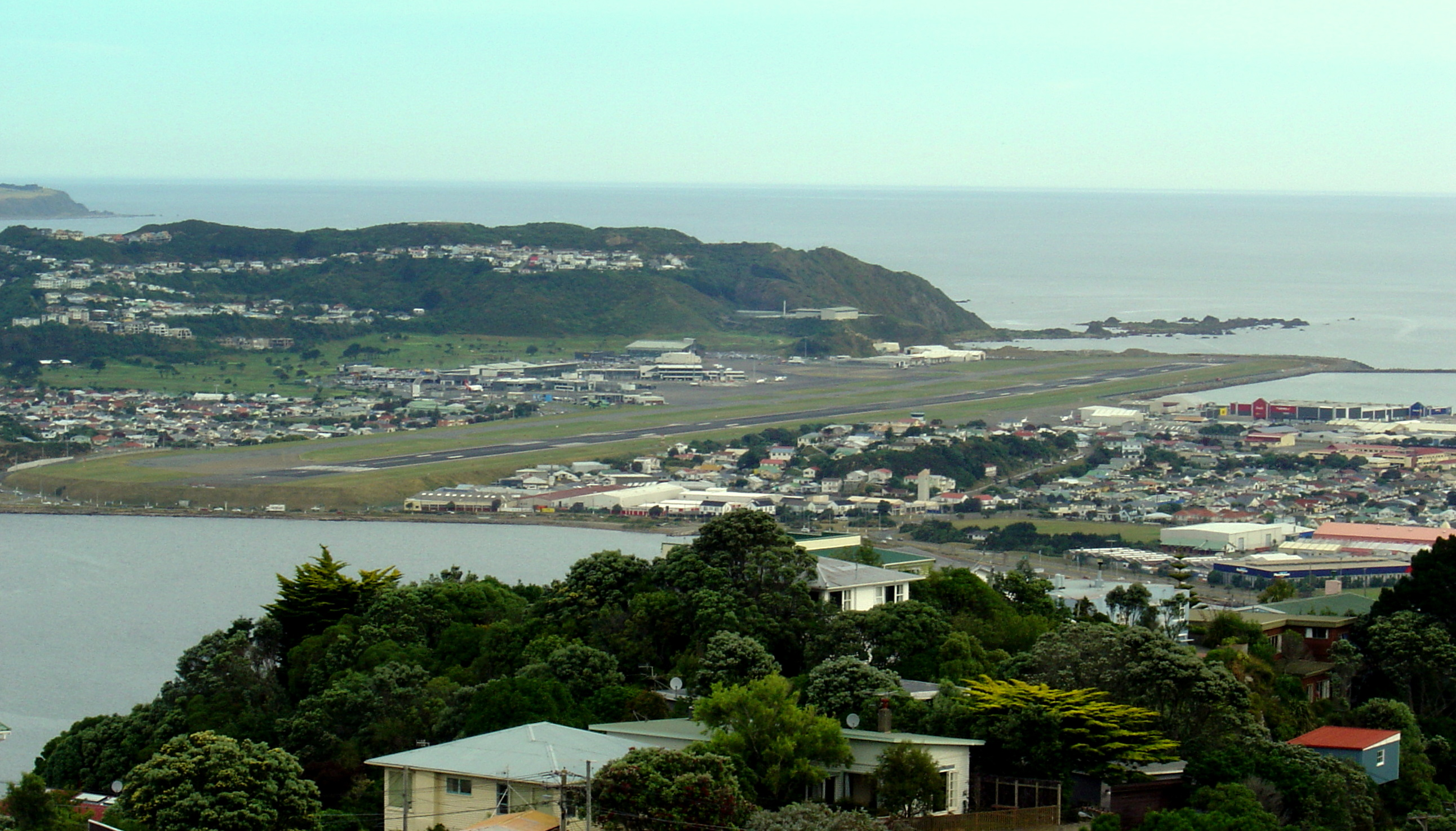
Wellington Airport from Mt Victoria

==== Current ====
- Wellington International Airport – 66% ownership through wholly owned subsidiary NZ Airports who purchased the stake in 1998, with Wellington City Council retaining the remaining 34%

==== Former ====
- Glasgow Prestwick Airport (sold to the Scottish government in November 2013)
- Manston Airport (sold to Ann Gloag in November 2013)
- Lübeck Airport Infratil exercised its put option in respect of its 90% shareholding and ownership has transferred to the City of Lübeck on 30 October 2009
- NZ Bus – 100% ownership, purchased in 2005 from Stagecoach. As of 24 December 2018, Infratil is selling NZ Bus to Australian equity firm Next Capital, subject to a consenting process that completed in June 2019.
- Snapper Services Limited – 100% ownership through Infratil subsidiary Swift Transportation.

=== Digital infrastructure ===
- CDC Data Centres (CDC) is headquartered in Canberra, Australia. CDC is the largest privately owned and operated data centre business across Australia and New Zealand. It currently has 20 data centres across 8 campuses. Infratil owns 49.7% of CDC.
- One NZ is one of New Zealand's leading digital services and connectivity companies providing more than 3 million connections to consumer and business companies. Infratil owns 99.8% of One NZ. On 7 June 2023, it announced its plan to buy most of the remaining shares from Canadian partner Brookfield Asset Management, bringing its total ownership of the company to 99.8%.
- Kao Data. Based in London, Kao Data develops and operates colocation data centres. Kao Data's data centres are designed to meet the computing needs of Hyperscale, Enterprise, High Performance Computing and Artificial Intelligence customers. Infratil owns 55% of Kao Data.
- Clearvision is focused on investing in companies in IoT, Big Data, and Security Technology.

==== Former ====
- Fortysouth is New Zealand's largest independent tower company. With over 1,400 wholly owned towers covering 98% of New Zealand's population, it is a strategic partner to mobile network operators, fixed wireless providers and critical communications operators.
