= Hotchin =

Hotchin is a surname. Notable people with the surname include:

- Claude Hotchin (1898–1977), Australian businessman and art dealer, patron and benefactor
- Mark Hotchin (born 1958), New Zealand property developer and financier
- Mortimer Hotchin (1889–1958), Australian cricketer
