= Book signing =

Affixing of a signature to a book by its author

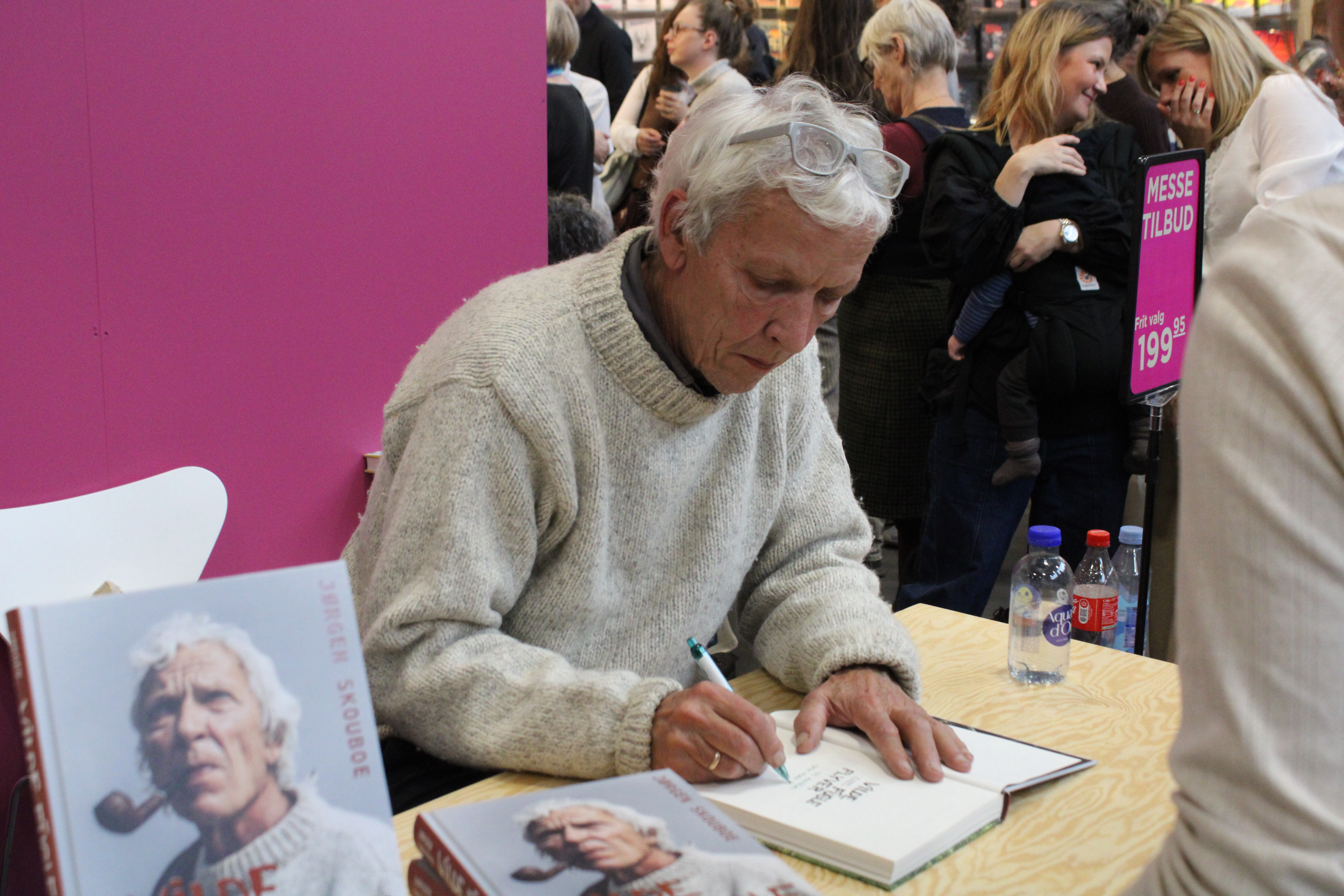
Danish media personality Jørgen Skouboe signing one of his books at Bella Center in Copenhagen, 2025

Book signing is the affixing of a signature to the title page or flyleaf of a book by its author. Book signings are events, usually at a bookstore or library, where an author sits and signs books for a period.

== Book signing ==
Book signing is popular because an author's signature increases the value of books for collectors. The author may add a short message to the reader, called a dedication, to each book, which may be personalized with the recipient's name upon request. A simple author's signature without a dedication is typically more valuable to collectors (exceptions include inscriptions to persons of note, e.g., from Hemingway to Fitzgerald, or to persons of significance in the author's life).

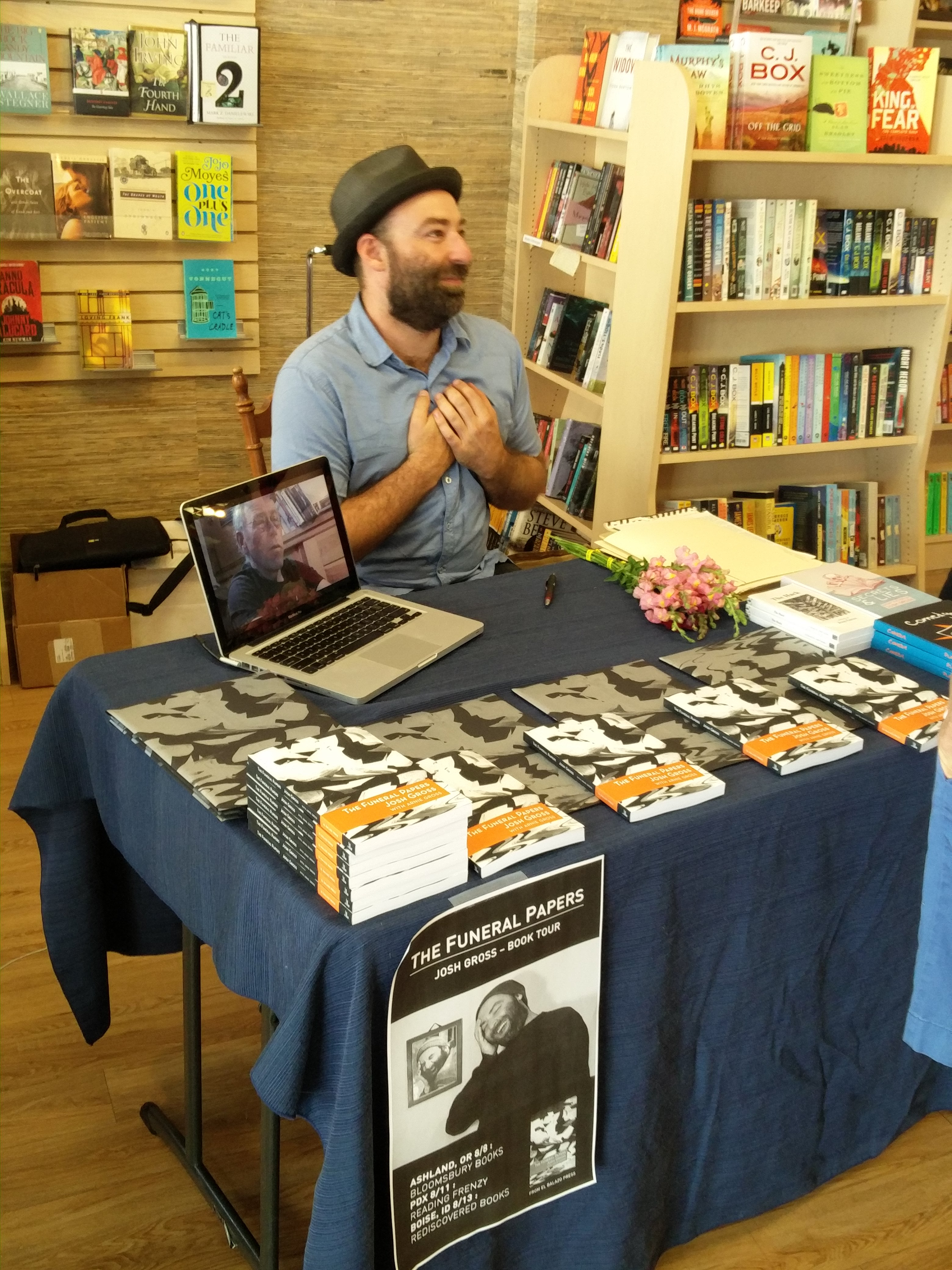
Josh Gross at Rediscovered Bookshop in Boise, Idaho, at the booksigning of his memoir The Funeral Papers in August 2016

Sometimes an author will sign additional copies for future sale. An additional advantage to authors for doing this is that once a book has been signed, it cannot be returned to the publisher for a refund.

Many authors today spend a great deal of time signing their books, and sign many thousands of copies. For example, John Green signed all 150,000 copies of the first printing of his 2012 novel The Fault in Our Stars.

The growing popularity of ebooks and ereading devices has inspired the development of software — such as Authorgraph (formerly known as Kindlegraph and renamed to reflect its expansion to include all ereading platforms), and Autography (for iOS devices) - that allows authors to digitally personalize ebooks, by including autographs, dedications, and photographs, and to provide such personalization remotely as well as at in-person book signings. Such software benefits authors, "who are not obliged to go on long distance promotional tours in order to autograph e-books for their fans", as well as those readers who are unwilling or unable to brave crowds and longs lines at onsite book signings. Before such applications were introduced, efforts to bridge the digital divide for those who read ebooks included having authors sign the backs of their fan's ereading devices or sign ebooks via direct stylus input (e.g., on a Sony Reader Touch or Palm eReader).

== Book signings ==
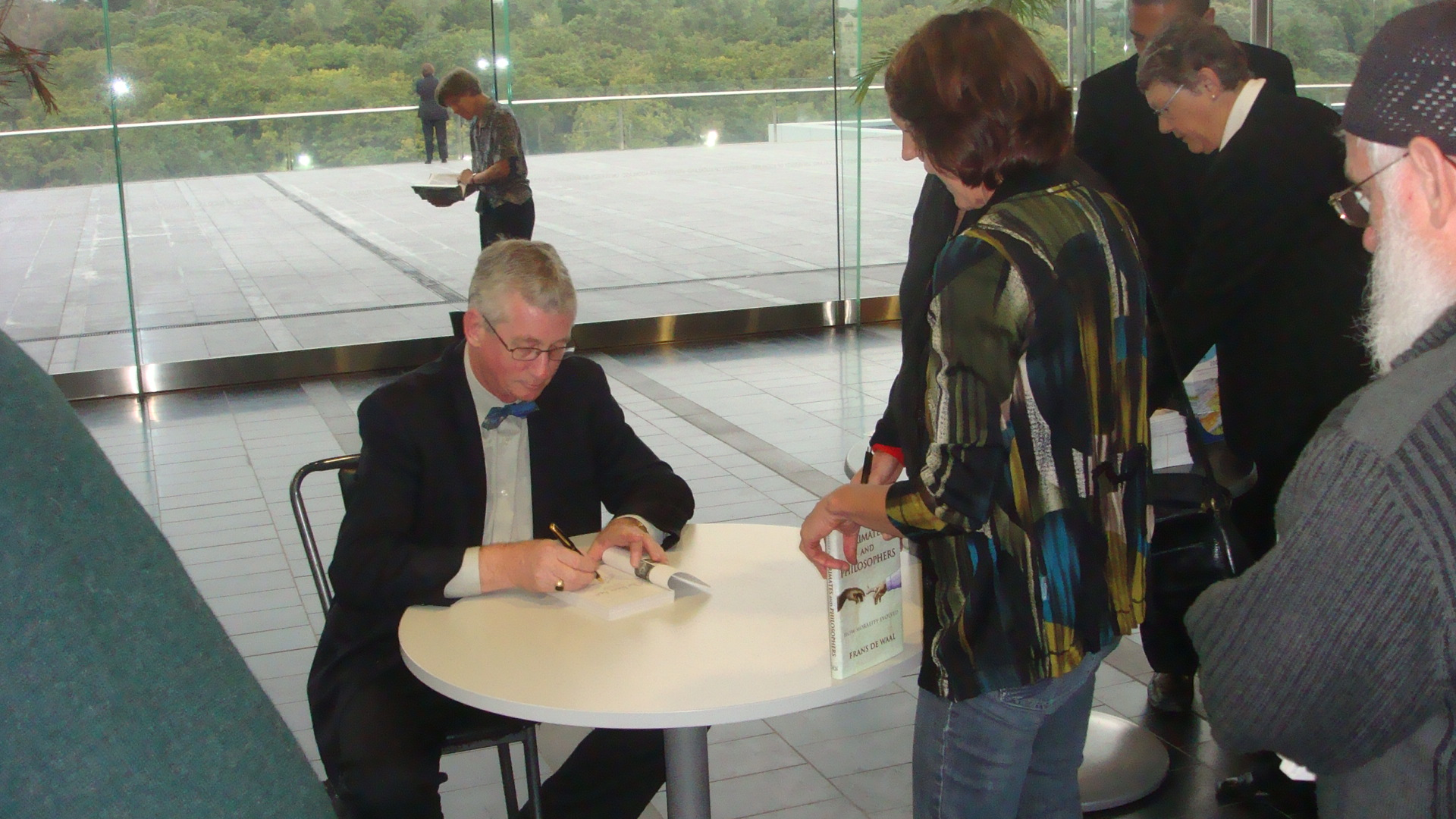
Frans de Waal signing one of his books at the University of Auckland's Owen G. Glenn Building

Book signings provide more than just a chance to obtain signatures. Authors and bookstores are benefited by the fact that many copies of the book being promoted are sold at these events. Signings also increase public goodwill and allow authors to connect with their fans. For fans, signings provide a chance to see and meet a favorite author and ask them questions.

The development of social media platforms allows modern day authors to conduct virtual book signings. For example, The GoodReader and Autography jointly hosted an ebook signing with author HP Mallory, during which Mallory greeted fans via Spreecast, a social connectivity platform that allows users to have up to four guests on video chat at one time, to conduct Q&A sessions with even more participants, and to maintain a channel on the site, thereby recording and storing the Spreecast and assigning the recordings a URL for sharing at other outlets.

Many authors use the book signing platform LiveSigning to host large-scale, streaming video book signings with their fans. Book signings on LiveSigning typically consist of the author signing books, answering questions from fans, and making phone calls to some fans. After the event, the signed books are mailed to everyone who purchased a signed copy.

== See also ==
- Autograph
- Book tour
