= South Canterbury Finance =

Defunct New Zealand finance company

South Canterbury Finance was New Zealand's largest locally owned finance company when it collapsed in August 2010, triggering a $1.6 billion bail-out of investors deposits by the New Zealand Government; almost $1 billion was recovered by receivers.

== History ==
In 1926, South Canterbury Finance Ltd started as a small-time lender to local businesses and households in the south Canterbury town of Timaru. It was then named South Canterbury Loan and Finance and it specialised in small personal loans. Allan Hubbard bought South Canterbury Finance in either the 1950s or in 1960. Lee says that Hubbard and Hugo Fanning established South Canterbury Acceptances and South Canterbury Credit Corp by 1960. They acquired South Canterbury Finance (SCF) by 1963 from a group of businessmen including a member of the Todd family. In 1964 Hubbard bought Fanning out, becoming the sole owner. The "originally modest" company began to achieve "real size" after buying Canterbury Finance from Humphrey Rolleston in 1986, in return for a 23% holding in Southbury Group, the owner of SCF and Hubbard’s other assets. Rolleston and Hubbard established a series of regional finance companies. Rolleston left SCF in 2004.

By 1992, South Canterbury Finance had become New Zealand's tenth largest finance company, and in 1992 it was the seventh largest. Hubbard was considered the driving force behind the company's growth as it ultimately became the largest financial institution in the South Island. By the late 2000s, South Canterbury Finance had 35,000 investors and its assets were considered to be worth almost $NZ2 billion. South Canterbury Finance owned 13 companies including fruit packaging and warehousing company Scales Corporation, helicopter and tourism business Helicopters NZ, and a third shareholding in Dairy Holdings Limited, New Zealand's largest dairy farming group.

In November 2008, SCF was accepted into the New Zealand Deposit Guarantee Scheme.

In June 2010, Allan Hubbard stood down as Chairman of South Canterbury Finance and was replaced by Bill Baylis.

== Lending ==
Despite its reputation as a South Island rural lender, South Canterbury Finance had made loans to property development throughout New Zealand, Australia and Fiji. At 30 June 2009, property loans were $414.2 million. Real estate lending represented 207 loans with an average net loan value of $1.15 million. Further, 37 per cent of lending was secured by a second or lower ranking mortgages. There were ten property loans greater than $10 million. For some lending, the interest was capitalised into the loan debt, so borrowers did not have to immediately fund interest payments. One example of a bad property investment was Oakridge Resort, the largest resort in Wānaka. In September 2009 Oakridge went into receivership, after a default on loan payments for a collapsed a 48-villa 25-hectare development. SCF was owed millions of dollars.

As of December 2009, SCF had $1.55 billion of deposits and debentures which were guaranteed under the government's Crown Retail Deposit Guarantee Scheme until October 2010. Rating agency Standard and Poor's stated that SCF had "urgent problems to tackle" and it moved SCF from "negative creditwatch" to a BBplus credit rating. South Canterbury Finance appointed corporate recovery specialist Sandy Maier as chief executive with a brief to restructure the finance company and its loan book.

== Collapse ==
In August 2009, South Canterbury Finance announced a net loss after tax of NZ$67.8 million for the year ended June 30, 2009 and reported that it had been in breach of lending covenants. Standard and Poor's downgraded SCF's credit rating from BBB− to BB+.

By May 2010, perpetual preference shares in SCF with a face value of $1, which were not covered by the government retail deposits guarantee scheme, were trading at 30 cents, reflecting a high perceived risk of default. On 31 August 2010, South Canterbury Finance asked its trustee to place it in receivership after negotiations over a recapitalisation deal failed. At that time South Canterbury Finance owed depositors as much as NZ$1.7 billion and owned assets valued at approximately NZ$1.9 billion, including subsidiary companies in property development, vehicle leasing and insurance. The Government immediately paid out to all 35,000 investors $NZ1.6 billion under the Retail Deposit Guarantee Scheme.

Alan Hubbard was reported as blaming the Government and the other South Canterbury Finance directors for the receivership: as the directors had sidelined him and the Government had placed him in statutory management. Former Chief Executive Sandy Maier stated that SCF's collapse was caused by excessive debt, poor risk management, unnecessary complexity, poor governance and a "too big to fail" attitude. Maier said the 2008 financial crisis accentuated some of these problems, but had not caused South Canterbury Finance’s collapse.

== Serious Fraud Office charges ==
On 7 December 2011, the Serious Fraud Office laid 21 charges against five individuals in respect of South Canterbury Finance. The charges relate to a variety of allegedly fraudulent transactions which have a total estimated value of approximately $1.7 billion. This includes an estimated $1.58 billion from the Crown Retail Deposits Guarantee Scheme. The charges include entering the Crown Guarantee Scheme by deception, omitting to disclose a related party loan of $64.185m from SCF to Southbury Group and Woolpak Holdings, failing to disclose related party loans of $19.1m from SCF to Shark Wholesalers, and breaching the crown guarantee scheme by lending $39m to Quadrant Holding Limited. The five accused are; former South Canterbury Finance chief executive Lachie McLeod, former South Canterbury Finance directors Edward Oral Sullivan (a lawyer with Raymond Sullivan McGlashan) and Robert Alexander White, former chief financial officer of South Canterbury Finance, Graeme Brown, and Timaru chartered accountant Terry Hutton, formerly of Hubbard and Churcher. The alleged offences include theft by a person in a special relationship, obtaining by deception, false statements by a promoter of a company and false accounting. All five defendants deny the charges. Leading up to trial charges against Brown and Hutton were withdrawn.

After a trial lasting five months, on 14 October 2014 the Timaru High Court handed down verdicts on the three defendants who stood trial. Robert White and Lachie McLeod were found not guilty on all charges, while Edward Sullivan was found guilty on five charges he faced, and not guilty on four other charges.

== Aorangi Securities ==
On 20 June 2010, the New Zealand Government placed Allan Hubbard, his wife Jean Hubbard and his business Aorangi Securities and seven charitable trusts into statutory management, with Trevor Thornton and Richard Simpson of Grant Thornton appointed as statutory managers. This decision was based on recommendations from the Securities Commission of New Zealand after a complaint from an investor. Allan Hubbard established Aorangi Securities Limited in 1974. The directors were Allan and Margaret Hubbard and the share capital was owned by another Hubbard-owned company, Forresters Nominee Company Limited. Aorangi had operated as a finance company, having raised $98 million from 407 investors living in Otago and Canterbury and making loans of approximately $134 million to borrowers. The review of the Securities Commission concluded that many of the loans were inadequately documented, appeared to be unsecured and contrary to instructions from investors. The Serious Fraud Office initiated an investigation for fraud.

== Hubbard Funds Management ==
In July 2010, Grant Thornton reported that Allan Hubbard also controlled an additional business entity that they had not been aware of when appointed. This was Hubbard Funds Management, an investment management business estimated to be worth $70 million. It had inadequate accounting records consisting of a hand written cashbook and journals maintained by Mr Hubbard.

In September 2010, two further companies related to Hubbard Funds Management, Hubbard Churcher Trust Management Ltd and Forresters Nominee Company Ltd, were also placed under statutory management.

In April 2012, Grant Thornton paid out an interim distribution of $9 million (or 13.4c in the dollar) to investors in Hubbard Management Funds.

In May 2012, Grant Thornton reported that investors in Hubbard Management Funds were owed $82 million, and the fund was valued at $44.8m. Grant Thornton asked the High Court to decide how to distribute the fund given the lack of a prospectus and given that the 'largely fictional' investor statements had not been reconciled to investment assets for three years.

== Subsequent events ==
In 2017 Kapiti sharebroker Chris Lee investigated the possibility of legal claims by investors, to be funded by an Australian litigation funding company, but these have not eventuated.

In 2017 the High Court ruled that former investors would receive more than $9.4 million from the proceeds of Alan Hubbard's estate.

In 2019 Kapiti sharebroker Chris Lee wrote a book The Billion Dollar Bonfire criticising the sale of SCF assets by the receivers as a "fire sale" and asking why overseas offers were not taken up.

== See also ==
- Finance company collapses, 2006-12 (New Zealand)
- Crown Retail Deposit Guarantee Scheme
