= 2006–2012 New Zealand finance company collapses =

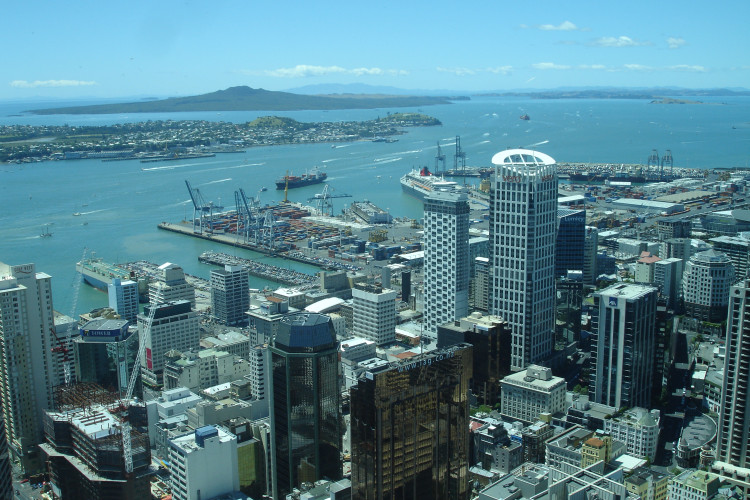
Auckland city is home to the head offices of most of New Zealand's finance industry.

Between May 2006 and the end of 2012 there were 67 finance company collapses in New Zealand, including companies entering into liquidation, receivership or moratoria. An inquiry by the New Zealand Parliament estimated losses at over $3 billion that affected between 150,000 and 200,000 depositors. The most high-profile collapses were South Canterbury Finance, Hanover Finance and Bridgecorp Holdings. The collapse radically reduced the size and importance of the non-bank finance sector in New Zealand. According to the Reserve Bank, at the height of financial expansion prior to the 2008 financial crisis, non-bank lenders had assets of about $25 billion and made up 8% of lending by financial institutions. By late 2013 the size of the finance sector was half its previous size and accounted for only 3 percent of institutional lending. In the years following the beginning of the collapses, sweeping legislative and regulatory changes were made, aimed at improving oversight and regulation of the finance industry.

== Background and causes ==
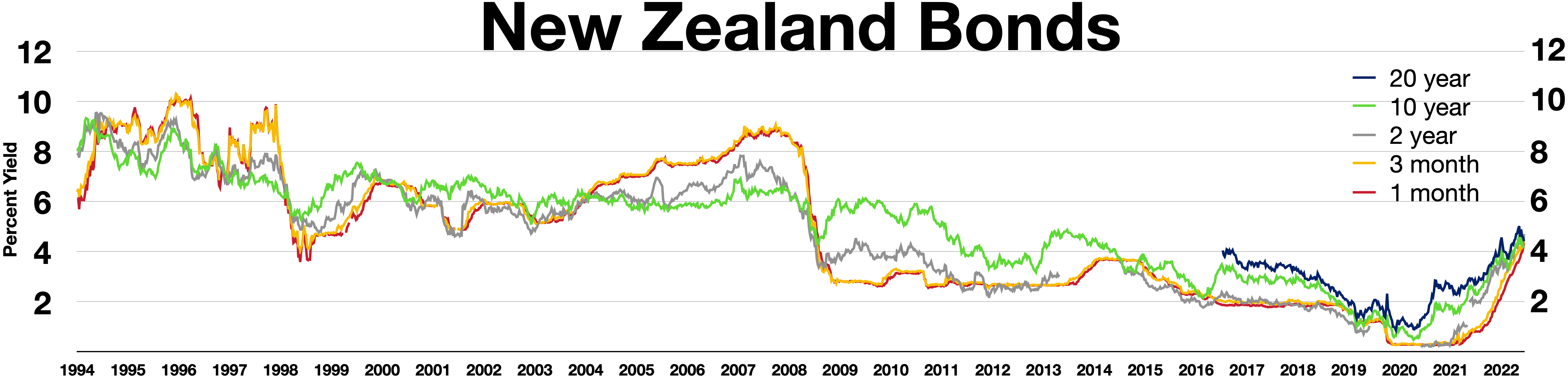
New Zealand bonds Inverted yield curve in 1994-1998 and 2004-2008 20 year 10 year 2 year 3 month 1 month

New Zealand's economy became increasingly dominated by finance capitalism in the decades before the Great Recession. Finance companies grew rapidly in the years leading up to the 2008 financial crisis as property developers used finance firms to "fund requirements over and above their first mortgage from a major bank." According to a report by the Commerce Select Committee, "between December 2004 and June 2007 the deposits invested by households in finance companies rose from $5.1 billion to $7.1 billion, an increase of 39 percent." This rapid rise meant the finance industry was growing at a faster rate than the banking sector, mainly funded by retail investors ("mum and dad investors") seeking higher-yielding investments than banks could offer.

A Parliamentary inquiry into finance company failures identified four causes of the company collapses:

- Poor governance and management;
- Criminal misconduct;
- Deficiencies in disclosure, advice, and investors’ understanding;
- Inadequate supervision.

A 2014 mathematical survey of 31 New Zealand finance company failures in the period 2006 to 2009 by a group of academics found that "failed finance companies have lower capital adequacy, inferior asset quality, more loans falling due, higher earnings and lower cash flows. Furthermore, failed companies have a longer audit lag and some trustees appear to have a greater percentage of failed firms than others."

=== Directors' conduct and culture ===
Directors' conduct in the years leading up to the collapses was often incompetent and at times fraudulent. In some cases, such as Bridgecorp, the personal greed of directors was deemed to be the main cause of the fraud, "[Bridgecorp director Rod] Petricevic was acting without any concern for ethical principles. He was using company resources to fund his personal interests and was determined to get his way whether it was ethical or not. [...] Bridgecorp ultimately became an outworking of Petricevic's lack of ethical values."

Tony Molloy, QC said in the wake of the company collapses, "Meaningful consideration of investor protection legislation is impossible without first identifying the culture of the New Zealand market that has treated investors as prey, rather than as fellow citizens engaged in an enterprise from which all might profit to the benefit of the nation as a whole."

Molloy, in a stinging tirade, wrote to the Commerce Select Committee during its inquiry into finance company collapses, stating:

The recent destruction of wealth by the finance company and investment product industry was the inevitable consequence of a failure to read the signs that were there for anyone to see: at least three decades of unreadiness, unwillingness, and inability, on the part of regulators, enforcers, courts, lawyers, and accountants, to fulfil their respective functions with integrity.

Law Professor Julie Cassidy believed that part of the cause of this was that policing of directors' duties was, "governed by a regime that is weak in terms of both standards of conduct and review and penalties. Coupled with the lack of power in the regulatory body [...] to pursue directors for even egregious breaches, the reality is that the New Zealand regime has failed to punish, much less prevent, serious breaches of directors' duties."

=== Related party transactions ===
Sloppy oversight of related party transactions was also a key cause as one study noted: "The interrelated characteristics of related party transactions in failed finance companies include: Excessive lending to related parties without satisfactory securities; Directors’ control over finance companies and their related parties; Deliberate non-disclosure of significant lending to related parties; and Breach of statutory requirements and agreements." The study noted that gaps between the disclosed and undisclosed related party transactions were often significant:

Capital + Merchant Finance's recorded related party loans were $41.58 million, whereas its unrecorded related party loans were $41.1 million. Of Rockforte's $4.8 million in outstanding loans, $2 million were undisclosed related party lending. Undisclosed related party transactions of more than $1 million were made to firms owned by Trevor Ludlow of National Finance 2000. Bridgecorp did not disclose related party lending to Barcroft which represented more than 30 per cent of Bridgecorp's total loan book.

=== Poor governance ===
In the area of governance, a major problem was that some of the trustees of debt security companies provided inadequate oversight of the companies they were supposed to be supervising. At least 25 failed finance firms used one of two trustee companies – Perpetual Trust and Covenant Trust; raising concerns the trusts "were slow to detect adverse financial issues".

== Crisis, effects and bailouts ==
The 2008 financial crisis had a flow on effect in the New Zealand economy causing a downturn in the real estate market and precipitating a credit crunch. These macro-economic factors and subsequent "run on the funds" sparked the collapse of most of the finance companies;

Credit began to tighten in the market and loan defaults became more common. This brought down the first 3 finance companies – National, Provincial and Western Bay – because of their lax credit- risk management (RBNZ, 2006). The collapsing housing market in New Zealand had the effect of reducing the value of many of the investments that finance companies were involved in, and the initial collapses and media attention spooked the "Mum and Dad‟ investors.

Reserve Bank Governor Alan Bollard would reflect that:

At the end of 2006 and in early 2007, we started to hear about property finance companies in trouble. Most were very small, and as individual failures they did not greatly concern us. But in the second half of 2007, bigger finance companies started to fall like flies. As each one entered into liquidation, receivership or moratorium, media speculation turned to the next. We saw angry scenes of elderly debenture holders haranguing hapless managers at meetings. The pattern seemed clear: poor governance, spider-web company structures, vulnerable business models, mismatched balance sheets, bad management and inadequate supervision by the trustee companies.

In the wake of the company failures there were numerous reports in the New Zealand news media of retirees who had lost their life savings. One example of this was Ken Mitchell, who lost $1.1 million of his life savings when Bridgecorp collapsed. Another example was cited by a judge in the sentencing of a Bridgecorp director, "The 79-year-old said he and his wife had invested their life savings with Bridgecorp. Their hopes for a comfortable retirement were gone and they were no longer able to provide any financial help to their children. They now had to rely on a modest pension. The effect of the failure had been devastating and this had been the most depressing period of their lives." During the 2010 sentencing of another company director the judge noted the "overwhelming sense of bitterness felt by investors"; "I acknowledge the presence of many investors here in court ... the letters that I have received range in consequences up to financial disaster, loss of homes, illness and effects on health and relationships." One investor, Carole Corner, had to sell her house after the company failed.

In response to the collapses, and worried about the fragility of the finance and banking sector, the New Zealand Government moved in to reassure investors in the finance sector. Between 2008 and 2011 the Government operated a deposit insurance scheme, the Crown Retail Deposit Guarantee Scheme. During its operation nine finance companies, including South Canterbury Finance, were bailed out after they had collapsed. This cost the government around $2 billion.

Bailouts under the Crown Retail Deposit Guarantee Scheme
| Company name | Entry date in scheme | Failure date | Amount paid out |
|---|---|---|---|
| Allied Nationwide Finance Limited | 19 November 2008 | 20 August 2010 | $131.0m |
| Equitable Mortgages Limited | 4 December 2008 | 26 November 2010 | $140.2m |
| Mascot Finance Limited | 12 January 2009 | 2 March 2009 | $70.0m |
| Mutual Finance Limited | 13 November 2008 | 14 July 2010 | $9.2m |
| Rockforte Finance Limited | 20 February 2009 | 10 May 2010 | $4.0m |
| South Canterbury Finance Limited | 19 November 2008 | 31 August 2010 | $1,580.3m |
| Strata Finance Limited | 19 November 2008 | 31 August 2010 | $0.5m |
| Viaduct Capital Limited | 13 November 2008 | 14 May 2010 | $7.6m |
| Vision Securities Limited | 5 December 2008 | 1 April 2010 | $30.0m |

== Investigations, prosecutions and convictions ==
As at 30 January 2015 the Serious Fraud Office (SFO) had prosecuted company officers such as directors and accountants involved in eleven finance companies, securing convictions against twenty people for a range of offences against the Crimes Act and Securities Act. As a result of convictions officers of finance companies were sentenced to a total of 707 months of prison. Examples of successful prosecutions include: three Nathans Finance directors were found guilty of making untrue statements in the company's prospectus, two received prison sentences of over two years, one received a sentence of home detention; two Capital + Merchant finance directors sentenced to seven and a half years and five years after being found guilty of charges of theft by a person in a special relationship; and convictions of five directors of Bridgecorp resulting in prison sentences of six and a half years for Rod Petricevic and Rob Roest.

The most serious case was that against South Canterbury Finance. The SFO director said that, "The value of the fraud alleged to have been committed exceeds anything in the history of white-collar crime in New Zealand". However, in the criminal case against three former officers of South Canterbury Finance the SFO achieved only five convictions as a result of eighteen charges prosecuted before the Timaru High Court. A central charge against the directors that they had obtained membership of the Crown Retail Deposit Guarantee Scheme through deception was not proved. Immediately after the failure to secure convictions, the SFO faced criticism that they had not called the former Treasury Secretary John Whitehead to give evidence.

Despite conducting what it described as, "by far the most extensive and challenging of the finance company investigations undertaken" into Hanover Finance, the SFO decided in April 2013 not to proceed with criminal charges against the directors involved.

David Ross, principal for Ross Asset Management, was sentenced to a minimum of five years and five months in prison for running, what a judge described as a Ponzi scheme.

== Civil actions and settlements ==
Alongside criminal prosecutions, the Financial Markets Authority (FMA) and the receivers of the failed finance firms often pursued civil actions to recoup investor losses. The receivers of Bridgecorp Finance settled claims alleging breach of directors' duties against three directors of the firm for $18.9 million in February 2014. In the same month a case against the directors of Lombard Finance, alleging breach of directors' duties, was settled for $10 million.

The liquidator of Capital + Merchant finance settled their civil claims against the auditor of the firm for $18.5 million in July 2014.

Civil action by the FMA and the receivers of Strategic Finance against the company's directors and auditors for breaches of the Securities Act, such as making false statements, were settled for $22 million in August 2014.

In an action taken by receivers of Belgrave Finance Justice Fogarty in the Auckland High Court awarded a judgment of $8.6 million against a former director of the company and a property developer associated with it for breach of fiduciary duties and dishonest assistance of breach of fiduciary duties respectively.

Civil action against the directors of sister companies Dominion Finance and North South Finance for their failure to perform their roles adequately was settled for $10.24 million in June 2015.

In July 2015 the FMA settled civil actions, alleging misleading and untrue statements in firm prospectuses and advertisements, against six men associated with the Hanover Finance group of companies out of court in exchange for the distribution of $18 million to investors in the failed finance firms.

== Reform ==
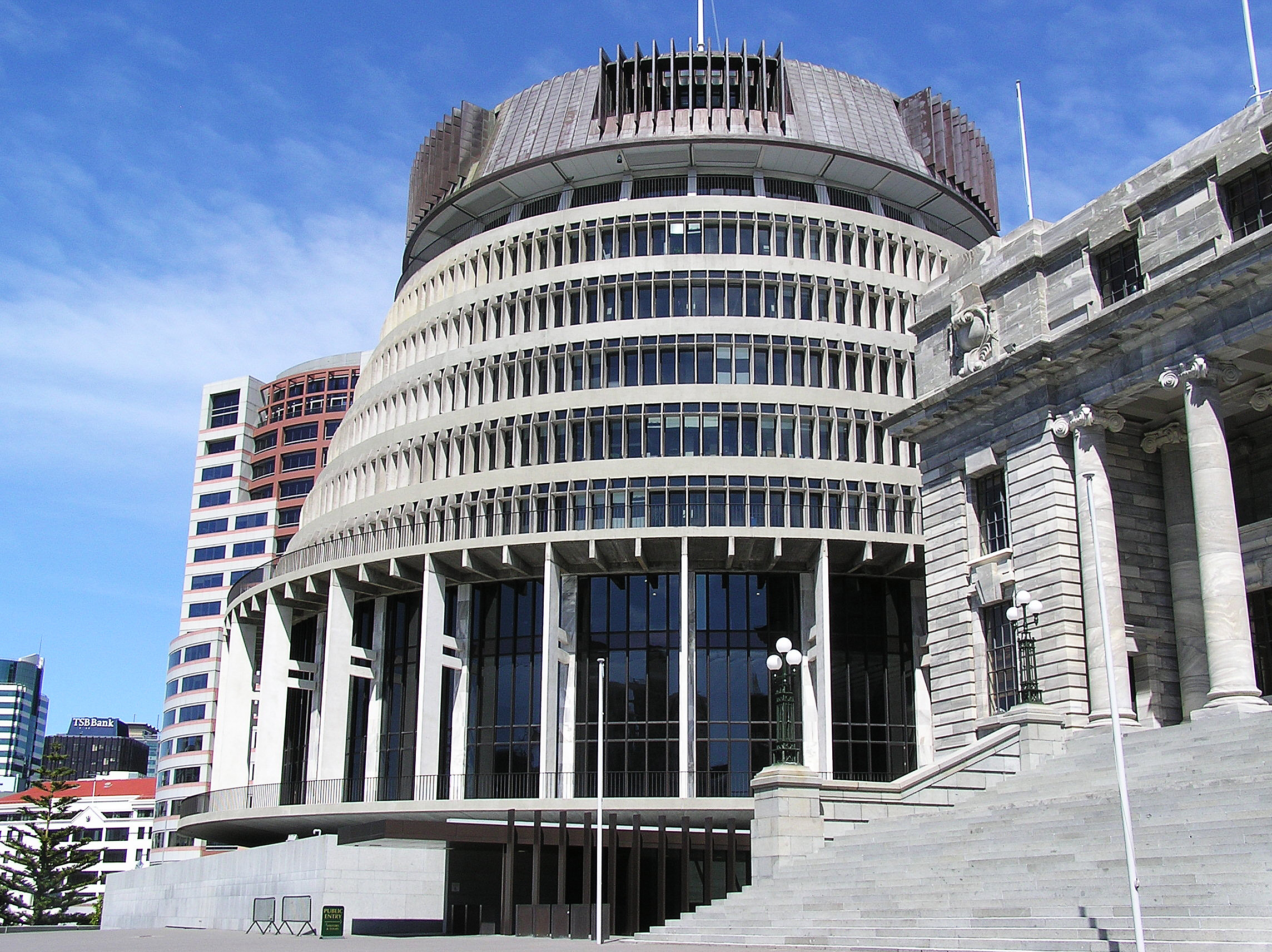
The Beehive, Executive Wing of New Zealand's Parliament buildings

In response to the collapses the New Zealand government carried out a wide range of law and regulatory reforms of the finance industry. Key legislative changes included:

- In the area of financial services, the Financial Advisers Act 2008 and Financial Service Providers (Registration and Dispute Resolution) Act 2008 were enacted, professionalising advisory services, including by requiring advisers to adhere to a code of conduct.
- The Financial Markets Authority Act 2011 replaced the Securities Commission with the Financial Markets Authority (FMA) and empowered the Authority to take legal action on behalf of investors against directors, trustees and auditors; to conduct market surveillance; prevent products being structured to avoid FMA oversight; and warning powers on low-ball unsolicited offers.
- The Kiwisaver Amendment Act 2011 imposed an improved regime of reporting by KiwiSaver providers and created statutory duties for managers and trustees of Kiwisaver providers. The legislation was partly a response to the revelations that the manager of Huljich Wealth Management had used his own money to top up investors funds to hide investment losses.
- The Securities Trustees and Statutory Supervisors Act 2011 created a new system for licensing of securities trustees and statutory supervisors by the FMA and requirements for trustees to report actual or potential breaches of trust documents to the FMA.
- The Securities Act 1978 was replaced by the Financial Markets Conduct Act 2013. One of the core changes was the replacement of requirements by issuers of financial products to provide a prospectus and investment statement with a requirement for a single product disclosure statement with penalties for misleading or deceptive statements. Green Party leader Dr Russel Norman criticised the law as it will make it harder to secure criminal convictions against finance company directors involved in activities similar to those that caused the collapses.
- The passage of the Non-bank Deposit Takers Act 2013 brought in powers for greater oversight and regulation of finance companies; requiring independent directors, minimum capital requirements and restrictions on the amount of related party transactions allowed.
- The Companies Amendment Act No 4 2014 created new criminal offences for: directors who exercise powers or perform duties in bad faith; directors who allow insolvent companies to incur debt.

== See also ==
- Crown Retail Deposit Guarantee Scheme
- Bridgecorp Holdings
- Mark Hotchin
- South Canterbury Finance
- Great Recession
