= Arlington Square, Bracknell =

Coordinates: 51.4156°N 0.7582°W

Arlington Square Business Park is a business park in Bracknell, England, owned and operated by Goodman Group.

The park houses a number of well-known companies, including Novell, Fujitsu and Ally Financial.
