= Mark Hotchin =

Mark Stephen Hotchin
- Born: 25 December 1958 (age 67)
- Occupation: Property developer
- Known for: Founding finance company Hanover Finance and its high profile demise in 2010
- Spouse: Amanda
- Children: 3

Mark Stephen Hotchin (born 25 December 1958) is a New Zealand former property developer and financier. He was a director of the failed Hanover Group which owned a number of finance companies including Hanover Finance, United Finance, Nationwide Finance and FAI Finance.

The Hanover Group also had interests in property and was responsible for developing Matarangi Beach Estates and golf course, and acquired completed lots at the Jacks Point property sub-division in Queenstown. The Group also had property and finance interests in Australia.

With Eric Watson he bought 30 per cent of Elders Finance in 1999 and in December that year bought it outright. Elders Finance became the core of what would become Hanover Finance. Two years on, their other finance and investment assets (Nationwide Finance, Leasing Solutions, Elders Home Loans and Hanover Securities) were rolled in to create Hanover Group with reported assets of $650m.

The flow on effects of the 2008 financial crisis and nervous reaction of investors lowered overall confidence in the market and saw over 50 finance companies in New Zealand fail by 2010. Hanover applied to the trustee for a repayment freeze or moratorium rather than a receivership. After the repayment freeze Hanover prepared a debt repayment plan, offering to repay investors over a 5-year period. As part of the plan, Hotchin and Watson pledged $96 million of assets. These assets fell in value as property prices declined.

Hotchin arranged for Allied Farmers to take over the failing business, but the losses overwhelmed the new owner and the business was put into liquidation in 2010. In December 2011 the Financial Markets Authority (FMA) announced that it proposed to file civil proceedings against Hotchin and the other directors and promoters of Hanover.

== Early life and business ==
Mark Hotchin was born in Auckland, and attended Roman Catholic schools, St Joseph's Primary School in Onehunga, Marcellin College and St Paul's College. His father owned a joinery factory, and was also involved with property development.

When Mark Hotchin left school he worked in his father's factory. His first business was a sports goods store, which got into financial trouble and was rescued by his father.

Hotchin first bought and subdivided a house for profit in 1982 when he was 23 years old. He then did an increasing number of such subdivisions. In the 1990s, he bought Regency Court in the Auckland suburb of Saint Heliers for $6 million, selling it later for $10 million. He bought the successful taxi company Corporate Cabs, expanded it and sold it in 1999 to former Skellerup Group boss Murray Bolton. He bought Matarangi Beach Estates in 1995.

== Finance companies ==
Hotchin's property development work depended on borrowing from finance companies and banks. Hotchin saw an opportunity to lend to developers like himself and bridge the gap between bank funding and equity funding. This coincided with a boom in the housing and construction market in NZ throughout the early part of the 2000s.

=== Hanover group ===
Hotchin and business partner Eric Watson bought Elders Finance in 1999. Elders, and a number of other finance companies, were brought together to create Hanover Group. With $650 million in assets, this was New Zealand's third largest finance company at the time. In 2007, Forbes listed Hotchin and Watson as the 33rd and 34th richest people in New Zealand and Australia.

Hotchin's interests ranged outside the traditional finance company model. In 2003 Hotchin through the Hanover Group bought a 10% stake in Tower, a large fund management and insurance business. Hanover wanted a better deal for investors and forced Tower and owners GPG to review the capital raising and underwrite deal they had agreed.

In 2007 Hanover Group made an after tax profit of $105m. Controversially Hanover Finance paid NZ$45.5 million in dividends to Hotchin and Watson in the year ending 30 June 2008. Much of these dividends were then reinvested back into the company to reduce related party transactions, which at the time were around 14% of the loan book.

As a result of the 2008 financial crisis, in July 2008, Hanover Finance and United Finance froze repayments of NZ$554 million owed to 36,500 investors. After a vote over 85% of investors agreed to a debt repayment plan for the return of their capital over a 5-year time scale, predicated on the recovery of the New Zealand property market. Hotchin and Watson pledged a property, benefits and cash package worth up to $96m to investors as part of the deal. By November 2009 accountancy firm PwC estimated that the package had fallen in value to between $36 million and $56 million, due to a fall in property prices. Over the first year of the debt repayment plan, six cents in the dollar was repaid to investors, however the property market had continued to worsen and it appeared the company was heading for receivership.

In 2009 Hanover was approached by Allied Farmers to buy the assets of Hanover Finance and United Finance, effectively held in limbo by the repayment plan. In December 2009 Hanover Group debenture holders, note holders and bond holders were given another opportunity to vote for receivership or for the new plan with Allied. 75% voted in favour of swapping their debentures, notes and bonds for shares in Allied Farmers Limited. This transaction resulted in Allied Farmers assuming the net asset position of the Hanover Group finance companies.

Allied Farmers put their finance company Allied Nationwide into receivership on 20 August 2010 and as at March 2011 shares in were worth only a fraction of what they were traded for.

In late December 2011, the Financial Markets Authority (FMA) announced that it proposed to file civil proceedings against the directors and promoters of Hanover Finance Limited and other companies relating to statements made in the December 2007 prospectuses and subsequent advertisements.

As a result of the FMA's announcement former Hanover Finance's chairman Greg Muir issued a media statement saying that "the FMA investigators were given a substantial amount of evidence demonstrating that the directors conducted themselves responsibly, with appropriate rigour, and made judgments they believed were in the best interests of the company and its investors on the information available to them at the time."

In December 2012, the remaining property assets of Hanover and United Finance (with a book value of $13.5 million) were transferred from Allied Farmers to Crown Asset Management, the entity set up to hold assets from failed finance companies backed by the Government's deposit guarantee.

== Dirty Politics controversy ==
Emails provided by Rawshark to Fairfax Media appear to show that Hotchin secretly paid right wing bloggers Cameron Slater and Cathy Odgers to write attack posts undermining the Serious Fraud Office, its chief executive Adam Feely, and the Financial Markets Authority, while they were investigating the collapse of Hanover Finance in 2011. Carrick Graham, his PR consultant at the time, and Nicky Hager claim Mr Graham's company, Facilitate Communications, paid Slater $6,555 a month. Slater obliged by writing a series of highly critical blogs about Feely in late 2011. Justice Minister Judith Collins was forced to resign and an investigation launched into her role after an email was released alleging that she was directly involved and "gunning" for Adam Feely.

== Personal life ==
Amongst the most controversial of his New Zealand assets was an unfinished house on the upmarket Paritai Drive, in the Auckland suburb of Ōrākei. This house has been the target of much of the public's ill-feeling towards Hotchin. In 2009, pizza company Hell Pizza set up a large billboard on a trailer outside the house to advertise pizza based on the seven deadly sins.

In 2011 Hotchin decided to sue the country's biggest newspaper, the New Zealand Herald, for aggravated and punitive damages.

Hotchin's New Zealand assets were frozen by the High Court, following an application by the Securities Commission. But a decision by the Court to have the order overturned has been ruled on but not made public.

Hotchin was co-owner with Eric Watson of the New Zealand Warriors but later sold his stake to Watson, who later, for a period, had Owen Glenn as co-owner, before selling his interest in 2018.

== See also ==
- Finance company collapses, 2006-12 (New Zealand)
