= Allan Hubbard (businessman) =

New Zealand businessman (1928–2011)

Allan Hubbard QSO
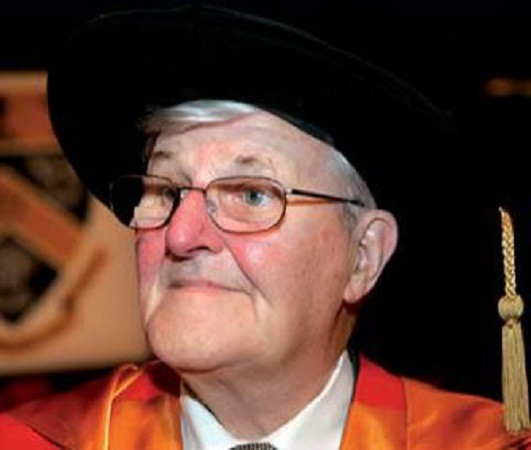
- Hubbard in 2006
- Born: Allan James Hubbard; 23 March 1928; Dunedin, New Zealand
- Died: 2 September 2011 (aged 83)
- Occupation: Businessman
- Known for: Setting up a major finance business South Canterbury Finance in the South Island of New Zealand and its eventual failure
- Partner: Margaret (Jean) Hubbard

Allan James Hubbard QSO (23 March 1928 – 2 September 2011) was a New Zealand businessman who lived in Timaru in the South Island of New Zealand, and was the founder of South Canterbury Finance, New Zealand's largest locally owned finance company. In 2006, the New Zealand Listener described Hubbard as the most powerful businessman in the South Island.

Hubbard was listed on the New Zealand Listener Power List from 2005 through to 2007 and he was listed on the Primary Sector Power list at number four in 2009.

Hubbard had significant interests in dairy farming, irrigation systems, finance and helicopters. He was one of three directors of Dairy Holdings Limited, which in 2007 owned 57 dairy units, and 10 grazing blocks in the South Island. In the 2006–07 season Dairy Holdings Limited milked 44,000 cows on 16,120 hectares and produced 14.3 million kg of milksolids.

Hubbard died as the result of an Oamaru car crash. After being stabilised at Oamaru Hospital, he died in a short helicopter ride while being transferred from the hospital to Dunedin Hospital on 2 September 2011. In February 2012, the Oamaru police charged a 40-year-old man with careless driving causing death and injury, and he was found guilty in August 2013.

== Early life ==
Hubbard was born in 1928 in Dunedin. His parents lived with five children in a three-bedroom Dunedin North cottage with no electric lighting. In the Depression, his father was unemployed plumber who had to plant pine seedlings on a work scheme. Hubbard's first job was on a Taieri Plains dairy farm. He then worked as a clerk for Trustees Executors while studying part-time for his School Certificate, University Entrance and an accountancy degree from the universities of Otago and Canterbury. In 1953, he and Jean Hubbard, who had been a fellow student at Otago, moved to Timaru where he did bookkeeping for the Craighead school while establishing the accounting firm Hubbard Churcher. In the mid-1950s he provided the backing for Doug Shears and Helicopters New Zealand Ltd. Also in the 1950s, Hubbard gained control of South Canterbury Finance, a small-time lender to local businesses and households. In 1962 Hubbard bought a dairy farm.

== South Canterbury Finance ==
In 1926, South Canterbury Finance Ltd started as a small-time lender to local businesses and households in Timaru. Allan Hubbard bought South Canterbury Finance in either the 1950s or in 1960. According to Lee, Hubbard and Hugo Fanning established South Canterbury Acceptances and South Canterbury Credit Corp by 1960. They acquired South Canterbury Finance (SCF) by 1963 from a group of businessmen including a member of the Todd family. In 1964 Hubbard bought Fanning out, becoming the sole owner. The "originally modest" company began to achieve "real size" after buying Canterbury Finance from Humphrey Rolleston in 1986, in return for a 23% holding in Southbury Group, the owner of SCF and Hubbard's other assets. Rolleston and Hubbard established a series of regional finance companies. Rolleston left SCF in 2004.

Hubbard was considered the driving force behind the company's growth as it ultimately became the largest financial institution in the South Island of New Zealand. By the late 2000s, South Canterbury Finance had 35,000 investors and its assets were considered to be worth almost $NZ2 billion. South Canterbury Finance owned 13 companies including fruit packaging and warehousing company Scales Corporation, helicopter and tourism business Helicopters NZ, and a third shareholding in Dairy Holdings Limited, New Zealand's largest dairy farming group.

Despite its reputation as a South Island rural lender, South Canterbury Finance made loans to property development throughout New Zealand, Australia and Fiji. At 30 June 2009, property loans were $414.2 million. Real estate lending represented 207 loans with an average net loan value of $1.15 million. Further, 37 per cent of lending was secured by a second or lower ranking mortgages. There were ten property loans greater than $10 million. For some lending, the interest was capitalised into the loan debt, so borrowers did not have to immediately fund interest payments.

In June 2010, Allan Hubbard stood down as Chairman of South Canterbury Finance and was replaced by Bill Baylis.

On 31 August 2010, South Canterbury Finance asked its trustee to place it in receivership after negotiations over a recapitalisation deal failed. The Government immediately paid out investors $NZ1.6 billion under the Government's Retail Deposit Guarantee Scheme. Alan Hubbard was reported blaming the Government and the other South Canterbury Finance directors for the receivership: as the directors had sidelined him and the Government had placed him in statutory management.

On 7 December 2011, the Serious Fraud Office laid 21 charges against five individuals in respect of South Canterbury Finance. The charges related to a variety of allegedly fraudulent transactions which had a total estimated value of approximately $1.7 billion. This included an estimated $1.58 billion from the Crown Retail Deposits Guarantee Scheme. The charges included entering the Crown Guarantee Scheme by deception, omitting to disclose a related party loan of $64.185m from SCF to Southbury Group and Woolpak Holdings, failing to disclose related party loans of $19.1m from SCF to Shark Wholesalers, and breaching the crown guarantee scheme by lending $39m to Quadrant Holding Limited. The five accused were; former South Canterbury Finance chief executive Lachie McLeod, former South Canterbury Finance directors Edward Oral Sullivan and Robert Alexander White (a lawyer with Raymond Sullivan McGlashan), former chief financial officer of South Canterbury Finance, Graeme Brown, and Timaru chartered accountant Terry Hutton, formerly of Hubbard and Churcher. The alleged offences included theft by a person in a special relationship, obtaining by deception, false statements by a promoter of a company and false accounting. All five defendants denied the charges. A date of Monday 28 May 2012 was set for a post committal conference. In 2013 charges against Brown and Hutton were dropped, leaving the former chief executive (McLeod) and two former directors (Sullivan and White) to stand trial.

== Statutory management ==
On 20 June 2010, the New Zealand Government placed Allan Hubbard, his wife Jean Hubbard and his business Aorangi Securities and seven charitable trusts into statutory management, with Trevor Thornton and Richard Simpson of Grant Thornton New Zealand Limited appointed as statutory managers. This decision was based on recommendations from the Securities Commission of New Zealand after a complaint from an investor. Allan Hubbard established Aorangi Securities Limited in 1974. The directors were Allan and Margaret Hubbard and the share capital was owned by another Hubbard-owned company, Forresters Nominee Company Limited. Aorangi had operated as a finance company, having raised $98 million from 407 investors living in Otago and Canterbury and making loans of approximately $134 million to borrowers. The review of the Securities Commission concluded that many of the loans were inadequately documented, appeared to be unsecured and contrary to instructions from investors. The Serious Fraud Office initiated an investigation for fraud.

The news was met with disbelief in his home town of Timaru and elsewhere in the South Island, where Hubbard was seen as a pillar of the community. There was widespread support for Allan Hubbard and a rally was held for him on 26 June 2010 in Timaru attended by thousands of people who protested against the investigation. In June 2010, supporters of Allan Hubbard started a campaign to clear his name.

In July 2010, the Statutory Managers reported that Allan Hubbard also controlled an additional business that they had not been aware of when appointed. This was Hubbard Funds Management, an investment management business estimated to be worth $70 million. It had inadequate accounting records consisting of a hand written cashbook and journals maintained by Mr Hubbard.

In September 2010, two further companies related to Hubbard Funds Management, Hubbard Churcher Trust Management Ltd and Forresters Nominee Company Ltd, were also placed under statutory management. On 11 May 2011, Allan and Jean Hubbard filed judicial review proceedings in the Timaru High Court to challenge the decision to place them into statutory management.

Two other assessments of the statutory management were also released in September 2011. On 6 September 2011, Kerry Grass released a report to the Government. Businessman Tur Borren also provided a report on statutory management.

After an independent review of the statutory management organised by the Registrar of Companies, Jean Hubbard was released from statutory management on 11 November 2011.

In May 2012, Statutory Managers Grant Thornton New Zealand Limited reported that investors in Hubbard Management Funds were owed $82 million, and the fund was valued at $44.8m. Grant Thornton asked the High Court to decide how to distribute the fund given the lack of a prospectus and given that the 'largely fictional' investor statements had not been reconciled to investment assets for three years.

In October 2015, Statutory Managers Grant Thornton reported paying out 99% of the money investors put into Aorangi Securities Limited, and all of the money originally put in by investors to Hubbard Management Funds. This led critics to question whether statutory management had been necessary or if the right approach had been taken by the statutory managers during their period of administration.

== Serious Fraud Office investigation ==
On 20 June 2011, the Serious Fraud Office announced that it had laid fifty charges of alleged fraud under sections 220, 242 and 260 of the Crimes Act against Alan Hubbard in the Timaru District Court.

On 9 September 2011, the Timaru District Court made an order permanently staying the prosecution of Allan James Hubbard in light of Mr Hubbard's death.

== Honours and awards ==
In 1990, Hubbard was awarded the New Zealand 1990 Commemoration Medal. In the 2005 Queen's Birthday Honours, he was appointed a Companion of the Queen's Service Order, for community service.
