= Sue Chetwin =

New Zealand journalist and consumer rights advocate

Sue Chetwin CNZM
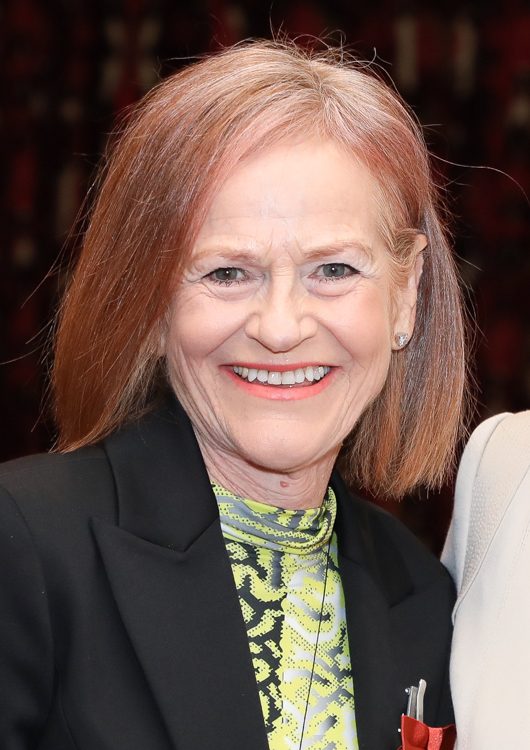
- Chetwin in 2021
- Awards: Companion of the New Zealand Order of Merit

Suzanne Eleanor Chetwin CNZM is a New Zealand journalist and consumer rights advocate. She was the editor of several newspapers, including the Sunday News, the Sunday Star-Times and the Herald on Sunday, and the chief executive of Consumer New Zealand for thirteen years. In 2021 Chetwin was appointed a Companion of the New Zealand Order of Merit for services to consumer rights.

== Career ==
Chetwin began her working life as a journalist, and in 1994 was editor of the Sunday News, and then from 1998 to 2003, the editor of the Sunday Star-Times. She was the founding editor of the Herald on Sunday, from 2003 until 2005. Chetwin was the Chief Executive of the consumer advice service Consumer New Zealand from 2007 until 2020. During her time at Consumer NZ, Chetwin led work on country of origin labelling, unfair terms, mandatory standards for sunscreens, and consumer protections related to door sales. She resigned from Consumer in 2020 to complete her law degree.

In early 2024 it was announced that Chetwin would lead a new lobby group, called Grocery Action Group, aimed at persuading supermarkets to lower grocery prices, after the Commerce Commission determined the sector has excessive profits.

Chetwin is a board member of the Financial Markets Authority, and Food Standards Australia New Zealand.

Chetwin was Chair of the Government review of drug buying agency Pharmac, chair of the InternetNZ Policy Review Advisory Panel, and chaired the independent consumer panel giving advice to Chorus.

== Honours and awards ==
In the 2021 New Years Honours, Chetwin was appointed a Companion of the New Zealand Order of Merit for services to consumer rights.

== Selected works ==
- Chetwin, Sue (29 July 2024). "Baby formula labels a recipe for success". The New Zealand Herald.
- Chetwin, Sue (3 January 2024). "Opinion: Time for consumers to take the fight to supermarket duopolies". The New Zealand Herald.
