= Goodman Group =

Australian property developer

- Type: Public
- Traded as: ASX: GMG
- Industry: Commercial property
- Founded: 1989; 37 years ago
- Founder: Gregory Goodman
- Headquarters: Sydney, New South Wales, Australia
- Area served: Australia, New Zealand, Asia, Europe, the United Kingdom, North America and Brazil
- Key people: Gregory Goodman (Group CEO); Anthony Rozic (Deputy CEO); Nick Vrondas (Group CFO); Nick Kurtis (Group Head of Equities)
- Net income: ▲ A$2,778,700,000 2026-06-30
- Total assets: ▲ A$89,000,000,000 2026-06-30
- Number of employees: 1,000 at 2026-06-30
- Website: www.goodman.com

Goodman Group is a provider of essential infrastructure. It owns, develops and manages real estate. This includes warehouses, large scale logistics facilities, business and office parks and data centers globally.

== History ==
The organisation was founded in Australia in 1989 as a private property trust focused on industrial properties, listing on the Australian Securities Exchange (ASX) in 1995 as Goodman Hardie Industrial Property Trust with eight properties valued at A$75 million. In 2000 the trust merged with Macquarie Industrial Trust and was renamed Macquarie Goodman Industrial Trust.

The organisation changed its name to Macquarie Goodman Group in 2005 following a series of acquisitions and mergers, which made it the largest industrial property group in the ASX All Ordinaries Index.

In July 2007, the organisation was renamed to its present name, after Macquarie Bank sold its 7.7% interest almost a year earlier. Goodman is now one of the largest providers of industrial property and business space in the world, following the expansion of its operations into Europe, Asia and the Americas through a series of acquisitions and organic growth.

As of 30 June 2026, the Group had 446 properties under management in 15 countries and 27.3 million sqm under management. It had market capitalisation of approx. A$59.9 billion.

== Revenue ==
The Group delivered an operating profit of $2,675 million as of 30 June 2026, up 15% on FY25, and operating earnings per security (OEPS) of 129.9 cents, up 10.1% on FY25. It is split into three divisions: property portfolio, development and funds management.

On 30 June 2026, Goodman Group reported A$89.0 billion total portfolio, with A$19.7 billion in development work in progress, across 50 projects in 12 countries. Data centers currently make up 78% of the development WIP. The Group has a total power bank of 6.4 GW, with 3.6 GW secured and 2.8 GW in advanced procurement, across 16 major global cities.

== See also ==
- Bridgecorp Holdings
