= Imputation (law) =

Principle that all laws are published, so ignorance is not an excuse

In law, the principle of imputation or attribution underpins the concept that ignorantia juris non excusat—ignorance of the law does not excuse. All laws are published and available for study in all developed states. The said imputation might also be termed "fair notice". The content of the law is imputed to all persons who are within the jurisdiction, no matter how transiently.

This fiction tries to negate the unfairness of someone avoiding liability for an act or omission by simply denying knowledge of the law. The principle also arises in specific areas of law, such as criminal law and commercial law, to describe the need for the law to hold a person liable, even when they may not have known the particular circumstances that caused another person to sustain loss or damage.

== Criminal law ==
=== Corporate liability ===
To incur liability for a crime, a person must have both committed a prohibited act (the actus reus, which must be willed: see automatism) and have had an appropriate mental element (the mens rea) at the relevant time (see the technical requirement for concurrence). A key component of the mens rea is any knowledge that the alleged criminal might have had. For these purposes, knowledge can be both actual and constructive—i.e., the court can impute knowledge where appropriate.

There is no ambiguity when the alleged criminal actually intended to cause the particular harm. Things are more difficult when the defendant denies actual knowledge. When evaluating behavior, the legal process assumes the defendant was aware of their immediate physical surroundings and understood practical cause and effect. A mens rea is imputed when a person with reasonable foresight in the same circumstances would have foreseen that the actus reus would occur. This prevents a person from raising a defence based on willful blindness (note that in the United States, wilful blindness has a slightly different meaning).

A problem arises when the defendant is a corporation. By its nature, a fictitious person can only act through the human agency of the natural persons that it employs. Equally, it has no mind to constitute the mens rea. Hence, the notion of vicarious liability for companies and other business entities exclusively depends on the ability to impute knowledge.

The test is one of identification. If the natural person who acts can be "identified with the mind of the company" when performing the actions forming the actus reus, all the relevant mental elements will be imputed to the company. This test, sometimes termed the alter ego test, is objective and cannot be distracted by the job title or description formally held by the human agent. This prevents evasion of liability by the simple expedient of naming the real director of affairs as the janitor.

However, not all actions trigger this transference. When acting, the human agent identified as the mind must be promoting the company's interests in some practical way. If they are engaged in an entirely personal activity—e.g., attacking a fellow employee out of anger or stealing from the company—the courts do not impute the relevant mens rea to the company.

In the United States, the courts use a three-pronged test to determine whether a corporation is vicariously liable for the acts of its employees:

1. The employee must have acted within the scope of employment.
2. The employee must have acted, at least partly, to benefit the corporation.
3. It must be reasonable to impute the employee's acts and intentions to the corporation.

=== Joint principals ===
A standard example of imputation arises through the principle of joint endeavour. Where two or more people embark on a joint exercise, they are equally liable for everything that happens during the execution of their plan. For this purpose, joint principals are treated as knowing everything that happens, whether they were present or not. The requisite mens rea formed by one is imputed to the others to enable a conviction. For example, suppose that a gang conspire to rob a bank. One remains outside in the car to ensure a quick escape. If the others kill a guard inside the bank, the driver is jointly liable for the homicide.

== Agency ==
In the majority of agency situations, agents must be allowed some degree of discretion in the conduct of routine transactions. Hence, there is no need to seek specific authorisation for every deal or detail within a deal. But, when the agent acts with actual or apparent authority, all the agent's knowledge will be imputed to the principal. If principals were allowed to hide behind their agents' ignorance, mistakes, or failures to communicate, they could achieve better results than if they acted personally. For example, if the particular deal turned out well, the principal could adopt the transaction—if it turned out badly, the principal could disavow it. If not for imputation, there would be a perverse incentive to conduct business through agents rather than personally. Consequently, the principal cannot exploit ignorance to advantage by instructing the agent to withhold key information, or by appointing an agent known to be secretive.

This rule in favour of imputation relates to the generality of the duties an agent owes to a principal, in particular the agent's duty to communicate material facts to the principal. Since the purpose of the law is to offer protection to Third Parties who act in good faith, it is reasonable to allow them to believe that, in most cases, the agents have fulfilled this duty. After all, the principal selects the agents and has the power to control their actions both through express instructions and incentives intended to influence their behaviour which will include laying down routines for how agents should handle information, and the extent to which agents will be rewarded for transmitting information of commercial value. The result is a form of strict liability in which the legal consequences of an agent's acts or omissions are attributed to a principal even when the principal was without fault in appointing or supervising the agent.

== Liability of corporations in tort ==
In English law, a corporation can only act through its employees and agents so it is necessary to decide in which circumstances the law of agency or vicarious liability will apply to hold the corporation liable in tort for the frauds of its directors or senior officers. If liability for the particular tort requires a state of mind, then to be liable, the director or senior officer must have that state of mind and it must be attributed to the company.

In Meridian Global Funds Management Asia Ltd v Securities Commission [1995] 2 AC 500, two employees of the company, acting within the scope of their authority but unknown to the directors, used company funds to acquire some shares. The question was whether the company knew, or ought to have known that it had acquired those shares. The Privy Council held that it did. Whether by virtue of their actual or ostensible authority as agents acting within their authority (see Lloyd v Grace, Smith & Co. [1912] AC 716) or as employees acting in the course of their employment (see Armagas Limited v Mundogas S.A. [1986] 1 AC 717), their acts and omissions and their knowledge could be attributed to the company, and this could give rise to liability as joint tortfeasors where the directors have assumed responsibility on their own behalf and not just on behalf of the company.

So, if a director or officer is expressly authorised to represent a particular class on behalf of the company, and makes a fraudulent representation that causes loss to a Third Party, the company is liable, even though the representation was an improper way of doing what he was authorised to do. The extent of authority is a question fact and is significantly more than the fact of an employment that gave the employee the opportunity to carry out the fraud.

In Panorama Developments (Guildford) Ltd v Fidelis Furnishing Fabrics Ltd [1971] 2 QB 711, a company secretary fraudulently hired cars for his own use without the managing director knowing. A company secretary routinely enters into contracts in the company's name and has administrative responsibilities that would give apparent authority to hire cars. Hence, the company was liable.

== General references ==
- Demott, Deborah A. "When is a Principal Charged with an Agent's Knowledge?" 13 Duke Journal of Comparative & International Law. 291
