= Financial Markets Authority (New Zealand) =

Financial regulator in New Zealand

Agency overview
- Formed: 1 May 2011
- Preceding agency: Securities Commission of New Zealand
- Jurisdiction: New Zealand
- Headquarters: Wellington, New Zealand
- Agency executives: Craig Stobo, Chairman; Samantha Barrass, Chief executive
- Website: www.fma.govt.nz

The Financial Markets Authority (FMA, Maori:Te Mana Tātai Hokohoko) is a New Zealand government agency responsible for financial regulation. It is responsible for regulating all financial market participants, exchanges and the setting and enforcing of financial regulations.

== History ==
The authority was established on 1 May 2011 as part of the Financial Markets (Regulators and KiwiSaver) Bill which was passed by the New Zealand parliament on the 7 April 2011. It was established in a wake of criticism over its predecessor, the Securities Commission, being unable to halt the failure of a large number of finance companies and to stem investor losses in the period between 2006 and 2010. It was introduced by Commerce Minister Simon Power, with him saying "This move is at the centre of the Government's drive to restore the confidence of mum and dad investors in our financial markets."

On 5 December 2025, the FMA's chairperson Craig Stobo agreed to temporarily step aside from his governance and leadership duties pending an ongoing investigation by the Ministry of Business, Innovation and Employment (MBIE).

== Structure ==
The FMA is controlled by a board appointed by the Minister of Commerce and run by chief executive Samantha Barrass. The board comprises chairman Craig Stobo and members Sue Chetwin, Prasanna Gai, Christopher Swasbrook, Kendall Flutey, Steven Bardy, Tracey Berry, Nick Hegan and Mariette van Ryn.

== Priorities ==
The FMA's official website says its key statutory objective is "to promote and facilitate the development of fair, efficient, and transparent financial markets" and that it "will use the full range of its enforcement powers, targeting conduct that presents the greatest likelihood of harm to the function of open, transparent and efficient capital markets." Since it was established in 2011, it has been involved in legal action against Bridgecorp, KA Trustee Ltd, Perpetual, Hanover Finance, Lombard Finance, Sean Wood, Nathans Finance, Bernard Whimp and David Ross.

== See also ==
- Securities Commission
- Finance company collapses, 2006-12 (New Zealand)
- List of financial supervisory authorities by country
