= Hanover Finance =

Hanover Group
- Type: Private
- Predecessor: Elders Finance
- Founded: 1999
- Defunct: 2010
- Fate: Receivership
- Headquarters: Auckland, New Zealand
- Area served: New Zealand
- Key people: Mark Hotchin, Eric Watson
- Services: Property development
- Subsidiaries: United Finance; Nationwide Finance; FAI Finance

Hanover Finance was a New Zealand non-bank finance company that focused on lending for high-risk property development that failed in 2010 under the leadership of Mark Hotchin. At the time of its failure it was the largest finance company in New Zealand. The Hanover Group also had interests in property and was responsible for developing Matarangi Beach Estates and golf course, and acquired completed lots at the Jacks Point property sub-division in Queenstown. The Group also had property and finance interests in Australia.

== History ==
Mark Hotchin and business partner Eric Watson bought Elders Finance in 1999. Elders, and a number of other finance companies, were brought together to create Hanover Group. With $650 million in assets, this was New Zealand's third largest finance company at the time. In 2007, Forbes listed Hotchin and Watson as the 33rd and 34th richest people in New Zealand and Australia.

Hotchin's interests ranged outside the traditional finance company model. In 2003 Hotchin through the Hanover Group bought a 10% stake in Tower, a large fund management and insurance business. Hanover wanted a better deal for investors and forced Tower and owners GPG to review the capital raising and underwrite deal they had agreed.

In 2007 Hanover Group made an after tax profit of $105m. Controversially Hanover Finance paid NZ$45.5 million in dividends to Hotchin and Watson in the year ending 30 June 2008. Much of these dividends were then reinvested back into the company to reduce related party transactions, which at the time were around 14% of the loan book.

=== Start of decline 2008 ===
As a result of the 2008 financial crisis, in July 2008, Hanover Finance and United Finance froze repayments of NZ$554 million owed to 36,500 investors. After a vote over 85% of investors agreed to a debt repayment plan for the return of their capital over a 5-year time scale, predicated on the recovery of the New Zealand property market. Hotchin and Watson pledged a property, benefits and cash package worth up to $96m to investors as part of the deal. By November 2009 accountancy firm PwC estimated that the package had fallen in value to between $36 million and $56 million, due to a fall in property prices. Over the first year of the debt repayment plan, six cents in the dollar was repaid to investors, however the property market had continued to worsen and it appeared the company was heading for receivership.

In 2009 Hanover was approached by Allied Farmers to buy the assets of Hanover Finance and United Finance, effectively held in limbo by the repayment plan. In December 2009 Hanover Group debenture holders, note holders and bond holders were given another opportunity to vote for receivership or for the new plan with Allied. 75% voted in favour of swapping their debentures, notes and bonds for shares in Allied Farmers Limited. This transaction resulted in Allied Farmers assuming the net asset position of the Hanover Group finance companies.

=== Failure ===
Allied Farmers put their finance company Allied Nationwide into receivership on 20 August 2010 and as at March 2011 shares in were worth only a fraction of what they were traded for.

=== Aftermath ===
In late December 2011, the Financial Markets Authority (FMA) announced that it proposed to file civil proceedings against the directors and promoters of Hanover Finance Limited and other companies relating to statements made in the December 2007 prospectuses and subsequent advertisements.

As a result of the FMA's announcement former Hanover Finance's chairman Greg Muir issued a media statement saying that "the FMA investigators were given a substantial amount of evidence demonstrating that the directors conducted themselves responsibly, with appropriate rigour, and made judgments they believed were in the best interests of the company and its investors on the information available to them at the time."

In December 2012, the remaining property assets of Hanover and United Finance (with a book value of $13.5 million) were transferred from Allied Farmers to Crown Asset Management, the entity set up to hold assets from failed finance companies backed by the Government's deposit guarantee.

== See also ==
- Finance company collapses, 2006-12 (New Zealand)
