= Meridian Global Funds Management Asia Ltd v Securities Commission =

New Zealand company law case

- Court: Judicial Committee of the Privy Council
- Decided: 26 May 1995
- Citations: [1995] UKPC 5, [1995] BCC 942, [1995] 3 All ER 918, [1995] UKPC 5, [1995] 3 WLR 413, [1995] 2 BCLC 116, [1995] 2 AC 500

Court membership
- Judges sitting: Lord Keith of Kinkel; Lord Jauncev; Lord Mustill; Lord Lloyd of Berwick; Lord Hoffmann

Case opinions
- Lord Hoffman

Keywords
- Derivative claim

Meridian Global Funds Management Asia Ltd v Securities Commission [1995] UKPC 5 is a New Zealand company law case, also relevant for United Kingdom company law, decided by the Privy Council. The Privy Council's ruling referred to "rules of attribution" in relation to company actions, i.e. "rules whereby the acts of natural persons were [to be] attributed to the company".

== Facts ==
Meridian was part of a syndicate bidding to take over NZ company, Euro National Corp Ltd. Mr Koo and Mr Ng, investment managers working for Meridian, bought 49% of Euro's shares, but Meridian failed to disclose to the Securities Commission of New Zealand that they had become a 'substantial security holder' of over 5% because Koo and Ng wanted to hide the transaction from their superiors. The Commission imposed fines against Koo and Ng, and also against Meridian. The company argued it was not liable because it had not known about the acquisition.

Heron J held Meridian knew it was a substantial property holder, because as employees the knowledge of Koo and Ng was attributable to the company. The New Zealand Court of Appeal held that Koo's knowledge should be attributable because he was the 'directing mind and will' of the company. Meridian argued that was only the board, not Koo.

== Advice ==
Lord Hoffmann for the Privy Council advised that 'there would be little sense in deeming such a persona ficta to exist unless there were also rules to tell one what acts were to count as acts of the company. It is therefore a necessary part of corporate personality that there should be rules by which acts are attributed to the company. These may be called 'the rules of attribution'. There can be rules in the constitution or rules implied (e.g. shareholders acting unanimously are the company, Multinational Gas). Otherwise, the principles of agency apply, and the company acts through its servants and agents.

9. These primary rules of attribution are obviously not enough to enable a company to go out into the world and do business. Not every act on behalf of the company could be expected to be the subject of a resolution of the board or a unanimous decision of the shareholders. The company therefore builds upon the primary rules of attribution by using general rules of attribution which are equally available to natural persons, namely, the principles of agency. It will appoint servants and agents whose acts, by a combination of the general principles of agency and the company's primary rules of attribution, count as the acts of the company. And having done so, it will also make itself subject to the general rules by which liability for the acts of others can be attributed to natural persons, such as estoppel or ostensible authority in contract and vicarious liability in tort.

10. It is worth pausing at this stage to make what may seem an obvious point. Any statement about what a company has or has not done, or can or cannot do, is necessarily a reference to the rules of attribution (primary and general) as they apply to that company. Judges sometimes say that a company "as such" cannot do anything; it must act by servants or agents. This may seem an unexceptionable, even banal remark. And of course the meaning is usually perfectly clear. But a reference to a company "as such" might suggest that there is something out there called the company of which one can meaningfully say that it can or cannot do something. There is in fact no such thing as the company as such, no ding an sich, (Note: German for "thing in itself") only the applicable rules. To say that a company cannot do something means only that there is no one whose doing of that act would, under the applicable rules of attribution, count as an act of the company.

11. The company's primary rules of attribution together with the general principles of agency, vicarious liability and so forth are usually sufficient to enable one to determine its rights and obligations. In exceptional cases, however, they will not provide an answer. This will be the case when a rule of law, either expressly or by implication, excludes attribution on the basis of the general principles of agency or vicarious liability. For example, a rule may be stated in language primarily applicable to a natural person and require some act or state of mind on the part of that person "himself", as opposed to his servants or agents. This is generally true of rules of the criminal law, which ordinarily impose liability only for the actus reus and mens rea of the defendant himself. How is such a rule to be applied to a company?

12. One possibility is that the court may come to the conclusion that the rule was not intended to apply to companies at all; for example, a law which created an offence for which the only penalty was community service. Another possibility is that the court might interpret the law as meaning that it could apply to a company only on the basis of its primary rules of attribution, i.e. if the act giving rise to liability was specifically authorised by a resolution of the board or a unanimous agreement of the shareholders. But there will be many cases in which neither of these solutions is satisfactory; in which the court considers that the law was intended to apply to companies and that, although it excludes ordinary vicarious liability, insistence on the primary rules of attribution would in practice defeat that intention. In such a case, the court must fashion a special rule of attribution for the particular substantive rule. This is always a matter of interpretation: given that it was intended to apply to a company, how was it intended to apply? Whose act (or knowledge, or state of mind) was for this purpose intended to count as the act etc. of the company? One finds the answer to this question by applying the usual canons of interpretation, taking into account the language of the rule (if it is a statute) and its content and policy.

...

23. ...the fact that a company’s employee is authorised to drive a lorry does not in itself lead to the conclusion that if he kills someone by reckless driving, the company will be guilty of manslaughter. There is no inconsistency. Each is an example of an attribution rule for a particular purpose, tailored as it always must be to the terms and policies of the substantive rule...

== See also ==
- United Kingdom company law
- Corporate manslaughter
- Imputation (law)
- Russian Commercial and Industrial Bank v Comptoir d'Estcompte de Mulhouse [1923] 2 KB 630
