= Securities Commission of New Zealand =

Financial Markets Regulator

Securities Commission

Agency overview
- Formed: 1978
- Dissolved: 30 April 2011
- Superseding agency: Financial Markets Authority
- Headquarters: Wellington, New Zealand
- Employees: 51
- Agency executive: Jane Diplock, Chairman (2001–2011)
- Key documents
- Website: http://www.sec-com.govt.nz/

Footnotes
- The Financial Markets Authority no longer officially recognises this predecessor organisation.

The Securities Commission was an independent Crown entity of the government of New Zealand and the main regulator of investments. It was replaced on 1 May 2011 by the Financial Markets Authority.

It was responsible for enforcement, monitoring and market oversight of the securities markets, authorising participants and promoting public understanding of investments. This included authorising the New Zealand Stock Exchange with which it ran a co-regulatory model.

On 27 April 2010, the New Zealand minister for commerce Simon Power announced that the Securities Commission would be replaced by a new integrated financial regulator, the Financial Markets Authority.

== History ==
The commission was first established under the Securities Act 1978 which determines its powers and functions.

The commissions role was modified and extended by a number of additional pieces of legislation. These include the Securities Markets Act 1988, the Investment Advisers (Disclosure) Act 1996, the Securities Regulations 1983, the Securities Act (Contributory Mortgage) Regulations 1988, and the Securities (Fees) Regulations 1998.

The Financial Advisers Act 2008 gave the Securities Commission new responsibilities to register and set minimum standards for financial advisers. There was some concern that the commission did not have the resources to effectively carry out its responsibilities and that this additional responsibility would make the situation worse.

The agency was chaired by Jane Diplock from 2001 until it was disbanded in 2011 and faced criticism for its handling of the collapse of a large number of finance companies. Jane Diplock was also the chairperson of the International Organization of Securities Commissions (IOSCO) during her time as chairperson of the Securities Commission.

== Responsibilities and functions ==
The Securities Commission undertook the following roles:

- Enforcement, monitoring and market oversight
- Law reform
- Exemptions
- Authorisations
- International co-operation and
- Promoting public understanding

== Notable cases ==
- In May 1993 the Commission published an extensive report on the manipulation of reported profits by the largely Government-owned Bank of New Zealand. "Arrangements" to make the manipulation look valid were put in place in March 1988 but in the event they were not used until the Bank's 1990 year, when the Bank's profit was overstated by $55m.
- Meridian Global Funds Management Asia Ltd v Securities Commission, Privy Council, 1995
- In June 2007, Michael Fay and David Richwhite through one of the companies that they co-owned, Midavia Rail Investments, paid $20 million to the commission to settle insider trading proceedings relating to Tranz Rail. In October 2004 the commission accused Midavia of insider trading and Richwhite of tipping off Midavia to sell $63 million worth of shares while knowing Tranz Rail was facing financial problems, which was not known to the public. The commission noted that the payments had been made "without any admission of liability".
- On 11 November 2007 the NZ Securities Commission issued a report into two matters concerning Feltex Carpets Ltd which by then had gone into liquidation with the probable loss of all shareholders funds. The first matter was an Initial Public Offer made in April 2004 by which a sole shareholder sold all its shares to the public for about $250m. The report declared that this IPO was not misleading in any material particular. Nevertheless, over three thousand of the eight thousand subscribers to this IPO have taken legal action against various parties associated with making the offering on the grounds that the offering was misleading. The High Court (Houghton v Saunders) found against the shareholders and as at April 2016 the matter is being considered by the Court of Appeal.

In the second matter the Securities Commission reported that Feltex had overstated the length of tenure of most of its extensive bank debt in its half-yearly report to 31 December 2005. The Ministry of Economic Development took legal action against five of the Feltex directors as a result of this Securities Commission report but in MED v Feeney Judge M Doogue dismissed the charges. Judge Doogue specialised in family court matters. Less than a year after this judgement she was promoted to Chief District Court Judge.

- On 20 June 2010, the Securities Commission put the finance company South Canterbury Finance, which was run by Allan Hubbard, into statutory management after complaints from a number of investors. This also triggered an investigation by the Serious Fraud Office (New Zealand). Eight weeks later on 31 August 2010, South Canterbury Finance was placed in receivership.
- In late 2010, the Securities Commission successfully applied to the High Court to have the assets of former director of finance company Hanover Finance, Mark Hotchin frozen.

== See also ==
- Securities Commission
