= Mortimer Hotchin =

Australian cricketer

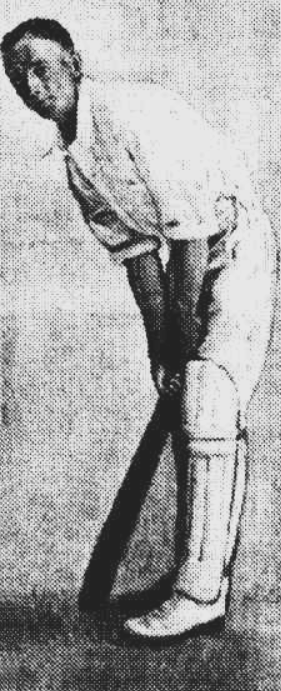

Personal information
- Full name: Mortimer Douglas Hotchin
- Born: 20 May 1889; Melbourne, Australia
- Died: 21 June 1958 (aged 69); Melbourne, Australia

Domestic team information
- Years: Team
- 1912-1915: Victoria
- Source: Cricinfo, 16 November 2015

Mortimer Hotchin (20 May 1889 – 21 June 1958) was an Australian cricketer. He played four first-class cricket matches for Victoria between 1912 and 1915.

== Cricket career ==
Hotchin was attending Scotch College as of 1902, and in 1906 he represented the College in a cricket match against alumni and scored a 50 not out. In 1907 he scored 248 in an innings in a school cricket match for the College.

In 1910 Hotchin began playing for the St. Kilda Cricket Club in district cricket, and the club won the district premiership that year. In 1912 he topped the batting averages for St. Kilda with an average of 54.26 over nine innings, and in November that year he was selected to represent Victoria in a non Sheffield Shield First-class game against Western Australia and he opened the batting and scored 86 in Victoria's second innings. In December 1912 he was selected in the Victorian Colts team. In January 1913 the Victorian selectors were criticized for dropping Hotchin from the First-class team after his debut, and he was re-selected for a Sheffield Shield game against South Australia in February 1913 although his batting was unremarkable in the game.

In October 1914 it was reported Hotchin was having a strong start to the district season with his batting, and in December he was selected in the Victorian squad as an emergency replacement batsman. He played in a match against New South Wales as Roy Park was unable to play in late December but only scored 15 and a duck. In January 1915 he was selected to represent Victoria against Tasmania but was unimpressive with the bat in what was his last First-class game. In March 1915 the Melbourne newspaper The Herald published an article praising his remarkable consistency noting that for the past four district seasons he had averaged 47.04 despite only making one century and the article criticized the selectors handling of him.

In December 1921 Hotchin was selected to represent the Victorian Second XI, and he represented the Second XI again in December 1922. As of November 1923 he had begun playing Lawn Tennis rather than cricket.

== See also ==
- List of Victoria first-class cricketers
