= Julie Cassidy =

Australian-New Zealand law academic (1965–2023)

- Born: 17 June 1965
- Died: 2 September 2023 (aged 58); Auckland, New Zealand
- Other name: Julie Ann Cassidy
- Education: Bond University
- Scientific career
- Workplaces: University of Adelaide; Bond University; Deakin University; Auckland University of Technology; University of Auckland
- Thesis: Customary international law's protection of aboriginal rights in post colonial states (as at February 1992) (1992)

Julie Ann Cassidy (17 June 1965 – September 2023) was an Australian law academic. She was a full professor at the University of Auckland.

== Academic career ==
Julie Ann Cassidy was born on 17 June 1965. After undergraduate and honours studies at the University of Adelaide, she taught law at Adelaide before being a foundation staffer at Bond University, where she earned her PhD with a thesis titled Customary international law's protection of aboriginal rights in post colonial states (as at February 1992). Subsequently, she worked at Deakin University, Auckland University of Technology and finally the University of Auckland. She also had an adjunct relationship with Monash University.

Cassidy's research included 'Brightline' tax measures, GST anti-avoidance measures and post-colonial law.

Cassidy died in September 2023, at the age of 58.

== Selected works ==
- Bosch, Henry, and Julie Cassidy. Corporate practices and conduct. Deakin University, 1994.
- Cassidy, Julie. "Sovereignty of aboriginal peoples." Ind. Int'l & Comp. L. Rev. 9 (1998): 65.
- Cassidy, Julie. Concise corporations law. Federation Press, 2006.
- Cassidy, Julie. "Emergence of the individual as an international juristic entity: Enforcement of international human rights." (2004): 533.
- Cassidy, Julie. "The stolen generations-Canada and Australia: The legacy of assimilation." (2006): 131.
