= GoodReader =

Document viewing application

- Original author: Yuri Selukoff
- Developer: Good.iWare Ltd.
- Release: January 28, 2009; 17 years ago
- Operating system: iOS
- Website: www.goodreader.com

GoodReader is an iOS application used to primarily edit PDF documents. It was originally developed in Moscow by Good.iWare Ltd., a company started by Yuri Selukoff, a Russian developer. Yuri has subsequently relocated to the United States and started Good.iWare, Inc. in San Francisco, California.

== Features ==
GoodReader supports opening and viewing numerous file types, including most document and video file formats, including HTML, audiobooks, and pictures. PDF files can be annotated and manipulated by the user. Syncing with various cloud storage services including Box, Dropbox, Google Drive and iCloud Drive is also supported. GoodReader can also read PDF documents aloud using text-to-speech.

== History ==
GoodReader was first released by Good.iWare in 2009.

In 2014, GoodReader 4 was released as a major update. Unlike previous updates, it was launched as a new standalone app, so existing users had to repurchase it from the App Store. The update introduced several new features, including tools to manipulate PDF files, manage document pages, and view page previews, while allowing data migration from earlier versions.

On January 28, 2019, GoodReader 5 was released as a major update. This update included an overhauled UI, support for the Apple Pencil 2, AES-256 encryption, and other general security features. This latest version also allows iPad users to view documents side-by-side in split-screen.
