= Eric Watson (businessman) =

New Zealand businessman (born 1959)

Eric Watson (born 1959) is a former businessman from New Zealand.

In 2011, the National Business Review listed Watson as the 21st richest New Zealander. However, he was removed from the 2019 NBR Rich List.

== Personal ==
He attended Xavier College in Christchurch where he enjoyed his schooling. His first job on leaving school was as a butcher's apprentice. He later became a sales and branch manager at Whitcoulls and then a manager for Xerox.

== Businesses ==
He left Xerox in 1992 to start the Blue Star Group.

=== Hanover ===
Watson and business partner Mark Hotchin bought Elders Finance in 1999. Elders, and a number of other finance companies, were brought together to create Hanover Group. In July 2008 the finance companies within Hanover Group froze repayments, suspending acceptance of new deposits.

Hanover paid dividends of NZ$41 million in the 2007 financial year and NZ$45.5 million in the 2008 financial year. The following financial year, NZ$68.5m was contributed to Hanover by entities associated with Watson and Hotchin.

In December 2009 Hanover Group debenture holders, note holders and bond holders voted in favour of swapping their debentures, notes and bonds for shares in Allied Farmers Limited (NZX: ALF). This transaction resulted in ALF assuming the net asset position of the Hanover Group finance companies.

When Hanover collapsed, causing significant losses for many small investors, concerns were raised about Hanover group's true financial position, its solvency when paying dividends, transactions that may have benefited related parties, and the accuracy of asset valuations.

=== Cullen Investments ===
Watson founded Cullen Investments in 1995 and is currently the executive chairman of the international private investment company. The company has interests in the following sectors; fashion retail, financial services, agriculture, real estate and sports and entertainment. The firm's primary focus is development of its international portfolio, which includes interests in the United States, United Kingdom, Australia and New Zealand.

Through the firm, he owned Bendon Group. First launched in New Zealand, the company launched sales channels in Australia, US, UK, Europe and the UAE. The brand included ranges from Elle Macpherson who helped launch the brand into the UK and Europe, and Stella McCartney.

Through the firm, he bought a 75% stake in the New Zealand Warriors in 2000, which competes in the Australasian National Rugby League (NRL) and is New Zealand's largest and highest-profile privately owned sporting franchise. He later reduced his share to 50% while selling off the other half to New Zealand billionaire Owen Glenn. However, in 2015, he increased his share to 100% becoming the sole-owner of the 'Vodafone Warriors' franchise.

The firm has an international property portfolio, including commercial assets and residential development, predominantly in New Zealand, the US and UK.

The Watson Foundation is a charitable trust established by Cullen Investments to enrich the lives of underprivileged children and young people and assist with their needs, including care, support, protection, health and education. The foundation sponsored till about 2011 charities such as The First Tee of New Zealand.

Cullen Investments and many associated NZ companies were placed into liquidation in late 2019 early 2020.

Watson is involved in a long-running legal dispute with Glenn. In connection with this case, in October 2020 Watson was sentenced to four months prison for contempt of court. Liquidators were seeking $57 million from Eric Watson in 2023. In July 2023, the liquidators instructed their solicitors to start bankruptcy proceedings against Eric Watson.

=== Watson Bloodstock ===
Watson Bloodstock had interests in a number of race horses, including winners of Group races such as:

- Little Jamie, winner of the 2000 Manawatu Sires Produce Stakes.
- Maguire, winner of the 2002 Auckland Cup.

=== Long Island Iced Tea Corp ===
The U.S. Securities and Exchange Commission in July 2021 charged Eric Watson and two others with insider trading in relation to Long Island Iced Tea Corp's announcement in December 2017 that it would change its name to Long Blockchain Corp. This change also reflected a change in its focus to blockchain from iced tea and lemonade. As a result its shares soared by nearly 400%.

== Marriage ==
He has one child, Sam Watson, from a relationship before his marriage to Nicky Watson. He was previously married to Nicola Watson, a model now known as Nicola Robinson. He has three young sons by his Swedish partner, model Lisa Henrekson.

== See also ==
- List of NRL club owners
