= Owen Glenn =

Indian-New Zealand businessman and philanthropist

Sir Owen Glenn KNZM
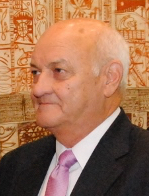
- Glenn in 2013
- Born: Owen George Glenn; 19 February 1940 (age 86); Calcutta, British India
- Citizenship: New Zealander
- Occupations: Businessman and philanthropist

Sir Owen George Glenn KNZM (born 19 February 1940) is a New Zealand expatriate businessman and philanthropist, who supports humanitarian causes worldwide through his family charity.

== Early life ==
Born in Calcutta, British India, on 19 February 1940, Glenn emigrated with his family to New Zealand in 1952. He attended Balmoral Intermediate School and Mount Roskill Grammar School in Auckland. He became a naturalised New Zealand citizen in 1961.

== Career ==
Glenn is the founder and former executive chairman of Vanguard Logistics Services, the USA's largest neutral non-vessel operating common carrier [logistics industry participant] and among the top five largest NVOCCs in the world.

== Philanthropy ==
In 2002, Glenn donated $7.5 million to the University of Auckland for the development of the Business School's premises and facilities and ongoing improvements. This contribution is believed to be the largest private donation in New Zealand educational history, and was driven by Glenn's belief in the business school's mission and in the benefits high quality business education holds for New Zealand business and society. As a result of this gift the business school's complex, opened in early 2008, was named the Owen G. Glenn Building. Owen Glenn followed his initial $7.5 million donation by, in 2008, donating an additional $500,000 to establish the Barry Spicer and Owen G Glenn PhD Scholarships. These scholarships received matched funding of $250,000.

In 2008 Glenn claimed that the New Zealand government was considering making him the country's honorary consul in Monaco, but such an appointment never eventuated. His political donations to the New Zealand Labour Party and New Zealand First, which both the political parties denied receiving, caused some controversy in New Zealand politics at around the same time. On 9 September 2008, Glenn gave evidence to the New Zealand Parliament's Privileges Committee regarding the accuracy of statements made by Winston Peters, Leader of New Zealand First, about the donations Glenn had given to Peters. Parliament ultimately censured Peters for failing to declare the donations.

Glenn supports a number of international charities through the Glenn Family Foundation and helped establish the International SeaKeepers Society. The foundation also supported Hockey NZ, helped it achieve rights to the hosting of the 2011 Champions Trophy, which were taken from India due to organisation failures.

Following the 2011 Christchurch earthquake, Glenn donated $1 million to the Christchurch earthquake recovery fund on behalf of the Glenn Family Foundation. He stated, "I grew up in New Zealand, it holds a special place in my heart and to see such devastation, such hurt and such loss makes you want to help. This donation is something I can do and I strongly urge other expatriate business people to do the same. We all need to pull together and while we are a small country, it is a country made up of people with huge hearts. That's what gets you through in times like this."

Glenn was patron of the Friends of Fiji Heart Foundation.

== New Zealand Warriors involvement ==
In 2000, Glenn became a shareholder of the New Zealand Warriors rugby league team. After his relationship with 50% shareholder Eric Watson became dysfunctional, Glenn first considered putting his shares into a trust for the benefit of New Zealand Warrior fans. However, he ultimately sold his 50% stake to Watson in November 2015.

== Dispute with Eric Watson ==
Between 2012 and 2017, Glenn’s business relationship with high profile NZ businessman Eric Watson soured, particularly in relation to British property investments. Glenn successfully challenged Watson in court and was awarded a comprehensive win with over £129million in damages owed to Glenn. As at December 2019, Watson was struggling to pay compensation and interest. Glenn has said he will pursue former business partner Eric Watson "to the ends of the earth — if necessary taking action against his trusts and third parties holding assets on his behalf — to ensure he pays every penny that is found due."

== Horse racing interests ==
Glenn has had interests in racehorses including Railings, winner of the 2005 Caulfield Cup.

== Honours and awards ==
In the 2008 New Year Honours, Glenn was appointed an Officer of the New Zealand Order of Merit for services to business and the community.

In May 2011, Glenn was awarded CPA Australia's highest honour—Honorary Fellow of CPA (FCPA)—in recognition of his global entrepreneurial success.

In the 2013 New Year Honours, Glenn was promoted to Knight Companion of the New Zealand Order of Merit, for services to philanthropy.

== See also ==
- List of NRL club owners
