= Owen G. Glenn Building =

University of Auckland, New Zealand

Coordinates: 36.853192°S 174.771232°E

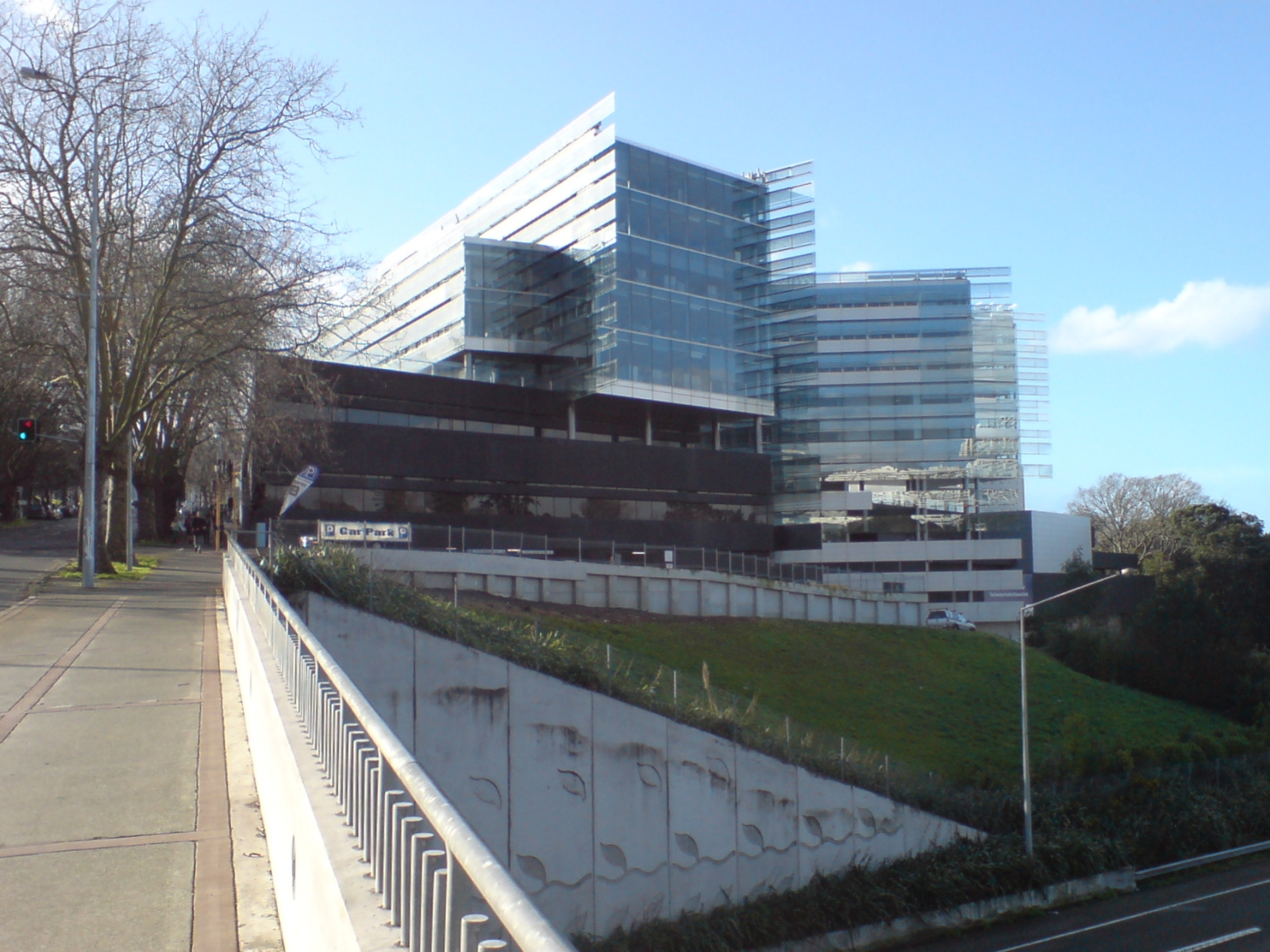

General information
- Completed: 2007
- Opened: 21 February 2008

Design and construction
- Main contractor: Fletcher Construction

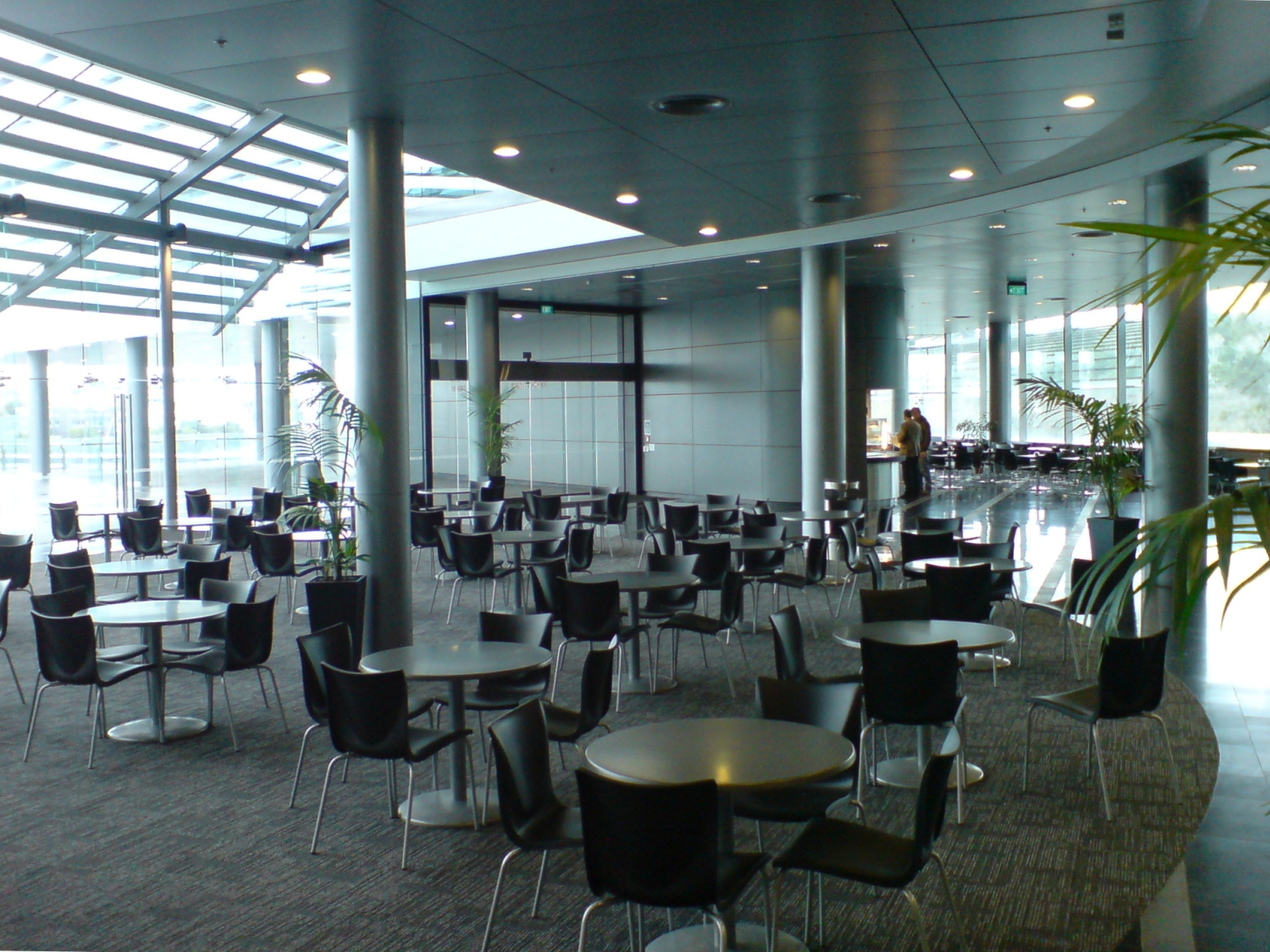
The ASB Atrium, located on the first floor of the building

The Owen G. Glenn Building is the home of the Business School of the University of Auckland, Auckland, New Zealand, completed in late 2007. It is named after Owen G. Glenn ONZM, an expatriate New Zealand businessman who has donated to a number of philanthropic causes, as well as giving NZ$7.5 million to the business school.

The building has 11 levels to serve the teaching and research activities of the school, and has been described as being "a series of layered sinuous blades anchored by a central atrium."

The lowest levels feature teaching, learning and administrative spaces, while the higher floors contain offices for 287 staff, 80% of whom have individual offices. The basement of the building contains 1000 parking spaces.
