= Crown Retail Deposit Guarantee Scheme =

The Crown Retail Deposit Guarantee Scheme was an opt-in deposit insurance scheme, established under the Public Finance Act 1989 in New Zealand during the Great Recession, 2008 to 2011. Dr Michael Cullen, Finance Minister at the time of the scheme's introduction said, "The deposit guarantee is designed to give assurance to New Zealand depositors. The New Zealand banking system remains sound. We want to ensure that ordinary New Zealanders feel that their deposits are safe in the current uncertain international financial market conditions."

The scheme guaranteed that the New Zealand Government would repay those who lost money in failed financial institutions. It was implemented on 12 October 2008, administered by Treasury and the Reserve Bank and at its height resulted in Crown guarantees over $133 billion. Ninety-six institutions were covered by the scheme - 60 non-bank deposit takers, 12 banks and 24 collective investment schemes. All guarantees had ended by December 2011.

== Finance company failures and bailouts ==
Nine finance companies out of the thirty accepted into the scheme collapsed. This resulted in the Crown bailing out investors, paying $2 billion to more than 42,000 depositors. The three largest bailouts were of South Canterbury Finance Limited, Allied Nationwide Finance Limited, Equitable Mortgages Limited.

Bailouts under the scheme
Company name	Entry date in scheme	Failure date	Amount paid out
Allied Nationwide Finance Limited	19 November 2008	20 August 2010	$131.0m
Equitable Mortgages Limited	4 December 2008	26 November 2010	$140.2m
Mascot Finance Limited	12 January 2009	2 March 2009	$70.0m
Mutual Finance Limited	13 November 2008	14 July 2010	$9.2m
Rockforte Finance Limited	20 February 2009	10 May 2010	$4.0m
South Canterbury Finance Limited	19 November 2008	31 August 2010	$1,580.3m
Strata Finance Limited	19 November 2008	31 August 2010	$0.5m
Viaduct Capital Limited	13 November 2008	14 May 2010	$7.6m
Vision Securities Limited	5 December 2008	1 April 2010	$30.0m

== See also ==
- Finance company collapses, 2006-12 (New Zealand)
