= Bridgecorp Holdings =

Bridgecorp Holdings Ltd
- Type: Private
- Predecessor: Bridgevale Mining
- Founded: 1994
- Defunct: 2007
- Fate: Receivership
- Headquarters: Sydney, Australia
- Area served: Australia; New Zealand
- Key people: Rod Petricevic (former CEO); Bruce Davidson (former chairman)
- Services: Property development
- Subsidiaries: Bridgecorp Limited; Bridgecorp Finance Ltd

Bridgecorp Holdings Ltd was a high-risk property development group that was operating in New Zealand and Australia. It was placed in receivership in July 2007.

== History ==
The company was originally listed on the New Zealand stock exchange as Bridgevale Mining and changed its name in 1987, the same year it acquired Toy Warehouse. Bridgecorp Holdings was delisted after the toy company—considered underperforming—was sold in 1992 and went into receivership the same year. Rod Petricevic effectively took control of Bridgecorp after it was delisted. He tried several times to relist the company, but was rejected by the NZX. In 2002, Bridgecorp Holdings was deregistered in New Zealand and moved its headquarters to Sydney, Australia. Bridgecorp Limited served as a subsidiary for New Zealand while Bridgecorp Finance Ltd was established as its Australian arm.

In 2004, Bridgecorp Holdings began trading at Unlisted, a New Zealand-based trading facility. In 2006 the group began reporting the results of the Bridgecorp Limited subsidiary to Unlisted, when it was actually the parent company, Bridgecorp Holdings, whose shares were being traded. In the following three years, the company attracted more than 18,000 investors from both Australia and New Zealand with promised return rates between 9 and 11 per cent a year. In August 2006 Bridgecorp Finance was banned from raising money from existing investors by the Australian Securities and Investments Commission. The commission had issued warnings of "solvency issues" concerning the group as early as December 2005.

== Receivership ==
Bridgecorp collapsed in 2007 with most of the Bridgeport companies being placed in receivership afterwards. At this time the company owed 14,500 investors A$467 million. Graham Miller of the Covenant Trustee Company was appointed trustee for the group following its collapse.

Rod Petricevic, former chairman Bruce Davidson, Rob Roest, Gary Urwin and Peter Steigrad were charged in July 2007 after Bridgecorp went into receivership. Petricevic sought legal aid to pay for his legal bills, but it was denied on the grounds that he remained a trustee of a family trust with access to considerable wealth. On 5 April 2012 Petricevic, Roest and Steigrad were found guilty of making untrue statements in their investment prospectuses. Urwin and Davidson had earlier pleaded guilty to all charges.

On 17 April 2012 Gary Urwin was sentenced to two years in jail. Although Urwin had asked for sentence of home detention, Justice Pamela Andrews said this would not be appropriate.

On 26 April 2012, Petricevic was sentenced to 6 1/2 years in jail by Justice Venning. His lawyer, Charles Cato, had argued for a lower sentence due to Petricevic's age and the effect the trial and conviction had had on his family. Justice Venning dismissed the request stating that he was not convinced the remorse shown by Petricevic was genuine.

On 18 May 2012, Rob Roest was also sentenced to 6 1/2 years in jail by Justice Venning. His lawyer, Paul Dacre, had asked Justice Venning for a lower sentence than Petricevic's due to undisclosed family issues and the fact Petricevic was the ultimate "boss" of Bridgecorp. This was again denied with the judge stating that Roest had not shown proper remorse. On the same day Peter Stiegrad was sentenced to nine months' home detention, ordered to complete 200 hours of community services and pay $350,000 in reparation.

In October 2012 receiver PwC filed a civil action in the High Court at Auckland for $442 million against three of the former directors for "breach of directors' duty". Rod Petricevic, Rob Roest, Peter Steigrad, Gary Urwin and Bruce Davidson were named in the suit. As Petricevic and Roest have been declared bankrupt, they are exempt from the legal proceedings. This is one of the largest civil claims in New Zealand history.

== See also ==
- Finance company collapses, 2006–2012 (New Zealand)
