= List of Western Australian locomotive classes =

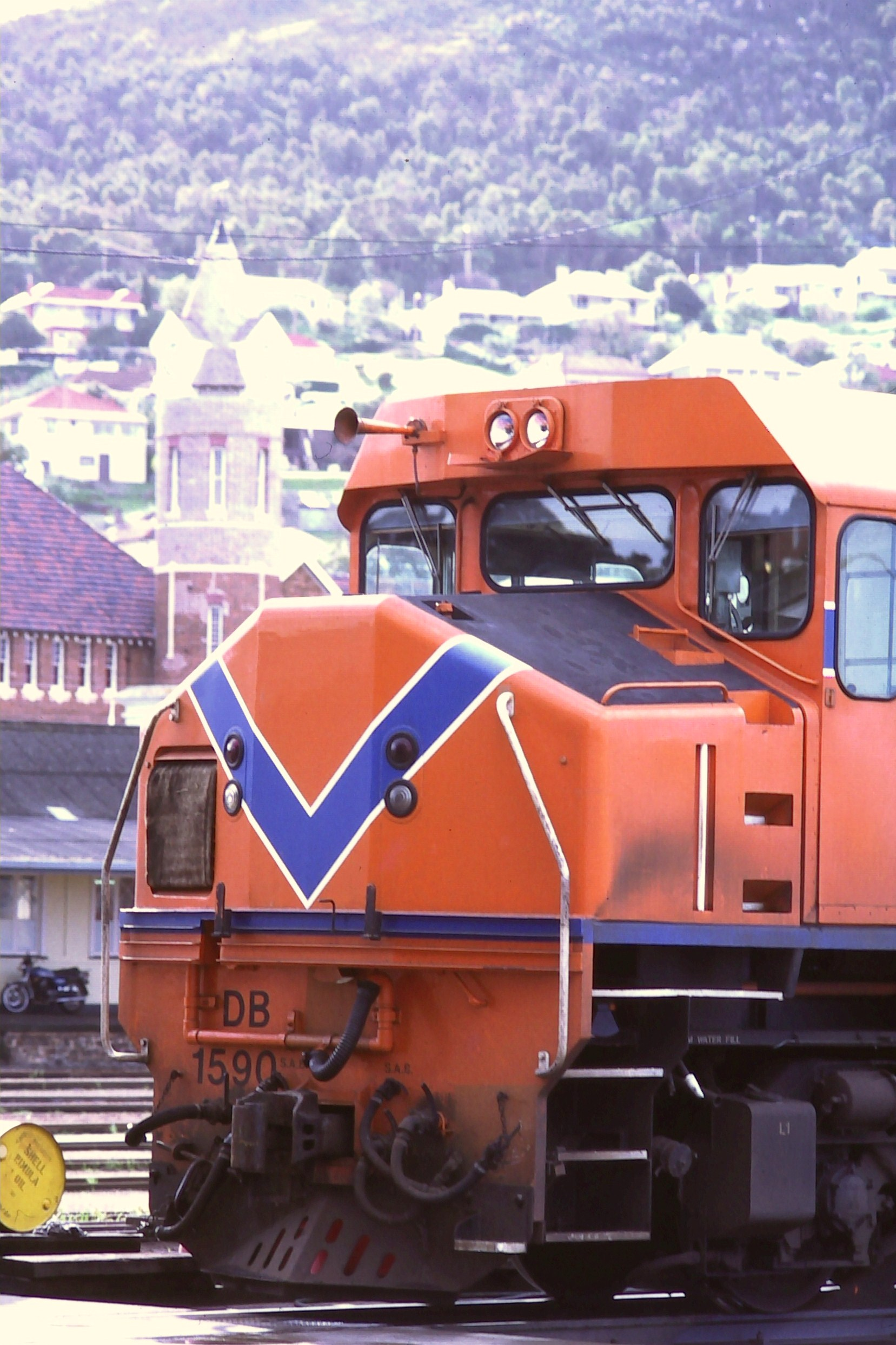
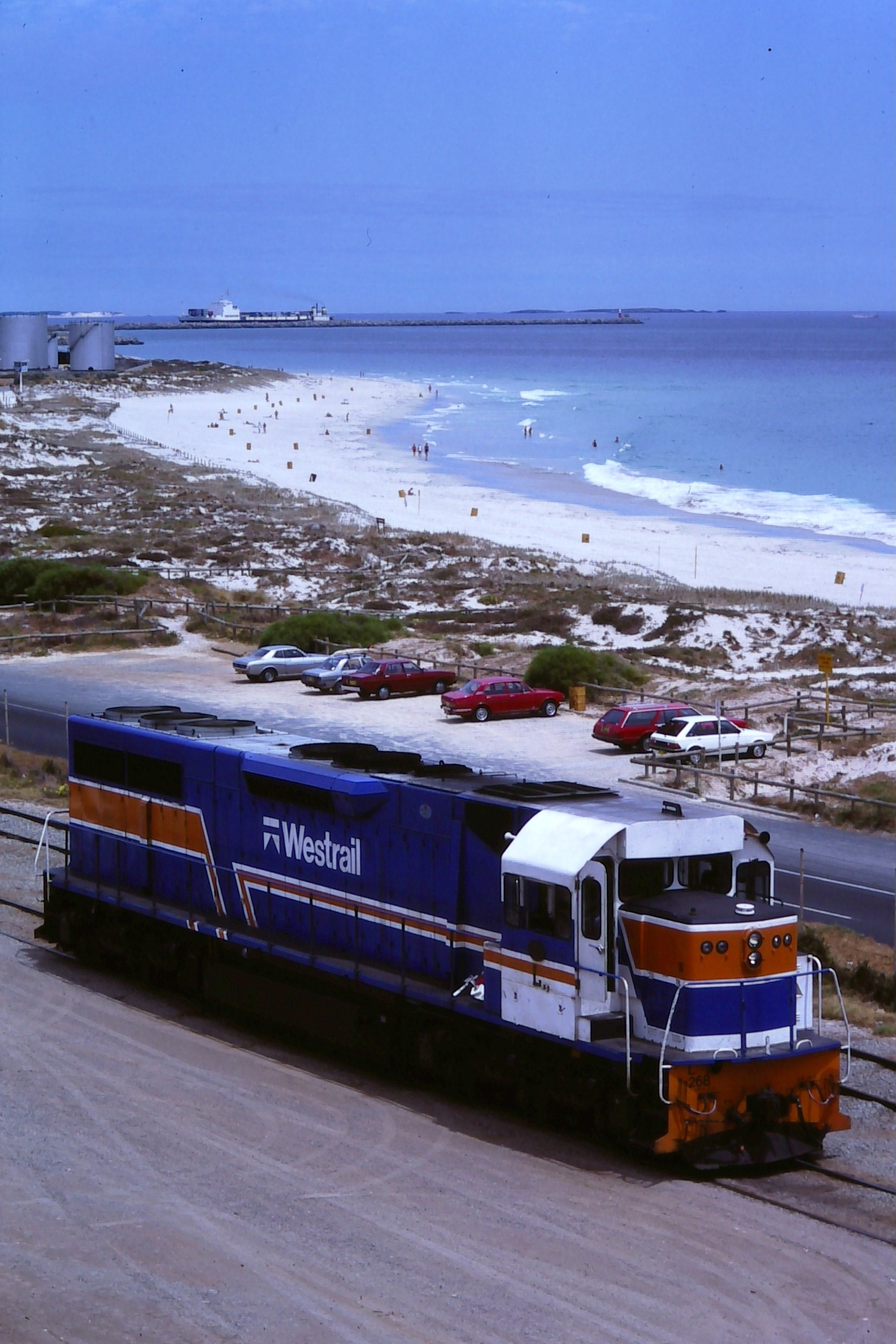
Left: 3 ft 6 in (1,067 mm) DB1590 Shire of Collie, in Westrail orange and blue livery, at Albany, 1986
Right: Standard gauge L268 in its unique experimental Westrail blue livery, at Leighton marshalling yard, 1986

This is a list of Western Australian locomotive classes, being classes of locomotive that have worked on railways in Western Australia.

The majority of Western Australian steam locomotive classes were operated by the Western Australian Government Railways (WAGR). Regularly scheduled steam working ceased on WAGR mainline operations after 1971 - with only special excursion or enthusiasts trains being hauled by steam after that time.

Other significant operators include the Commonwealth Railways, the Midland Railway Company of Western Australia and State Saw Mills. Many private organisations also operated steam locomotives in Western Australia.

== Locomotives ==
=== Western Australian Government Railway ===
WAGR class	Wheel arrangement	Fleet number(s)	Manufacturer Serial numbers	Year introduced	Quantity built	Quantity preserved	Year(s) withdrawn	Comments
==== Tender Locomotives ====
A	2-6-0	3–5, 10–11, 15–16, 21, 31	Beyer, Peacock & Company	1883	14	2		
C	4-6-0	264–275	Baldwin; 20152-20174	1902	20	0		
Ca	4-6-2	431–440	Midland Workshops	1915	20	0		
E/Es	4-6-2	291–355	Nasmyth, Wilson & Company (15), Vulcan Foundry (30), North British Locomotive Company (20)	1902	65	1		
Ec	4-6-2	236–255	Baldwin; 18826-18866	1901	20	0		Rebuilt as L class in 1924
F/Fs	4-8-0	276–290, 356-367, 394–423	Dübs & Company (15); 4023-4037 North British Locomotive Company (42); 19655-19666, 20083-20112	1902	57	2		
G	2-6-0/4-6-0	17, 32–33, 42–49, 51–61, 64–68, 109–112, 126–132, 156–161, 233–235 (2-6-0) 48–50, 107–198, 111–125, 133–137 (4-6-0)	Beyer, Peacock & Company (7), James Martin & Co (29); Neilson & Company (12)	1889	72	7		Based on 1888 locomotive design "Silver King"
J	4-6-0	28–30	Kitson & Company; 3396-3398	1891	3	0		
L	4-6-2	236–255 (1st), 471–490 (2nd)	Midland Workshops	1924	20	0		Major rebuild from Ec class
M	2-6-0	23–24	Kitson & Company; 2035-|2036	1876	2	0		
O	2-8-0T&T	74–100, 208–226	Dübs & Company (36); 4932-5067, 5188-5196 Neilson & Company (10); 3584-3593	1896	46	0		5 rebuilt as Oa, 10 rebuilt as N
Oa	2-8-0T&T	2, 5–6, 24, 33, 158–161, 219 (1st), 171–179 (2nd)	Midland Railway Workshops	1909	10	1		5 built new, 5 rebuilt from O
P (1896)	4-4-0	62–63	James Martin & Co; 134–135	1896	2	0	1912/1929	Sold to Midland Railway of Western Australia in 1912.
P	4-6-2	441–465 (1st), 501–517 (2nd)	North British Locomotive Company (10); 23143-23152 Midland Workshops (15)	1924	25	1	1968–69	8 rebuilt to Pr class
Pr	4-6-2	138–147, 453–464(1st), 521–538 (2nd)	Midland Workshops	1938	10 (new), 8 (r/b P)	1	1967–70	
Pm and Pmr	4-6-2	701–735	North British Locomotive Company; 26545-26930	1949	35	6		Final 16 constructed as Pmr with detail improvements
Q	4-6-0	62–63	Andrew Barclay Sons & Co; 1947-1947		2	0		Originally built for Public Works Department. To WAGR 1931.
R/Ra	4-4-0/4-4-2	144–155, 174–179, 227–232	Dübs & Company; 3431-3442, 3674-3677, 3679-3682	1897	24	1		
S	4-8-2	541–550	Midland Workshops	1943	10	3	1971–72	Superheated
T	4-4-0	164–173	Beyer, Peacock & Company (6); 2811-2816 Kitson & Company (4); 3106-3109	1887	10	0		Ex Great Southern Railway
U	4-6-2	651–664	North British Locomotive Company; 24854-24841	1947	14	1		Superheated, oil burner
V	2-8-2	1201–1224	Beyer, Peacock & Company; 7770-7793	1955	24	4		Superheated
W	4-8-2	901–960	Beyer, Peacock & Company; 7378-7417, 7453-7472	1951	60	14		Superheated
==== Garratt locomotives ====
ASG	4-8-2+2-8-4	10, 20, 26-32, 44-50, 54-59, 63–65	Midland Railway Workshops (10), Islington Railway Workshops (3), Newport Workshops (3), Clyde Engineering (9); 480-485, 489-491	1942	25	0		
M	2-6-0+0-6-2	388–393	Beyer, Peacock & Company; 5477–5482	1911	6	0		1 example rebuilt to Ms
Ms	2-6-0+0-6-2	424–430	Beyer, Peacock & Company; 5665–5671	1913	7	0		Superheated
Msa	2-6-0+0-6-2	466–475 (1st), 491–500 (2nd)	Midland Workshops; 46–55	1930	10	0		Superheated
==== Tank locomotives ====
B	4-6-0T	8–9, 12–14, 180–185	Kitson & Co (8); 2591-2592, 3780-3785 Dübs & Co (3); 2153, 2185-2186	1884	11	0		
C (1881)	0-6-0ST	1–2	Robert Stephenson and Company; 2390-2391	1881	2	1		later 0-6-0T&T
D (1884)	0-4-0ST	6	Hunslet Engine Company; 331	1884	1	0		
D/Ds	4-6-4T	368–387	North British Locomotive Company; 19709-19728	1912	20	0		
Dm	4-6-4T	581–588	Midland Workshops	1945	6	0		
Dd	4-6-4T	591–600	Midland Workshops	1946	10	2		Superheated
E	2-4-4-2T Double Fairlie	7, 20	Avonside Engine Company; 1239–1242	1879	2	0		
F (1892)	2-4-0T	20	Fremantle Workshops	1892	1	0		rebuilt from class E (1879)
H	0-6-0T	18, 22	Neilson & Co; 3630-3631	1887	2	1		
I	0-6-4T Single Fairlie	25–27	Avonside Engine Company; 1281, 1283, 1285	1891	3	0		Ex-New Zealand Government Railways S class
K (1891)	0-6-2T	19	Hudswell, Clarke & Co; 387	1891	1	0		
K	2-8-4T	34–41, 101–106, 186–195	Neilson & Co; 4599-4606, 5040-5045, 5197-5206	1893	24	0		
N	4-4-4T	1, 19–20, 25–27, 69–79, 85–87, 95–96, 132, 196–207, 256–263	Nasmyth, Wilson & Co; 600-614 Neilson & Co; 4933-4941, 5046, 5052-5054, 5062-5063 Robert Stephenson & Co; 2881-2892	1895	42	1		
Q/Qa (1895)	4-6-2T/4-6-4T	138–143	R&W Hawthorn Leslie & Co; 2312-2313, 2351-2354	1895	6	0		
S (1888)	0-6-0WT	162–163	Kitson & Co; T231, T260	1888	2	0		Ex Great Southern Railway
U (1903)	0-6-0CT	7	Vulcan Foundry; 1897	1903	1	0		steam crane tank locomotive
Ut	4-6-4T	664	Midland Workshops	1957	1	1		Converted from U class
==== Standard Gauge Diesel Locomotives ====
H	Bo-Bo	H1-H5	English Electric A.081-A.082, A.085-A.087	1965	5	0	1992-1996	3 in service, 1 stored, 1 scrapped.
J	Bo-Bo	J101-J105	Clyde Engineering 66–479 to 66–483	1966	5	0	1986-1995	Evolution of the Victorian Railways Y class. 4 in service, 1 scrapped.
K	Co-Co	K201-K210	English Electric A.109-A.111, A.133-A.137, A.142, A.186	1966	10	0	1992-2000	1 in service, 2 stored, 7 scrapped.
L	Co-Co	L251-L277	Clyde Engineering	1967	27	0	1973-2000	1 in service, 18 stored, 8 scrapped.
NB	Co-Co	N1871-N1881	Commonwealth Engineering	1977	11	0	1994-1997	1 stored, 10 scrapped.
Q	Co-Co	Q4001-Q4019	Clyde Engineering Downer Rail	1996	19	0	2000	All in service
==== Narrow Gauge Diesel Locomotives ====
X	2'Do2'	X1001-X1032 XA140l-XA1416	Beyer, Peacock & Company Metropolitan-Vickers	1954	48	6	1984-1988	
Y	Bo-Bo	Y1101-Y1118	British Thomson-Houston 1011-1028	1953	18	7	1984-1986	
Z	C'	Z1151-Z1153	Robert Stephenson & Hawthorns 7736-7738 Drewry Car Company 2401-2403	1953	3	3	1983	
A	Co-Co	A1501-A1514	Clyde Engineering Commonwealth Engineering	1960	14	2	1998-2000	13 in service, 2 preserved, 1 stored, 3 unknown, 6 scrapped.
AA	Co-Co	AA1515-AA1519	Clyde Engineering Commonwealth Engineering	1969	5	0	1998-2000	
AB	Co-Co	AB1531-AA1536	Clyde Engineering Commonwealth Engineering	1969	6	1	1998-2000	
B	C	B1601-B1610	Commonwealth Engineering	1962	10	10	1984	
C	Co-Co	C1701-C1703	English Electric	1962	3	3	1992	
T/TA	Co	T1801-1805 TA1806-1815	Tulloch Limited	1967	15	4	1 still in use	1 in service, 4 preserved, 11 scrapped
R	Co-Co	R1901-R1905	English Electric A.166-A.167, A.171, A.173-A.174	1968	5	0	1992-2016	All scrapped.
RA	Co-Co	RA1906-RA1918	English Electric A.202-A.207, A.218-A.222, A.244, A.248	1969	13	1	1992	12 scrapped.
D/DA	Co-Co	D1561-D1565 DA1571-DA1577	Commonwealth Engineering	1977	12	0		
N/NA	Co-Co	N1871-N1881	Commonwealth Engineering	1977	11	0	1994-1997	1 stored, 10 scrapped.
DB	Co-Co	DB1581–DB1593 DBZ2301–DBZ2313	Clyde Engineering 81–989 to 81–998 82–1122 to 82–1124	1982	13	0	2000	6 in service, 7 in storage.
P	Co-Co	P2501–P2517	UGL Rail	1989	17	0	2000	All 17 in service.
S	Co-Co	S3301–S3311	Clyde Engineering	1998	11	0	2000	All 11 in service.

=== Midland Railway Company of Western Australia ===
(In order of introduction on the Midland railway.)

MRWA class	Wheel arrangement	Fleet number(s)	Manufacturer Serial numbers	Year introduced MRWA	Quantity built	Quantity preserved	Year(s) withdrawn	Comments
==== Steam locomotives ====
-	2-6-2	1	Hawthorn Leslie; 2062	1895	1	0	1901	Ex Edward Keane (in service 1888). Named Walkaway. Sold to WA Goldfields Firewood Supply Ltd.
-	0-6-0T	11, 12	Hudswell Clarke; 381–382	1895	2	0	1901–1920	Ex Edward Keane (in service 1891). Named Fremantle (sold 1920) and Geraldton (sold 1901).
B	4-4-0	B2–B10	Hawthorn Leslie; 2213–2221	1895	9	1	1929–1950s	Known as T class until 1921. B6 preserved, others sold for scrap.
-	2-6-0	-	James Martin & Co; 14 (2nd), 19	1895	2	0	1895	Ex Edward Keane (in service 1891). Both sold to WAGR.
P	4-4-0	P62, P63/P12	James Martin & Co; 134–135	1912	2	0	1929	Ex WAGR (in service 1896). Both sold for scrap.
C	4-6-2	C14–C18	Kitson & Company; 4878–4880, 4884–4885	1912	5	0	1954–1963	All sold for scrap.
D	4-8-0	D19–D20	Baldwin; 53001–53002	1920	2	0	1963	Both sold for scrap.
A	2-8-2	A21–A29	Kitson & Company; 5397–5399, 5409–5411, 5429–5431	1926	9	0	1957–1958	All sold for scrap.
==== Narrow Gauge Diesel Locomotives ====
E	0-6-0	E30	Commonwealth Engineering	1957	1	1	1983	MRWA's only Western Australian built locomotive
F	A1A-A1A	F40-F46	English Electric	1958	7	4	1984-1985	Hotham Valley Railway have preserved F40 and F44 while Rail Heritage WA have F43. F41 is also on display at Moora.
G	Co-Co	G50-G51	English Electric	1963	2	1	1990-1991	Based upon the British Rail Class 20

=== Commonwealth Railways ===
CR class	Wheel arrangement	Fleet number(s)	Manufacturer Serial numbers	Year introduced	Quantity built	Quantity preserved	Year(s) withdrawn	Comments
==== Standard Gauge Steam Locomotives ====
C	4-6-0	C62–C69	Walkers Limited	1938	8	0	1952–1956	Based on NSWGR C36 class
CA	4-6-0	CA78–CA79	Baldwin	1943	2	0	1945, 1950	Ex New York, New Haven & Hartford Railroad
CN	4-6-0	CA70–CA77	MLW	1942	8	0	1949–1952	Ex Canadian National
D	4-6-0	D156–D163	Beyer, Peacock & Company	1913	6	0	1920s, 1943	Ex NSWGR Q class
F	2-6-0	F55	Baldwin	1915	1	0	1921	Ex NSWGR K class.
G/GA	4-6-0	G1–G/GA26	Clyde EngineeringBaldwin/Toowoomba Foundry	1914	26	1	1925–1956	Based on NSWGR P class
K	2-8-0	K27–K34	North British Locomotive Company	1916	8	0	1943–1952	Based on NSWGR T class
KA	2-8-0	KA35–KA54 KA56–KA61	Walkers Limited/Perry Engineering	1919	26	0	1925–1952	Based on NSWGR TF class.
L	2-8-2	L80–L89	Clyde Engineering	1952	10	0	1959	Originally built for China based on SAR 700 class.
Loco Crane No.1	0-4-0	-	Hudswell Clarke	1913	1	0	1953	Allocated to the WA Division.
==== Standard Gauge Diesel Locomotives ====
GM	A1A-A1A/Co-Co	GM1-GM47	Clyde Engineering	1951	47	3	1988	4 in service, 3 preserved, 14 stored, 26 scrapped.
MDH	Co-Co	MDH1-MDH6	Clyde Engineering	1958	6	0	1969-1971	MDH1 named F. J. Shea
CL	Co-Co	CL1-CL17	Clyde Engineering	1970	17	1	1997	5 in service, 7 stored, 1 preserved, 2 Overhaul.

== Other Diesel locomotives ==
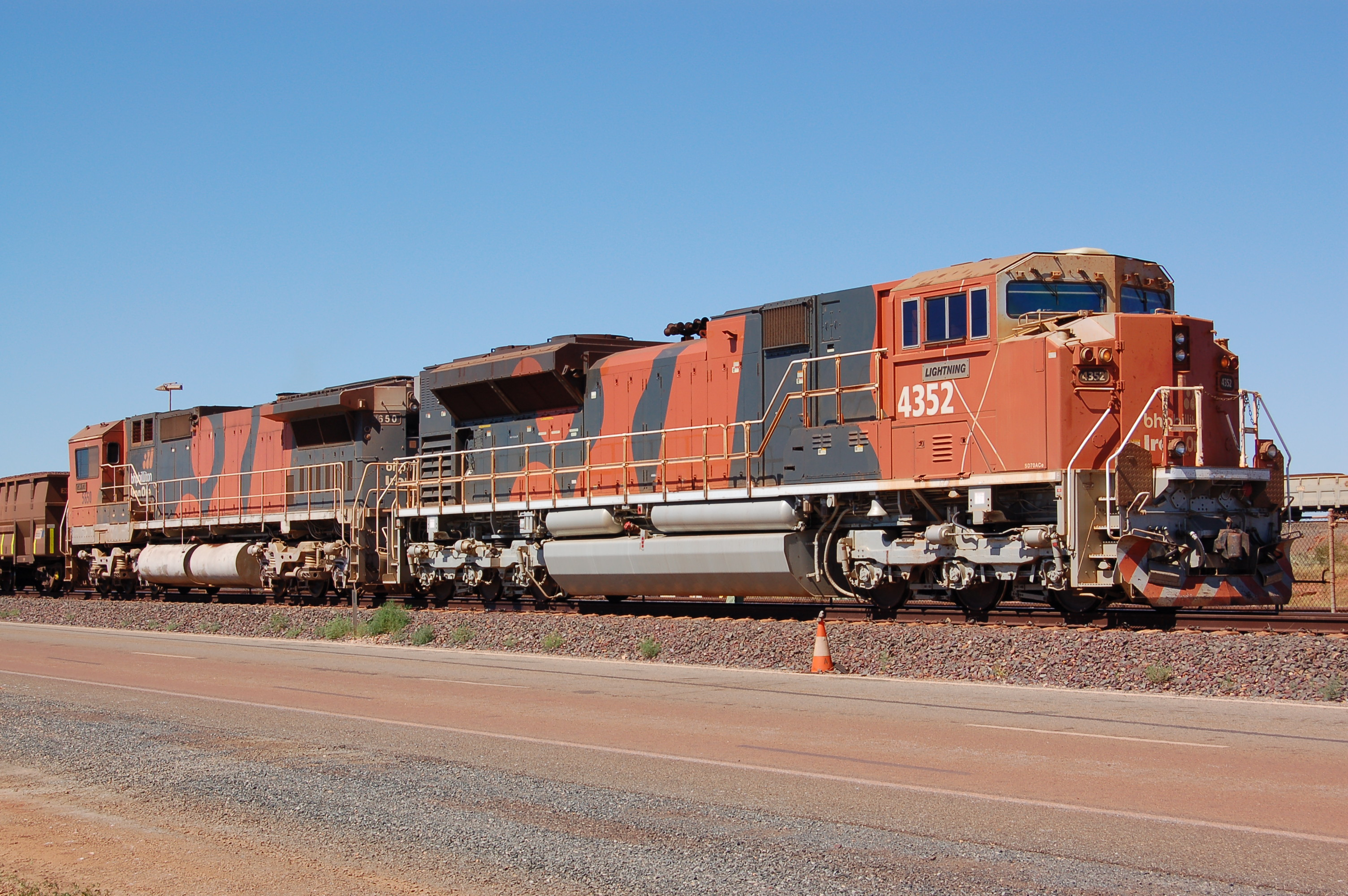
BHP Billiton Iron Ore GE CM40-8M no. 5650 Yawata (left) and EMD SD70ACe no. 4352 Lightning (right) at Boodarie, near Port Hedland, 2012.

=== BHP ===
(In order of introduction on the Goldsworthy and Mount Newman railways.)

- CM39-8
- CM40-8M
- CM40-8
- GE AC6000CW
- EMD SD40R
- EMD SD40-2
- EMD SD70ACe
- FXH70C

=== Cliffs Robe River Iron Associates ===
(In order of introduction on the Robe River railway.)

- ALCO RSC-3 (ex NSWGR 40 class)
- MLW M-636
- ALCO Century 630

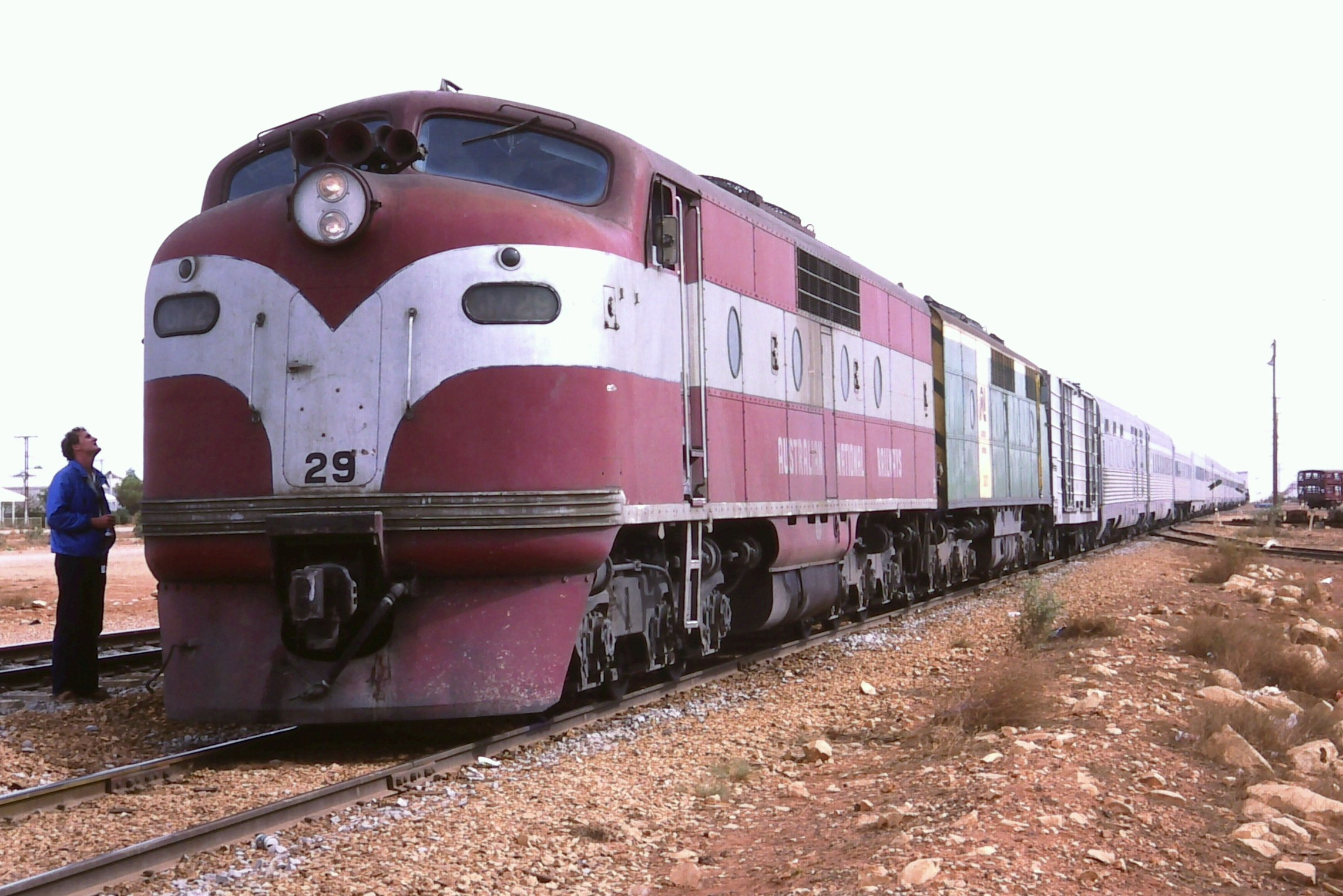
Australian National's GM29 & GM3 with the Trans Australian at Rawlinna in 1986

=== Australian National ===
(In order of introduction on the Trans-Australian Railway.)

- AL/ALF class
- BL class
- DL class
- EL class
- AN class

=== CBH Group ===
- CBH class
- CBH Group 200 Class

=== Fortescue Metals Group ===
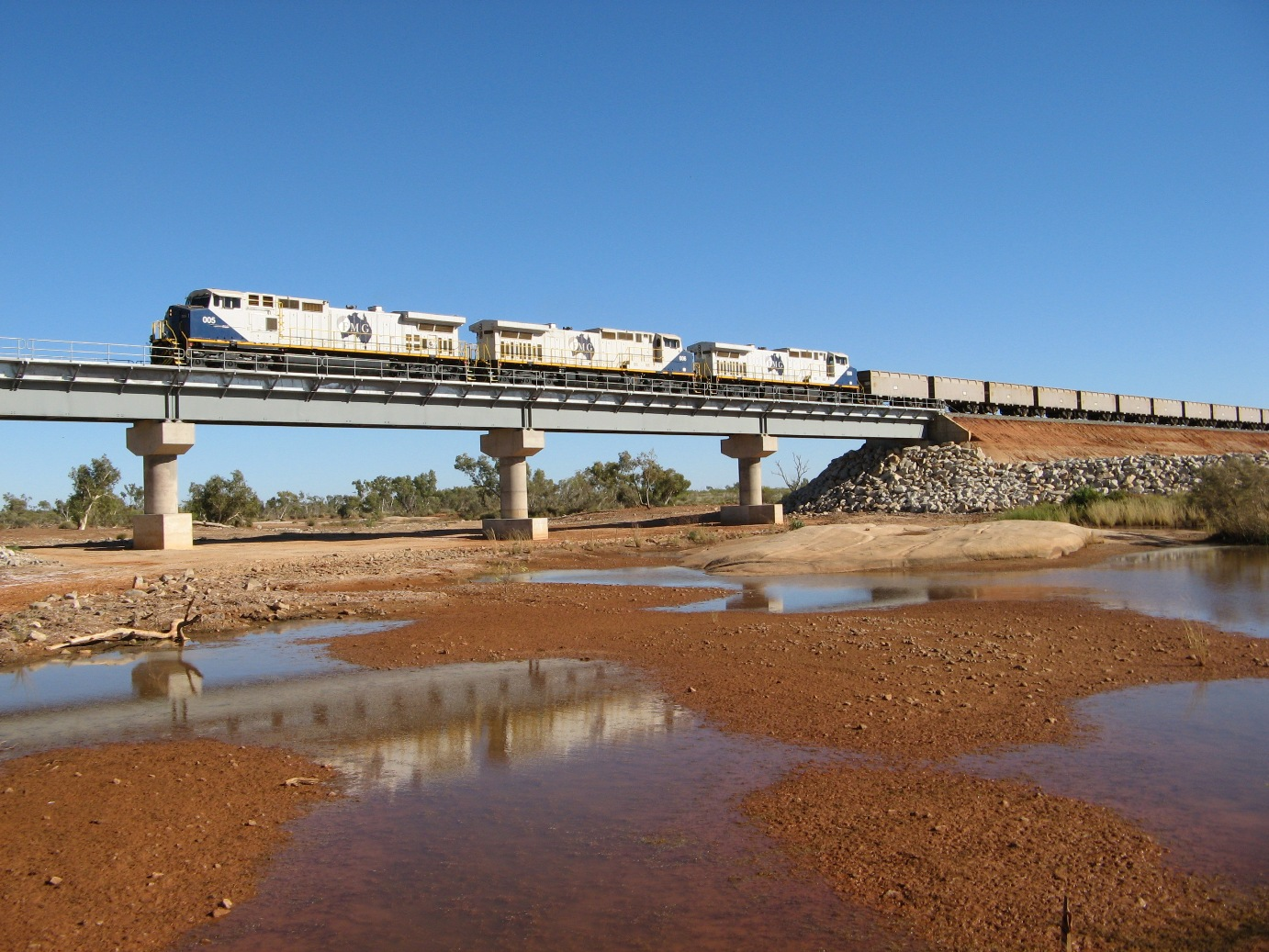
A trio of FMG GE Dash 9-44CWs cross the Turner River with a train of empty ore wagons, 2008.

(In order of introduction on the Fortescue railway.)

- GE Dash 9-44CW
- EMD SD90MAC-H
- EMD SD9043MAC
- EMD SD70ACe
- GE AC44C6M
- SD70J-BB

=== Goldsworthy Mining ===
(In order of introduction on the Goldsworthy railway.)

- Class B (similar to WAGR H class)
- Class A (similar to WAGR K class)
- JT42C GML10

=== Hamersley Iron ===
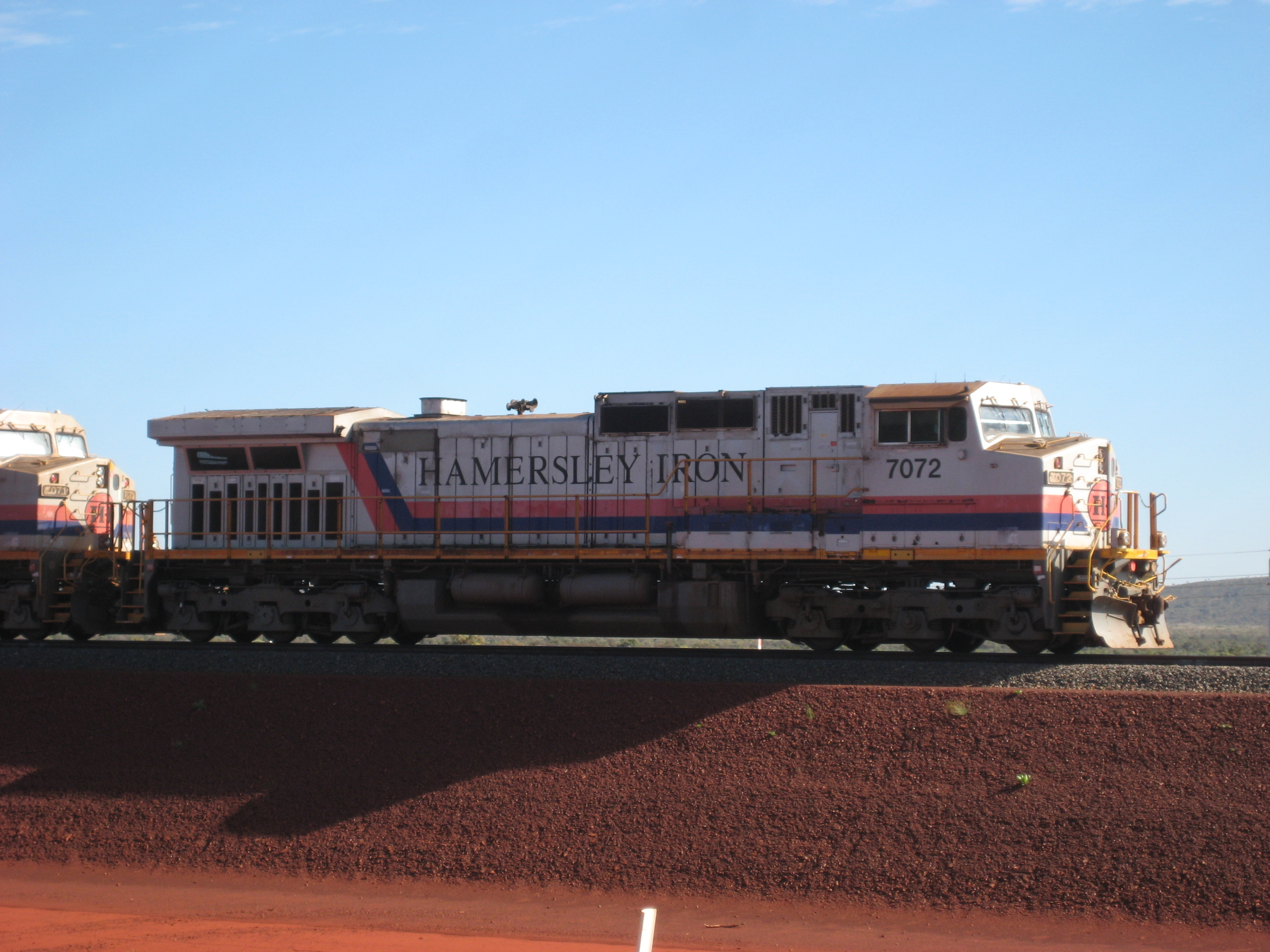
A GE Dash 9-44CW in HI livery at the Brockman 4 mine, 2011.

(In order of introduction on the Hamersley railway.)

- ALCO S-2
- ALCO Century 628
- ALCO Century 415
- ALCO Century 636
- MLW M-636
- GE C36-7
- EMD SD50S
- GE Dash 9-44CW

=== Lakewood Firewood Co ===
- LFC 1

=== Mineral Resources ===
- MRL class

=== Mount Newman Mining ===
(In order of introduction on the Mount Newman railway.)

- EMD F7A
- ALCO Century 636
- MLW M-636
- C36-7M
- CM39-8

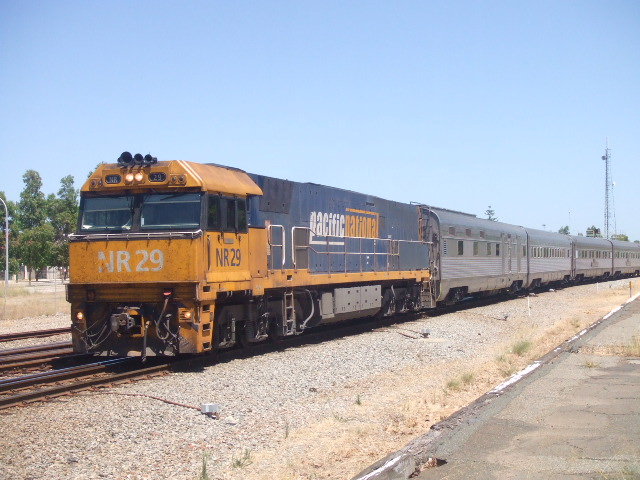
NR29 in Pacific National livery, 2008.

=== Pacific National ===
- AN class
- BL class
- DL class
- G class
- NR class
- XRB class
- 80 class
- 81 class

=== Pilbara Iron ===
- GE Dash 9-44CW

=== SCT Logistics ===
- SCT class
- CSR class

=== South Spur Rail Services ===
- D47, D48, D49, D51
- F40
- K205, K206, K210
- KA212
- NA1874
- R1902
- ZB2120, ZB2125, ZB2129
- 602, 603, 607

=== Watco Australia ===
- G class
- FL/HL class
- DR class

== See also ==
- Locomotives of the Western Australian Government Railways
- List of Australian diesel locomotives
- List of Victorian locomotive classes
- NSWGR steam locomotive classification
- Queensland Railways steam locomotive classification
- Rail transport in Western Australia
