= Western Australian Government Railway C class =

Western Australian Government Railway C class may refer to one of the following locomotives:

- WAGR C class (1880)
- WAGR C class
- WAGR C class (diesel)
