= WAGR N class =

Class of Australian 4-4-4T locomotives

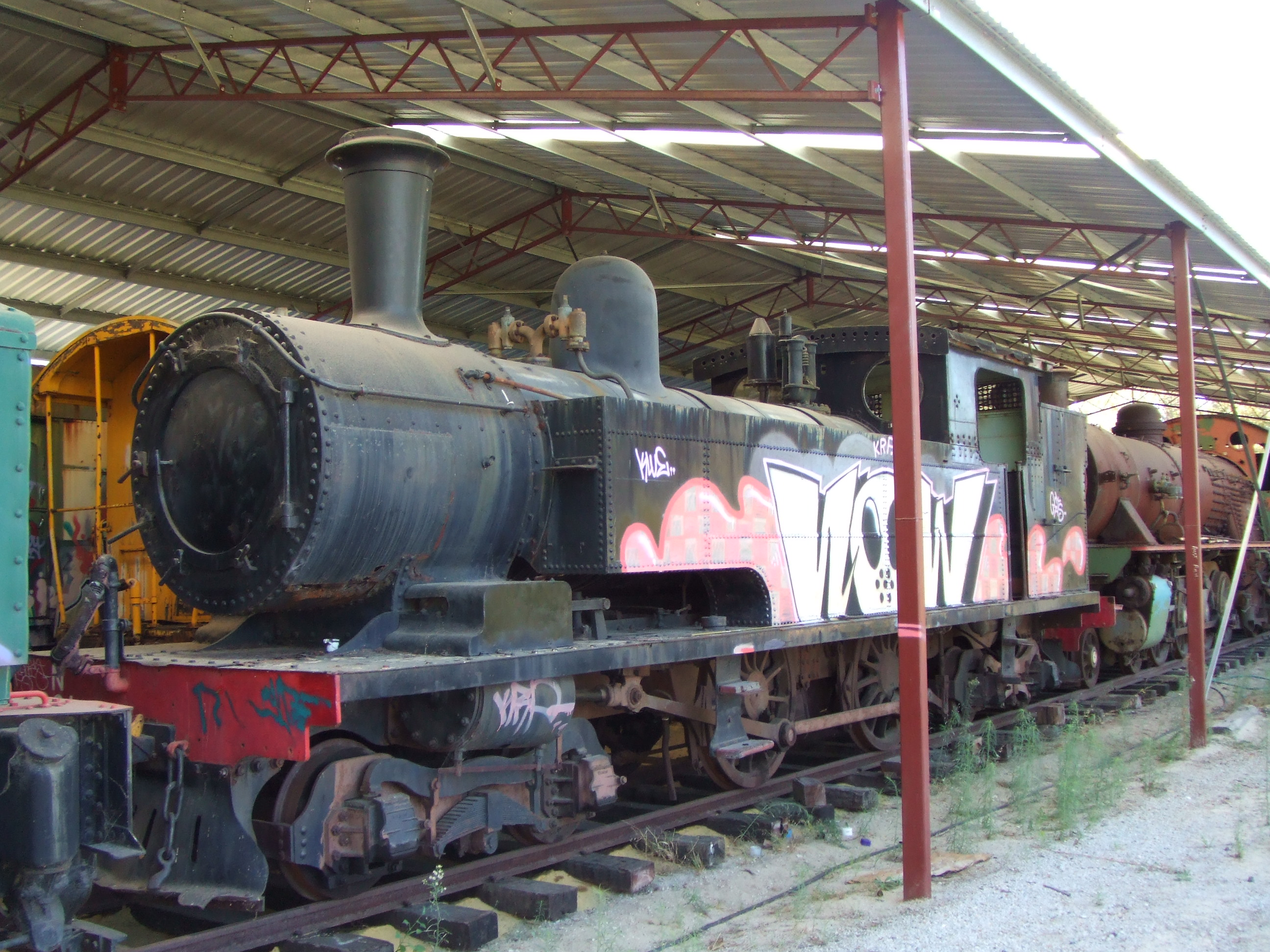
- N201 at the Western Australian Rail Transport Museum
Type and origin
- Power type: Steam
- Builder: Neilson & Co; Robert Stephenson & Co; Nasmyth, Wilson & Co; Midland Railway Workshops
- Total produced: 42
Specifications
- Configuration
  - Whyte: 4-4-4T
- Gauge: 3 ft 6 in (1,067 mm)
- Driver dia.: 4 ft 0 in (1,219 mm)
- Length: 36 ft 3 in (11.05 m)
- Loco weight: 44 long tons 0 cwt (98,600 lb or 44.7 t)
- Fuel type: Coal
- Water cap.: 1,600 imp gal (7,300 L; 1,900 US gal)
- Boiler pressure: 160 lbf/in^{2} (1.10 MPa)
- Cylinder size: 15.5 in × 21 in (394 mm × 533 mm)
Performance figures
- Tractive effort: 11,036 lbf (49.09 kN)
Career
- Operators: Western Australian Government Railways
- First run: September 1896
- Preserved: N201
- Disposition: 1 preserved, 41 scrapped

The WAGR N class was a class of steam locomotives operated by the Western Australian Government Railways (WAGR) from 1896 until 1960.

== History ==
In September 1896, five Neilson & Co built N class entered service hauling suburban trains around Perth between Fremantle and Midland Junction and on the Kalgoorlie-Boulder loop. Robert Stephenson & Co built a further twelve in 1898/99 and Nasmyth, Wilson & Co a further fifteen in 1901. In 1907/08 a further ten were added, when the Midland Railway Workshops converted ten O class. With the cessation of suburban services in Kalgoorlie, all were transferred to Perth.

Most remained in service until replaced by Dm and Dd class locomotives in the 1940s and ADH class diesel multiple units in the 1950s. The last two were withdrawn in September 1960.

N201 has been preserved at the Western Australian Rail Transport Museum.

== Class list ==
The numbers and periods in service of each member of the N class were as follows:

Builder's number	Builder	Year built	Road number	In service	Withdrawn	Notes
600	Nasmyth, Wilson & Co	1900	1	26 June 1901	29 May 1958	
601	Nasmyth, Wilson & Co	1900	19	2 July 1901	15 June 1940	Stowed 20 April 1940
602	Nasmyth, Wilson & Co	1900	20	23 August 1901	30 September 1940	
603	Nasmyth, Wilson & Co	1900	25	16 August 1901	30 April 1954	
604	Nasmyth, Wilson & Co	1900	26	21 August 1901	3 July 1953	
605	Nasmyth, Wilson & Co	1900	27	29 August 1901	2 October 1953	
606	Nasmyth, Wilson & Co	1900	132	2 September 1901	26 May 1953	
4937	Neilson & Co	1896	69	18 September 1896	15 November 1950	
4938	Neilson & Co	1896	70	12 September 1896	14 January 1954	
4939	Neilson & Co	1896	71	19 September 1896	15 May 1950	
4940	Neilson & Co	1896	72	14 September 1896	14 November 1946	
4941	Neilson & Co	1896	73	10 October 1896	25 May 1955	
4933	Neilson & Co	1896	75	27 June 1908	16 January 1951	
4934	Neilson & Co	1896	76	2 May 1908	18 February 1960	
4935	Neilson & Co	1896	77	16 May 1908	7 May 1958	
4936	Neilson & Co	1896	78	27 June 1908	25 May 1955	
5046	Neilson & Co	1896	79	13 June 1908	17 August 1951	
5052	Neilson & Co	1896	85	21 December 1907	22 July 1955	
5053	Neilson & Co	1896	86	21 December 1907	15 May 1950	
5054	Neilson & Co	1896	87	21 December 1907	7 October 1947	Destroyed in collision at Fremantle, 31 July 1947
5062	Neilson & Co	1896	95	15 February 1908	28 June 1955	Used after withdrawal as steam cleaner, Midland locomotive depot
5063	Neilson & Co	1896	96	21 March 1908	19 January 1948	For light rail use, as of 24 May 1913
2881	Robert Stephenson & Co	1898	196	30 September 1898	3 July 1953	
2882	Robert Stephenson & Co	1898	197	27 September 1898	13 January 1955	
2883	Robert Stephenson & Co	1898	198	4 November 1898	28 June 1954	
2884	Robert Stephenson & Co	1898	199	2 November 1898	25 May 1950	Written off after damage in a collision
2885	Robert Stephenson & Co	1898	200	20 October 1898	28 September 1960	Stowed 14 January 1932 to 15 November 1938
2886	Robert Stephenson & Co	1898	201	27 October 1898	28 September 1960	Preserved at Western Australian Rail Transport Museum
2887	Robert Stephenson & Co	1898	202	7 December 1898	14 November 1946	
2888	Robert Stephenson & Co	1898	203	15 December 1898	13 January 1955	
2889	Robert Stephenson & Co	1898	204	28 January 1899	17 April 1950	
2890	Robert Stephenson & Co	1898	205	19 January 1899	12 April 1951	
2891	Robert Stephenson & Co	1898	206	18 January 1899	28 April 1955	
2892	Robert Stephenson & Co	1898	207	11 April 1899	29 May 1953	
607	Nasmyth, Wilson & Co	1900	256	31 August 1901	31 December 1941	Stowed November 1933; boiler removed 7 February 1934
608	Nasmyth, Wilson & Co	1900	257	6 September 1901	4 September 1947	
609	Nasmyth, Wilson & Co	1900	258	12 October 1901	4 November 1947	
610	Nasmyth, Wilson & Co	1900	259	10 October 1901	2 September 1953	
611	Nasmyth, Wilson & Co	1900	260	12 October 1901	15 May 1950	
612	Nasmyth, Wilson & Co	1900	261	2 November 1901	17 September 1951	
613	Nasmyth, Wilson & Co	1900	262	6 November 1901	31 December 1940	Stowed 6 October 1931; boiler removed 15 November 1933
614	Nasmyth, Wilson & Co	1900	263	7 November 1901	28 June 1955	Converted to Ns 3 March 1922, and back to N 22 August 1933

== Namesake ==
The N class designation was reused in the 1970s when the N class diesel locomotives entered service.

== See also ==
- Rail transport in Western Australia
- List of Western Australian locomotive classes
