= Western Australian Government Railways U class =

Western Australian Government Railway U class may refer to one of the following locomotives:

- WAGR U class (1903)
- WAGR U class
