= Western Australian Government Railways E class =

Western Australian Government Railway E class' may refer to one of the following locomotives:

- WAGR E class (1879)
- WAGR E class
- WAGR E class (diesel)
