= Western Australian Government Railways M class =

Western Australian Government Railway M class may refer to one of the following locomotives:

- WAGR M class (1875)
- WAGR M class
- WAGR M class (diesel)
