= WAGR T class =

Class of Australian 4-4-0 locomotives

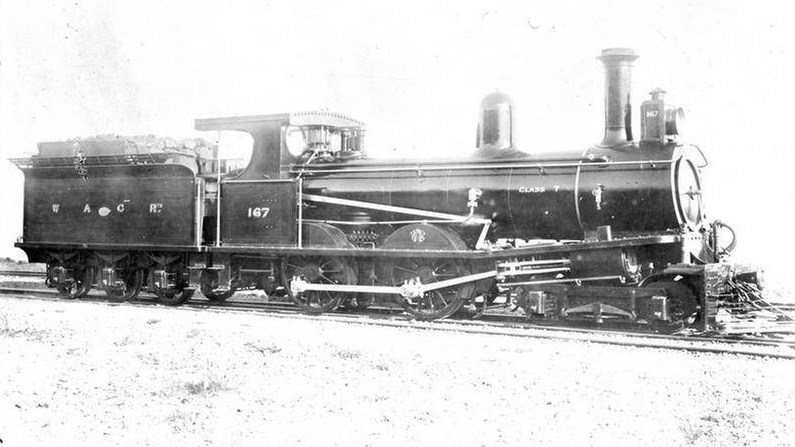
- T167, in its first WAGR livery, c. 1900
Type and origin
- Power type: Steam
- Builder: Beyer, Peacock & Co; Kitson & Co
- Serial number: Beyer, Peacock & Co: 2811-2816; Kitson & Co: 3106-3109
- Build date: 1887-89
- Total produced: 10
Specifications
- Configuration
  - Whyte: 4-4-0
- Gauge: 3 ft 6 in (1,067 mm)
- Length: 43 ft 3 in (13.18 m)
- Total weight: 49 long tons 6 cwt (110,400 lb or 50.1 t)
- Fuel type: Coal
- Fuel capacity: 2.5 long tons 0 cwt (5,600 lb or 2.5 t)
- Water cap.: 1,700 imp gal (7,700 L; 2,000 US gal)
- Firebox
  - Grate area: 15.2 sq ft (1.41 m^{2})
- Boiler pressure: 140 psi (965 kPa)
Performance figures
- Tractive effort: 9,692 lbf (43.11 kN)
- Factor of adh.: 4.6
Career
- Operators: Great Southern Railway, Western Australian Government Railways
- Numbers: T164-T173
- Disposition: all scrapped

The WAGR T class was a class of 4-4-0 steam locomotives operated by the Great Southern Railway (GSR) and later Western Australian Government Railways (WAGR).

== History ==
In 1887, Beyer, Peacock & Co, Manchester built a batch of six locomotives for the GSR. These were followed by four built by Kitson & Co, Leeds. As with all GSR locomotives they were named and not numbered or given a class designation.

All were included in the December 1896 takeover of the GSR by the WAGR and became the T class, numbered T164 to T173. They operated services from Albany through to Perth.

Withdrawals began in 1924 with the last remaining in service until 1952.

== Class list ==
The numbers, names and periods in service of each member of the class were as follows:

Builder's number	Builder	Year built	GSR in service	GSR name	WAGR number	WAGR withdrawn	Notes
2811	Beyer, Peacock & Co	1887	10 November 1888	Albany	168	31 March 1925	
2812	Beyer, Peacock & Co	1887	10 January 1889	Beverley	173	30 June 1925	
2813	Beyer, Peacock & Co	1887	6 March 1889	Ettakup	166	30 June 1924	
2814	Beyer, Peacock & Co	1887	5 February 1889	The Governor	165	30 September 1925	
2815	Beyer, Peacock & Co	1887	15 January 1889	Hordern	164	30 September 1924	
2816	Beyer, Peacock & Co	1887	11 March 1889	Torbay	169	20 April 1940	Stowed 8 June 1935
3106	Kitson & Co	1888	6 July 1890	Gordon	170	14 February 1952	Stowed 20 April 1931 to 4 April 1938; later combined with tender from R150
3107	Kitson & Co	1888	15 May 1889	Kendinup	171	19 October 1948	Stowed 20 April 1931 to 26 May 1938; later combined with tender from R228
3108	Kitson & Co	1888	10 April 1889	Mount Barker	167	31 March 1940	
3109	Kitson & Co	1888	6 August 1890	Stirling	172	30 June 1925	

== Namesake ==
The T class designation was reused in the 1960s when the T class diesel locomotives entered service.

== See also ==
- History of rail transport in Western Australia
- List of Western Australian locomotive classes
