= WAGR H class =

Class of Australian 0-6-0T locomotives

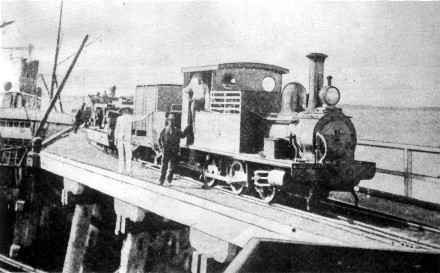
- H22 on the jetty at Port Hedland in 1920
Type and origin
- Power type: Steam
- Builder: Neilson & Co
- Serial number: 3630-3631
- Build date: 1889
- Total produced: 2
Specifications
- Configuration
  - Whyte: 0-6-0T
- Gauge: 3 ft 6 in (1,067 mm)
- Driver dia.: 2 ft 3 in (686 mm)
- Length: 20 ft 0 in (6.10 m)
- Loco weight: 14 long tons 1 cwt (31,500 lb or 14.3 t)
- Fuel type: Coal
- Fuel capacity: 0.75 long tons 0 cwt (1,700 lb or 0.8 t)
- Water cap.: 300 imp gal (1,400 L; 360 US gal)
- Firebox
  - Grate area: 5.25 sq ft (0.488 m^{2})
- Boiler pressure: 120 lbf/in^{2} (0.83 MPa)
- Cylinder size: 9 in × 14 in (229 mm × 356 mm)
Performance figures
- Tractive effort: 4,032 lbf (17.94 kN)
- Factor of adh.: 7.8
Career
- Operators: Western Australian Government Railways
- Numbers: H22, H18
- Delivered: 1889
- Preserved: H18
- Disposition: 1 preserved, 1 scrapped

The H class was a class of two steam locomotives operated by the Western Australian Government Railways (WAGR) introduced in 1889.

== History ==
In 1889, Neilson & Co, Glasgow delivered two 0-6-0T engines to the WAGR. H18 entered service on the Eastern Railway, while H17 was placed in store in Bunbury pending the opening of the Bunbury to Boyanup line. The WAGR sought to move H17 to the Eastern Railway, but the residents objected so it remained in store. H17 entered in service in May 1890 to operate construction trains, but by then the number 17 had been allocated to a G class locomotive, so it was renumbered H22. When the line opened in March 1891, H18 was transferred to Bunbury.

Between 1895 and 1897, both operated construction trains at Fremantle Harbour South Mole.

== Post WAGR history ==
H22 was sold on 20 March 1907 to the Goldfields Water Supply Administration to operate the Mundaring Weir branch railway. It was transferred back to the WAGR in September 1909 with the Weir line. In November 1911, it was sold to Smith & Timms to operate construction trains on the Marble Bar Railway, it then went back to the WAGR in June 1912 for use as a shunter at Port Hedland jetty shunter. It had been stored by July 1931. In May 1934 it was overhauled at the Midland Railway Workshops before re-entering service at Port Hedland. It was overhauled at Midland again in 1944. After the Marble Bar Railway closed on 31 October 1951, it was transferred to the Public Works Department for use as a shunter at Port Hedland. It was scrapped in 1956.

H18 transferred to the Goldfields Water Supply Administration in September 1904 for use on the Mundaring Weir branch railway hauling firewood and passenger trains. It was transferred back to the WAGR in September 1909 with the Weir line. In November 1911, it was transferred to the Public Works Department for use at Fremantle Harbour North Quay and later Esperance, and from 1926 on Bunbury breakwater construction and maintenance trains until it was withdrawn in the late 1950s. In July 1962, H18 was donated to the Australian Railway Historical Society and later placed on display at the Western Australian Rail Transport Museum. It was cosmetically restored at the Midland Railway Workshops.

== Namesake ==
The H class designation was reused in the 1960s when the H class diesel locomotives entered service.

== See also ==
- List of Western Australian locomotive classes
