= Dd class =

Dd class may refer to:

- Victorian Railways Dd class, 4-6-0 steam locomotives
- WAGR Dd class, 4-6-4T tank locomotives
