= WAGR C class (1880) =

Class of Australian 0-6-0T locomotives (1880–1899)

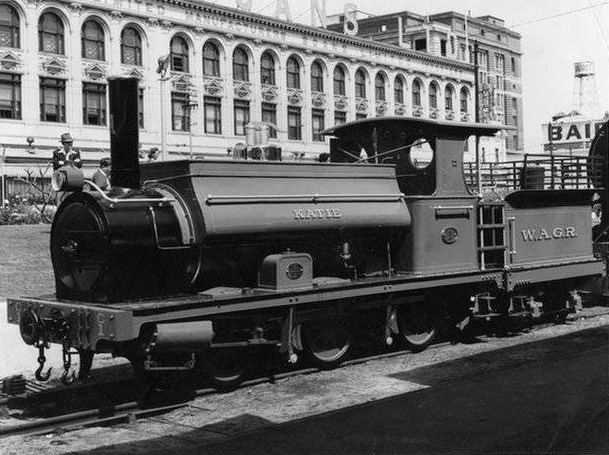
- C1 on display at Perth station in 1956
Type and origin
- Power type: Steam
- Builder: Robert Stephenson and Company
- Serial number: 2390-2391
- Build date: 1880
- Total produced: 2
- Rebuilder: Fremantle Railway Workshops
- Rebuild date: 1887
Specifications
- Configuration
  - Whyte: 0-6-0T
- Gauge: 3 ft 6 in (1,067 mm)
- Driver dia.: 3 ft 0 in (914 mm)
- Wheelbase: 10 ft 6 in (3.20 m) (pre-rebuild)
- Length: 23 ft 3 1/2 in (7.10 m) (pre-rebuild)
- Axle load: 6.5 long tons (6.6 t)
- Loco weight: 19 long tons 4 cwt (19.5 t) (pre-rebuild)
- Tender weight: 5 long tons 19 1/2 cwt (6.07 t)
- Total weight: 25 long tons 3 1/2 cwt (25.58 t) (post-rebuild)
- Tender type: 2 axle
- Fuel type: Coal (originally wood)
- Fuel capacity: 0.95 long tons (0.97 t) (pre-rebuild); 1.25 long tons (1.27 t) (post-rebuild)
- Water cap.: 350 imp gal (1,600 L; 420 US gal) (pre-rebuild); 950 imp gal (4,300 L; 1,140 US gal)
- Tender cap.: 600 imp gal (2,700 L; 720 US gal) of water and 1.25 long tons (1.27 t) of coal
- Boiler pressure: 130 psi (896 kPa)
- Cylinders: Two, outside
- Cylinder size: 10.5 in × 18 in (267 mm × 457 mm)
- Loco brake: Hand
- Train brakes: Vacuum
Performance figures
- Tractive effort: 5,292 lbf (23.54 kN)
Career
- Operators: Western Australian Government Railways
- Numbers: C1-C2
- First run: 2 March 1881
- Retired: 1899
- Preserved: C1
- Disposition: 1 preserved, 1 scrapped

The WAGR C Class was a class of steam locomotives built by Robert Stephenson and Company for the Western Australian Government Railways in 1880 to the same design as the NZR F class.

== History ==
The C class were ordered from Robert Stephenson and Company, Newcastle to operate services on the first railway line in Perth, which was the Eastern Railway from Fremantle to Guildford. However they were not ready when the line opened on 1 March 1881, with number 1 released from final assembly at Fremantle Railway Workshops the following day with number 2 entering service in May 1881. When delivered, they did not have bunkers with the wood that fired them having to be stowed in the cabs, so bunkers were retrofitted in May 1881 and August 1881. When engine class designations were introduced in 1885, they became the C class, numbered C1 and C2.

As the Perth railway network grew it became clear that the C class had insufficient fuel capacity. Both were rebuilt as 0-6-0STT saddle-tank tender engines with a small four-wheeled tender and new cylinders. This conversion necessitated the removal of the back cab wall. The original coal bunkers and cab front were retained although the bunkers were not used for coal storage.

The conversion of C1 was necessitated both through this insufficient capacity and also due to its having been involved in an accident in a crash on the Eastern Railway near Boya on 8 December 1885. It was recovered and transported back to the Fremantle Railway Workshops but did not re-enter service until 1887, when it emerged with its new tender. It had also been fitted with vacuum brakes.

Upon completion, they were reallocated to Spencers Brook to operate services to Northam, York and Beverley. Both were sold around the turn of the century for further service in the timber industry.

== Class list ==
Number	Builder's number	In service	Notes
C1	2390	2 March 1881	Sold February 1899 to Westralian Jarrah Forests, Greenbushes, remained in service until 1922 when moved with operations to Palgarup, loaned 1940 to Bunnings Brothers for construction of the Manjimup to Nyamup line, then stored, donated to WAGR and restored at Midland Railway Workshops, named Katie and placed on display at Perth station during Show Week 1956, remaining there until 1959 when placed in the Railway Exhibition Hall at Claremont Showground and in 1970 moved to the Western Australian Rail Transport Museum
C2	2391	May 1881	Sold February 1902 to Jarrah Timber & Wood Paving Corporation, Worsley, sold September 1913 to Bunnings Brothers and used at Lyalls Mill, Argyle, Muja, Tullis and Nyamup, withdrawn 1957 and scrapped in 1969

== Preservation ==
C1 has been preserved at the Western Australian Rail Transport Museum.

== Namesakes ==
The C class designation was reused for the C class locomotives from 1902 and again in the 1960s when the C class diesel locomotives entered service.

== See also ==
- Rail transport in Western Australia
- List of Western Australian locomotive classes
