= WAGR E class =

Class of Australian 4-6-2 locomotives

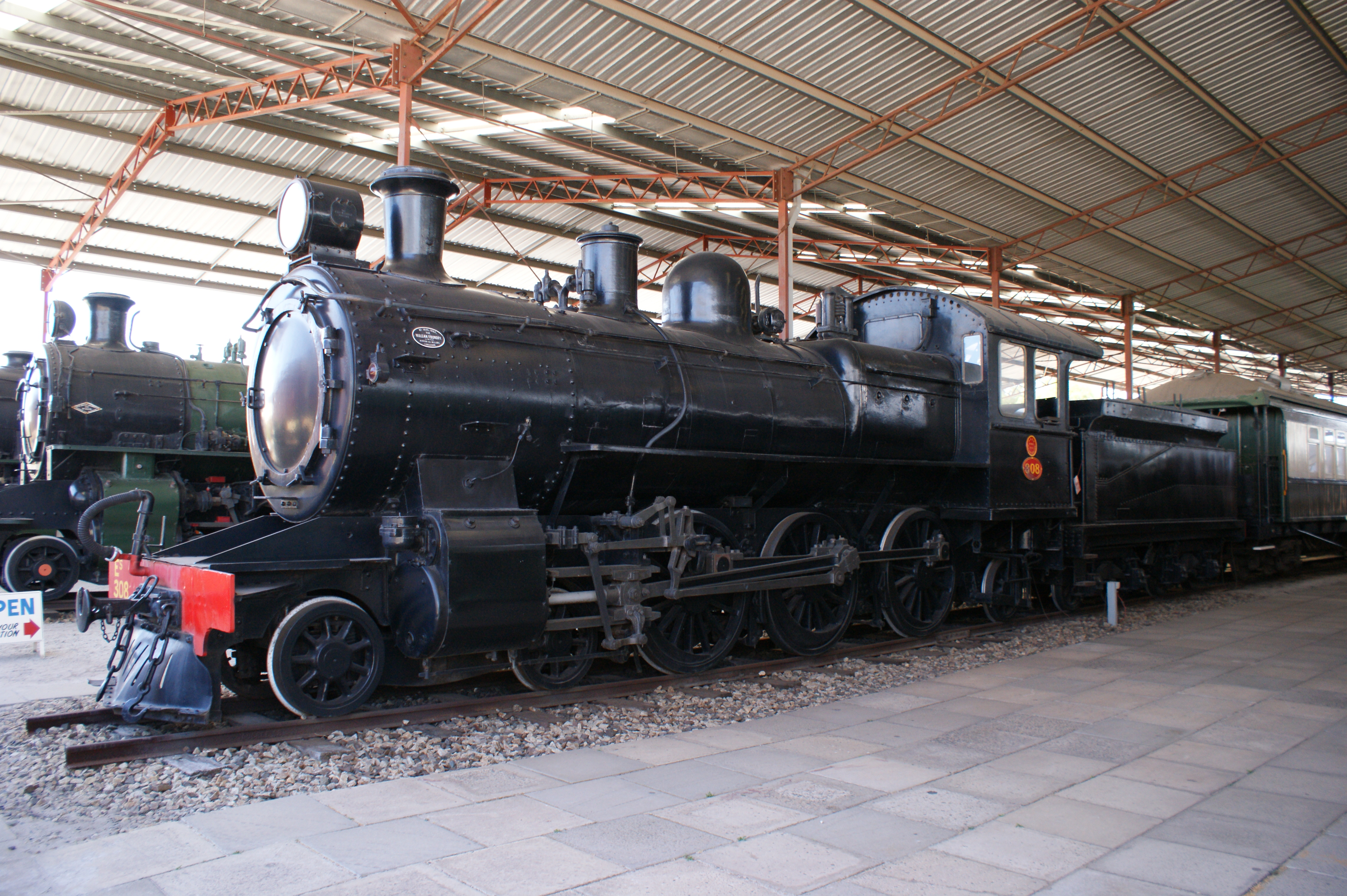
- Es308 at the Western Australian Rail Transport Museum
Type and origin
- Power type: Steam
- Builder: Nasmyth, Wilson & Co (15); Vulcan Foundry (30); North British Locomotive Co (20)
- Serial number: NW 641-655 (WAGR 291-305); VF 1844-1873 (306-335); NBL 19604-19623 (336-355)
- Build date: 1902-1903
- Total produced: 65
- Rebuilder: Midland Railway Workshops
- Rebuild date: 1924-1925
- Number rebuilt: 61 as Es class
Specifications
- Configuration
  - Whyte: 4-6-2
- Gauge: 3 ft 6 in (1,067 mm)
- Driver dia.: 4 ft 6 in (1,372 mm)
- Fuel type: Coal
- Water cap.: 2,200 imp gal (10,000 L; 2,600 US gal)
- Firebox
  - Grate area: As built: 19 sq ft (1.8 m^{2}); Rebuilt: 18.8 sq ft (1.75 m^{2})
- Boiler pressure: As built: 180 lbf/in^{2} (1.24 MPa); Rebuilt: 175 lbf/in^{2} (1.21 MPa)
- Cylinder size: As built: 17 in × 23 in (432 mm × 584 mm); Rebuilt: 18 in × 23 in (457 mm × 584 mm)
Performance figures
- Tractive effort: As built: 16,620 lbf (73.93 kN); Rebuilt: 20,527 lbf (91.31 kN)
Career
- Operators: Western Australian Government Railways
- Numbers: E291-E355
- Last run: October 1963
- Preserved: Es308
- Disposition: 1 preserved, 64 scrapped

The WAGR E class were a class of 4-6-2 steam locomotives built for the Western Australian Government Railways (WAGR) by English manufacturers Nasmyth, Wilson & Co, Vulcan Foundry and North British Locomotive Company, from 1902. The locomotives provided a huge increase in locomotive power available to the WAGR and were the mainstay traction of WAGR passenger services for two decades. The Es class was the name given to a reconstruction of all but four of the class carried out between 1924 and 1925.

== Background ==
In the early 20th century, the WAGR was using a wide range of locomotives for a variety of operational roles. One type of locomotive lacking, however, was a dedicated long-distance of express passenger locomotive. The R class engines of 1897 had not proved appropriate for the steep gradients made necessary by the crossing of the Darling Scarp, due to their lack of power. In 1900, orders were placed with British manufacturers, Nasmyth, Wilson & Co and Vulcan Foundry for forty-five 4-6-2 locomotives. These became the WAGR E class locomotives and were the first 4-6-2 locomotives in Australia. A further 20 were ordered in April 1911 from the North British Locomotive Company.

== History ==
Due to slow delivery times by the British companies as a result of full-order books and a preference for larger orders, twenty modified E class locomotives were ordered from the Baldwin Locomotive Works, Philadelphia and became the WAGR Ec class. They differed from the E class in that they were compound engines. The E class eventually totalled 65, with 15 examples being built by Nasmyth, Wilson, 30 by Vulcan Foundry and 20 by North British. The first fifteen entered service in 1903/04 and were successful from the outset, providing a much needed boost to WAGR locomotive power.

In 1924/25, all except 306, 336, 338 and 353 were rebuilt with superheated boilers and reclassified as the Es class. The E and Es class revolutionised the long-distance travel between Perth and Kalgoorlie. They were later replaced on this service by the P class in 1924.

In 1934, 336 and 346 underwent a weight reduction programme to allow them to operate on lightly laid lines. They were reclassified as the Ea class, being converted back in 1939. In 1945 the chassis, cylinders and wheels of eight Es class were used in the building of the Dm class.

The last was withdrawn in October 1963. Es308 has been preserved at the Western Australian Rail Transport Museum.

== Namesakes ==
The E class designation was previously used for the E class locomotives that were withdrawn in the 1890s. It was reused in the 1960s when an E class diesel locomotive was acquired with the Midland Railway of Western Australia.

== See also ==
- Rail transport in Western Australia
- List of Western Australian locomotive classes
