= WAGR C class =

Class of Australian 4-6-0 (later 4-6-2) locomotives

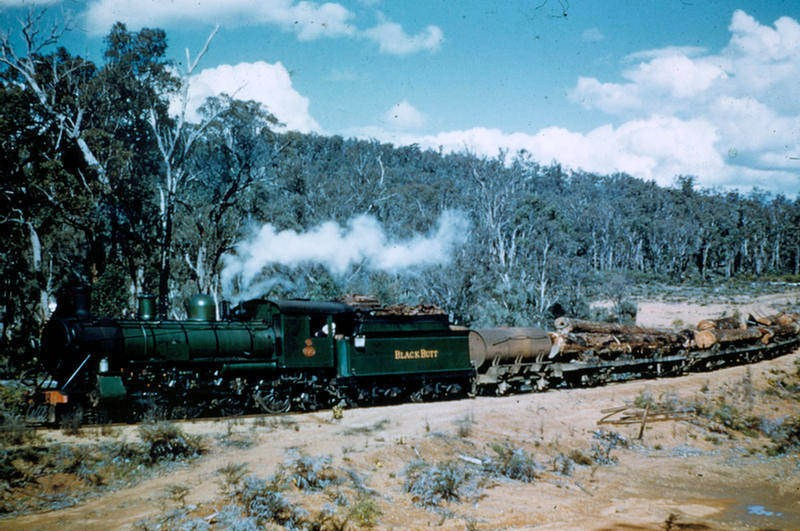
- Cs270 Black Butt on the Banksiadale mill railway, c. 1960
Type and origin
- Power type: Steam
- Builder: Baldwin Locomotive Works; Midland Railway Workshops
- Total produced: 22
Specifications
- Configuration
  - Whyte: 4-6-0 and 4-6-2
- Gauge: 3 ft 6 in (1,067 mm)
- Length: 55 ft 3 in (16.84 m)
- Total weight: C: 67 long tons 10 cwt (151,200 lb or 68.6 t); Cs: 71 long tons 9 cwt (160,000 lb or 72.6 t)
- Fuel type: Coal
- Fuel capacity: 5 long tons 0 cwt (11,200 lb or 5.1 t)
- Water cap.: 2,500 imp gal (11,000 L; 3,000 US gal)
- Firebox
  - Grate area: 17.75 sq ft (1.649 m^{2})
- Boiler pressure: 175 psi (1,207 kPa)
- Valve gear: Walschaerts
Performance figures
- Tractive effort: 18,182 lbf (80.88 kN)
- Factor of adh.: 3.5
Career
- Operators: Western Australian Government Railways
- Numbers: C264-C275, C431-C440
- Nicknames: Baby Yanks
- First run: 1 July 1902
- Retired: 1964
- Disposition: all scrapped

The WAGR C class was a class of light axle load steam locomotives operated by the Western Australian Government Railways (WAGR) between 1902 and 1961. A total of 22 were built in two batches.

== History ==
The first batch of 12 engines was built by Baldwin Locomotive Works, Philadelphia in 1902. This batch was originally of a 4-6-0 wheel arrangement, and was a lighter version of the Ec class, gaining them the Baby Yanks nickname. Between 1908 and 1918 these were fitted with larger, improved boilers and converted to a 4-6-2 configuration. A second batch of 10 engines was built by the WAGR's Midland Railway Workshops in 1915, to the modified 4-6-2 design.

They entered service on mixed passenger and mail services on the Eastern, Eastern Goldfields and Great Southern lines. They later operated on the Northern and South Western lines.

Seventeen members of the class were later fitted with superheaters and reclassified as the Cs class with the first completed in June 1929. In the 1940s, five received new frames. Four of these, Cs270 Black Butt, Cs432 Marri, Cs439 Banksia and Cs440 Jarrah were transferred to the Railway Department Sawmill at Banksiadale in the early 1950s and named. All were included in the sale of the timber mill to Hawker Siddeley Building Supplies in October 1961. After being replaced by road transport, all were scrapped at Subiaco in June 1964.

== Namesakes ==
The C class designation was previously used for the C class locomotives that were withdrawn in 1902. It was reused in the 1960s when the C class diesel locomotives entered service.

== See also ==
- Rail transport in Western Australia
- List of Western Australian locomotive classes
