= WAGR O class =

Australian steam locomotive class

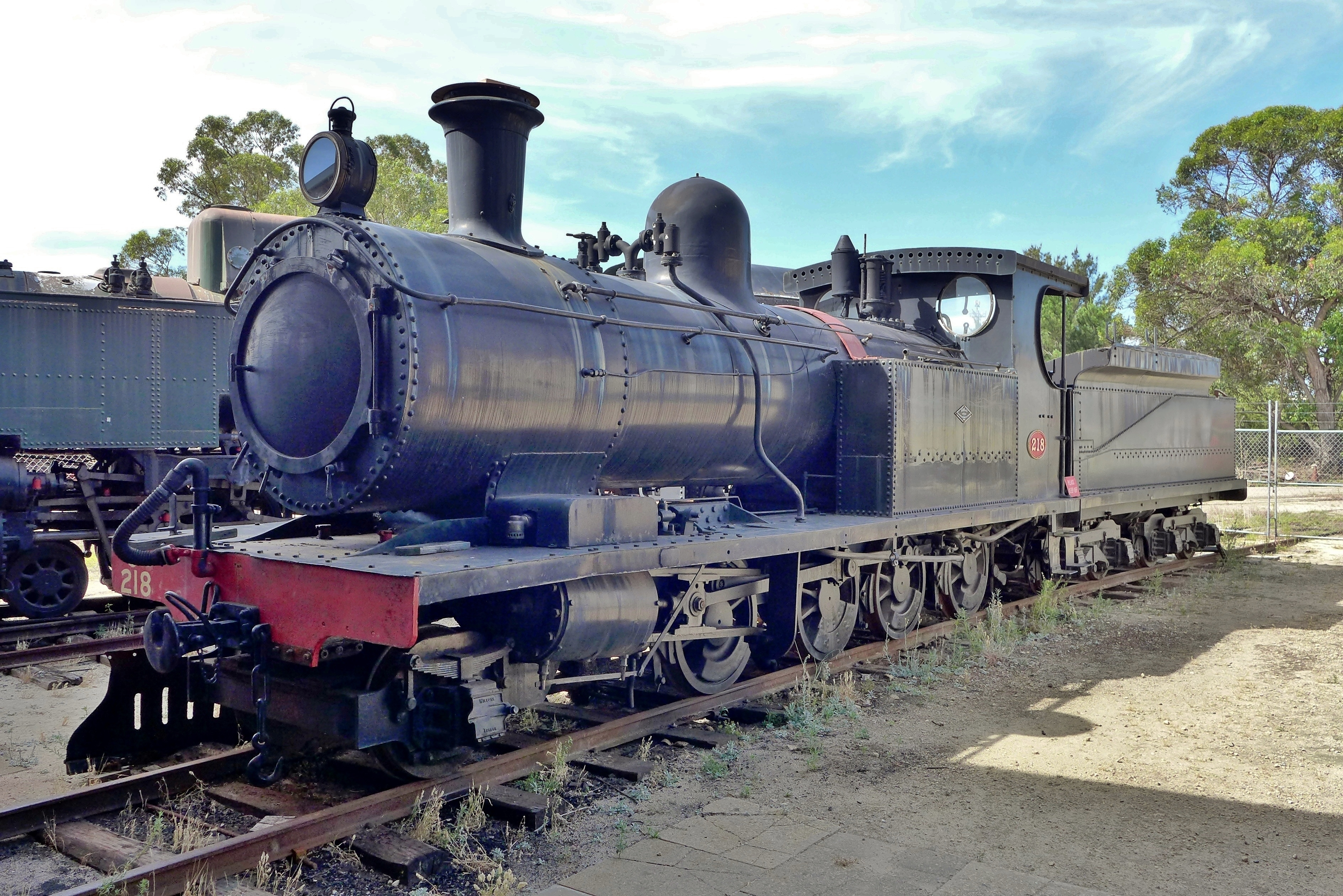
- O218 at the Western Australian Rail Transport Museum
Type and origin
- Power type: Steam
- Builder: Dübs & Co; Neilson & Co; Midland Railway Workshops
- Build date: 1896-1912
- Total produced: 56
Specifications
- Configuration
  - Whyte: 2-8-0
- Gauge: 3 ft 6 in (1,067 mm)
- Driver dia.: 3 ft 0 in (914 mm)
- Length: 47 ft 4 in (14.43 m)
- Total weight: 62 long tons 17 cwt (140,800 lb or 63.9 t)
- Fuel type: Coal
- Water cap.: 2,000 imp gal (9,100 L; 2,400 US gal)
- Boiler pressure: 160 lbf/in^{2} (1.10 MPa)
- Cylinder size: 15.5 in × 21 in (394 mm × 533 mm)
Performance figures
- Tractive effort: 17,221 lbf (76.60 kN)
Career
- Operators: Western Australian Government Railways
- Numbers: O74-O100, O208-O226, Oa24, Oa171-173, Oa175-179, Oa219
- Preserved: O218
- Disposition: 1 preserved, 55 scrapped

The Western Australian Government Railways (WAGR) O Class was a class consisting of fifty-six 2-8-0 steam locomotives which were introduced by the WAGR between 1896 and 1912. Despite them being tender locomotives, they also featured short boiler side tanks for additional water storage. A useful feature for the long distances required by operation on Western Australia's country lines.

== History ==
Between 1896 and 1898, the WAGR took delivery of 36 O class locomotives from Neilson & Co with a further 10 built by Dübs & Co. They initially operated services on the Eastern Railway and on the South Western Railway to Collie before being superseded by the Ec and K classes and moving to branch line duties. In 1907/08, 10 O class were rebuilt as N Class suburban tank engines.

Between 1909 and 1912, Midland Railway Workshops built a further 10 as the Oa class. The last examples of the O class were withdrawn from service in 1962.

O218 has been preserved at the Western Australian Rail Transport Museum. In April 2015, it moved to the Walkaway Station Museum on a five-year loan.
