= WAGR A class =

Class of Western Australian 2-6-0 locomotives

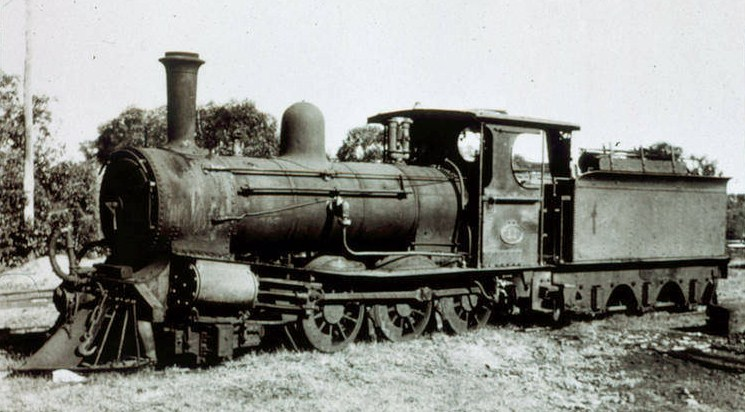
- A11 at Midland Junction in 1943
Type and origin
- Power type: Steam
- Builder: Beyer, Peacock & Co; Dübs & Co
- Total produced: 13
Specifications
- Configuration
  - Whyte: 2-6-0
- Gauge: 3 ft 6 in (1,067 mm)
- Driver dia.: 3 ft 3 in (991 mm)
- Length: 38 ft 0 in (11.58 m)
- Fuel type: Coal
- Water cap.: 832 imp gal (3,780 L; 999 US gal)
- Boiler pressure: 120 lbf/in^{2} (0.83 MPa)
- Cylinder size: 12 in × 20 in (305 mm × 508 mm)
Performance figures
- Tractive effort: 6,646 lbf (29.56 kN)
Career
- Operators: Western Australian Government Railways
- First run: 1880
- Retired: 1955
- Preserved: A11, A15
- Disposition: 2 preserved, 11 scrapped

The WAGR A class was a class of 2-6-0 steam locomotives designed by Beyer, Peacock & Co and operated by the Western Australian Government Railways (WAGR) between 1881 and 1955.

== History ==
John Robb, a contractor who was constructing the first section of the Eastern Railway between Fremantle and Guildford, ordered what would become the first member of the A class from Beyer, Peacock & Co. in Manchester. The locomotive was arrived in Western Australia in 1880, and was similar in design to the South Australian Railways W class.

Upon completion of the project in 1881, the WAGR acquired this locomotive and numbered it 3. The locomotive proved well suited to passenger and mixed train duties of the day; the type eventually grew to 13 examples via repeat orders from Beyer Peacock & Co. plus one example supplied by Dübs & Co. Three of the locomotives had six-wheel tenders instead of four-wheel ones. In 1885, when engine class designations were introduced, the locomotives became known as the A class.

Initially, the A class was used for main-line passenger services and later on branch lines when they were superseded by the larger G class. Several were used in various railway construction contracts, and many were sold to the timber industry as they became surplus to WAGR requirements. Others were relegated to shunting duties at the end of their working lives. The last example was withdrawn from service in 1955.

Two examples of the A class have been preserved. A11 was initially placed on display at the Perth Zoo and is now with the Western Australian Rail Transport Museum, while A15 was plinthed in Bunbury and is currently undergoing restoration in Meredith, Victoria.

== Namesake ==
The A class designation was reused in the 1960s when the A class diesel locomotives entered service.

== See also ==
- History of rail transport in Western Australia
- List of Western Australian locomotive classes
