= WAGR E class (1879) =

Class of Australian double-Fairlie 2-4-4-2T locomotives

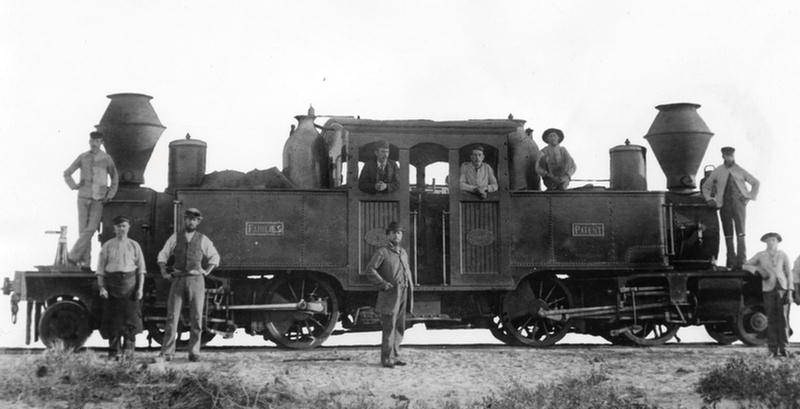
- E2 at Geraldton, 1886
Type and origin
- Power type: Steam
- Builder: Avonside Engine Company
- Serial number: 1239–1242
- Build date: 1879
- Total produced: 2
Specifications
- Configuration
  - Whyte: 2-4-4-2
- Gauge: 3 ft 6 in (1,067 mm)
- Driver dia.: 3 ft 3 in (991 mm)
- Loco weight: 33 long tons 9 cwt (74,900 lb or 34 t)
- Fuel type: Coal
- Fuel capacity: 7 long tons 0 cwt (15,700 lb or 7.1 t)
- Water cap.: 1,000 imp gal (4,500 L; 1,200 US gal)
- Firebox
  - Grate area: 13 sq ft (1.2 m^{2})
- Boiler pressure: 120 lbf/in^{2} (0.83 MPa)
- Cylinder size: 10 in × 18 in (254 mm × 457 mm)
Performance figures
- Tractive effort: 8,862 lbf (39.42 kN)
- Factor of adh.: 6.5
Career
- Operators: Western Australian Government Railways
- Numbers: E20, E7
- First run: 1881
- Withdrawn: 1895
- Disposition: Both scrapped

The WAGR E class was a two-member class of 2-4-4-2T double-Fairlie locomotives operated by the Western Australian Government Railways (WAGR) between 1881 and 1892.

== History ==
The E-class engines were built by Avonside Engine Co, Bristol in 1879 for the WAGR's Northampton railway line, the first government railway in Western Australia, which opened that year.

In line with Avonside's practice for assigning build numbers to Fairlie locomotives, each end received a separate serial number. However, after a collapse in the price of lead, the heavy mineral traffic for which they were purchased dried up and they were placed in store. One entered service in 1881, with the second remaining in store until 1885 when a M class had to be withdrawn for overhaul. When engine class designations were introduced in 1885 and became the E class, numbered E20 and E7.

In 1888, both were transferred to Fremantle Railway Workshops for use on the Eastern Railway. In 1891, E20 was cut up with the parts from one half with adapted to drive machinery at the Fremantle Railway Workshops, the other half was converted into a 2-4-2T tank engine as F20 in February 1893 for use at Fremantle Long Jetty. It was sold in February 1899 to Jarrah Timber & Wood Paving, Worsley and withdrawn by March 1905.

E7 was withdrawn in 1895 and sold to the Canning Jarrah Timber Company for use on the Upper Darling Range railway. It was scrapped in 1897.

== Namesakes ==
The E-class designation was reused for the WAGR E class locomotives that were introduced in 1902. It was reused again in the 1960s when an MRWA E class diesel locomotive was acquired.

== See also ==
- History of rail transport in Western Australia
- List of Western Australian locomotive classes
