= WAGR J class =

Class of Australian 4-6-0 locomotives

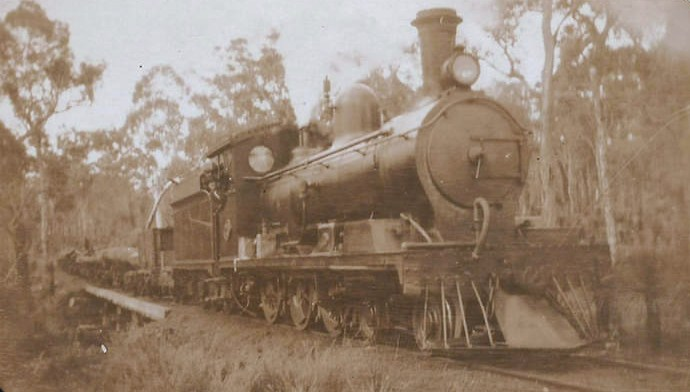
- J class at Wuraming ca. 1920s
Type and origin
- Power type: Steam
- Builder: Kitson & Co
- Build date: 1891
- Total produced: 3
Specifications
- Configuration
  - Whyte: 4-6-0
- Gauge: 3 ft 6 in (1,067 mm)
- Fuel type: Coal
- Fuel capacity: 2 long tons 0 cwt (4,500 lb or 2 t)
- Water cap.: 5,390 imp gal (24,500 L; 6,470 US gal)
- Firebox
  - Grate area: 14 sq ft (1.3 m^{2})
- Boiler pressure: 140 psi (965 kPa)
Performance figures
- Tractive effort: 13,045 lbf (58.03 kN)
- Factor of adh.: 4
Career
- Operators: Western Australian Government Railways
- Numbers: J28-J30
- First run: January 1892
- Retired: 1924
- Disposition: all scrapped

The WAGR J class was a three-member class of 4-6-0 steam locomotives operated by the Western Australian Government Railways (WAGR) between 1892 and 1924 before seeing further use with the State Saw Mills until the early 1930s.

== History ==
The J class engines were built in 1891 by Kitson & Co, Leeds, for the Fremantle to Beverley mail service. They arrived in Western Australia in late 1891 and entered service with the WAGR early the following year. However their fireboxes proved too small and in 1907 they were fitted with Q class boilers.

All three engines were withdrawn in January 1924. They were transferred to the State Saw Mills to haul timber trains and after repairs at the Midland Railway Workshops, J28 arrived at Wuraming in November 1924, J29 at Manjimup in May 1925 and J30 at Holyoake. All were out of use by the early 1930s, and later scrapped.

== Namesake ==
The J class designation was reused in the 1960s when the J class diesel locomotives entered service.

== See also ==
- Rail transport in Western Australia
- List of Western Australian locomotive classes
