= WAGR U class (1903) =

Class of Australian 0-6-0CT locomotive

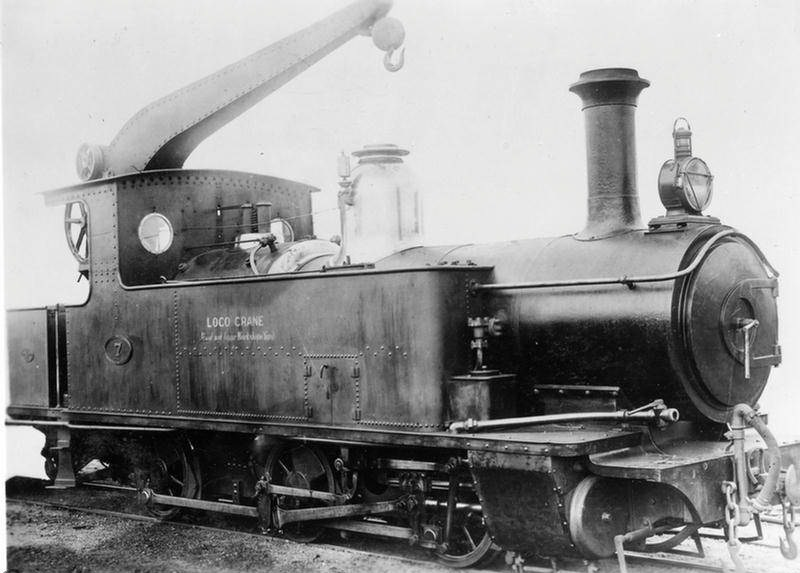
- U7 in original condition with crane
Type and origin
- Power type: Steam
- Builder: Vulcan Foundry
- Build date: 1903
- Total produced: 1
Specifications
- Configuration
  - Whyte: 0-6-0T
- Gauge: 3 ft 6 in (1,067 mm)
- Length: 27 ft 8 in (8.43 m)
- Loco weight: 35 long tons 4 cwt (78,800 lb or 35.8 t)
- Fuel type: Coal
- Fuel capacity: 0.5 long tons 0 cwt (1,100 lb or 0.5 t)
- Water cap.: 360 imp gal (1,600 L; 430 US gal)
- Firebox
  - Grate area: 12.5 sq ft (1.16 m^{2})
Performance figures
- Tractive effort: 15,680 lbf (69.75 kN)
Career
- Operators: Western Australian Government Railways
- Numbers: U7
- Disposition: Scrapped

The WAGR U class was a single 0-6-0 tank locomotive operated by the Western Australian Government Railways (WAGR) from 1904 until 1940.

== History ==
The U class locomotive was built in 1903 by Vulcan Foundry, and was equipped initially with a crane jib with a three-ton capacity. It entered service early the following year, as a shunter and mobile crane numbered U7 at the then new Midland Railway Workshops.

In 1925, the locomotive was rebuilt and re-issued to traffic with the crane removed and the fuel and water capacity increased. It remained in service until being withdrawn and scrapped in 1940.

== Namesake ==
The U class designation was reused in 1946 when the U class entered service.

== See also ==
- History of rail transport in Western Australia
- List of Western Australian locomotive classes
