= WAGR B class =

Class of steam locomotives

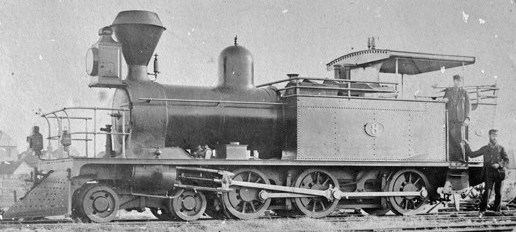
- B8 in original condition
Type and origin
- Power type: Steam
- Builder: Kitson & Co (8); Dübs & Co (3)
- Serial number: 1st batch: 2591-2592; 2nd batch: 2153, 2185, 2186; 3rd batch: 3780-3785
- Build date: 1884-86, 1898
- Total produced: 11
Specifications
- Configuration
  - Whyte: 4-6-0T
- Gauge: 3 ft 6 in (1,067 mm)
- Fuel type: Coal
- Water cap.: 1st & 2nd batches: 600 imp gal (2,700 L; 720 US gal); 3rd batch: 1,000 imp gal (4,500 L; 1,200 US gal)
- Firebox
  - Grate area: 1st & 2nd batches: 10.3 sq ft (0.96 m^{2}); 3rd batch: 11.7 sq ft (1.09 m^{2})
- Boiler pressure: 160 lbf/in^{2} (1.10 MPa)
Performance figures
- Tractive effort: 14,239 lbf (63.34 kN)
Career
- Operators: Western Australian Government Railways
- Numbers: B8-B9, B12-B14, B180-B185
- Disposition: all scrapped

The WAGR B class was a class of 4-6-0T tank locomotives operated by the Western Australian Government Railways (WAGR) between 1884 and 1959.

== History ==
The first two were ordered from Kitson & Co, Leeds in 1884 to work the steeply graded Eastern Railway from Guildford to Chidlow. A further three were built by Dübs & Co, Glasgow in 1885/86 and a further six by Kitson & Co in 1898. The last batch were built with larger water tanks, with the earlier five having larger tanks retrofitted. In 1903, they were displaced by the K class and relegated to shunting duties.

== Class list ==
The numbers and periods in service of each member of the B class were as follows:

Builder's number	Builder	Year built	Road number	In service	Withdrawn	Notes
2591	Kitson & Co	1884	8	1 June 1884	31 March 1924	
2592	Kitson & Co	1884	9	10 May 1884	30 September 1940	Stowed 20 April 1931
2153	Dübs & Co	1885	12	10 January 1886	31 January 1924	
2185	Dübs & Co	1886	13	12 June 1886	early 1897	Sold to WN Hedges early 1897
				by June 1898	25 May 1959	Repurchased by WAGR by June 1898.
2186	Dübs & Co	1886	14	6 July 1886	13 January 1955	
3780	Kitson & Co	1898	180	20 December 1898	5 May 1955	
3781	Kitson & Co	1898	181	23 February 1899	17 April 1956	
3782	Kitson & Co	1898	182	2 February 1899	8 October 1956	
3783	Kitson & Co	1898	183	2 February 1899	13 January 1955	
3784	Kitson & Co	1898	184	21 February 1899	13 January 1955	
3785	Kitson & Co	1898	185	16 February 1899	17 January 1958	

== Namesake ==
The B class designation was reused in the 1960s when the B class diesel locomotives entered service.

== See also ==
- Rail transport in Western Australia
- List of Western Australian locomotive classes
