= WAGR Dd class =

Class of Australian 4-6-4T locomotives

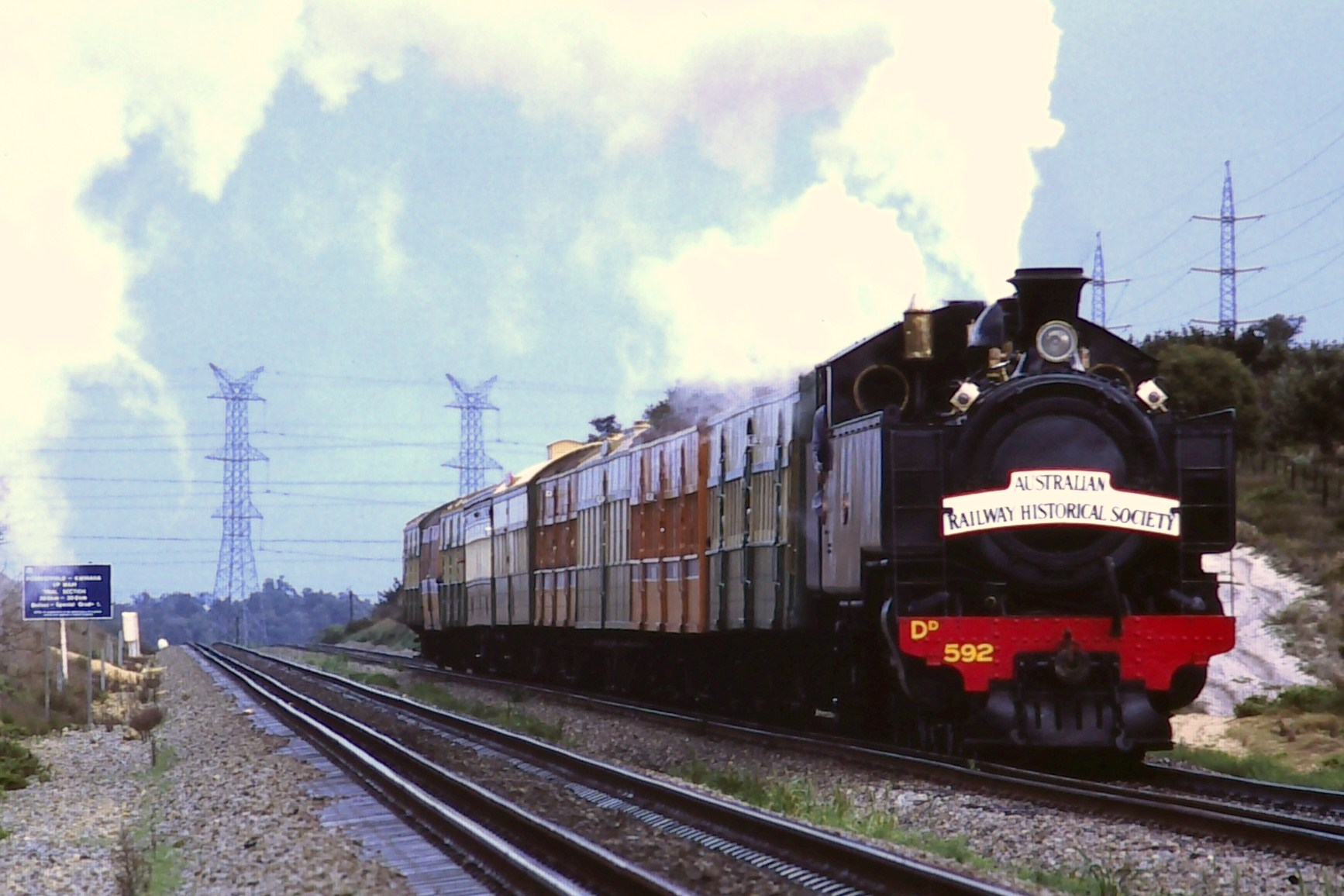
- Dd592 passes through Jandakot with an ARHS excursion train, 1986
Type and origin
- Power type: Steam
- Builder: Midland Railway Workshops
- Build date: 1946
- Total produced: 10
Specifications
- Configuration
  - Whyte: 4-6-4T
- Gauge: 3 ft 6 in (1,067 mm)
- Driver dia.: 4 ft 6 in (1,372 mm)
- Length: 43 ft 3 in (13.18 m)
- Loco weight: 72 long tons 0 cwt (161,300 lb or 73.2 t)
- Fuel type: Coal
- Water cap.: 1,820 imp gal (8,300 L; 2,190 US gal)
- Firebox
  - Grate area: 18.6 sq ft (1.73 m^{2})
- Boiler pressure: 160 lbf/in^{2} (1.10 MPa)
- Cylinder size: 18 in × 23 in (457 mm × 584 mm)
- Valve gear: Walschaerts
Performance figures
- Tractive effort: 18,768 lbf (83.48 kN)
- Factor of adh.: 4.7
Career
- Operators: Western Australian Government Railways
- Numbers: Dd591-Dd600
- Nicknames: Donald Ducks
- Preserved: Dd592, Dd596
- Disposition: 2 preserved, 8 scrapped

The WAGR Dd class was a class of 4-6-4T tank locomotive operated by the Western Australian Government Railways (WAGR) between 1946 and 1972.

== History ==
The Dd type was an evolution of the Dm class. However unlike the Dm class which used components of the old E Class tender engines, the Dd class components were all new. All were built at the Midland Railway Workshops entering service between April and November 1946. They were built to haul suburban passenger services in Perth, although they did on occasions work to Bunbury on the South Western and Merredin on the Eastern lines. The first were withdrawn in 1969, with the remainder in 1970/71 following the entry into service of the ADK/ADB class diesel multiple units.

== Preservation ==
Two have been preserved:

- Dd592 was preserved by the Australian Railway Historical Society in July 1972. In May 1984, Westrail commenced work at Midland Railway Workshops to restore it to operational condition as a Bicentennial project. It returned to service on 20 July 1985 and remained in service until August 1995. It became a static exhibit at the Western Australian Rail Transport Museum in May 1999.
- Dd596 was also purchased by the Australian Railway Historical Society in April 1974 and was placed on display at the Western Australian Rail Transport Museum. In July 1990 it was placed on display at the Gosnells Railway Market.

== Class list ==
The numbers and periods in service of each member of the Dd class were as follows:

Road number	In service	Withdrawn	Notes
591	12 April 1946	10 February 1969	
592	17 May 1946	14 August 1972	Preserved at Western Australian Rail Transport Museum
593	14 June 1946	10 September 1970	
594	28 June 1946	10 February 1969	
595	19 July 1946	17 June 1971	
596	9 August 1946	17 June 1971	Preserved at Gosnells Railway Market
597	31 August 1946	17 June 1971	
598	20 September 1946	10 February 1969	
599	11 October 1946	10 February 1969	
600	1 November 1946	10 September 1970	

== See also ==
- Rail transport in Western Australia
- List of Western Australian locomotive classes
