= WAGR M class =

Class of Australian 2-6-0+0-6-2 Garratt locomotives

WAGR M/Ms class
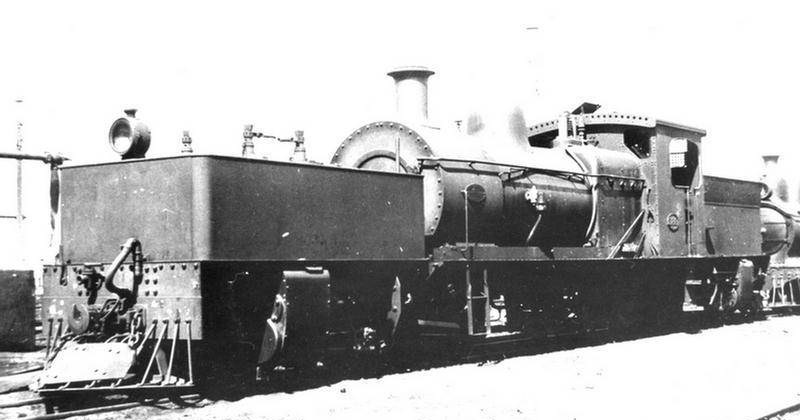
- M388 at East Perth Locomotive Depot, 1926
Type and origin
- Power type: Steam
- Designer: Beyer, Peacock & Co
- Builder: Beyer, Peacock & Co
- Serial number: 5477-5482, 5665-5671
- Build date: 1911, 1913
- Total produced: 13
Specifications
- Configuration
  - Whyte: 2-6-0+0-6-2 (Garratt)
  - UIC: M: (1′C)(C1′) n4t; Ms: (1′C)(C1′) h4t
- Gauge: 3 ft 6 in (1,067 mm)
- Loco weight: M: 68 long tons 16 cwt (154,100 lb or 69.9 t); Ms: 69 long tons 16 cwt (156,400 lb or 70.9 t)
- Fuel type: Coal
- Fuel capacity: 4 long tons (4.1 t)
- Water cap.: 2,000 imp gal (9,100 L; 2,400 US gal)
- Firebox
  - Grate area: 22.6 sq ft (2.10 m^{2})
- Boiler pressure: M: 175 psi (1.21 MPa); Ms: 160 psi (1.10 MPa)
- Heating surface
  - Firebox: 107 sq ft (9.9 m^{2})
  - Tubes: M: 1,233 sq ft (114.5 m^{2}); Ms: 960 sq ft (89 m^{2})
  - Total surface: M: 1,340 sq ft (124 m^{2}); Ms: 1,067 sq ft (99.1 m^{2})
- Superheater
  - Type: M: N/A; Ms: Schmidt
  - Heating area: M: N/A; Ms: 199 sq ft (18.5 m^{2})
- Cylinders: 4 (Garratt)
- Cylinder size: M: 12.5 in × 20 in (318 mm × 508 mm); Ms: 13.25 in × 20 in (337 mm × 508 mm)
Performance figures
- Tractive effort: M: 22,436 lbf (99.80 kN); Ms: 24,488 lbf (108.93 kN)
- Factor of adh.: M: 5.3; Ms: 5
Career
- Operators: Western Australian Government Railways
- Numbers: M388–M393; Ms424–Ms430
- Disposition: all scrapped

The WAGR M class was a class of 2-6-0+0-6-2 Garratt-type articulated steam locomotives operated by the Western Australian Government Railways (WAGR) between 1912 and 1955. A total of 13 were built by Beyer, Peacock & Co, Manchester in two batches.

== History ==
The first batch of six engines was constructed in 1911. These engines, entered into service with WAGR in 1912, were only the third Garratt design to be produced and represented a significant step in the development of the type. The second batch, which consisted of seven units, was built in 1913/14 and designated as the Ms class due to the use of superheated steam. One of the engines from the first batch was retrofitted with a superheater and given a Ms classification.

All of the M/Ms class locomotives were utilized to haul trains on the WAGR's light lines. They were withdrawn from service between 1947 and 1955, and all were scrapped.

== Class lists ==
=== M class list ===
The numbers and periods in service of each member of the M class were as follows:

M class, built by Beyer, Peacock & Co. in 1911:
| Builder's number | Fleet number | In service | Withdrawn | Notes |
|---|---|---|---|---|
| 5477 | 388 | 2 March 1912 | 4 September 1947 | |
| 5478 | 389 | 9 March 1912 | 19 December 1934 | Converted to Ms class |
| 5479 | 390 | 16 March 1912 | 17 April 1950 | |
| 5480 | 391 | 23 March 1912 | 17 April 1947 | |
| 5481 | 392 | 30 March 1912 | 4 September 1947 | |
| 5482 | 393 | 6 April 1912 | 20 November 1951 | |

=== Ms class list ===
The numbers and periods in service of each member of the Ms class were:

Ms class, built by Beyer, Peacock & Co.:
| Builder's number | Fleet number | Year built | In service | Withdrawn | Notes |
|---|---|---|---|---|---|
| 5478 | 389 | 1911 | 12 April 1935 | 28 September 1950 | Converted from M class |
| 5665 | 424 | 1913 | 27 September 1913 | 4 September 1947 | Stowed 25 July 1945 |
| 5666 | 425 | 1913 | 4 October 1913 | 4 September 1947 | |
| 5667 | 426 | 1913 | 27 September 1913 | 4 September 1947 | |
| 5668 | 427 | 1913 | 4 October 1913 | 4 September 1947 | |
| 5669 | 428 | 1913 | 4 October 1913 | 14 February 1952 | |
| 5670 | 429 | 1913 | 11 October 1913 | 13 January 1955 | |
| 5671 | 430 | 1913 | 11 June 1914 | 29 May 1953 | Erected at Midland Railway Workshops, October 1913, for State Saw Mills. In service at Manjimup, November 1913. Transferred to WAGR June 1914 in exchange for G57 & G59. |

== Namesakes ==
The M class designation was previously used for the M class locomotives that were withdrawn in 1911. It was reused in the 1970s when the M class diesel locomotives entered service.

== See also ==
- History of rail transport in Western Australia
- List of Western Australian locomotive classes
