= WAGR H class (diesel) =

Diesel electric locomotives

Western Australian Government Railways H class
Type and origin
- Power type: Diesel-electric
- Builder: English Electric, Rocklea
- Serial number: A.081-A.082, A.085-A.087
- Build date: 1964–1965
- Total produced: 5
Specifications
- Configuration
  - AAR: B-B
  - UIC: Bo-Bo, Bo′Bo'
- Gauge: 1,435 mm (4 ft 8 1/2 in) standard gauge
- Wheel diameter: 3 ft 4 in (1,016 mm)
- Minimum curve: 264 ft (80.467 m)
- Wheelbase: 31 ft 3 in (9.525 m) total, 7 ft 9 in (2.362 m) bogie
- Length: 45 ft 4 in (13.818 m) over couplers
- Width: 9 ft 6 in (2,896 mm)
- Height: 13 ft 8 in (4,166 mm)
- Axle load: 18 long tons (18.3 tonnes; 20.2 short tons)
- Loco weight: 71.3 long tons (72.4 tonnes; 79.9 short tons)
- Fuel type: Diesel
- Fuel capacity: 1,000 imp gal (4,500 L; 1,200 US gal)
- Prime mover: EE 6CSRKT mark 2
- RPM range: 850rpm max
- Engine type: 6 inline Diesel four stroke, four valves per cylinder
- Aspiration: Turbocharged, intercooled
- Generator: EE 819/8F
- Traction motors: EE 538
- Cylinders: 6
- Cylinder size: 10 in × 12 in (254 mm × 305 mm)
- Transmission: electric
- MU working: 110V, stepless electro-pneumatic throttle
- Loco brake: Air, dynamic brake
- Train brakes: air
Performance figures
- Maximum speed: 65 miles per hour (105 km/h)
- Power output: 950 hp (710 kW) gross, 860 hp (640 kW) net
- Tractive effort: 37,700 lbf (167.7 kN) at 6.5 mph (10 km/h)
Career
- Operators: Western Australian Government Railways
- Number in class: 5
- Numbers: H1-H5
- First run: 1965
- Current owner: SCT Logistics
- Disposition: 2 preserved, 3 scrapped

The H class are a class of diesel locomotives built by English Electric, Rocklea for the Western Australian Government Railways in 1964–1965.

== History ==
To assist with the conversion of the 657-kilometre (408 mi) Eastern Goldfields Railway from Perth to Kalgoorlie to standard gauge, five locomotives were purchased from built English Electric. After being shipped by sea from Rocklea, they were hauled on narrow gauge to Upper Swan with the first entering service in January 1965.

After the completion of the gauge conversion project they began to haul local freight and infrastructure trains. In October 1992, H4 was scrapped with the other used as shunters at Forrestfield until withdrawn in 1996. All were sold in 1997 to SCT Logistics for use as shunters at Dynon, Islington and Kewdale.

== Status ==
Key:	In service	Withdrawn	Preserved	Scrapped

Serial number	Entered service	Road number	Most recent owner	Status
A.081	March 1965	H1	SCT Logistics	Scrapped (August 2026)
A.082	May 1965	H2	SCT Logistics	Preserved, Rail Heritage WA
A.085	January 1966	H3	SCT Logistics	Preserved, Rail Heritage WA
A.086	February 1966	H4	Westrail	Scrapped (October 1992)
A.087	January 1966	H5	SCT Logistics	Scrapped (August 2026)
