= WAGR R class =

Class of Australian 4-4-0 locomotives

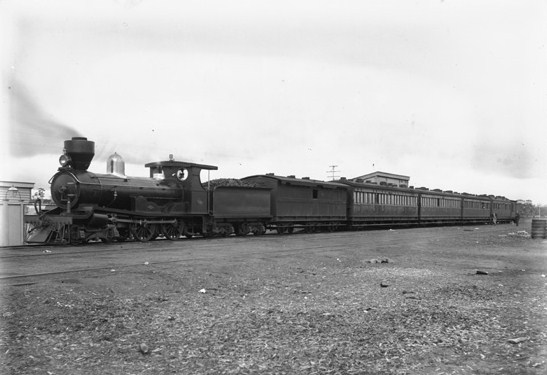
- R152 with a passenger train at Boorabbin, ca. 1905.
Type and origin
- Power type: Steam
- Builder: Dübs & Co
Specifications
- Configuration
  - Whyte: 4-4-0
- Gauge: 3 ft 6 in (1,067 mm)
Career
- Operators: Western Australian Government Railways

The WAGR R class was a class of 4-4-0 steam locomotives used by the Western Australian Government Railways (WAGR) between 1897 and 1953. All members of the class were built by Dübs & Co.

== See also ==
- Rail transport in Western Australia
- List of Western Australian locomotive classes
