= WAGR M class (1875) =

Class of Australian 2-6-0 locomotives built in 1875

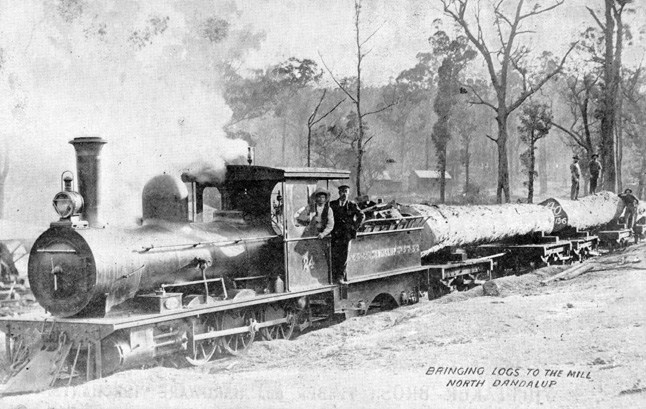
- M24 after its sale to Whittaker Bros
Type and origin
- Power type: Steam
- Builder: Kitson & Co
- Serial number: 2035-2036
- Build date: 1875
- Total produced: 2
Specifications
- Configuration
  - Whyte: 2-6-0
- Gauge: 3 ft 6 in (1,067 mm)
- Fuel type: Coal
- Fuel capacity: 3 long tons 0 cwt (6,700 lb or 3 t)
- Water cap.: 660 imp gal (3,000 L; 790 US gal)
- Firebox
  - Grate area: 10 sq ft (0.93 m^{2})
- Boiler pressure: 120 lbf/in^{2} (0.83 MPa)
Performance figures
- Tractive effort: 7,089 lbf (31.53 kN)
- Factor of adh.: 4.9
Career
- Operators: Western Australian Government Railways
- Numbers: M23-M24
- Disposition: all scrapped

The WAGR M class was a two-member class of 2-6-0 steam locomotives operated by the Western Australian Government Railways (WAGR) between 1876 and 1911.

== History ==
The M class engines were built in 1875 by Kitson & Co, Leeds as the first two items of motive power for the Northampton railway line, the first government railway in Western Australia. They were delivered to the port of Geraldton, the western terminus of the line, in 1876.

In 1893, both engines were relocated to Fremantle for use on the Eastern Railway. M24 was sold to Whittaker Bros in 1907, and M23 to Bunning Bros in 1911.

== Class list ==
Number	Builder's number	In service	Withdrawn	Notes
M23	2035	April 1876	August 1911	sold to Bunning Bros, spent most of its time at Lyalls Mill near Collie, but used at Muja (1938) and Yornup (February 1940 to March 1943) withdrawn by July 1946, scrapped by November 1958
M24	2036	February 1876	March 1907	sold to Whittaker Bros, North Dandalup in 1907 and named Danadalup, remained in use until the timber mill was destroyed by fire in 1944, sold to Bunning Bros in July 1945 and worked at Lyalls Mill and Yornup, numbered 4 in February 1951 and scrapped by March 1955

== Namesakes ==
The M class designation was reused in the 1910s for the M class of Garratt locomotives and again in the 1970s when the M class diesel locomotives entered service.

== See also ==
- History of rail transport in Western Australia
- List of Western Australian locomotive classes
