= WAGR U class =

Class of Australian 4-6-2 locomotives

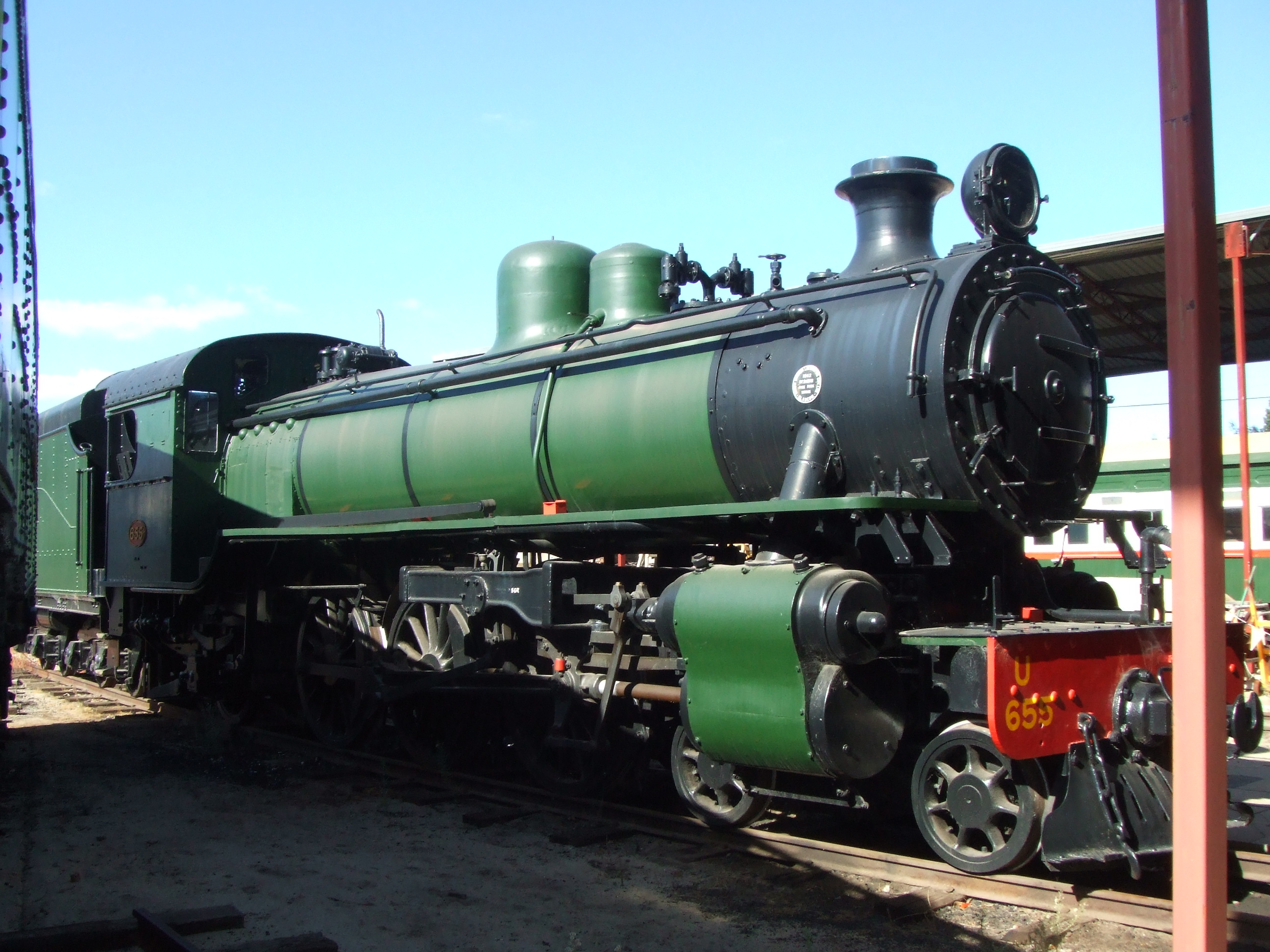
- U655 at the Western Australian Rail Transport Museum
Type and origin
- Power type: Steam
- Builder: North British Locomotive Company
- Build date: 1942
- Total produced: 14
- Rebuilder: Midland Railway Workshops
- Rebuild date: 1957
- Number rebuilt: 1
Specifications
- Configuration
  - Whyte: U: 4-6-2; Ut: 4-6-4
- Gauge: 3 ft 6 in (1,067 mm)
- Length: 60 ft 5 in (18.42 m)
- Total weight: U: 107.7 long tons 0 cwt (241,200 lb or 109.4 t); Ut: 80 long tons 0 cwt (179,200 lb or 81.3 t)
- Fuel type: Oil
- Fuel capacity: U: 1,800 imp gal (8,200 L; 2,200 US gal); Ut: 1,000 imp gal (4,500 L; 1,200 US gal)
- Water cap.: U: 4,000 imp gal (18,000 L; 4,800 US gal); Ut: 2,000 imp gal (9,100 L; 2,400 US gal)
- Boiler pressure: 180 lbf/in^{2} (1.24 MPa)
- Cylinder size: 18 in × 24 in (457 mm × 610 mm)
Performance figures
- Tractive effort: 22,032 lbf (98.00 kN)
- Factor of adh.: U:3.8, Ut: 4.2
Career
- Operators: Western Australian Government Railways
- First run: 30 November 1946
- Withdrawn: 10 September 1970
- Preserved: U655, Ut664
- Disposition: 2 preserved, 12 scrapped

The WAGR U class was a class of 4-6-2 steam locomotives operated by the Western Australian Government Railways (WAGR) between 1946 and the late 1960s. One was rebuilt as a 4-6-4 tank locomotive.

== History ==
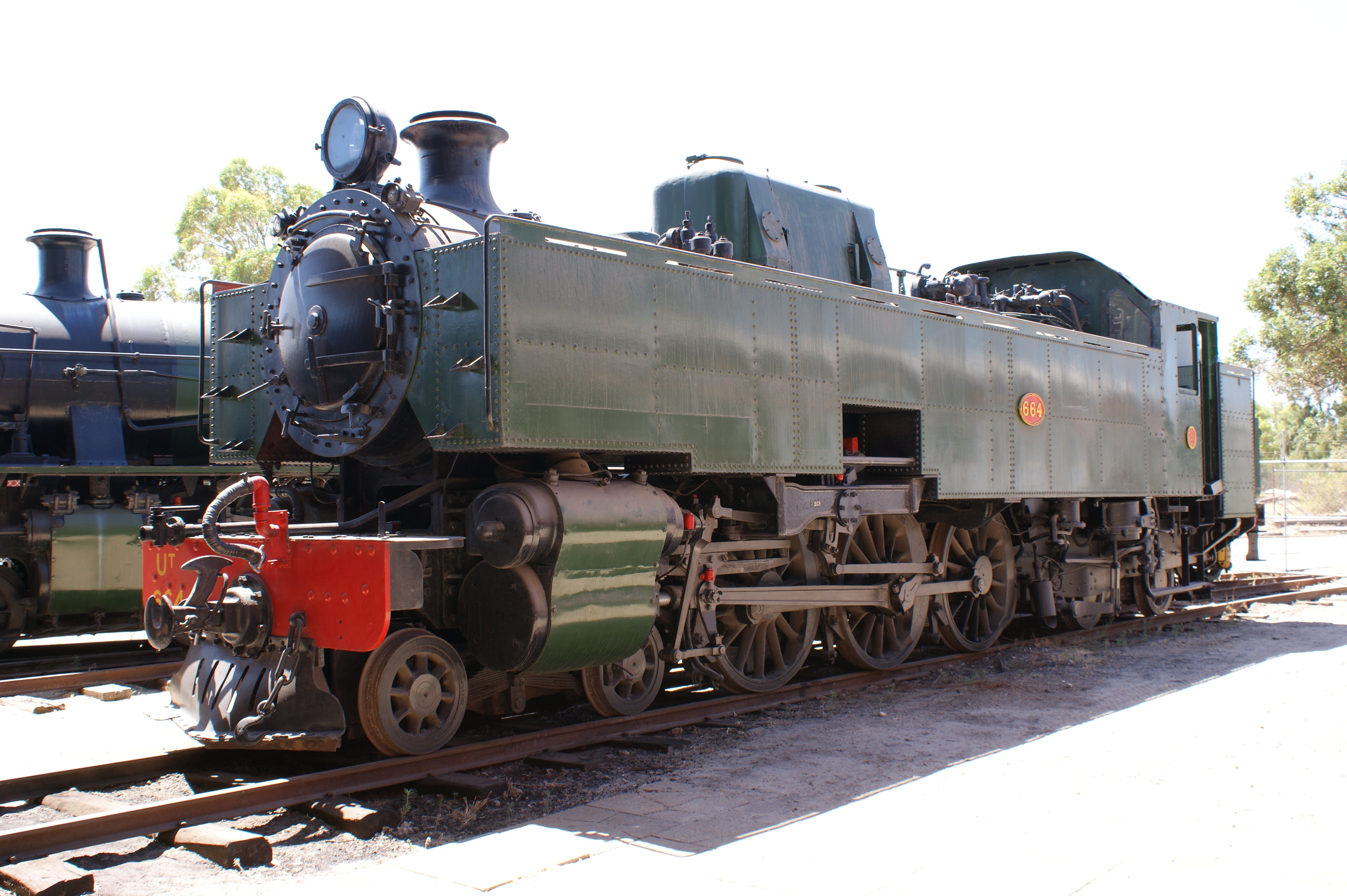
Ut664 at the Western Australian Rail Transport Museum

In 1942, the North British Locomotive Company built 55 locomotives for the British War Department. They were almost identical to the 220 class of the Sudan Railways. The new locomotives were intended to be available for use on various 3 ft 6 in (1,067 mm) gauge railways operated by the Sudan, Nigerian, Gold Coast, Belgian Congo, French Ocean Congo and Rhodesian Railways, depending upon the course of the World War II battles in North Africa. Unlike the 220 class, which burned coal, the new locomotives were equipped as oil burners, although they had provision for rapid conversion to coal burning, if necessary.

Of the 55 new locomotives, 35 were sent overseas in 1942 and 1943. The remaining 20 were stored unassembled in England at the Melbourne Military Railway near Derby. In 1946, six of these went to the Nyasaland Railways for use on the Trans-Zambesi Railway, and the other 14 were sent to Western Australia, where they became the WAGR U class entering service between November 1946 and April 1947.

Classified as the U class, they operated passenger and freight services between Perth, Albany and Bunbury. Following the delivery of the X class they were relegated to lesser freight services. By 1957, with their running costs being three times greater than that of coal powered locomotives, they were stored. Five were returned to service in 1961 during a coal shortage before being withdrawn again shortly after. Further brief comebacks were made in 1966 and 1967.

In 1957, U664 was converted to a 4-6-4 tank locomotive at the Midland Railway Workshops to allow it to maintain the faster schedules on Perth suburban services introduced when ADG class railcars were placed in service. Although deemed a success, no more followed due to its high operating costs. After being stored, it returned in 1966 to haul ballast trains on the Midland and South Western lines.

== Class list ==
The numbers and periods in service of each member of the U class were as follows:

Builder's number	Road number	In service	Withdrawn	Notes
24854	651	30 November 1946	6 October 1969	
24859	652	7 December 1946	6 October 1969	
24864	653	14 December 1946	6 October 1969	
24862	654	21 December 1946	6 October 1969	
24863	655	25 January 1947	10 September 1970	Preserved at Western Australian Rail Transport Museum
24867	656	7 February 1947	22 July 1969	
24865	657	14 February 1947	6 October 1969	
24866	658	14 February 1947	6 October 1969	
24861	659	28 February 1947	6 October 1969	
24843	660	7 March 1947	6 October 1969	
24844	661	14 March 1947	6 October 1969	
24860	662	21 March 1947	6 October 1969	
24842	663	28 March 1947	6 October 1969	
24841	664	4 April 1947	6 November 1956	Converted to Ut class in 1957; preserved at Western Australian Rail Transport Museum

== See also ==
- Rail transport in Western Australia
- List of Western Australian locomotive classes
