= Westrail N class =

Class of Australian diesel-electric locomotives

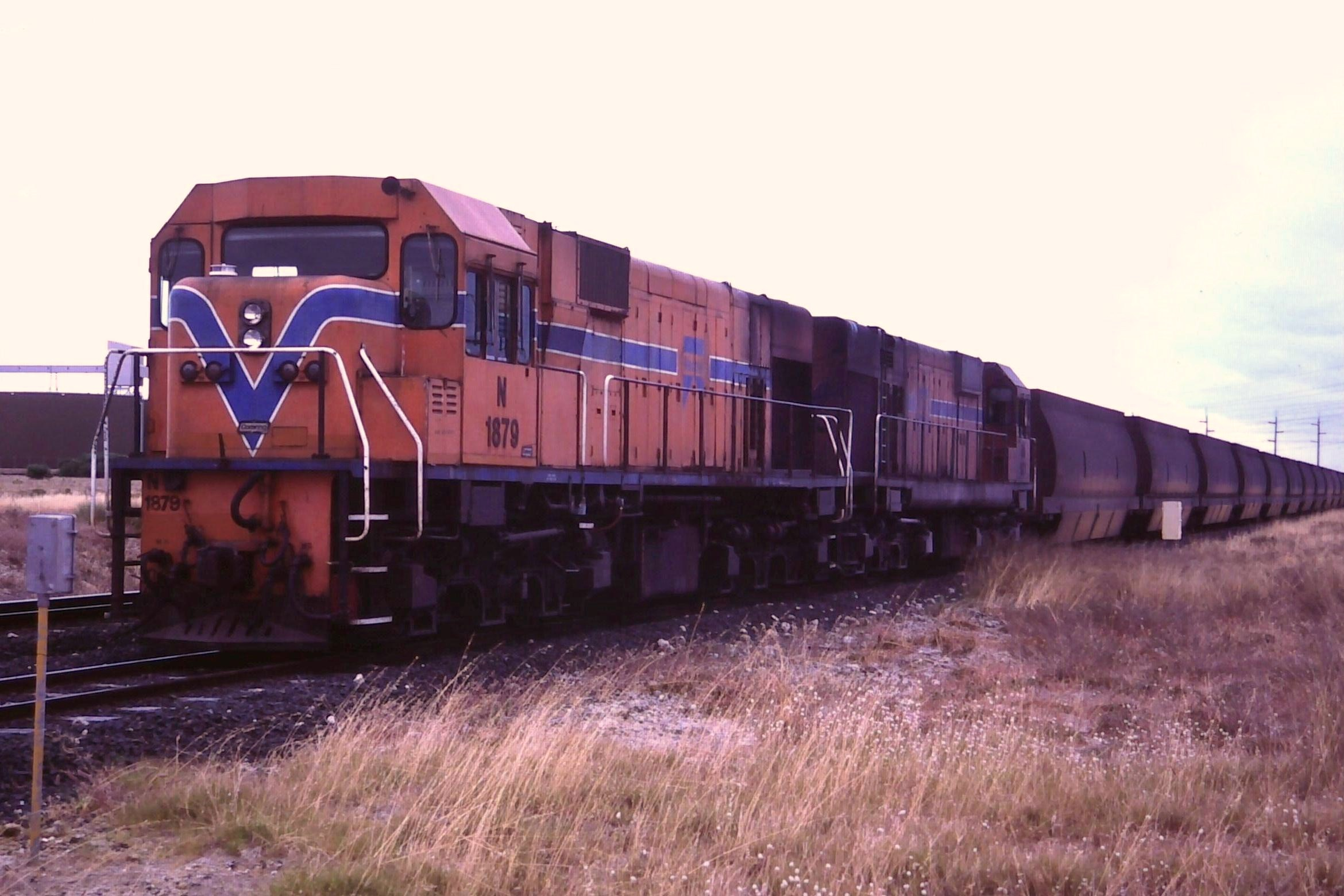
- N1879 & N1871 at Bunbury Harbour in December 1986
Type and origin
- Power type: Diesel-electric
- Builder: Comeng, Bassendean
- Model: CE618
- Build date: 1977-1979
- Total produced: 11
Specifications
- Configuration
  - AAR: C-C
  - UIC: Co-Co
- Gauge: 1,067 mm (3 ft 6 in); 1,435 mm (4 ft 8 1/2 in) standard gauge
- Length: 17.09 m (56 ft 1 in)
- Width: 2.90 m (9 ft 6 in)
- Height: 3.99 m (13 ft 1 in)
- Axle load: 17.7 t (17.4 long tons; 19.5 short tons)
- Loco weight: 106 t (104 long tons; 117 short tons)
- Fuel type: Diesel
- Fuel capacity: 4,000 litres (880 imp gal; 1,100 US gal)
- Prime mover: Alco 12-251CE
- Aspiration: Turbocharged
- Cylinders: 12
- Train brakes: N: Vacuum; NA/NB: Air
Performance figures
- Maximum speed: 105 km/h (65 mph)
- Power output: 1,790 kW (2,400 hp)
- Tractive effort: 282 kN (63,000 lb_{f}) (starting); 240 kN (54,000 lb_{f}) (continuous)
Career
- Operators: Westrail
- Number in class: 11
- Numbers: N1871-N1881
- First run: 5 December 1977
- Current owner: Australian Locolease; Greentrains
- Disposition: 11 scrapped

The N class was a class of diesel locomotives built by Comeng, Bassendean for Westrail between 1977 and 1979.

== History ==
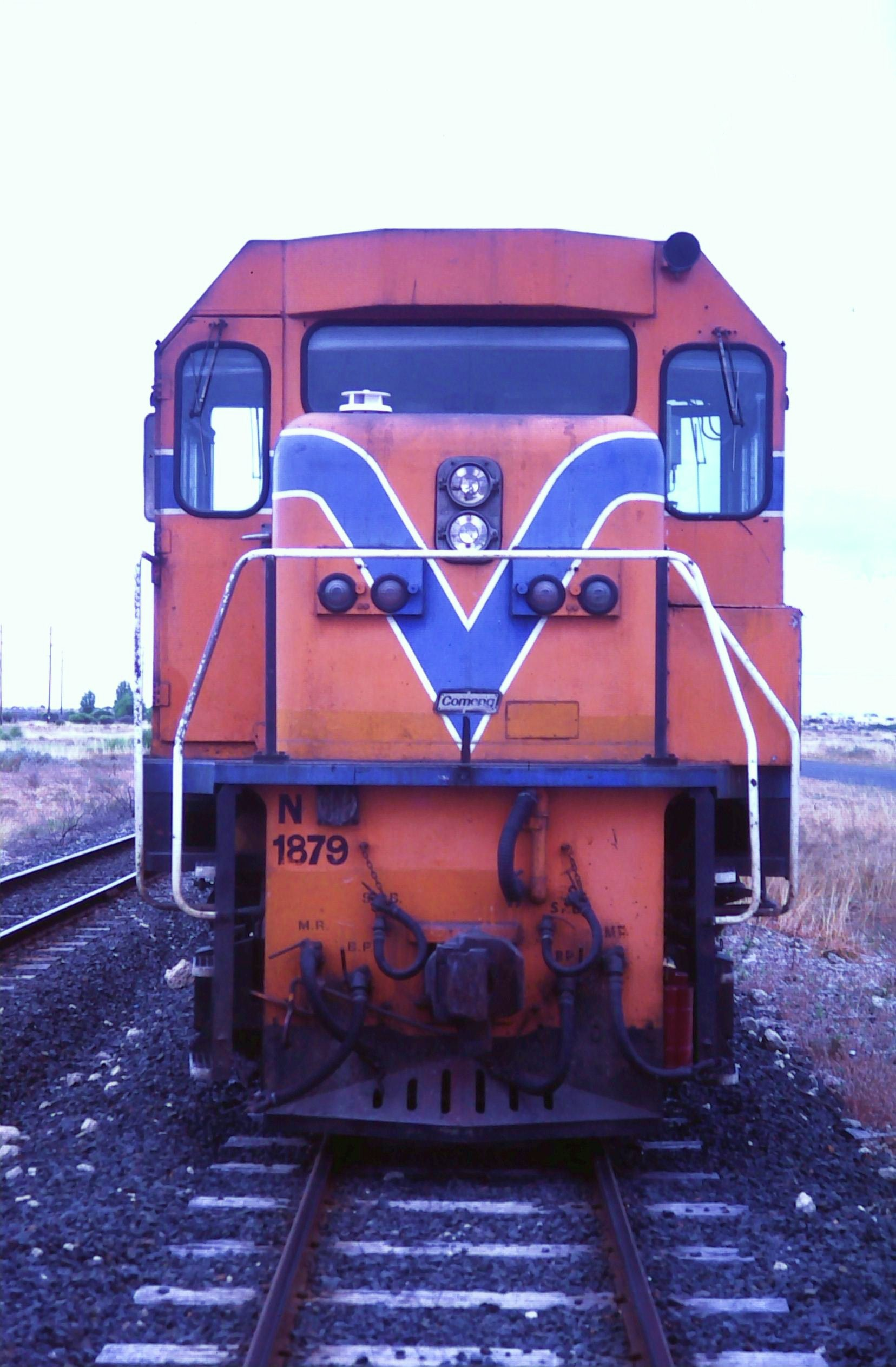
N1879 at Bunbury in December 1986

Eleven were built all for use on the Western Australian narrow gauge network, primarily to haul mineral trains in the south east. Between July 1982 and June 1983, the first four members of the class had their vacuum brake equipment replaced with Westinghouse air brake systems, and were redesignated as the NA class. While liked by crews for their ride quality and power, they suffered from reliability problems and most were withdrawn in the early 1990s. The last were withdrawn in 1997.

In January 1995 two of the NA class were converted to standard gauge using bogies from Mount Newman Alco M636s, and redesignated as the NB class. In February 1998 these two were sold to Austrac Ready Power, Junee. These were sold in 2004 to Patrick Port Link, Adelaide and again in September 2011 to Australian Locolease who redesignated as the 18 class and leased them to El Zorro for use in Victoria. After both locomotives remaining unused for some years, 1872 was scrapped in early 2020, whereas 1873 languished for another two years before being scrapped in mid-2022.

Austrac also purchased NA1874 but it was sold without use to South Spur Rail Services in 2001 and converted for standard gauge operation in January 2006. It was scrapped in 2014.

== Status table ==
Loco No	Revised No	Builders No	Entered service	Status
N1871		C-6099-01	5 Dec 1977	Converted to NA1871 1982
	NA1871		29 Dec 1982	Scrapped 1994
N1872		C-6099-02	20 Aug 1977	Converted to NA1872 1983
	NA1872		16 Jun 1983	Converted to NB1872 1994
	NB1872		Sep 2011	Renumbered to 1872 2011
	1872		Jan 1995	Stored South Dynon Locomotive Depot
	1872			Scrapped Feb 2020
N1873		C-6099-03	17 Nov 1977	Converted to NA1873 1982
	NA1873		9 Nov 1982	Converted to NB1873 1994
	NB1873		Dec 1994	Renumbered to 1873 2011
	1873		Sep 2011	Scrapped mid-2022
N1874		C-6099-04	30 Nov 1977	Converted to NA1874 1982
	NA1874		15 July 1982	Scrapped 2014
N1875		C-6099-05	15 Feb 1978	Scrapped 1994
N1876		C-6099-06	9 Aug 1978	Scrapped 1997
N1877		C-6099-07	27 Sep 1978	Scrapped 1997
N1878		C-6099-08	22 Dec 1978	Scrapped 1994
N1879		C-6099-09	22 Dec 1978	Scrapped 1994
N1880		C-6099-10	10 Jan 1979	Scrapped 1997
N1881		C-6099-11	26 Jun 1979	Scrapped 1994
