= WAGR Ec class =

Class of Australian 4-6-2 locomotives

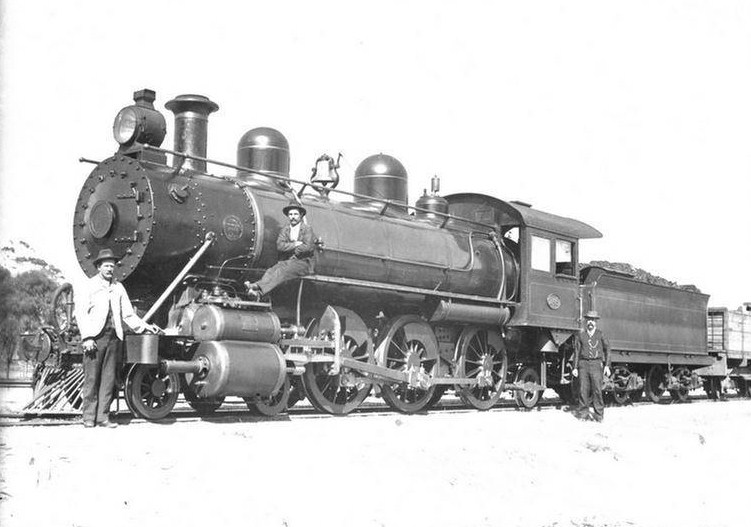
- Ec249 at Kellerberrin on the Eastern Goldfields Railway in 1903
Type and origin
- Power type: Steam
- Builder: Baldwin Locomotive Works
- Total produced: 20
- Rebuilder: Midland Railway Workshops
- Rebuild date: 1924–25 as L class
- Number rebuilt: 20
Specifications
- Configuration
  - Whyte: 4-6-2
- Gauge: 3 ft 6 in (1,067 mm)
- Total weight: Ec: 73 long tons 0 cwt (163,500 lb or 74.2 t); L: 77 long tons 12 cwt (173,800 lb or 78.8 t)
- Fuel type: Coal
- Fuel capacity: 5 long tons 0 cwt (11,200 lb or 5.1 t)
- Water cap.: 2,500 imp gal (11,000 L; 3,000 US gal)
- Firebox
  - Grate area: 20.5 sq ft (1.90 m^{2})
- Boiler pressure: Ec: 200 lbf/in^{2} (1.38 MPa); L: 160 lbf/in^{2} (1.10 MPa)
- Cylinders: 4
- Valve gear: Stephenson
Performance figures
- Tractive effort: Ec: 16,000 lbf (71.17 kN); L: 17,952 lbf (79.85 kN)
- Factor of adh.: Ec: 4.5, L: 3.5
Career
- Operators: Western Australian Government Railways
- Numbers: Ec236-Ec255
- Nicknames: Bull Yanks
- First run: 1901
- Retired: 1958
- Disposition: all scrapped

The WAGR Ec class was a class of 4-6-2 heavy passenger and goods Vauclain compound locomotives operated by the Western Australian Government Railways (WAGR) between 1901 and 1958.

== History ==
A total of 20 Ec class engines were built by Baldwin Locomotive Works, Philadelphia, in the first half of 1901, and entered service with the WAGR later that year. The following year, Baldwin built the first of two batches of the C class, a lighter version of the Ec class.

Initially, the Ec class' main task was to haul heavy trains on the Eastern Goldfields Railway. Between 1920 and 1923, nine Ec class engines were lightened for use on the lightly laid Northam to Mullewa line, and reclassified as the Eca class.

All 20 were withdrawn between 1923 and 1925, with the frames, wheels, cabs and tenders married with new boilers, cylinders and valve gear at Midland Railway Workshops to become the L class. The costs of the rebuilds were recovered within four years through lower maintenance costs.

By the early 1930s, frame cracks were beginning to appear with 14 receiving new frames. They were replaced in the 1950s by the W class.

== See also ==
- Rail transport in Western Australia
- List of Western Australian locomotive classes
