= WAGR C class (diesel) =

Class of Australian Co′Co′ diesel-electric locomotives

Western Australian Government Railways C class
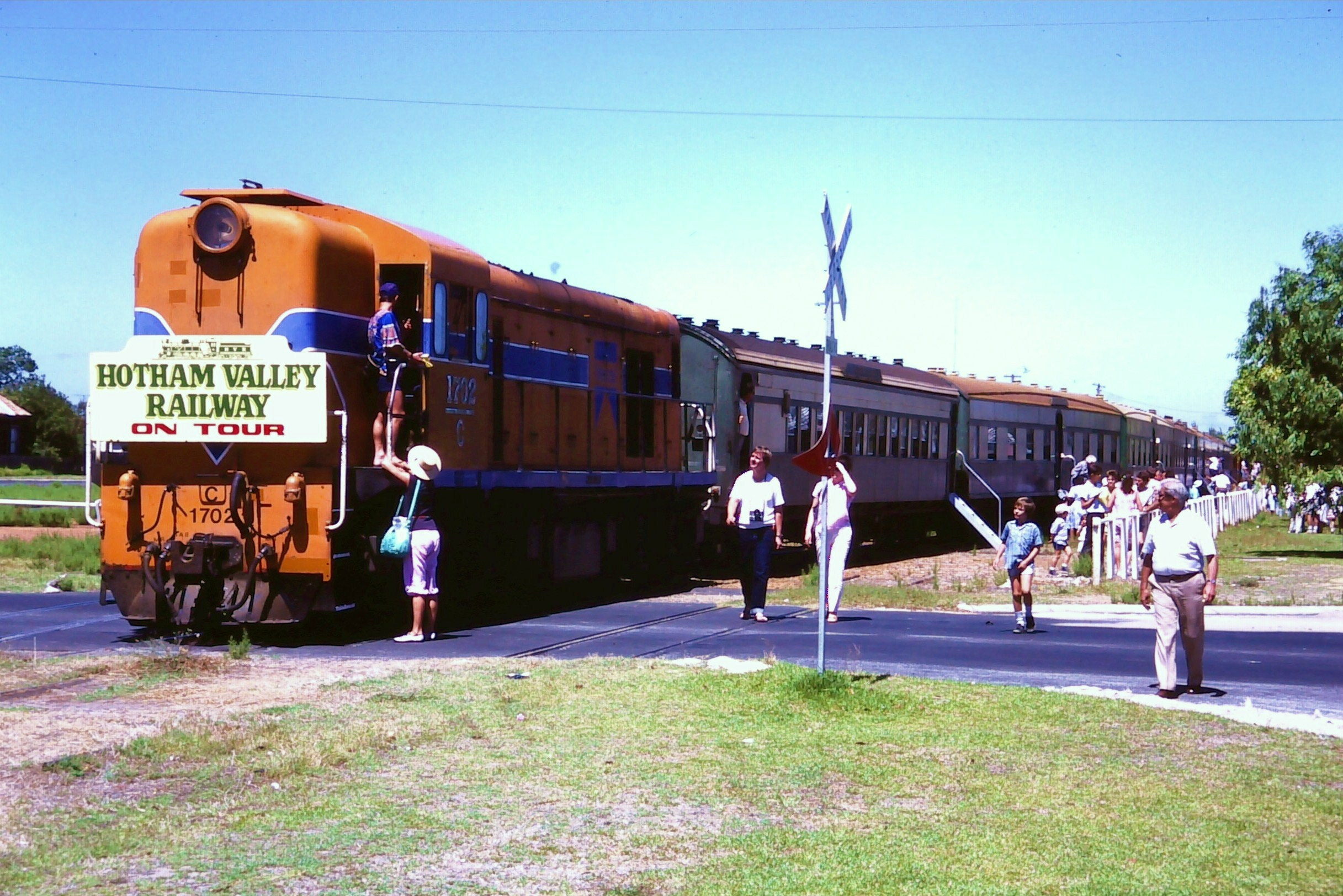
- C1702 at Busselton with a Hotham Valley Railway tour train in March 1986
Type and origin
- Power type: Diesel-electric
- Builder: English Electric, Rocklea
- Build date: 1962
- Total produced: 3
Specifications
- Configuration
  - Commonwealth: Co-Co
- Gauge: 1,067 mm (3 ft 6 in)
- Wheel diameter: 3 ft 4 in (1.02 m)
- Minimum curve: 250 ft (76.200 m)
- Wheelbase: 40 ft (12.192 m) total, 12 ft 6 in (3.810 m) bogie
- Length: 49 ft 6 in (15.088 m) over headstocks
- Width: 9 ft (2.743 m)
- Height: 12 ft 11 in (3.937 m)
- Axle load: 14.8 long tons (15.0 t; 16.6 short tons)
- Loco weight: 89 long tons (90 t; 100 short tons)
- Fuel type: Diesel
- Fuel capacity: 800 imp gal (3,636.872 L)
- Prime mover: English Electric 12SVT mark 2
- RPM range: 850rpm max
- Engine type: four stroke, four valves per cylinder
- Aspiration: turbocharged
- Generator: English Electric 822
- Traction motors: English Electric 548
- Cylinders: 12 vee
- Cylinder size: 10 in × 12 in (254 mm × 305 mm)
- Transmission: electric
- MU working: 110V, stepless electro-pneumatic throttle
- Loco brake: straight air
- Train brakes: vacuum
Performance figures
- Maximum speed: 60 miles per hour (97 km/h)
- Power output: 1,535 hp (1,140 kW) gross, 1,388 hp (1,040 kW) net
- Tractive effort: 45,500 lbf (202.4 kN) at 8.8 mph (10 km/h)
Career
- Operators: Western Australian Government Railways
- Number in class: 3
- Numbers: C1701-C1703
- First run: September 1962
- Preserved: C1701, C1702, C1703
- Disposition: All 3 preserved

The C class are a class of diesel locomotives built by English Electric, Rocklea for the Western Australian Government Railways in 1962.

== History ==
The C class was developed from the Queensland Railways 1250 class. The three members of the class entered service in 1962.

They initially hauled passenger services including The Australind, The Kalgoorlie and The Westland before being relegated to hauling suburban passenger services in Perth and shunting at Avon, Forestfield and Geraldton. The last was withdrawn by Westrail in the March 1992 with all three preserved. C1703 is accredited for mainline operation and is periodically used on infrastructure trains.

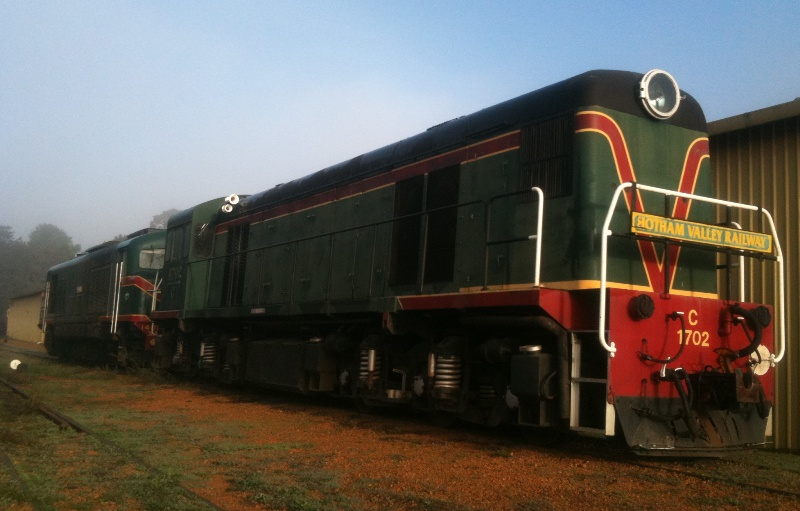
C1702 at the Hotham Valley Railway in September 2011
