= MRWA B class =

Class of Australian 4-4-0 locomotives

Midland Railway of Western Australia B class
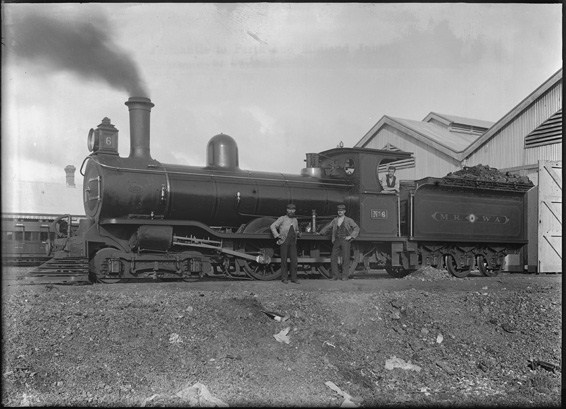
- B6 with crew at Watheroo, ca 1910
Type and origin
- Power type: Steam
- Builder: Hawthorn Leslie, Tyneside, England
- Serial number: 2213–2221
Specifications
- Configuration
  - Whyte: 4-4-0
  - UIC: 2′B
- Gauge: 3 ft 6 in (1,067 mm)
- Driver dia.: 4 ft 4 in (1,321 mm)
- Length: 43 ft 3 in (13.18 m) (incl tender)
- Loco weight: 49.75 long tons (50.55 t; 55.72 short tons) (incl tender)
- Firebox
  - Grate area: 14 sq ft (1.3 m^{2})
- Boiler pressure: 160 psi (1,100 kPa)
- Cylinder size: 15 in × 20 in (381 mm × 508 mm)
Performance figures
- Power output: 660 hp (490 kW)
- Tractive effort: 11,076 lb_{f} (49.27 kN)
Career
- Number in class: 9
- Numbers: B2 - B10
- First run: 1891

The MRWA B class was a class of 4-4-0 steam locomotives built by Hawthorn Leslie in Tyneside, England, for the Midland Railway of Western Australia (MRWA). The class's wheel arrangement was 4-4-0.

== Service history ==
The nine members of the B class entered service in 1891. Withdrawals began in 1929, but the five longest serving units continued working on the MRWA, mainly as shunting engines, from then until the 1950s.

== Preservation ==
One B class locomotive, no B6, has been preserved. It is the only ex-MRWA steam locomotive still in existence. After being withdrawn by the MRWA in 1956, B6 was acquired by the then municipality of Geraldton, and put on display in a Geraldton park.

In 1995, ownership of B6 was transferred to the then Shire of Swan, and in 1999 the locomotive was moved to the former Midland Railway Workshops, for storage in the custody of Rail Heritage WA.

In 2010, following a renewal of interest by the City of Geraldton-Greenough in rail history, B6 was moved back to the Geraldton area, for intended eventual display at a proposed railway museum at Walkaway.

== See also ==
- List of Western Australian locomotive classes
- Locomotives of the Western Australian Government Railways
