= MRWA P class =

Class of Australian 4-4-0 locomotives

Midland Railway of Western Australia P class
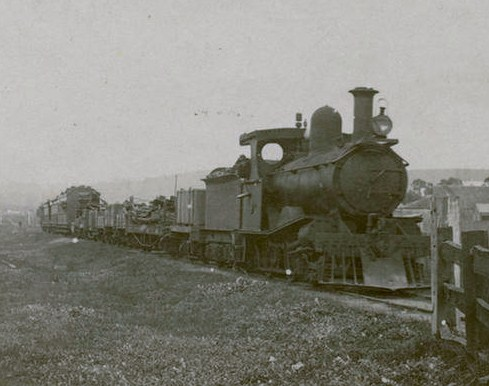
- P class near Midland Junction
Type and origin
- Power type: Steam
- Builder: James Martin & Co
- Serial number: 134-135
- Build date: 1896
- Total produced: 2
Specifications
- Configuration
  - Whyte: 4-4-0
  - UIC: 2′B
- Gauge: 3 ft 6 in (1,067 mm)
- Driver dia.: 4 ft 6 in (1,372 mm)
- Length: 46 ft 0 in (14.02 m)
- Total weight: 51 long tons 05 cwt (114,800 lb or 52.1 t)
- Fuel type: Coal
- Firebox
  - Grate area: 13.87 sq ft (1.289 m^{2})
- Boiler pressure: 140 lbf/in^{2} (0.97 MPa)
- Cylinder size: 15 in × 20 in (381 mm × 508 mm)
Performance figures
- Tractive effort: 9,333 lbf (41.52 kN)
Career
- Operators: Western Australian Government Railways; Midland Railway of Western Australia
- Numbers: P62, P63/P12
- First run: September 1896
- Disposition: all scrapped

The MRWA P class was a class of steam locomotives operated by the Western Australian Government Railways (WAGR) and later the Midland Railway of Western Australia (MRWA) from 1896.

== History ==
In July and August 1896, the WAGR took delivery of two steam locomotives from James Martin & Co, Gawler, South Australia. They were basically a 4-4-0 version of the WAGR's 4-6-0 G class, and identical to the South Australian Railways Z class, save for a bogie tender in place of the SAR six wheel tender. They entered service on the Eastern Goldfields Railway with P63 hauling the inaugural service from Coolgardie to Kalgoorlie in September 1896.

Both were sold in 1912 to the MRWA, however they were underpowered and after the delivery of its five new C class locomotives, were relegated to shunting duties at Midland Junction. In 1913, P62 commenced a 12-month lease to the Public Works Department. When it returned it was withdrawn and became a parts source for P63 which had been renumbered P12. Both were scrapped in 1929.

== See also ==
- List of Western Australian locomotive classes
- Locomotives of the Western Australian Government Railways
