= MRWA G class =

Class of Australian diesel-electric locomotives

Midland Railway of Western Australia G class
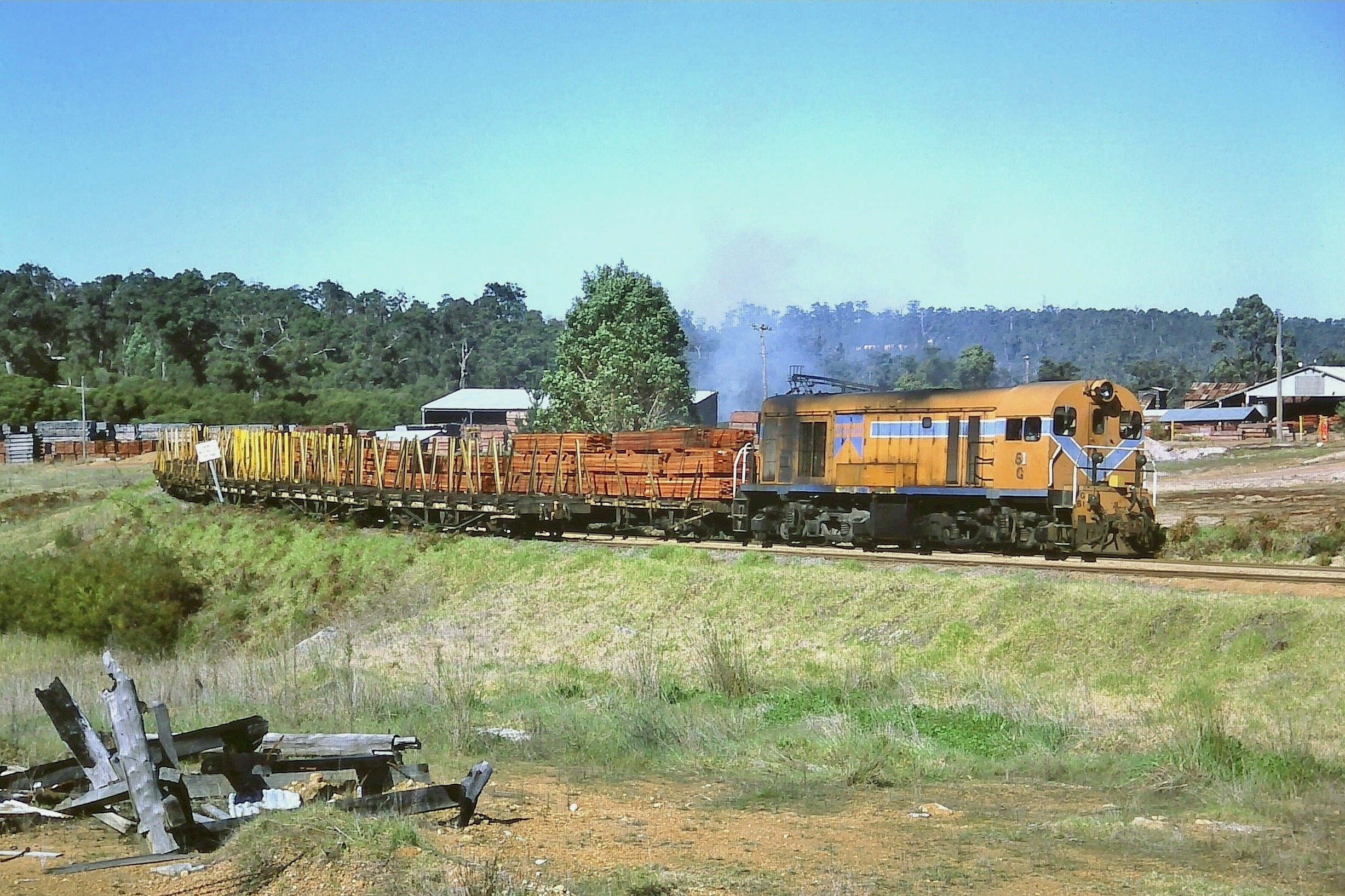
- G51 at Northcliffe in July 1986
Type and origin
- Power type: Diesel-electric
- Builder: English Electric, Rocklea
- Build date: 1963
- Total produced: 2
Specifications
- Configuration
  - AAR: C-C
  - UIC: Co-Co
- Gauge: 1,067 mm (3 ft 6 in)
- Wheel diameter: 3 ft 1 1/2 in (0.953 m)
- Minimum curve: 250 ft (76.200 m)
- Wheelbase: 32 ft (9.754 m) total, 11 ft 6 in (3.505 m) bogie
- Length: 41 ft (12.497 m) over headstocks
- Width: 8 ft 11 in (2.718 m)
- Height: 12 ft 7 in (3.835 m)
- Axle load: 12 1/2 long tons (12.7 t; 14.0 short tons)
- Loco weight: 75 long tons (76.2 t; 84.0 short tons)
- Fuel type: Diesel
- Fuel capacity: 700 imp gal (840 US gal; 3,200 L)
- Prime mover: English Electric 8SVT Mk II
- RPM range: 450–850 rpm
- Engine type: Four-stroke, four valves per cylinder
- Aspiration: turbocharged
- Generator: EE819/7E
- Traction motors: Six EE548A
- Cylinders: 8 Vee
- Cylinder size: 10 in × 12 in (254 mm × 305 mm)
- MU working: 110V, stepless electro-pneumatic throttle
- Loco brake: straight air
- Train brakes: vacuum
Performance figures
- Maximum speed: 55 miles per hour (89 km/h)
- Power output: 1,030 hp (770 kW) gross, 950 hp (710 kW) net
- Tractive effort: 43,000 lbf (191.3 kN) at 5.9 mph (10 km/h)
Career
- Operators: Midland Railway of Western Australia
- Number in class: 2
- Numbers: G50-G51
- First run: 7 May 1963
- Preserved: G50
- Disposition: 1 preserved, 1 scrapped

The G class were a class of diesel locomotives built by English Electric, Rocklea for the Midland Railway of Western Australia in 1963. They were later sold to the Western Australian Government Railways.

== History ==
The G class was a class of diesel-electric locomotives based upon the British Rail Class 20, with a cab similar to the Jamaican Railways Class 81 and its Australian derivatives. The two members of the class entered service with the Midland Railway of Western Australia in May 1963 after being shipped from Rocklea. They entered service on the Midland to Watheroo line.

Together with the rest of the company's assets and operations, they were taken over by the Western Australian Government Railways in 1964. In their later years they operated out of Bunbury and Perth.

== Disposal ==
G51 was withdrawn from service in May 1990, and scrapped in January 1991.

G50 was withdrawn in March 1991 and preserved by the Australian Railway Historical Society. As of 2014, it is on loan to the Hotham Valley Railway. G50 is operational as of July 2026.
