= MRWA E class =

Class of Australian diesel-hydraulic locomotive

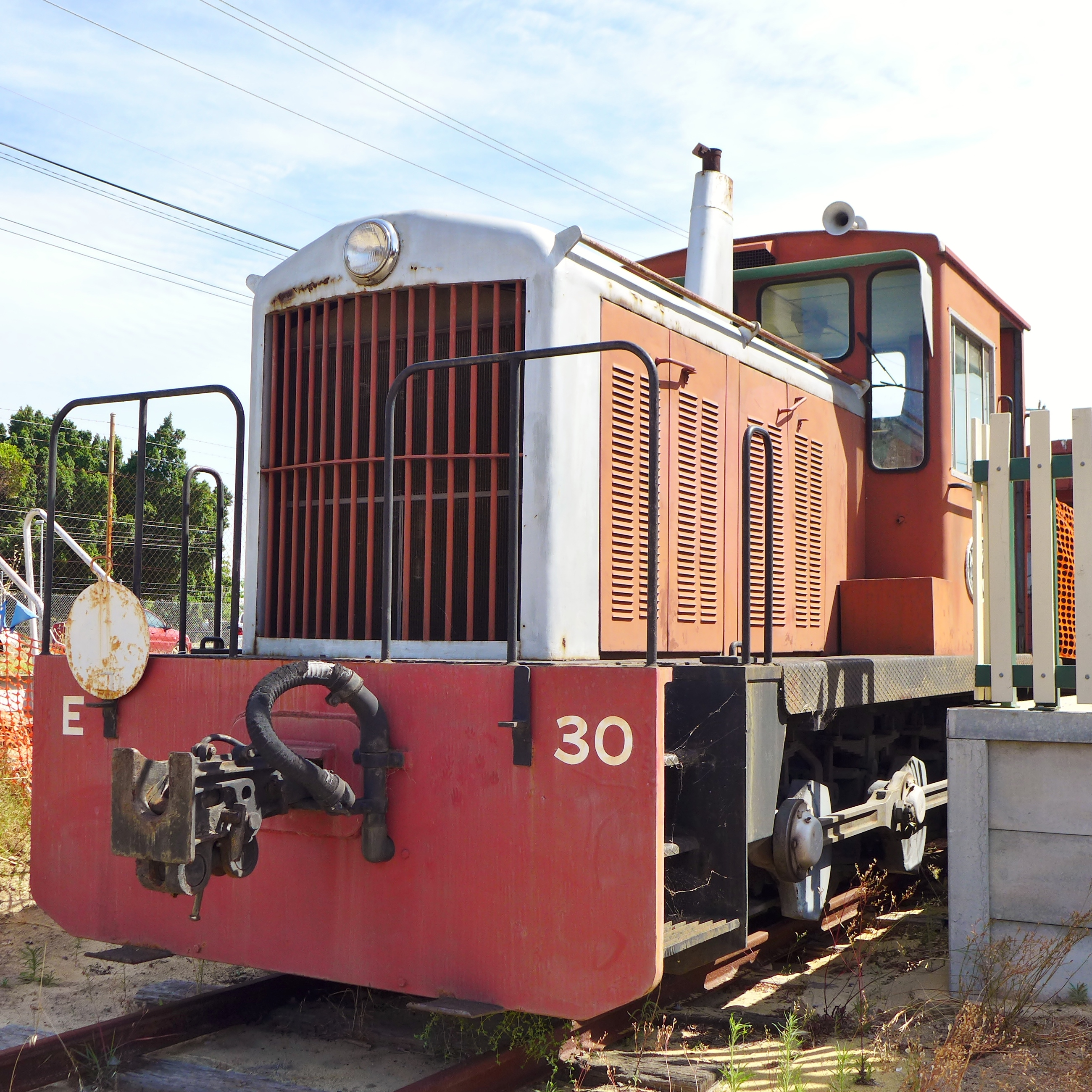
- E30 at the Railway Museum, Bassendean, 2014
Type and origin
- Power type: Diesel-hydraulic
- Builder: Commonwealth Engineering, Bassendean
- Total produced: 1
Specifications
- Configuration
  - AAR: C
  - UIC: C
- Gauge: 3 ft 6 in (1,067 mm)
- Wheelbase: 8 ft 6 in (2.59 m)
- Length: 18 ft 4 in (5.59 m) (over headstocks)
- Width: 7 ft 6 in (2.29 m)
- Height: 10 ft 7 in (3.23 m)
- Axle load: 10 long tons (10 t; 11 short tons)
- Loco weight: 26 long tons (26 t; 29 short tons)
- Fuel type: Diesel
- Fuel capacity: 96 imp gal (440 L; 115 US gal)
- Lubricant cap.: 7.5 imp gal (34 L; 9.0 US gal)
- Prime mover: Rolls-Royce C6SFL
- Engine type: Four-stroke diesel
- Aspiration: Supercharged
- Cylinders: 6
- Cylinder size: 5.125 in × 6 in (130.2 mm × 152.4 mm) (bore x stroke)
- Transmission: Twin disc type DF 11,500 Hydraulic converter
Performance figures
- Maximum speed: 25 mph (40 km/h)
- Power output: 250 hp (190 kW)
- Tractive effort: 18,000 lb_{f} (80 kN) (starting)
- Factor of adh.: 3.24
Career
- Operators: Midland Railway of Western Australia
- Number in class: 1
- Numbers: E30
- First run: February 1957
- Retired: 18 February 1983
- Disposition: Preserved

The MRWA E class was a single member class of diesel-hydraulic shunting (switching) locomotive built by Commonwealth Engineering, Bassendean, Western Australia, for the Midland Railway of Western Australia (MRWA) in 1957. The locomotive was later owned and operated by the MRWA's successor, the Western Australian Government Railways (WAGR).

== Service history ==
The single member of the class, E30, entered service with the MRWA in February 1957 as its first diesel powered locomotive. E30 also ended up being the company's only Western Australian made locomotive.

Together with the rest of the MRWA's assets and operations, E30 was taken over by the WAGR in 1964.

The locomotive was withdrawn from WAGR service on 18 February 1983, and has since been preserved at the Rail Heritage WA Railway Museum at Bassendean, Western Australia.

== See also ==
- List of Western Australian locomotive classes
- Locomotives of the Western Australian Government Railways
