= Midland railway line, Western Australia =

Regional railway line in Western Australia

Midland railway line
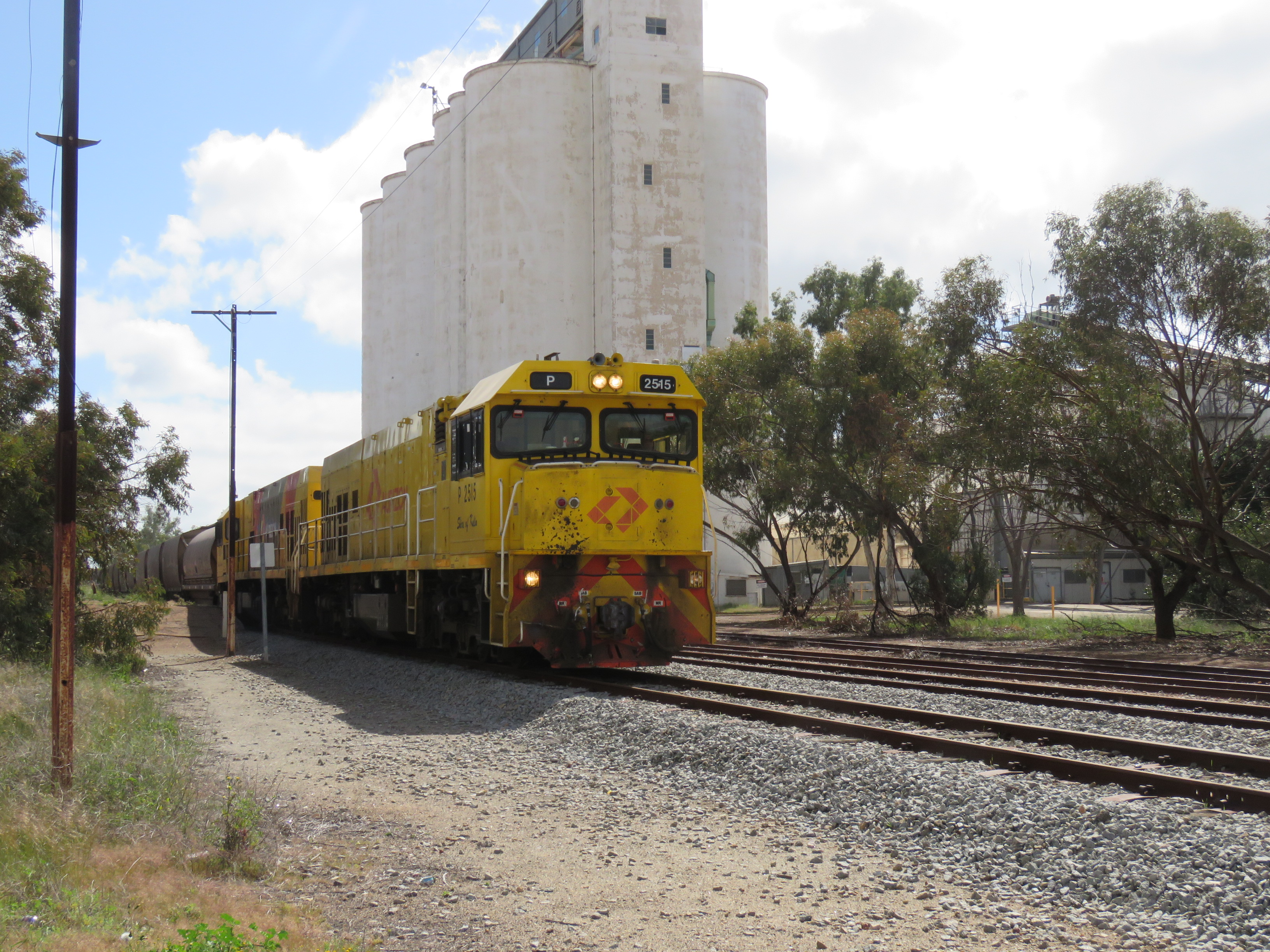
- The Westrail P class locomotives Shire of Kulin (2515) and Shire of Dalwallinu (2504) pulling a freight train past the Three Springs grain silos in August 2022

Overview
- Owner: Public Transport Authority
- Termini: Originally: Midland Junction Current: Millendon Junction; Originally: Walkaway Current: Narngulu
- Stations: 39

Service
- Operator(s): Arc Infrastructure

History
- Opened: November 1894

Technical
- Line length: Originally: 446 kilometres (277 mi) Current: 452 kilometres (281 mi)
- Track gauge: 1,067 mm (3 ft 6 in)
- Highest elevation: 323.6 m (1,062 ft)

The Midland railway line historically ran from Midland Junction to Walkaway (30 kilometres south of Geraldton) in Western Australia. Built by the Midland Railway of Western Australia, the 446-kilometre line opened in November 1894.

The contemporary railway line, operated by Arc Infrastructure, is referred to as the Millendon Junction to Narngulu railway line, and runs from Millendon Junction, on the Eastern Railway, to Narngulu on the Geraldton to Mullewa railway.

== History ==
=== As a private railway ===
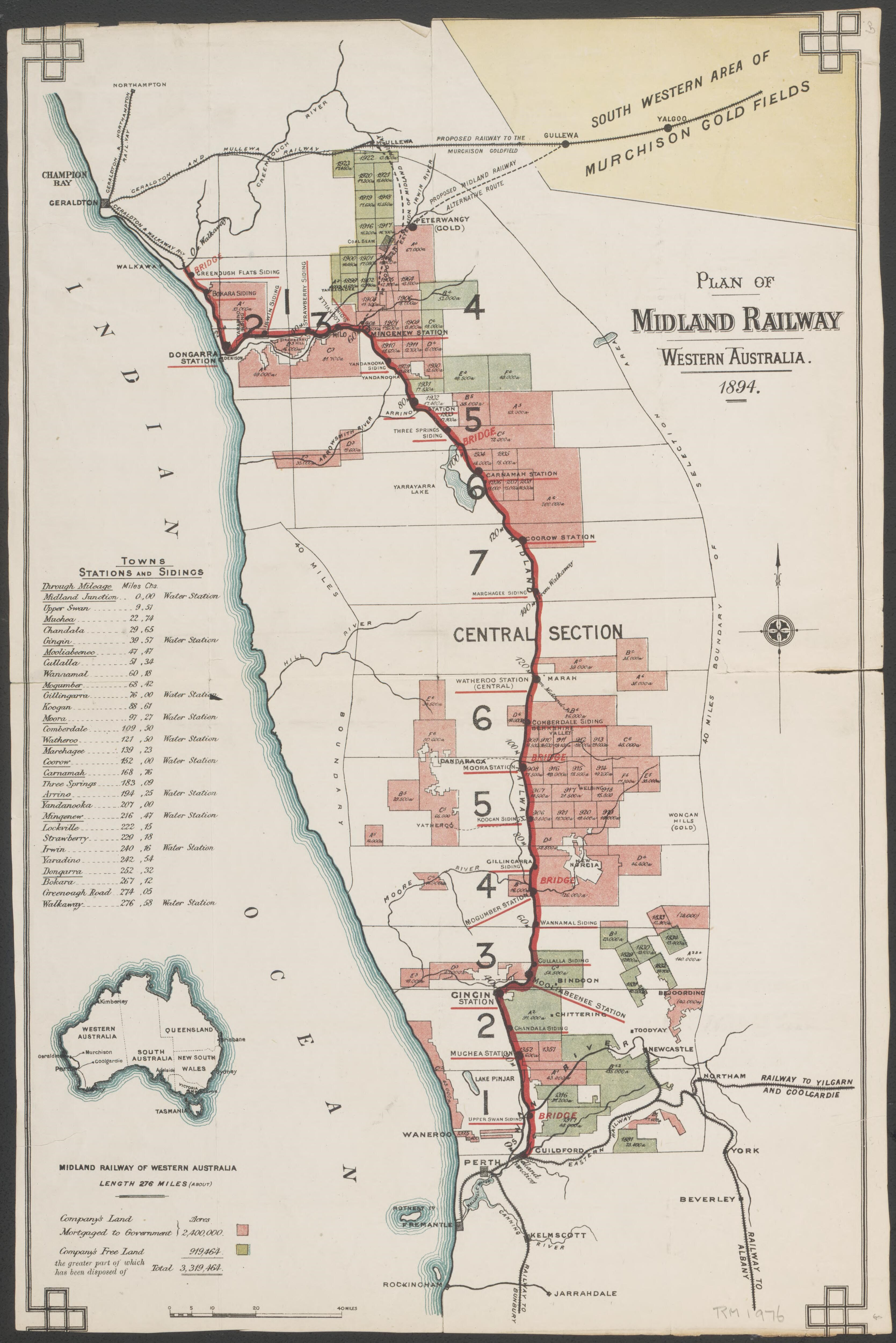
Map of the Midland railway line and adjacent country in 1894

In December 1883, John Waddington representing a syndicate of English capitalists, proposed to Governor Broome to build a line from York via Northam, Newcastle, Bejoording, New Norcia and along the Berkshire Valley to Geraldton under a land grant scheme. A parliamentary select committee recommended the route be altered to branch off from the Eastern Railway at Guildford and run via Chittering, Bindoon, Victoria Plains, Carnamah, Arrino, Upper Irwin and Dongara to Walkaway where it would join the Western Australian Government Railway’s line from Geraldton. The agreement was signed on 27 February 1886, with work commencing a few days later.

Under the land grant scheme, 12,000 acres (4,900 ha) of land was granted for every mile of railway completed, a total of 3,319,000 acres (1,343,000 ha). The consortium was able to select land within 40 miles (64 km) of the new railway. Financing problems delayed construction with construction being suspended in June 1887. The Government tried to rescind the contract, but could not as the consortium had until 1890 to complete the first 160 kilometres of the line.

On 21 March 1890, the Midland Railway Company of Western Australia was floated on the London Stock Exchange and Herbert Bond purchased John Waddington's shareholding in the consortium and work recommenced on the 446 kilometre line from both ends.

The first section from Midland Junction to Gingin opened on 9 April 1891, followed by Walkaway to Mingenew on 16 August 1891, Gin Gin to Moore River (Mogumbur) on 22 February 1892, Mingenew to Arrino on 25 February 1892, Mogumbur to Mora on 2 July 1894, with the two sections linked between Carnamah and Three Springs on 1 November 1894.

=== As a government railway ===
On 1 August 1964, the line was sold to the Western Australian Government Railways.

In April 1976, the Dongara–Eneabba railway line opened as a branch of the Midland railway line at Dongara.

=== Services in both eras ===
The Midland Railway of Western Australia operated a weekly passenger train in each direction. After the sale of the line to the Western Australian Government Railways, it was relaunched as The Midlander. It ceased on 28 July 1975.

Today the line is primarily utilised by CBH Group grain trains operating to the ports of Geraldton and Kwinana from eight receival points.

As of 2024, it is operated by Arc Infrastructure as the Millendon Junction to Narngulu railway line, connecting to the Geraldton to Mullewa line at Narngulu.

== Elevation ==
The railway line starts at an elevation of 21.5 metres (71 ft) at Millendon Junction and finishes at Narngulu at an elevation of 26.3 metres (86 ft). It reaches its lowest point of 5.9 metres (19 ft) at the 399.6-kilometre (248.3 mi) mark, north of Dongara, and its highest point of 323.6 metres (1,062 ft) at the 213.7-kilometre (132.8 mi) mark, just south of Marchagee.

== Incidents ==
On 24 July 1917, three people were killed and thirteen injured when the mail train from Perth to Geraldton derailed 2 miles (3.2 km) north of the siding at Gunyidi. One small child was killed on impact when the passenger carriages telescoped into the luggage van, while her mother and another man received severe injuries and died at the scene within hours. A coronial inquest found that excess rain and the absence of appropriate culverts had resulted in a washaway of the tracks.
