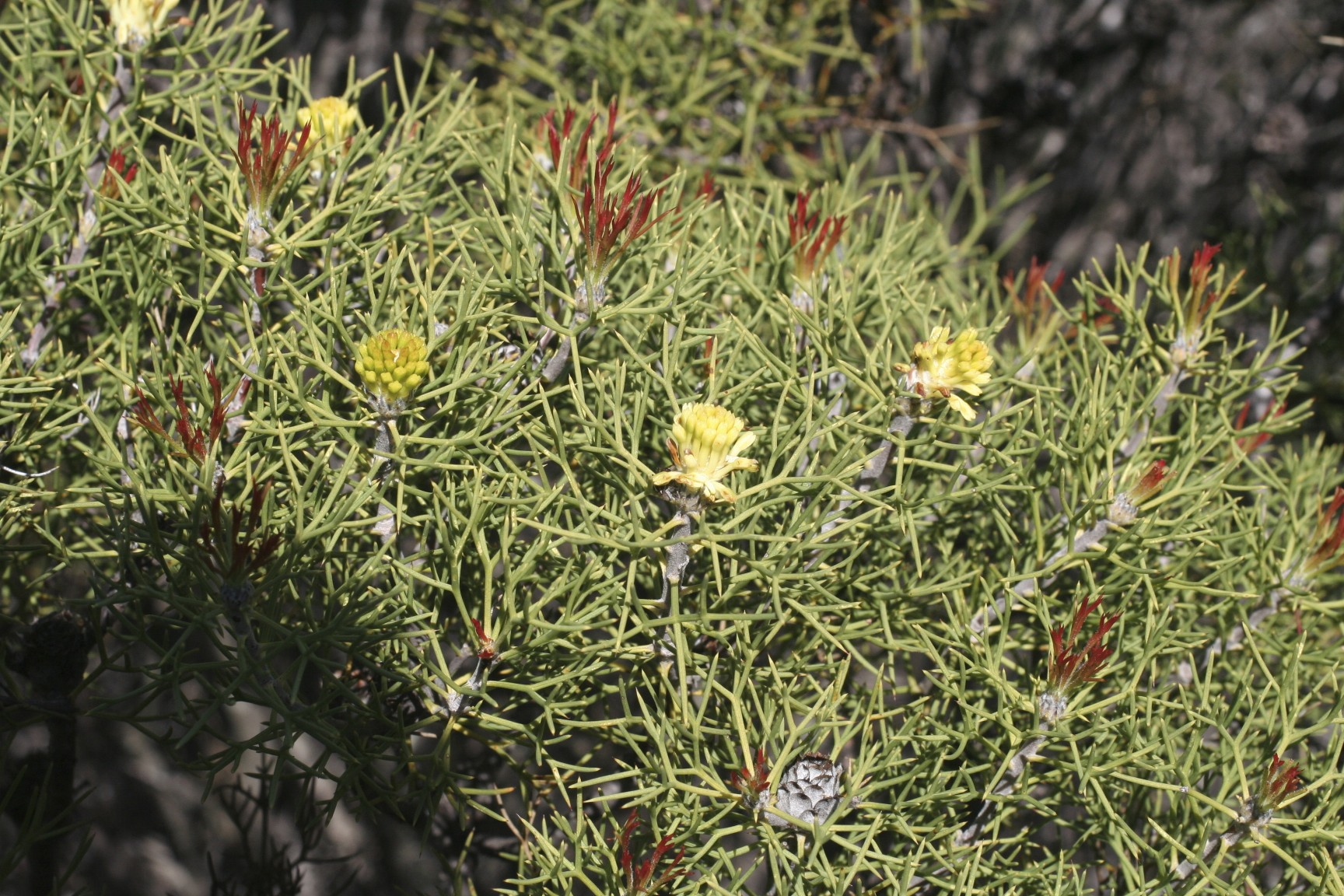
- Near Dandaragan

Conservation status
- Priority Three — Poorly Known Taxa (DEC)

Scientific classification
- Kingdom: Plantae
- Clade: Tracheophytes
- Clade: Angiosperms
- Clade: Eudicots
- Order: Proteales
- Family: Proteaceae
- Genus: Petrophile
- Species: P. biternata

Binomial name
- Petrophile biternata Meisn.

Synonyms
- Petrophila biternata Meisn. orth. var.

= Petrophile biternata =

Species of shrub endemic to Western Australia

Petrophile biternata is a species of flowering plant in the family Proteaceae and is endemic to the south-west of Western Australia. It is a shrub with biternate or pinnate, sharply-pointed leaves, and oval or spherical heads of glabrous, sticky, yellow flowers.

== Description ==
Petrophile biternata is a shrub that typically grows to a height of 1–2 m (3 ft 3 in – 6 ft 7 in) and has more or less glabrous branchlets. The leaves are biternate or pinnate, 20–70 mm (0.79–2.76 in) long on a petiole 12–28 mm (0.47–1.10 in) long with five to ten flat, sharply-pointed lobes. The flowers are arranged on the ends of branchlets in oval to spherical heads 20–25 mm (0.79–0.98 in) long, with short, sticky involucral bracts at the base. The flowers are 12–17 mm (0.47–0.67 in) long, yellow or creamy yellow, glabrous and sticky. Flowering occurs from August to October and the fruit is a nut, fused with others in an oval head about 25 mm (0.98 in) long.

== Taxonomy ==
Petrophile biternata was first formally described in 1855 by Carl Meissner in Hooker's Journal of Botany and Kew Garden Miscellany from material collected by James Drummond between the Moore and Murchison Rivers. The specific epithet (biternata) refers to the leaves.

== Distribution and habitat ==
This petrophile grows in shrubland and heath in scattered populations in the Moora-Watheroo areas and near New Norcia, in southwestern Western Australia.

== Conservation status ==
Petrophile biternata is classified as "Priority Three" by the Government of Western Australia Department of Parks and Wildlife meaning that it is poorly known and known from only a few locations but is not under imminent threat.
