= MRWA D class =

Class of Australian 4-8-0 locomotives

Midland Railway of Western Australia D Class
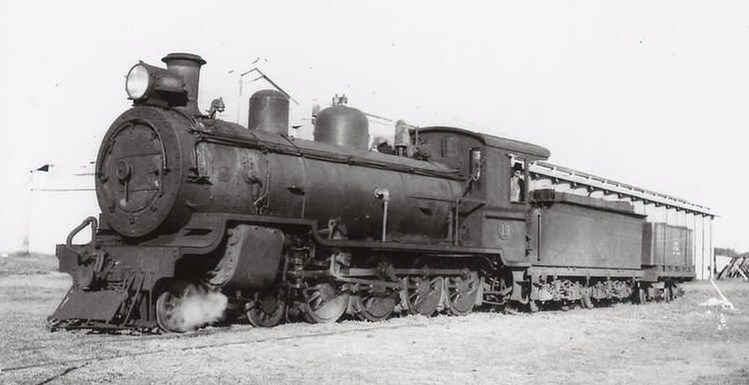
- D19 shunting at Arrino, 1943
Type and origin
- Power type: Steam
- Builder: Baldwin Locomotive Works, Philadelphia, USA
- Serial number: 53001–53002
Specifications
- Configuration
  - Whyte: 4-8-0
  - UIC: 2'D
- Gauge: 3 ft 6 in (1,067 mm)
- Driver dia.: 3 ft 10.5 in (1,181 mm)
- Length: 55 ft (16.76 m) (incl tender)
- Loco weight: 78.85 long tons (80.12 t; 88.31 short tons) (incl tender)
- Firebox
  - Grate area: 17 sq ft (1.6 m^{2})
- Boiler pressure: 160 psi (1,100 kPa)
- Cylinder size: 18 in × 23 in (457 mm × 584 mm)
Performance figures
- Tractive effort: 22,522 lb_{f} (100.18 kN)
Career
- Number in class: 2
- Numbers: D19 - D20
- First run: 1920

The MRWA D class was a class of 4-8-0 type steam locomotives built by Baldwin Locomotive Works in Philadelphia, USA, for the haulage of goods traffic on the Midland Railway of Western Australia (MRWA).

== Service history ==
The two members of the A class, nos D19 and D20, were ordered in 1919 and completed in 118 working days. They were dismantled, boxed, and shipped on 5 April 1920, before entering service later that year.

Both locomotives survived the dieselisation of the MRWA in 1958 as emergency power. They were written off in April 1963, and scrapped soon afterwards.

== See also ==
- List of Western Australian locomotive classes
- Locomotives of the Western Australian Government Railways
