= MRWA A class =

Class of Australian 2-8-2 locomotives

Midland Railway of Western Australia A class
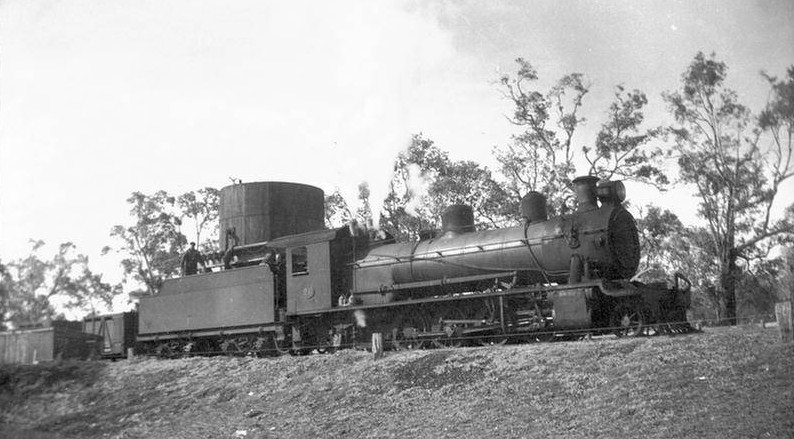
- A26 taking water at Gingin, 1943.
Type and origin
- Power type: Steam
- Builder: Kitson & Co., Leeds, England
- Serial number: 5397–5399, 5409–5411, 5429–5431
Specifications
- Configuration
  - Whyte: 2-8-2
  - UIC: 1'D1'
- Gauge: 3 ft 6 in (1,067 mm)
- Driver dia.: 3 ft 10.5 in (1,181 mm)
- Length: 62 ft 10.4 in (19.16 m) (incl tender)
- Loco weight: 90.4 long tons (91.9 t; 101.2 short tons) (incl tender)
- Firebox
  - Grate area: 28 sq ft (2.6 m^{2})
- Boiler pressure: 160 psi (1,100 kPa)
- Cylinder size: 18 in × 24 in (457 mm × 610 mm)
Performance figures
- Tractive effort: 22,743 lb_{f} (101.17 kN)
Career
- Number in class: 9
- Numbers: A21 - A29
- First run: 1926

The MRWA A class was a class of 2-8-2 steam locomotives built by Kitson & Co. in Leeds, England, for the Midland Railway of Western Australia (MRWA).

== Service history ==
The first three members of the A class, nos A21–A23, entered service in 1926. Two further batches of A class units followed, nos A24–A26 in 1927 and A27–A29 in 1929.

Withdrawals began in 1957, with A25 being the first to go. The others were withdrawn in 1958, and all were sold and cut up for scrap in 1959.

== See also ==
- List of Western Australian locomotive classes
- Locomotives of the Western Australian Government Railways
