= HVTR =

HVTR may refer to:

- Hotham Valley Railway
- High Voltage Arc Tracking Rate is the rate, as defined by UL 746A, that a high voltage can travel across a plastic material.
