= Acacia erioclada =

Scientific classification
- Kingdom: Plantae
- Clade: Tracheophytes
- Clade: Angiosperms
- Clade: Eudicots
- Clade: Rosids
- Order: Fabales
- Family: Fabaceae
- Subfamily: Caesalpinioideae
- Clade: Mimosoid clade
- Genus: Acacia
- Species: A. erioclada

Binomial name
- Acacia erioclada Benth.

Synonyms
- Racosperma eriocladum (Benth.) Pedley

Species of legume

Acacia erioclada is a species of flowering plant in the family Fabaceae and is endemic to the south-west of Western Australia. It is an intricately branched, spreading shrub with spiny branchlets covered with woolly to soft hairs at first, curved, narrowly elliptic to narrowly oblong phyllodes, spherical heads of golden yellow flowers, and narrowly oblong, firmly leathery pods.

== Description ==
Acacia erioclada is an intricately branched, spreading shrub that typically grows to a height of up to 50 cm (20 in) tall, and has spiny branchlets covered with woolly to soft hairs at first, later glabrous. The phyllodes are curved, narrowly elliptic to narrowly oblong, 4–7.5 mm (0.16–0.30 in) long, 1–2 mm (0.039–0.079 in) wide and sharply pointed with a more or less prominent midrib. There are bristly to narrowly triangular stipules at the base of the phyllodes. The flowers are borne in a spherical head in axils on a peduncle 1.5–8 mm (0.059–0.315 in) long, each head with 18 to 22 golden yellow flowers. Flowering occurs from June to July, and the pods are narrowly oblong, up to 30 mm (1.2 in) long and 2.0–2.5 mm (0.079–0.098 in) wide, tan and glabrous to subglabrous and firmaly leathery. The seeds are oblong, 2.2–2.7 mm (0.087–0.106 in) long, turgid and tan with an aril.

== Taxonomy ==
Acacia erioclada was first formally described in 1855 by George Bentham in the journal Linnaea: ein Journal für die Botanik in ihrem ganzen Umfange, oder Beiträge zur Pflanzenkunde from specimens collected by James Drummond. The specific epithet (erioclada) means 'woolly' referring to the young shoots and branches.

== Distribution and habitat ==
This species of wattle grows in sand in heath or in rocky clay in scattered locations from near Watheroo and south-east to near Bruce Rock in the Avon Wheatbelt, Geraldton Sandplains and Jarrah Forest bioregions in the south-west of Western Australia.

== Conservation status ==
Acacia erioclada is listed as "not threatened" by the Government of Western Australia Department of Biodiversity, Conservation and Attractions.

== See also ==
- List of Acacia species
