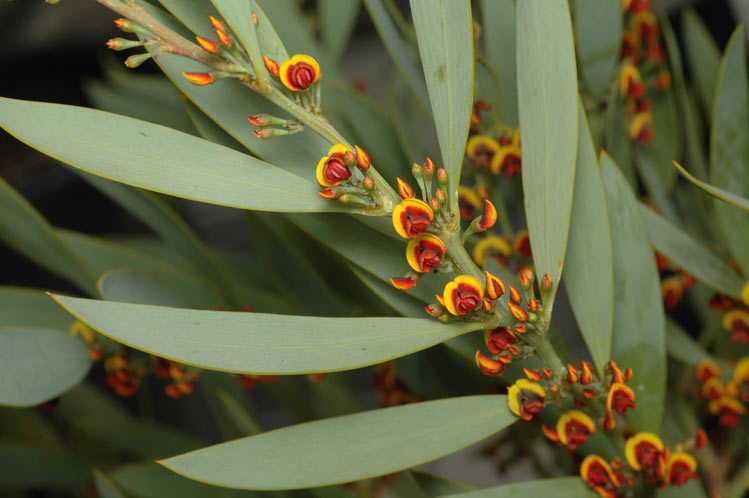
- In the Australian National Botanic Gardens

Scientific classification
- Kingdom: Plantae
- Clade: Tracheophytes
- Clade: Angiosperms
- Clade: Eudicots
- Clade: Rosids
- Order: Fabales
- Family: Fabaceae
- Subfamily: Faboideae
- Genus: Daviesia
- Species: D. daphnoides

Binomial name
- Daviesia daphnoides Meisn.

= Daviesia daphnoides =

Species of flowering plant

Daviesia daphnoides is a species of flowering plant in the family Fabaceae and is endemic to the south-west of Western Australia. It is a bushy or spreading shrub with glabrous foliage, sharply-pointed narrow elliptic to egg-shaped phyllodes with the narrower end towards the base and yellow and dark red flowers.

== Description ==
Daviesia daphnoides is a bushy or spreading shrub that typically grows to a height of up to 1.5 m (4 ft 11 in) and has ridged branchlets and glabrous foliage. Its leaves are reduced to more or less erect, narrow elliptic to egg-shaped phyllodes with the narrower end towards the base, 28–68 mm (1.1–2.7 in) long and 4.5–9 mm (0.18–0.35 in) wide. The flowers are arranged in groups of two to six in leaf axils on a peduncle 0.5–4.5 mm (0.020–0.177 in) long, each flower on a pedicel 0.75–3.0 mm (0.030–0.118 in) long with oblong to triangular bracts at the base. The sepals are about 4 mm (0.16 in) long and joined at the base, the two upper lobes joined for most of their length and the lower three triangular and 0.25–0.75 mm (0.0098–0.0295 in) long. The standard is yellow with a dark red base, 5.0–5.75 mm (0.197–0.226 in) long and 5–6 mm (0.20–0.24 in) wide, the wings dull red and yellow, 5.5–6.0 mm (0.22–0.24 in) long and the keel dark red and about 4 mm (0.16 in) long. Flowering occurs from April to July and the fruit is a triangular pod 15–21 mm (0.59–0.83 in) long with a tapering tip.

== Taxonomy and naming ==
Daviesia daphnoides was first formally described in 1844 by Carl Meissner in Lehmann's Plantae Preissianae from specimens collected by James Drummond in 1840. The specific epithet (daphnoiides) means "Daphne-like".

== Distribution and habitat ==
This species of pea grows in kwongan heathland from Walkaway to near Perth in the Avon Wheatbelt, Geraldton Sandplains and Jarrah Forest biogeographic regions of south-western Western Australia.

== Conservation status ==
Daviesia daphnoides is classified as "not threatened" by the Government of Western Australia Department of Biodiversity, Conservation and Attractions.
