= MRWA F class =

Class of Australian diesel-electric locomotives

Midland Railway of Western Australia F class
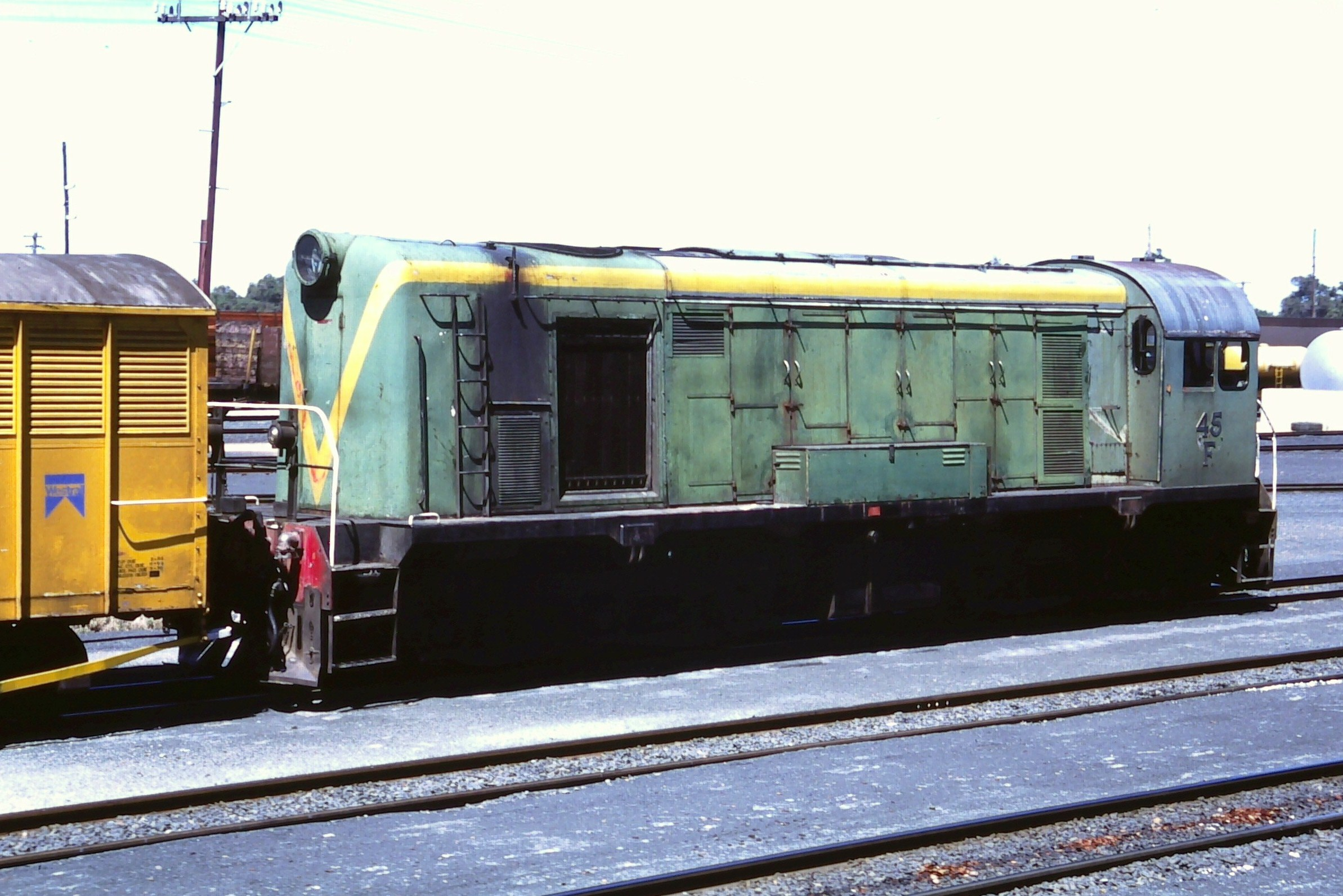
- F45 at Picton Yard in March 1986
Type and origin
- Power type: Diesel-electric
- Builder: English Electric, Rocklea
- Build date: 1958
- Total produced: 7
Specifications
- Configuration
  - AAR: A1A-A1A
  - UIC: (A1A)(A1A)
- Gauge: 1,067 mm (3 ft 6 in)
- Wheel diameter: 3 ft 1 1/2 in (0.953 m)
- Minimum curve: 330 ft (100.584 m)
- Wheelbase: 34 ft (10.363 m) total, 11 ft 6 in (3.505 m) bogie
- Length: 42 ft (12.802 m) over headstocks
- Width: 8 ft 10 1/2 in (2.705 m)
- Height: 13 ft 7 in (4.140 m)
- Axle load: 10.7 long tons (10.9 t; 12.0 short tons)
- Loco weight: 63 long tons (64.0 t; 70.6 short tons)
- Fuel type: Diesel
- Fuel capacity: 500 imp gal (2,300 L)
- Lubricant cap.: 90 imp gal (410 L)
- Coolant cap.: 88 imp gal (400 L)
- Prime mover: English Electric 6SRKT Mk II
- RPM range: 450–850 rpm
- Engine type: Four-stroke diesel, four valves per cylinder
- Aspiration: Turbocharged
- Generator: English Electric 827/4C
- Traction motors: English Electric 525/9A
- Cylinders: 6 Inline
- Cylinder size: 10 in × 12 in (254 mm × 305 mm)
- MU working: 110V, stepless electro-pneumatic throttle
- Loco brake: Air
- Train brakes: Vacuum
Performance figures
- Maximum speed: 50 miles per hour (80 km/h)
- Power output: 750 hp (560 kW) gross, 685 hp (510 kW) net
- Tractive effort: 22,400 lbf (99.6 kN) at 9.6 mph (20 km/h)
Career
- Operators: Midland Railway of Western Australia
- Number in class: 7
- Numbers: F40-F46
- Delivered: May 1958
- Preserved: F40, F41, F43, F44
- Disposition: 4 preserved, 3 scrapped

The F class were a class of diesel locomotives built by English Electric, Rocklea for the Midland Railway of Western Australia in 1958. They were later taken over by the Western Australian Government Railways.

== History ==
The F class was based upon the South Australian Railways 800 class. The seven members of the class entered service with the Midland Railway of Western Australia in 1958, and, together with the rest of the company's assets and operations, were taken over by the Western Australian Government Railways in 1964.

The first (F42) was withdrawn in November 1984.

Hotham Valley Railway have preserved F40 and F44 while Rail Heritage WA have F43. F41 is also on display at Moora.

== Status Table ==
Key:	Converted	Preserved	Scrapped

Serial Number	Date Built	Original Number	Previous Owner/s	Current/Last Owner	Status
		F40	MRWA, WAGR/Westrail, (Unknown), South Spur Rail Services, Engenco	Privately Owned	Preserved, Operational
		F41	MRWA, WAGR/Westrail	Shire of Moora	Preserved
		F42	MRWA	Westrail	Scrapped
		F43	MRWA, WAGR/Westrail	Rail Heritage WA	Preserved
		F44	MRWA, WAGR/Westrail, Alcoa, Privately Owned	Hotham Valley Railway	Converted to power sludge pump at Alcoa. Minus bogies on flat wagon.
		F45	MRWA	Westrail	Scrapped
		F46	MRWA	Westrail	Scrapped
