= MRWA C class =

Class of Australian 4-6-2 locomotives

Midland Railway of Western Australia C class
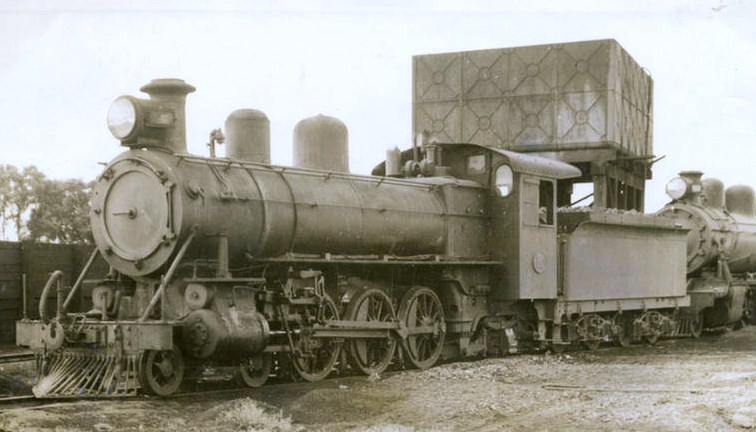
- C16 in the MRWA yard at Midland Junction
Type and origin
- Power type: Steam
- Builder: Kitson & Co., Leeds, England
Specifications
- Configuration
  - Whyte: 4-6-2
  - UIC: 2'C1'
- Gauge: 3 ft 6 in (1,067 mm)
- Driver dia.: 4 ft 1 in (1,245 mm)
- Loco weight: 77 long tons (78 t; 86 short tons) (original); 77.14 long tons (78.38 t; 86.40 short tons) (superheated)
- Firebox
  - Grate area: 21.14 sq ft (1.964 m^{2})
- Boiler pressure: 160 psi (1,100 kPa)
- Cylinder size: 16.5 in × 22 in (419 mm × 559 mm)
Performance figures
- Power output: 660 hp (490 kW)
- Tractive effort: 15,646 lb_{f} (69.60 kN) (original); 16,634 lb_{f} (73.99 kN) (superheated)
Career
- Number in class: 5
- Numbers: C11 - C15 (original); C14 - C18 (later)
- First run: 1958

The MRWA C class was a class of steam locomotives built by Kitson & Co. in Leeds, England, for the Midland Railway of Western Australia (MRWA). The class's wheel arrangement was 4-6-2. The five members of the class entered service in 1912 and worked on the MRWA until the 1950s.

== See also ==
- List of Western Australian locomotive classes
- Locomotives of the Western Australian Government Railways
