= Midland Railway of Western Australia =

Former railway company in Western Australia

Midland Railway Company of Western Australia
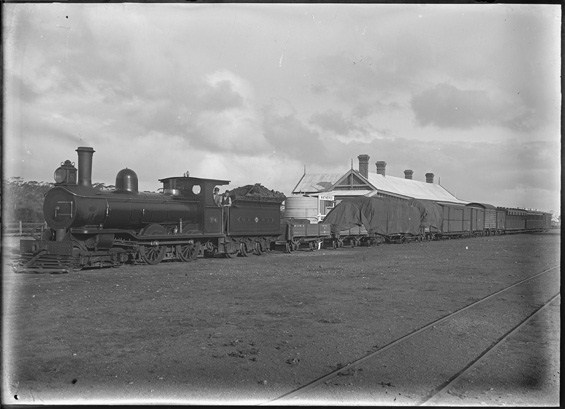
- B6 with a mixed train at Watheroo, ca 1910
- Industry: Railway operator
- Founded: 21 March 1890
- Defunct: 31 July 1964
- Fate: purchased by Western Australian Government Railways
- Headquarters: London
- Area served: Western Australia
- Number of employees: 472 (1963)

The Midland Railway of Western Australia (MRWA) was a railway company that built and operated the Midland line in Western Australia. It was listed on the London Stock Exchange. Although having its headquarters in London, it had no association with the English Midland Railway.

== History ==
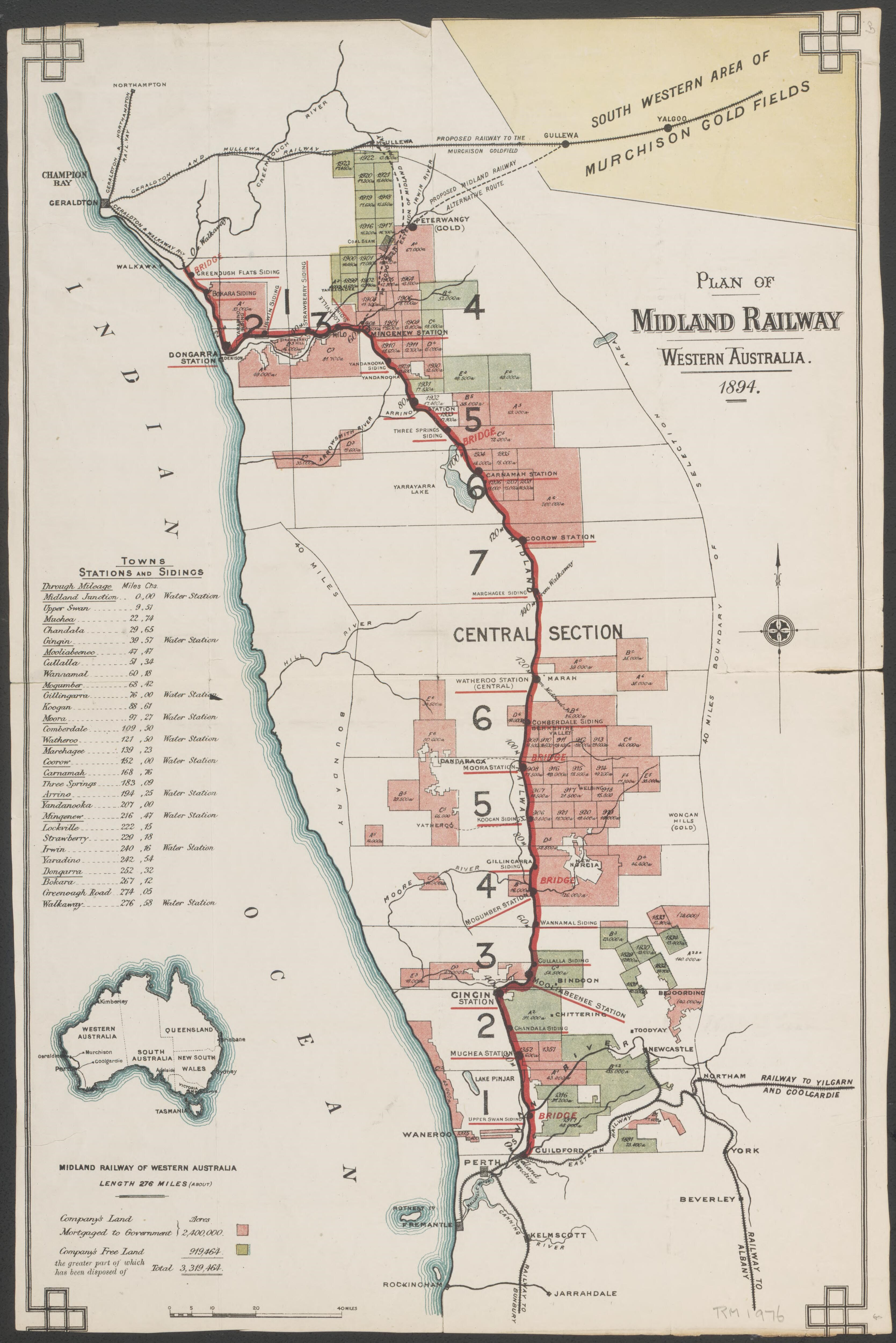
Map of the Midland line

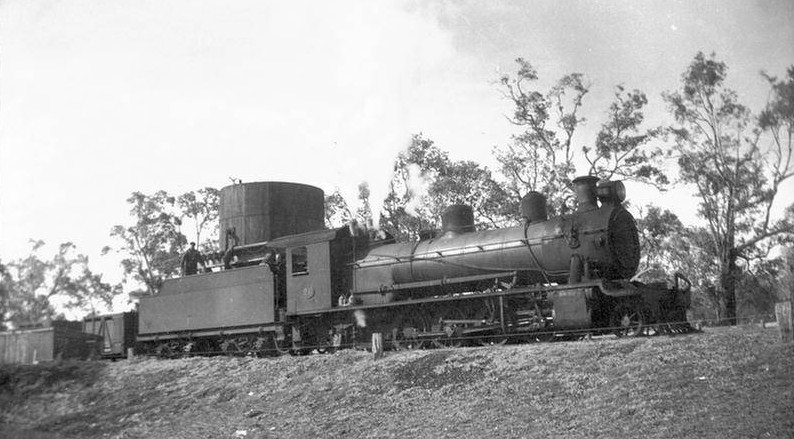
A26 at Gingin in 1943

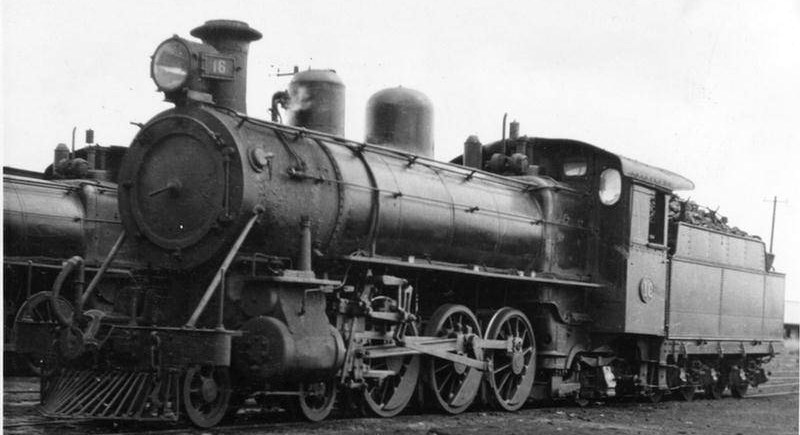
C16 at Midland Junction in 1949

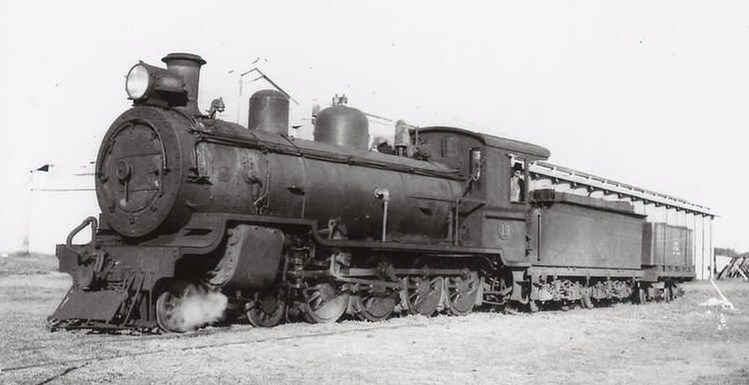
D19 at Arrino in May 1943

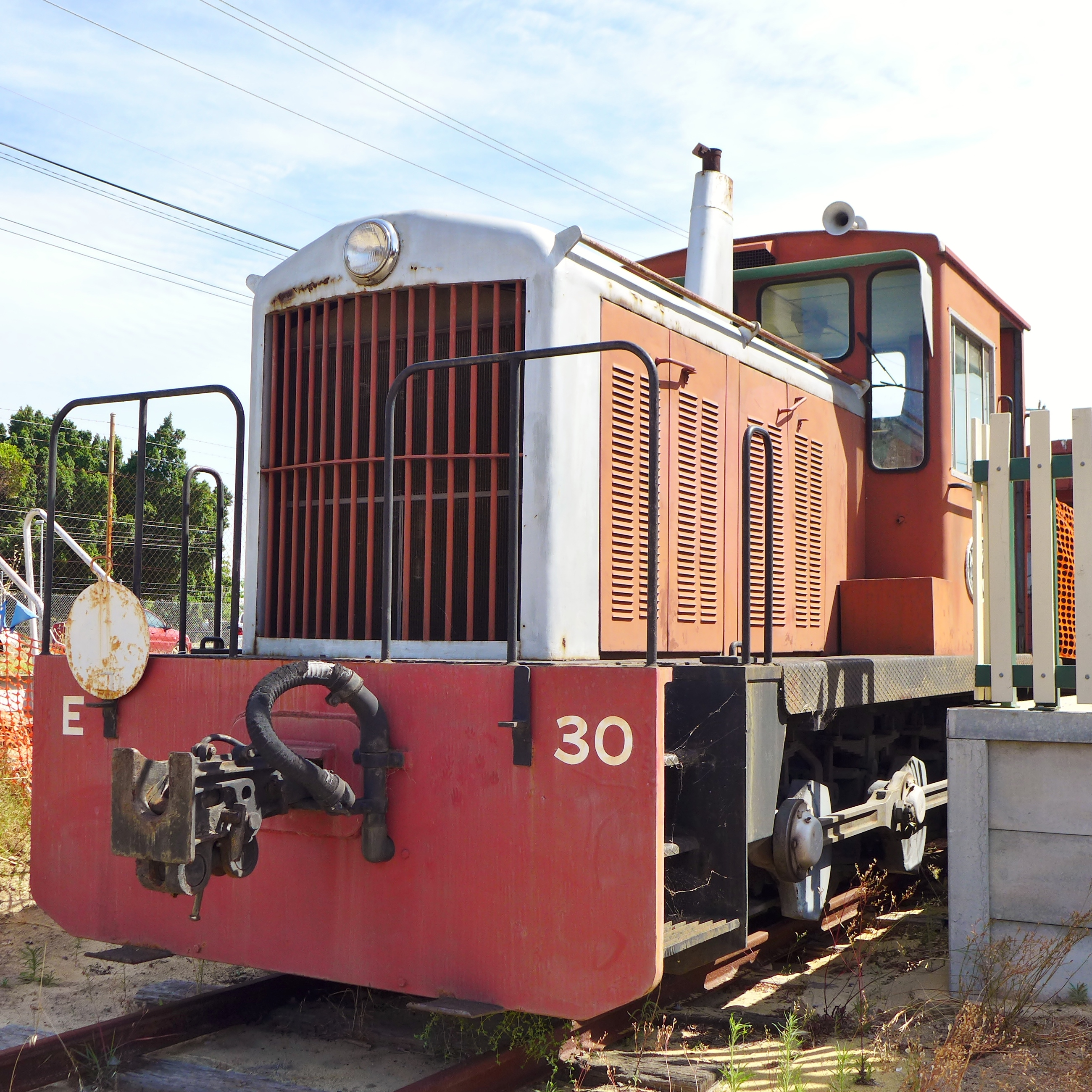
Preserved E30 at the Western Australian Rail Transport Museum, Bassendean in November 2014

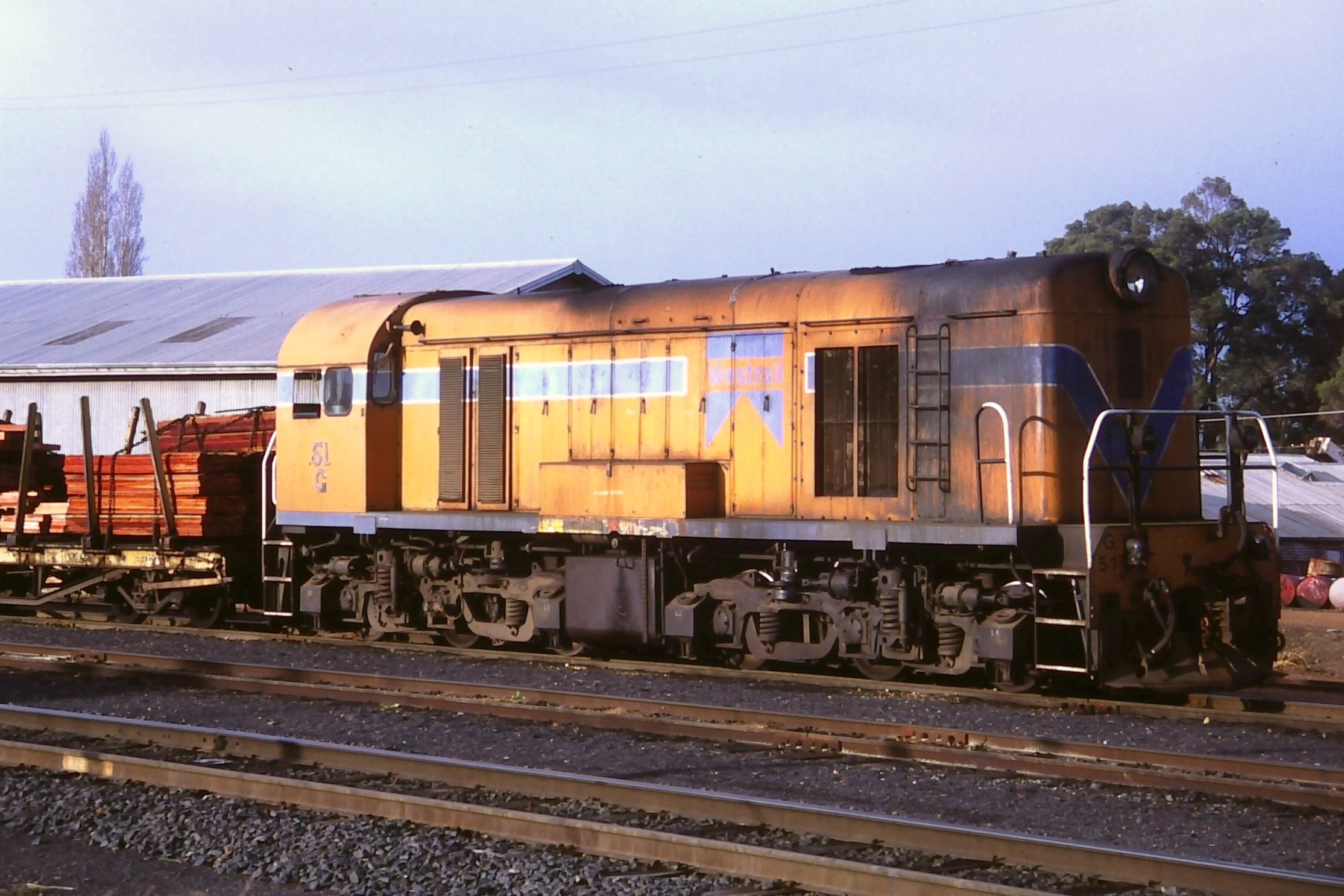
G51 in Westrail livery at Manjimup in 1986

In December 1883, John Waddington representing a syndicate of English capitalists, proposed to Governor Broome to build a line from York via Northam, Newcastle, Bejoording, New Norcia and along the Berkshire Valley to Geraldton under a land grant scheme. A parliamentary select committee recommended the route be altered to branch off from the Eastern Railway at Guildford and run via Chittering, Bindoon, Victoria Plains, Carnamah, Arrino, Upper Irwin and Dongara to Walkaway where it would join the Western Australian Government Railway's line from Geraldton. The agreement was signed on 27 February 1886, with work commencing a few days later.

Under the land grant scheme, 12,000 acres (4,900 ha) of land was granted for every mile of railway completed, a total of 3,319,000 acres (1,343,000 ha). The consortium was able to select land within 40 miles (64 km) of the new railway. Financing problems delayed construction with construction being suspended in June 1887. The Government tried to rescind the contract, but could not as the consortium had until 1890 to complete the first 160 kilometres of the line.

On 21 March 1890, the Midland Railway Company of Western Australia was floated on the London Stock Exchange and Herbert Bond purchased John Waddington's shareholding in the consortium and work recommenced on the 446 kilometre line from both ends.

The first section from Midland Junction to Gingin opened on 9 April 1891, followed by Walkaway to Mingenew on 16 August 1891. The rest of the line opened in stages until the two sections met on 1 November 1894.

Between 1905 and 1918, the company actively pursued a scheme of land classification and settlement led by land agent and politician James Gardiner. The first subdivision was auctioned at Moora on 22 June 1906.^{[4]} By 1911, 16 subdivisions between Midland Junction and Dongara had been classified and auctioned. From 1910, Gardiner managed the Ready Made Farms Scheme, which provided cleared and fenced farms with houses to prospective settlers.^{[5]} The townsites of Coorow, Winchester and Carnamah formed the backbone of the scheme. The scheme was advertised widely to British citizens and was moderately successful, with 35 of the 58 farms sold by the end of 1915.^{[6]}

In 1915, the Western Australian Government Railways opened the parallel, but longer Northern Railway route about 50 kilometres further east via Wongan Hills and Mullewa.

Between 1914 and 1917, business declined rapidly and the company operated at a loss. This was brought on by decreased revenue owing to the construction of the Northern Railway (which captured railway traffic from the Midland Railway), crop losses due to drought, the loss of men from districts owing to World War I, and the imposition of new federal taxes. In 1918, the land settlement scheme was wound up.^{[7]}

In 1922, the MRWA made the first of a number of proposals for the Western Australian Government Railways to purchase it. In December 1962, with much of the track and rolling stock in need of replacement, the company entered negotiations for the WAGR to purchase the business. This was concluded in December 1963, with the sale effective 1 August 1964.

== Passenger service ==
Up until its cessation, a weekly passenger service operated over the line.

== Road Service Department ==
In 1946, the Midland Railway Company began operating a bus service between Perth and Geraldton. Buses to conduct wildflower tours. In 1948, it began operating Wildflower Study Tours from Perth and along roads to and from Geraldton through the northern wheatbelt. Also in 1948, it began operating truck services. By 1962, seven road coaches, six trucks and two prime movers were operated.

== Workshops ==
The Midland Railway established its workshops and headquarters at Midland Junction. Later on, in 1904, the WAGR relocated their workshops from its overcrowded site at Fremantle to Midland also.

The site of the Midland Railway Company Workshops. A different and separate workshops north west and the other side of the main rail corridor from the Midland Railway Workshops and marshalling yard (which actually worked across the Great Eastern Highway next to the town Post Office) is now the location of the Centrepoint shopping centre and its car-park.

== Rolling stock ==
In 1936, the MRWA owned 23 locomotives, 23 carriages and 523 freight wagons. At the time of the sale, the MRWA operated nine diesel locomotives, 10 passenger carriages and 602 freight wagons.

=== Steam locomotives ===
The MRWA operated nine A, nine B, five C and two D class locomotives. All were withdrawn from service in the 1950s.

B6 was placed on a plinth in a park in Geraldton as a display, but in 2000, was removed due to poor condition and road transported to Midland Railway Workshops for possible restoration by members of Rail Heritage WA. However, the group could not proceed with the work required, and were required to vacate the workshops site to allow the site to be redeveloped, with B6 moving to the Western Australian Rail Transport Museum, Bassendean. It has since moved to Walkaway.

=== Diesel locomotives ===
In 1957, MRWA took delivery of its first diesel powered locomotive in the form of diesel mechanical shunting unit E30. A year later the first of seven F class mainline diesel electric units entered service. In 1963, two G class were delivered but due to their axle loading were restricted to working between Midland Junction and Watheroo.

=== Survivors ===
- B6 stored at Walkaway
- E30 preserved at Western Australian Rail Transport Museum, Bassendean
- F40 operational with Hotham Valley Railway, Pinjarra
- F41 static display within the Moora Railway Reserve near station
- F43 preserved at Western Australian Rail Transport Museum, Bassendean
- G50 operational with Hotham Valley Railway, Pinjarra, owned by Rail Heritage WA

== Revival ==
In 2002, the name was revived by South Spur Rail Services for a restaurant train business that ran the Spirit of the West for a number of years.

== See also ==
- Great Southern Railway (Western Australia) – land development section
- Rail transport in Western Australia

== General references ==
- 'Midland Railway Company', in J.S. Battye, Cyclopedia of Western Australia, p. 474.
- Appleyard, R.T. (1 December 1981). "Western Australia: Economic and demographic growth 1850–1914". In C. T. Stannage (ed.). A New History of Western Australia. Nedlands: UWA Publishing. p. 216. ISBN 0-85564-181-9. LCCN 82101009. OCLC 963830667. OL 3517729M. Wikidata Q125995168.
- The Midland Railway Company of Western Australia Ltd, London, 1914, MN239/2, PR4983/23: Battye Library.
- Midland Railway Co., 1914.
- Dornan G. n.d., 'The Early History of the Midland Railway Company', unpub. thesis; Battye Library.
- Dornan G. n.d., 'The Early History of the Midland Railway Company', unpub. thesis; Battye Library.
- Midland Railway Co., London, Minute Book No. 8, p. 201, MN239/1, 1558A/3-8: Battye Library.
