= The Westland (periodical) =

Former Australian railway magazine published by Rail Heritage WA

The Westland was a magazine mainly devoted to historic railway operations in Western Australia, with items relating to current operations included. It was based in Perth.

== History ==
The Westland's earliest form was with the title Westland Express. Between 1973 and 1984 it was known as The Westlander.

The new title, The Westland, was utilised in January 1985.

The magazine was published by Rail Heritage WA, the Western Australian branch of the Australian Railway Historical Society. From February 2008, it began to be published quarterly. As of June 2012, 270 editions had been published.

It derives its name from The Westland, the overnight passenger service between Kalgoorlie and Perth on the Western Australian Government Railways that operated between 1938 and 1969.

Some magazine issues also used to commemorate special anniversaries of specific railway lines/services, as well as those relating to the organization.

It occasionally included reviews of books and media related to railways.

There have been no further issues since the 2018/2019 edition.
