= Hotham Valley Railway =

Tourist and heritage railway in Western Australia

Hotham Valley Tourist Railway
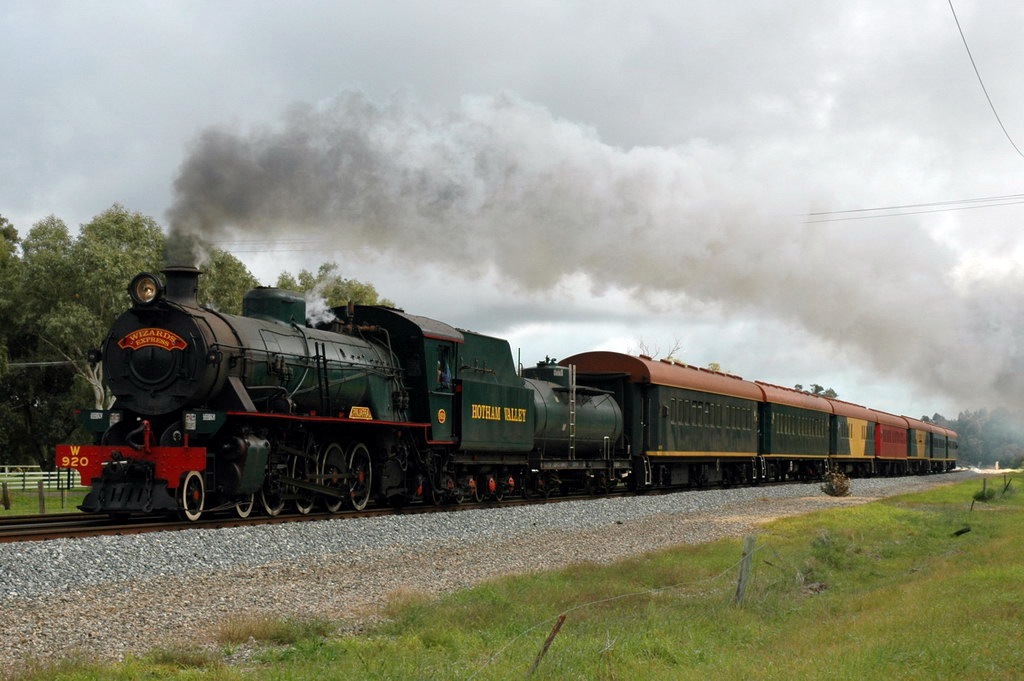
- W920 at Wellard in July 2005
- Terminus: Pinjarra; 32°37′48″S 115°52′16″E

Commercial operations
- Name: Hotham Branch
- Built by: Western Australian Government Railways
- Original gauge: 1,067 mm (3 ft 6 in)

Preserved operations
- Owned by: Hotham Valley Tourist Railway (WA) Inc
- Operated by: Hotham Valley Tourist Railway (WA) Inc
- Stations: 3
- Preserved gauge: 1,067 mm (3 ft 6 in)
- 1910: Opened Pinjarra to Holyoake
- 1913: Extended to Dwarda
- 1926: Extended to Narrogin
- 1961: Section closed: Boddington–Narrogin
- 1969: Section closed: Dwellingup–Boddington
- 1984: Westrail services cease

Preservation history
- 1974: Preservation society formed
- 1976: Heritage railway operations commenced (Pinjarra–Dwellingup)
- 1986: Forest Railway reopened (Dwellingup–Etmilyn )
- Headquarters: Dwellingup

Website
- www.hothamvalleyrailway.com.au

The Hotham Valley Tourist Railway (commonly Hotham Valley Railway) is a tourist and heritage railway in the Peel region of Western Australia.

The railway operates over a 32-kilometre-long (20 mi) section of the original Pinjarra to Narrogin railway line, and has its origins in a small group of enthusiasts who met together in 1974 with the object of preserving both Western Australian steam locomotives and the railway line itself, from Pinjarra at least as far as Dwellingup. Dwellingup is now the primary centre of Hotham Valley's operations.

Today the railway operates both steam and diesel locomotive hauled trains on a variety of services and is staffed almost exclusively by volunteers.

It is one of only a handful of heritage railway organisations in Western Australia, and as of 2018 is the only heritage and tourist railway in the state regularly operating original 1,067 mm (3 ft 6 in) gauge Western Australian Government Railways steam locomotives.

It celebrated its 50th Anniversary on 8 September 2024.

== History ==
In 1974, four local residents of Pinjarra formed the Pinjarra Steam & Hills Railway Preservation Society that later became the Hotham Valley Tourist Railway with the aim of operating steam trains on the Pinjarra to Narrogin railway line.

Initially four former Western Australian Government Railways W class locomotives were purchased. The first three (W920, W903 and W945) were returned to service in the 1970s, followed by the fourth (W908) in 1988. A fifth W class was purchased in 2013 (W947). Eight former Albany Progress carriages were leased and ultimately purchased outright in 1979.

In March 1976, the former Pinjarra Locomotive Depot was leased, officially opening on 17 July 1977. On 12 September 1976 the first train operated, a special from Perth to Dwellingup hauled by W920.

== Appeals ==
Hotham Valley Railway host a number of appeals, some of which are ongoing. The appeals relate generally to restoration projects but have included an appeal to replace the seats in AV426 – Hotham Valley's 1919 vintage dining carriage, used regularly on the Etmilyn Forest Diner restaurant train.

Two appeals run during 2012 were to enable the complete purchase of steam locomotive W947 from Rail Heritage WA with a view to restoring it to operational condition. Although Hotham Valley already owns four W class engines, W947 will considerably strengthen the steam locomotive fleet and provides added interest with a unique pattern sand-dome which ultimately served as a prototype for those later employed on the WAGR V class. Work on W947's boiler continues as funds and resources become available, with one future option of marrying the boiler with W903's or W920's frame.

Another long-running appeal (dating back to 1977) is for the restoration of G71 'Menzies. G71 was built as a sister engine of Hotham Valley Railway's G123, part of a batch of 22 built by Dübs and Company of Scotland in 1897. Unlike G123, G71 spent most of its service years away from the WAGR operating instead with various privately owned timber companies. Whilst it will be some years (if not decades) before G71 will be operational, it is important to ensure equipment like this is kept for future generations of members as the funds and resources may become available.

== Motive power ==
=== Overview ===
As of 2018, Hotham Valley railway owns and operates some twenty-two locomotives (eight steam and sixteen diesel), of which a total of seven are currently operational.

=== Steam locomotives ===
This is a list of steam locomotives currently owned by Hotham Valley Railway. Some items in this list are privately owned; or on long term lend and/or lease arrangements.

The In service date refers to original date of entry into the original owners' service.

Number and name	Locomotive	In service	Builder	Notes	Operational	Photograph
W903 Marrinup	WAGR W class 4-8-2	1951	Beyer Peacock	Out of service pending overhaul	No	W903 at Waroona in the early 21st century
W908 Dwellingup	WAGR W class 4-8-2	1951	Beyer Peacock	Stored - used for heavy spares.	No	
W920 Pinjarra	WAGR W class 4-8-2	1951	Beyer Peacock	Currently undergoing overhaul; W920 is the "Flag-Ship" of the fleet, being the first steam locomotive to be operated by HVR. Last HVTR W to work on the public network – to Collie 10 September 2005	No	W920 at Mundijong when Hotham Valley was still conducting mainline tours
W945 Banksiadale	WAGR W class 4-8-2	1952	Beyer Peacock	In service, after 8-year overhaul.	Yes	W945 at Pinjarra
W947	WAGR W class 4-8-2	1952	Beyer Peacock	Acquired as surplus from Rail Heritage WA in 2011; delivered November 2013, under long term overhaul	No	
G71 Menzies	Millars ex-WAGR G class 4-6-0	1897	Dübs & Co	Previously G111 – sold into private use in 1897, working first as a railway line construction locomotive in the Eastern Goldfields and then as a timber lines locomotive with Millars from 1898. Currently unassembled; subject of the 'G71 Menzies appeal'.	No	
G123	WAGR G class 4-6-0	1897	Dübs & Co	One time 'Koombana Queen'. Stored, inoperable pending long term overhaul.	No	G123 when in service at Dwellingup

=== Diesel locomotives ===
This is a list of diesel locomotives owned Hotham Valley Railway. Some items in this list are privately owned; or on long term lend and/or lease arrangements.

Number and name	Locomotive	In service	Notes	Operational	Photograph
C1701	WAGR C class Co-Co	1962	Stored, used for spares. On display at Pinjarra	No	C1701 at Wonnerup in January 1987
C1702	WAGR C class Co-Co	1962	Stored in Dwellingup.	No	C1702 at Dwellingup in July 2011
C1703	WAGR C class Co-Co	1962	Operational, at Dwellingup	Yes	
XA1401 Pedong	WAGR XA class 2-Do-2	1955	Operational; used on the steam and diesel ranger services	Yes	XA1401 at Pinjarra on a mainline tour
XA1411 Weedookarri	WAGR XA class 2-Do-2	1956	Stored on the west side of Pinjarra yards, used for heavy spares	No	
G50	MRWA G class Co-Co	1963	Operational. Used on Steamranger services	Yes	G50 at Pinjarra
F40	MRWA F class A1A-A1A	1958	Privately owned. Operational; used on trains.	Yes	
F44	MRWA F class A1A-A1A	1958	Source of spare parts for F40.	No	
SEC1	SECWA example of TGR V class 0-6-0DM	1950	Operational; used on the Etmilyn Diner, Forest Train and High Tea services.	Yes	
V4	TGR V class 0-6-0DM	1948	Out of service pending repairs	No	
V5	TGR V class 0-6-0DM	1948	In limited service, awaiting repairs	Yes	
Z1152	WAGR Z class 0-6-0DM	1953	In service – sees occasional use on work trains, shunting duties within Dwellingup yard, and is usually on display during the annual September Festival.	Yes	
ST2	WAGR ST type 1A	1968	Stored out of service	No	ST2 at Isandra
MA 1862	WAGR MA class B-B	1973	Currently out of service at Pinjarra, undergoing repaint and final fitout before return to service in Dwellingup late 2026 or early 2027	No	

=== Visiting and past locomotives ===
In the past, some locomotives from other organisations have seen operation on Hotham Valley Railway services. Other locomotives have passed into different ownership after having first been owned/operated by Hotham Valley. Details of at least some of these locomotives are given in the following table:

Number and name	Locomotive	In service	Builder	With HVR	Notes	Current	Photograph
S549 Greenmount	WAGR S class 4-8-2	1947	Midland (WAGR)	1997–1999	Owned by the Rail Heritage WA, leased and operated by Hotham Valley services during the late 1990s. Currently under overhaul for possible future operational lease for seasonal use at the Shire of Dowerin.	No	S549 on a Hotham Valley service at Harvey
V1213	WAGR V class 2-8-2	1955	Robert Stephenson and Hawthorns		Initially purchased by Hotham Valley in 1980, V1213 was on-sold and restored to operation by Ian Willis. V1213 featured on many mainline tours, especially the Collie and Northam trips. V1213 is now privately owned and stored out of service in Pinjarra.	No	V1213 on a mainline tour with Hotham Valley Railway in the early 1990s

== Rolling stock ==
=== Passenger stock ===
The HVR's passenger rolling stock fleet was drawn from a number of sources: in addition to original WAGR carriages, Hotham Valley Railway also operates carriages converted from WAGR goods wagons and original passenger carriages from the Tasmanian Government Railways and South African Railways.

==== Riverland carriages ====
In 1988, Hotham Valley Railway acquired 25 second hand large Corten steel carriages from the South African Railways. Hotham Valley was expanding its mainline operations considerably and the Westrail owned carriages then in use on Hotham Valley's rail tours were no longer appropriate due to their age and other limitations.

The new fleet were converted into various types (including first and second class cars with and without guards compartments, buffet and dining cars) from SAR sleeping cars and all had been originally constructed during the 1960s and 70s. All of the cars were converted and refurbished prior to their shipment to Western Australia.

In Hotham Valley service, the cars were painted in green and cream livery with mustard roofs, reminiscent of the original WAGR colour scheme applied between the late 1950s and the mid-1970s. The cars all received names of Western Australian rivers (with the exception of AHF311 which was named Bloemfontein for the city where the cars were converted) and were given class designations and numbers in keeping with Westrail practise. The classes, names and numbers are listed in the table below.

Class	Number in class	Type	Seats	Numbers	Names
AHA	3	First Class with Guards Compartment	56	301, 302, 303	Ashburton, Murray, Fitzroy
AHB	3	First Class Buffet	28	304, 305, 306	Greenough, Gascoyne, Fortescue
AHD	1	Dining	-	307	Serpentine
AHE	3	Tourist (economy) Class with Guards Compartment	64	308, 309, 310	Kalgan, Coongan, Chapman
AHF	6	First Class	56	311,312, 314 - 317	Bloemfontein, Avon, Brunswick, Denmark, Murchison, Lunenburg
AHG	1	Guard/Luggage van	-	318	Frankland
AHL	1	Lounge	-	319	Hotham
AHT	7	Tourist (economy) Class	64	320 - 326	Harvey, Irwin, Preston, Blackwood, Mortlock, Canning, Dale

Until the introduction of 48 X-class diesel locomotives in 1954, the naming of WAGR vehicles was rare. Only two classes of WAGR steam locomotive were given names: the Pr class of 1938 was named after Western Australian rivers while the S class of 1943 was named after Western Australian hills. The Hotham Valley Riverland cars were also named for Western Australian rivers and thus shared many names with the Pr class engines, all of which had been withdrawn by 1971.

== General references ==
- Purcell, John (1991). Hotham Valley Tourist Railway: Souvenir Book. Perth, WA: Hotham Valley Tourist Railway WA. ISBN 0-646-06020-1.
- Sallis, Roger W (2009). The Pinjarra–Narrogin Railway: A History of Western Australia's Hotham Valley Line. Salisbury, SA: Roger W. Sallis. ISBN 9780646510224.
- Watson, Lindsay; Purcell, J.C. (1981). Hotham Valley Tourist Railway: Guide Book. Pinjarra, WA: Hotham Valley Tourist Railway WA. OCLC 757674698.
