= Walkaway Wind Farm =

Wind power station in Western Australia

Alinta 'Walkaway' Wind Farm
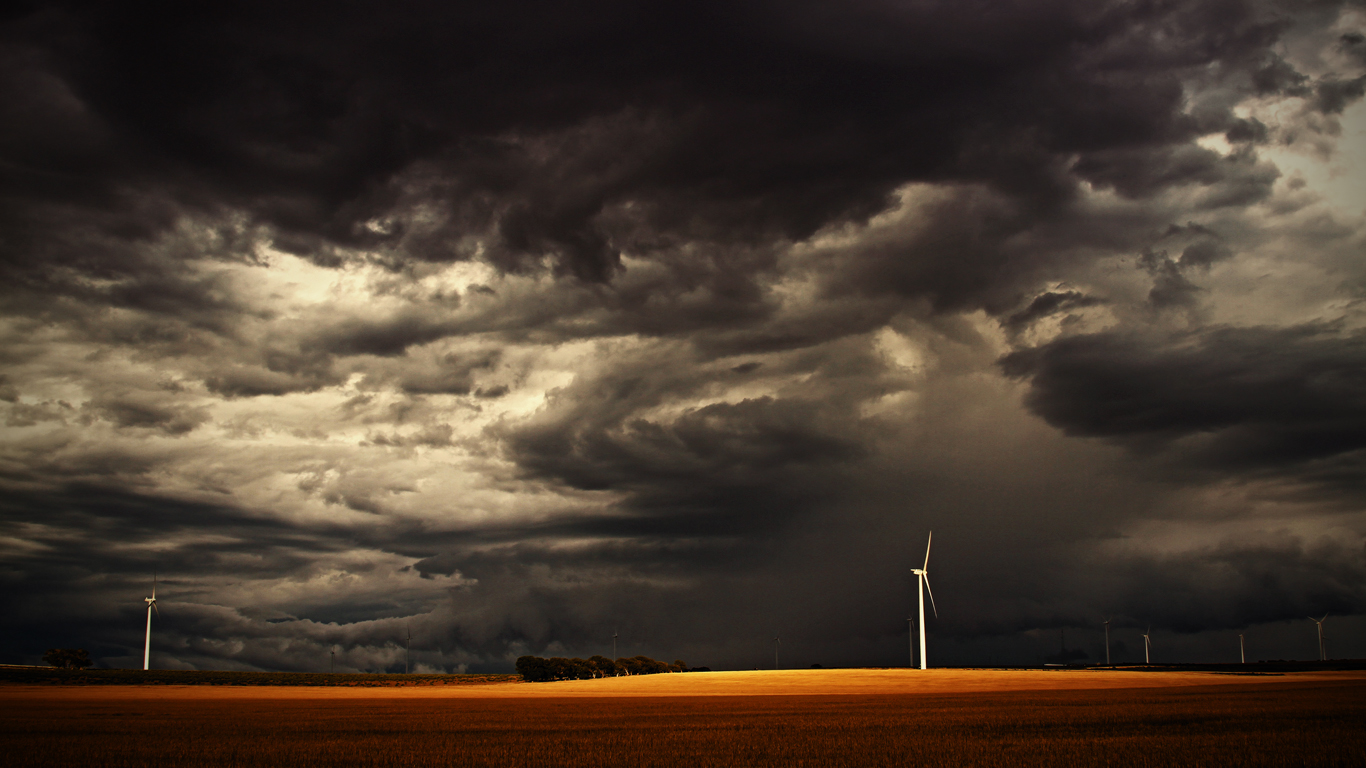
- Official name: Alinta Wind Farm
- Country: Australia
- Location: Walkaway, Western Australia
- Coordinates: 28°53′53″S 114°52′7″E
- Status: Operational
- Construction began: Late 2004
- Commission date: January 2006
- Owner: Infigen Energy
- Operator: Infigen Energy

Thermal power station
- Primary fuel: Wind energy

Wind farm
- Type: Onshore
- Hub height: 80 metres
- Rotor diameter: 82 metres

Power generation
- Units operational: 54
- Make and model: Vestas NM82
- Nameplate capacity: 89.1 MW

External links
- Website: www.infigenenergy.com

Alinta wind farm (also known as Walkaway wind farm) is a wind power station at Walkaway, just south of Geraldton, Western Australia. It is owned by Infigen Energy and has offtake agreements with Alinta Energy and AGL Energy.

The Alinta wind farm has an installed capacity of 89.1 megawatts. It supplies Perth and the south west in the South West Interconnected System (SWIS).

Each year the wind farm generates energy that would normally produce 360,150 tonnes of greenhouse gases if generated by fossil fuel–based methods. This is the equivalent of removing 76,000 cars from the roads.

Electricity produced by the wind farm is purchased mainly by Alinta Energy.

In June 2022, one of the turbines collapsed, causing the wind farm to be temporarily shut down.

== See also ==
- Wind power in Australia
