= Walkaway, Western Australia =

Walkaway
- Town
- Coordinates: 28.939°S 114.802°E
- Country: Australia
- State: Western Australia
- LGA(s): City of Greater Geraldton
- Location: 398 km (247 mi) N of Perth; 37 km (23 mi) SE of Geraldton; 11 km (6.8 mi) E of Greenough

Government
  - State electorate(s): Geraldton
  - Federal division(s): Durack

Area
  - Total: 113.1 km^{2} (43.7 sq mi)

Population
  - Total(s): 222 (SAL 2021)
- Postcode: 6528

Walkaway is a small town in the City of Greater Geraldton local government area of Western Australia. At the 2016 census, Walkaway had a population of 270.

Its name is a corruption of Wagga wah, referring to the bend in the nearby Greenough River, and was originally given to the railway station when a line was built from Geraldton in 1887.

== Rail ==
In 1894, Walkaway was linked with the Eastern Railway at Midland Junction, 15 kilometres (9.3 mi) east of Perth, by a private land grant railway constructed by the Midland Railway Company. With the railway and an expanding agricultural area, the township grew. Decline set in with labour shortages associated with the First World War and the construction in 1915 of the parallel state government-owned Northern Railway, 50 kilometres (31 mi) to the east of the Midland Line.

== Renewable energy ==
A number of renewable energy generation projects are located near Walkaway. In 2014, projects produced 162 MW of electrical power. Additional projects along with upgrades to current projects are scheduled for construction. The Mid West region is identified as a potential location for developing renewable energy technologies that include additional wind and solar photovoltaic electricity projects, solar thermal, geothermal, bioenergy, and ocean energy.

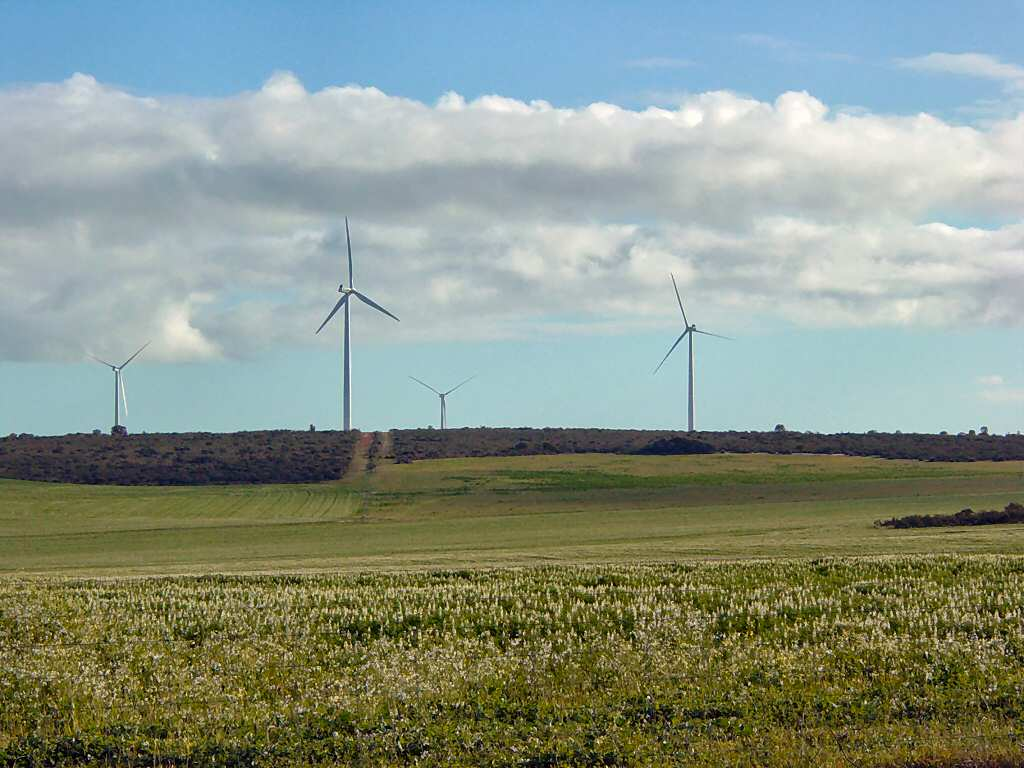
Wind turbines at the Walkaway Wind Farm

=== Walkaway Wind Farm ===
The Walkaway Wind Farm, 9 kilometres (5.6 mi) east of Walkaway, was completed in August 2005. It consists of 54 turbines, each producing 1.8 megawatts (2,400 hp), 80 metres (260 ft) high, and with 40-metre (130 ft)blade spans. Development consent has been given for an expansion of the project to up to 400 MW.

=== Mumbida Wind Farm ===
The Mumbida Wind Farm, 5 kilometres (3.1 mi) east of Walkaway, is a 55 MW renewable energy project developed by a joint venture of Verve Energy and Infrastructure Capital Group (ICG). Mumbida was completed in 2013 and is now fully operational. Mumbida Wind Farm utilises the 2.5 MW General Electric 2.5xl wind turbines, the first time that this model of wind turbine has been used in Australia. The Mumbida wind farm has been designed to be expanded to 85 MW in the future.

=== Greenough River Solar Farm ===
The Greenough River Solar Farm is the first stage of a 40 MW solar photo voltaic (PV) electricity generator. Stage 1 currently produces 10 MW and was commissioned in 2012. At the time of commissioning, it was the largest solar PV generator in Australia. Construction of Stage 2 is scheduled to begin in 2014 and will add an additional 30 MW to the project, located 30 kilometres (19 mi) east of Walkaway and 50 kilometres (31 mi) southeast of Geraldton, on the Walkaway-Nangetty Road.
