= Midland Junction railway station =

Former railway station in Perth, Western Australia

Coordinates: 31°53′36″S 116°00′22″E

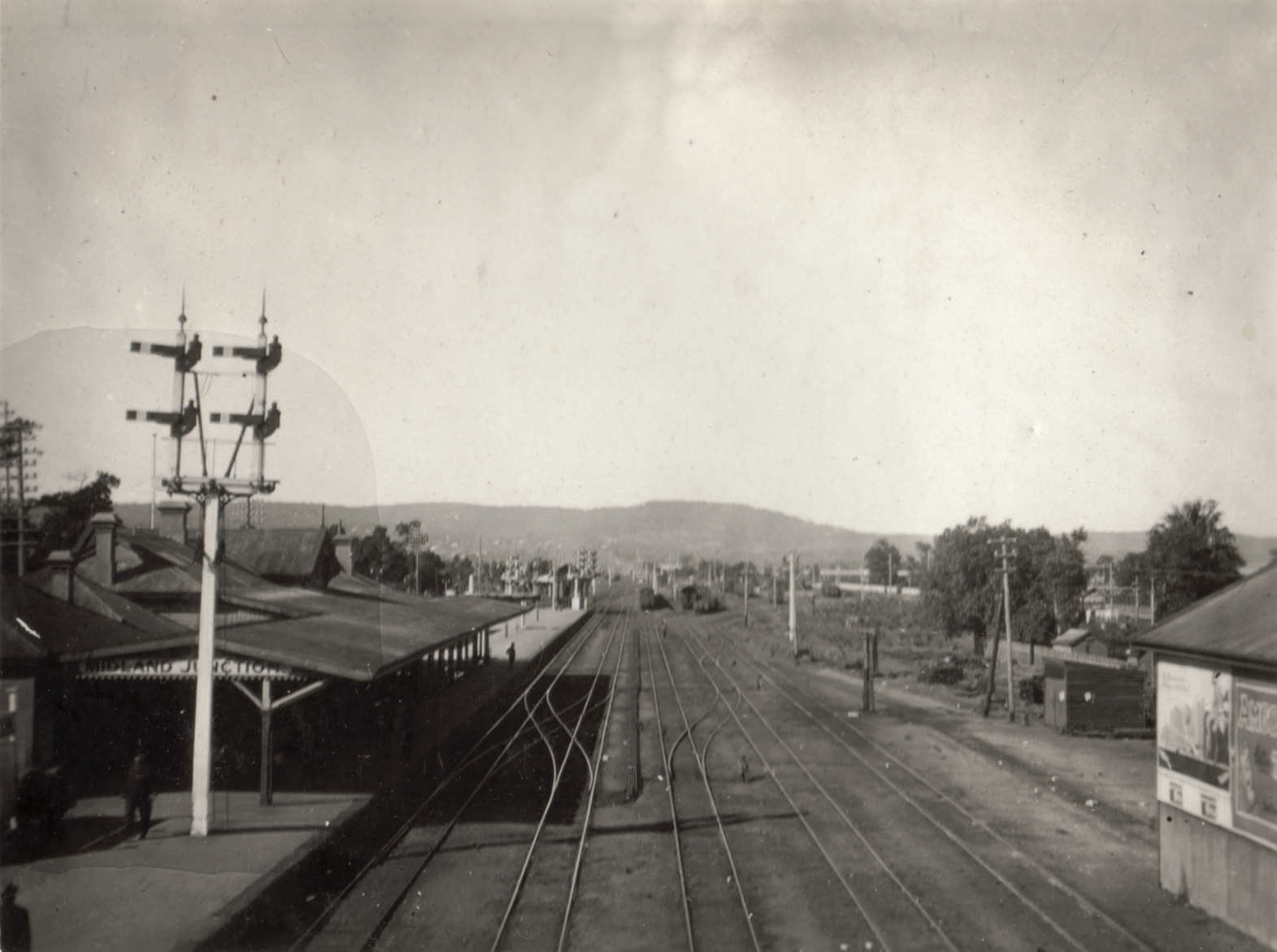
Midland Junction station, May 1927 – taken from the railway workshops footbridge – looking east towards Greenmount Hill

The Midland Junction railway station was an important junction station on the Eastern Railway of Western Australia until its closure in 1966.

Its history started on 1 March 1886 when Frederick Broome, then Governor of Western Australia, turned the first sod. It was the first railway station in Midland Junction and was replaced by the Midland station 300 metres (980 ft) west, across the tracks from the Midland Railway Workshops.

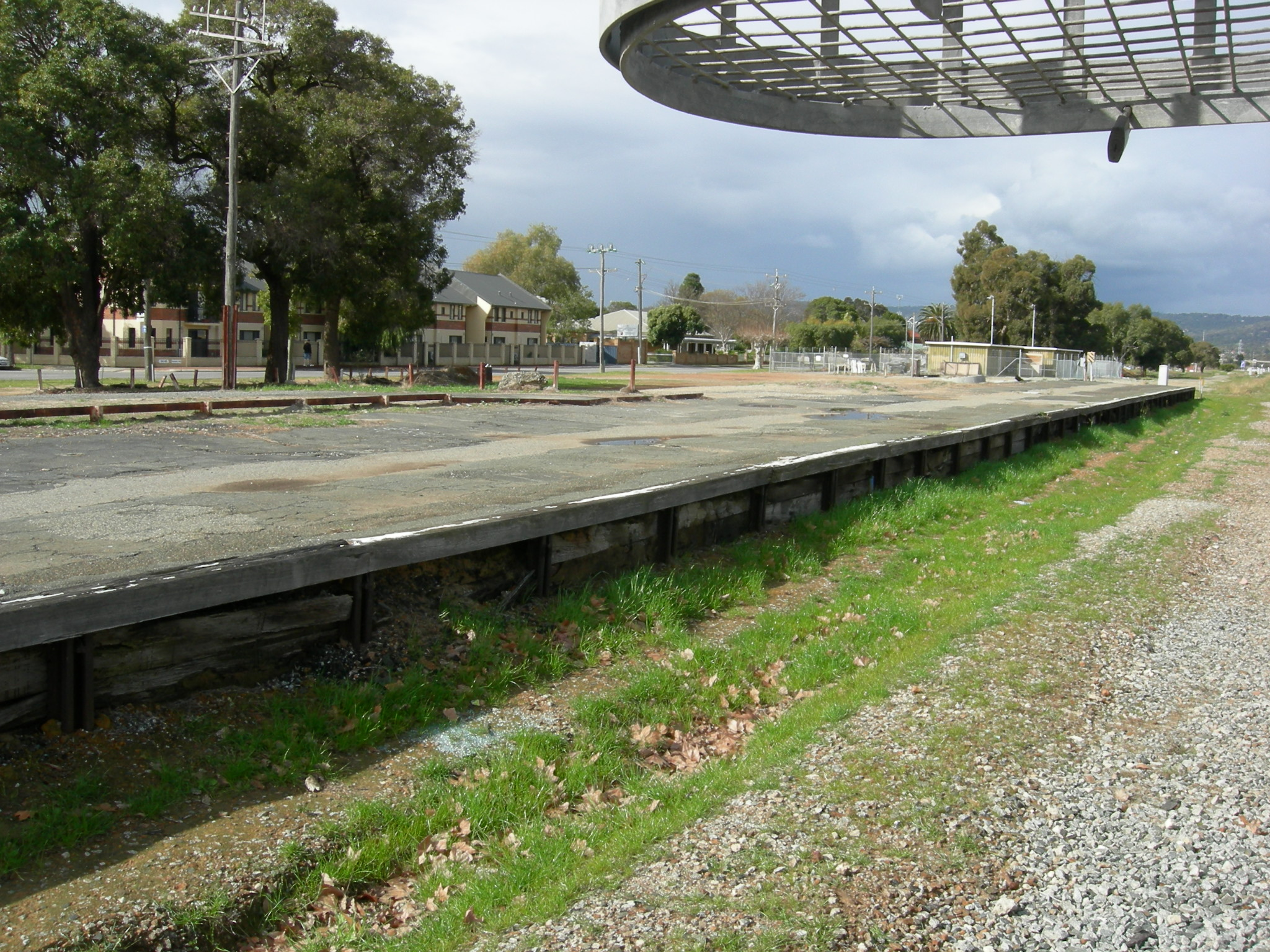
Original Midland Junction railway station platform looking north east from track side

== Junction era ==
Midland Junction was an aptly named locality and railway station, as it had the following services leaving from its platforms:

- the Upper Darling Range railway or Zig Zag railway to Kalamunda until 1949
- Mundaring (and Mundaring Weir until 1952) until 1954
- Bellevue until 1965
- Chidlow until 1965
- Midland Railway of Western Australia until 1963

It was in effect the point at which all rail services in the Western Australian network had to pass by – except for the South West line to Bunbury.

It was also a stopping point for Western Australian Government Railways Railway Bus Services until its closure.

The Midland Railway workshops and sheds were to the west on the area now developed with the Centrepoint Shopping Centre just south of the Midland Town Hall and original post office.

=== Eastern railway ===
In the 1890s following the construction of the Eastern Railway second route, Midland Junction had regular metropolitan passenger services running through on to Chidlow and Mundaring until 1954. Services ceased from the Mundaring loop or "first route" at that date, but the line was not closed by Parliament until 12 March 1965.

The second route continued until the closure of the Bellevue to Northam line, on 13 February 1966.

=== Station and yard ===
The conditions of the facilities at the station, and the station setup were at different times criticised as being poor and requiring attention.

=== Signal boxes ===
Due to the amount of traffic passing the railway station, the adjacent Midland railway workshops, marshalling yards and other services, there were two signal boxes either end of the railway station.

== Following closure ==
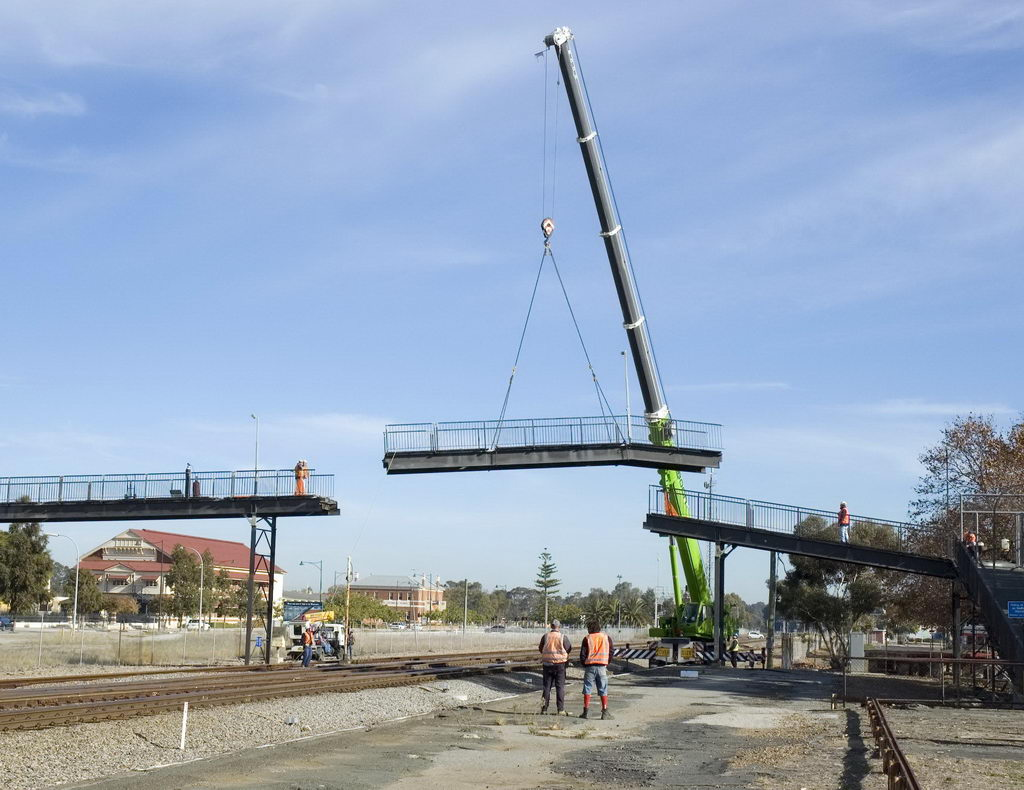
Removal of the old pedestrian footbridge in mid-2006

The railway station buildings were removed, as well as surrounding fixtures, except the footbridge over the railway line to the Midland Railway Workshops.

In the 2000s the adjacent footbridge to the Midland Railway Workshops south of the site was removed when the Helena Street railway crossing was re-opened.

The old platform has been utilised by photographers and railfans to watch mainline traffic pass.

== New railway station ==
In 2020 a commitment from the government was to replace the 50 year old station to the west, with the development of a new Midland station partway between the then-current Midland station and the location of the original Midland Junction station. In 2024, the new Midland railway station was under construction. The old platform was demolished in 2024 to make way for the new level crossing at Cale Street.

== See also ==
- Midland line, Perth
