= Locomotives of the Western Australian Government Railways =

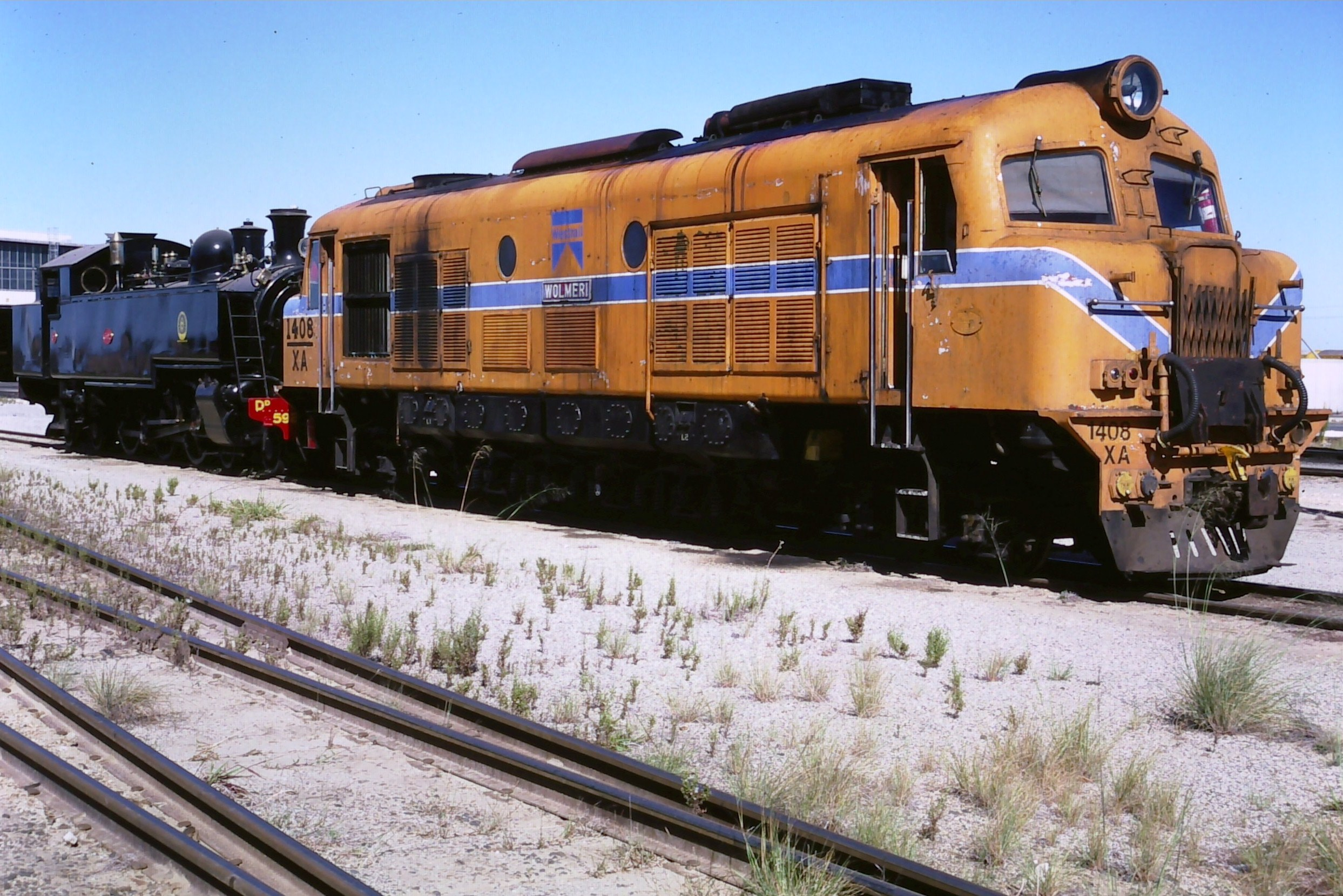
(L–R) narrow gauge locomotives DD592 and XA1408 WOLMERI, both stabled at Forrestfield Marshalling Yard, 1986. The track in the foreground is standard gauge track.

The Western Australian Government Railways (usually abbreviated to WAGR) operated many unique steam, diesel and electric locomotive classes. Often suffering from lack of available funds the WAGR locomotive fleet often consisted of locomotives far older than their expected operational life. Only one electric locomotive was operated by the government during the WAGR years.

== Early steam locomotives ==
The first WAGR locomotives were two 1875 2-6-0 tender engines, later classified as the M class, built in England in 1875 and shipped to WA by sea. They operated on the first government railway in Geraldton, some 450 kilometres (280 mi) north of Perth. The opening of the Fremantle to Guildford railway in 1881 saw the use of two 0-6-0T tank engines from the British Robert Stephenson & Company, numbered Numbers 1 and 2 and later classified as the C Class in 1885. The C class engines were later given small tenders to increase fuel storage. C1 was later renamed 'Katie' and is currently preserved at the Rail Transport Museum.

The contractor responsible for the construction of the Fremantle-Guildford railway, John Robb, sold his locomotive to the WA government also in 1881, and it became Number 3. Number 3 became to prototype of the WAGR A class 2-6-0 tender locomotives. The A class locomotives were soon supplemented by the B class 4-6-0T tank engines which had twice the haulage capacity of the A class. During this time the WAGR had been greatly expanded over the Darling Scarp and into the large agricultural strip to the East, specifically to the centres of Chidlow, Northam and Toodyay (then Newcastle). With the beginning of WA gold rushes in 1888 the railways required massive expansion and in 1889 the WAGR received a larger version of the A class which had been used in the construction of the private Great Southern Railway to Albany station, on the southern coast of Western Australia. The new locomotives were a vast improvement over previous types and became the WAGR G Class, of which a total of 72 were eventually ordered, becoming the railways' most numerous type for its entire history. The G class existed in two forms - the initial 2-6-0 configuration and a later 4-6-0 type with improved running stability. The G class was immensely successful on a wide range of duties, and although phased out of mainline workings in the early 20th century, it lingered until the very end of steam in WA, with two examples still working as shunters at Bunbury in August 1972.

== Late 19th century ==
The steep 1 in 30 gradients over the Darling Scarp presented a major problem to the early railway system, so in 1893/94 the K class 2-8-4T tank engines were introduced for traffic on this Eastern Railway. The K class was the first class of locomotives designed new for the WAGR, and some were later ordered for use in South Africa. The K class was unfortunately too heavy for branch-line operations and was so restricted to main-line services. In 1896 two new classes were introduced to the WAGR, namely the N Class 4-4-4T suburban tank engines and the O Class 2-8-0T&T, so classified for the presence of tenders and boiler-side fuel-storage bunkers. The N and O classes shared a standard boiler and cylinders which gave them compatibility. The N class was primarily used on suburban passenger and shunting duties - a role which it dominated for almost two decades. The O class was used initially on mainline goods services but was quickly relegated to branch line services where it served successfully. In the event further orders were placed until the class totaled fifty-six, with 10 being built locally at the Midland Railway Workshops.

The R class 4-4-0s represented a radical departure from previous WAGR locomotive design. The engines featured the largest diameter wheels of any WAGR locomotive at 1.45m, which allows for higher speeds at reduced power. Given the nature of WA's railways, however, this was not beneficial and the class saw limited service in its intended role as express engines, but continued to serve in country areas (such as around Northam) for many years. The class numbered 24 and was withdrawn in the mid-1920s when replaced by much larger locomotives.

== Early 20th century ==
The onset of the 20th century saw the introduction of many new locomotives to the W.A.G.R. Notable examples included the E and F class engines of 1902 which were near identical with the exception of their wheel arrangements. An additional variant of the E class was provided as the Ec class, built in the United States. The E class was used for passenger services and was accordingly given the larger diameter driving wheels in a 4-6-0 configuration, while the F class freight locomotives had a 4-8-0 arrangement, providing extra power at the expense of speed. The D class 4-6-4T suburban tank engines were likewise introduced in 1902 and replaced the N class engines in suburban operations. All three classes, with the exception of some individual locomotives, underwent the process of superheating in 1912 to become the Es, Fs and Ds classes respectively. Also in 1912 the M class garratt-type locomotives were introduced, representing the first use of this type of locomotive in full-size mainline operation. The class was well adapted to WAGR's light branchlines and tight-radius curves thanks to its articulation.

== The Interwar Period ==
Suffering from the effects of both the First World War and the Great Depression, the WAGR introduced relatively few locomotive classes in the years between World War One and World War Two. The P class 4-6-2 pacific-type locomotives were introduced in 1924 and in 1938 an improved version, the Pr Class was constructed at the Midland workshops. 8 P class engines were converted to Pr class between 1941 and 1944 to alleviate war time stresses on the aged WAGR locomotive fleet, most of which dated back to the 19th century. In 1936, the company owned 420 locomotives and 4 railcars.

== Post World War II ==
In the years following World War II, the WAGR underwent a massive expansion and quickly introduced new services and many new locomotive classes.

== Dieselisation ==
Mainline diesel locomotives arrived on the WAGR in 1953 with the introduction of the WAGR Y class and in 1954 with the X Class while diesel shunting locomotives had arrived in 1953 with the Z Class.

== See also ==
- List of Western Australian locomotive classes

== Sources ==
- Higham, Geoffrey (2007). Marble Bar to Mandurah: A History of Passenger Rail Services in Western Australia (1st ed.). Bassendean: Rail Heritage WA. ISBN 978-0-9803922-0-3. OCLC 271545712. Wikidata Q140375689.

== Further information ==
- Rail Heritage WA – official site of Rail Heritage WA - the museum and archive in Bassendean along with Battye Library and State Records Office of Western Australia the three main locations of information about WAGR locomotives
