= Watheroo, Western Australia =

Watheroo
- Town
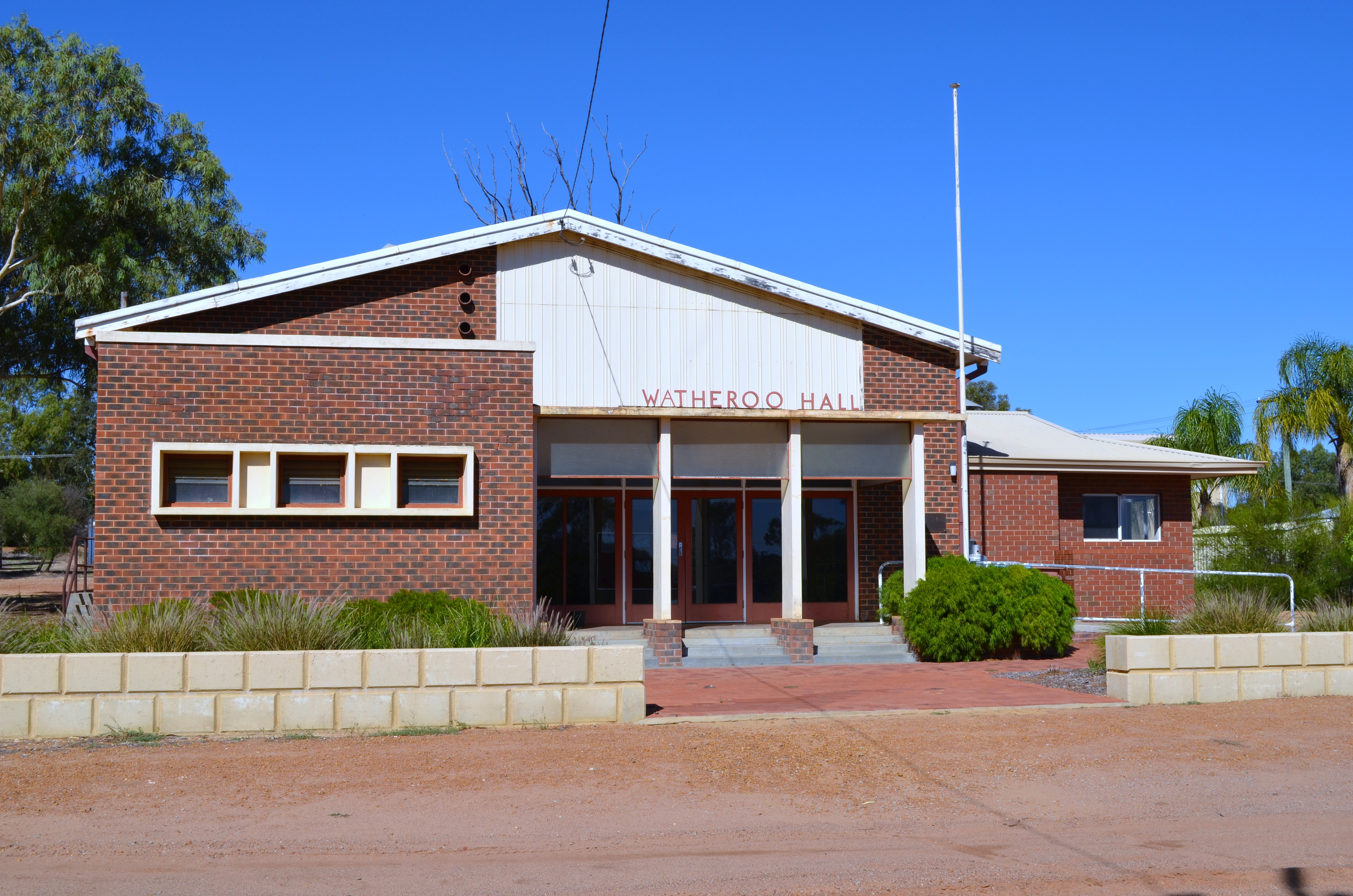
- Watheroo Hall, 2013

- Interactive map of Watheroo
- Coordinates: 30°17′52.4702″S 116°03′31.4046″E
- Country: Australia
- State: Western Australia
- LGA: Shire of Moora
- Location: 214 km (133 mi) north of Perth; 38 km (24 mi) north of Moora; 98 km (61 mi) east of Jurien Bay
- Established: 1907

Government
  - State electorate: Moore
  - Federal division: Durack

Area
  - Total: 783.4 km^{2} (302.5 sq mi)
- Elevation: 263 m (863 ft)

Population
  - Total: 137 (SAL 2021)
- Postcode: 6513

Watheroo is a small town in the Wheatbelt region of Western Australia. There are 137 residents, according to the 2021 census.

== History ==
Land in the area was settled by James Oliver in 1851, the area was surveyed in 1871 and the name Watheroo was charted for the first time. Watheroo is a thriving farming Wheatbelt town, farming livestock and grain. The town was an original station on the Midland Railway Company railway line to Walkaway. The townsite was gazetted in 1907.

=== Railway ===
Following flooding along the Moore River in 1907, the railway lines between Watheroo and Moora were closed for some time when parts of the track were washed away. Rail services were again affected in 1917 when 1.7 inches (43 mm) of rain fell in three hours causing more flooding, washways and the railyard in town to be submerged.

== Etymology ==
The name is Indigenous Australian in origin and was the name of a nearby spring. The word Watheroo is derived from the word wardo which means little bird or more specifically the willy wagtail or from the word wardoro which means water.

== Climate ==
Climate data for Watheroo (1918–1959)
Month	Jan	Feb	Mar	Apr	May	Jun	Jul	Aug	Sep	Oct	Nov	Dec	Year
Mean daily maximum °C (°F)	33.9 (93.0)	33.8 (92.8)	31.0 (87.8)	26.5 (79.7)	21.3 (70.3)	18.1 (64.6)	17.2 (63.0)	18.3 (64.9)	21.1 (70.0)	23.7 (74.7)	28.1 (82.6)	31.5 (88.7)	25.4 (77.7)
Mean daily minimum °C (°F)	15.9 (60.6)	16.3 (61.3)	14.8 (58.6)	11.4 (52.5)	8.0 (46.4)	6.2 (43.2)	5.0 (41.0)	5.4 (41.7)	6.5 (43.7)	8.0 (46.4)	11.2 (52.2)	13.8 (56.8)	10.2 (50.4)
Average precipitation mm (inches)	9.4 (0.37)	16.9 (0.67)	22.1 (0.87)	23.4 (0.92)	58.8 (2.31)	84.6 (3.33)	78.4 (3.09)	54.6 (2.15)	30.1 (1.19)	20.8 (0.82)	9.4 (0.37)	9.3 (0.37)	417.2 (16.43)
