= Rail Heritage WA =

Railway heritage organisation in Western Australia

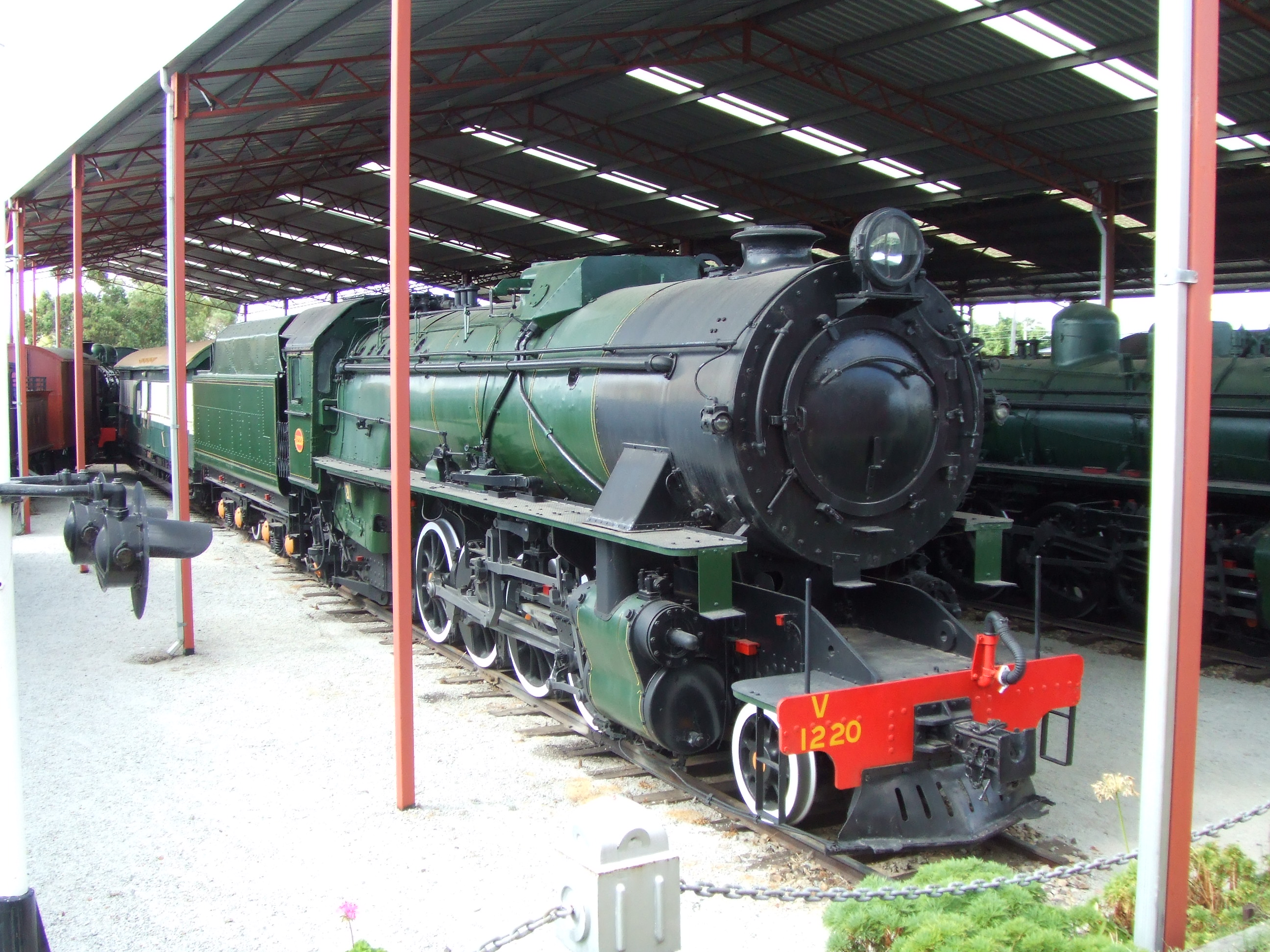
V1220 at the Western Australian Rail Transport Museum in April 2006

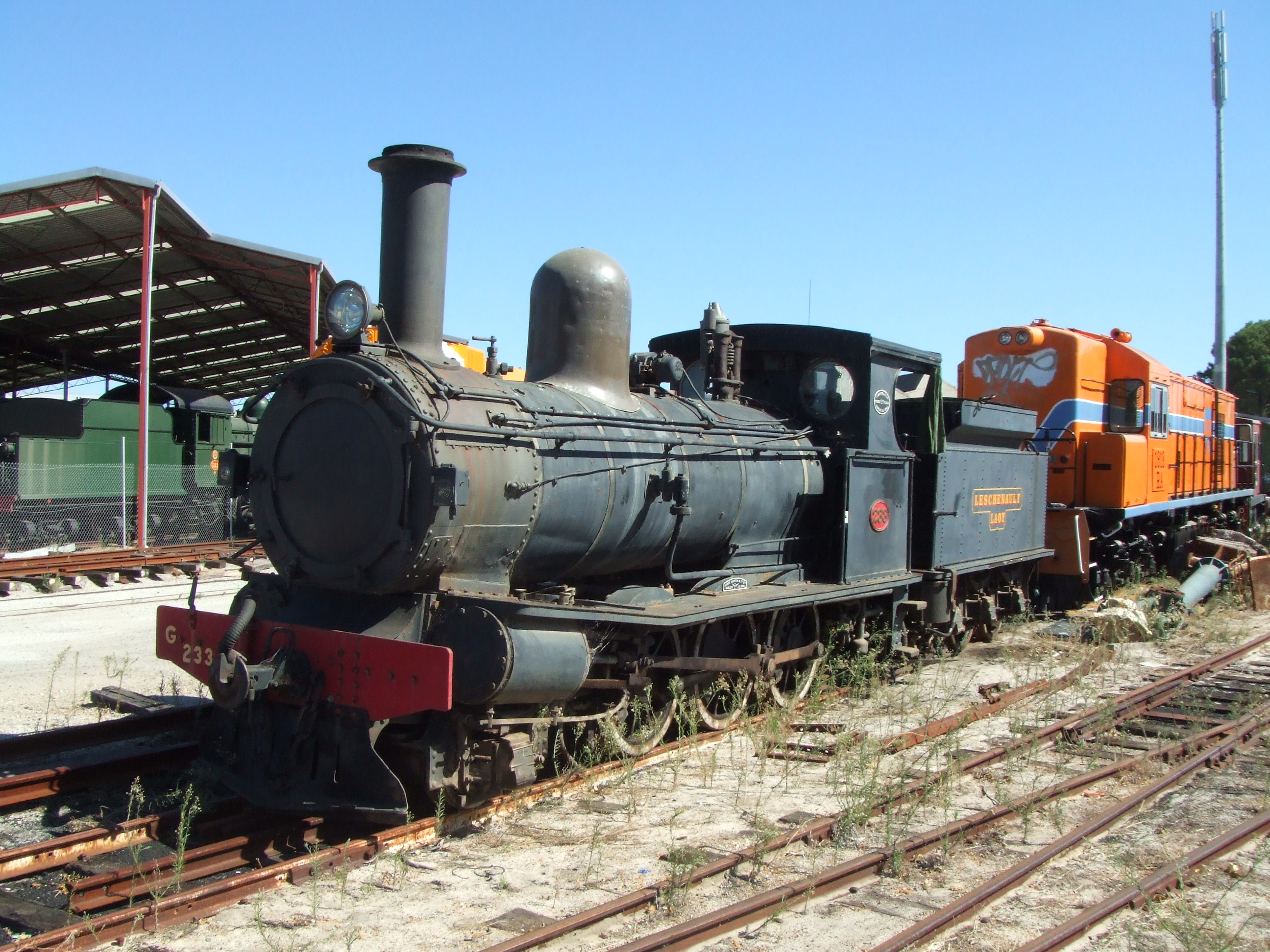
G233 at the Western Australian Rail Transport Museum in April 2006

Rail Heritage WA is the local trading name of the Australian Railway Historical Society (Western Australian Division) Inc.

== History ==
The Western Australian branch of the Australian Railway Historical Society was formed in February 1959. In the 1960s, the Western Australian Government Railways placed its collection of historical items on loan, later donating the collection in 1992. In November 1974, a museum was opened on land donated by CSBP & Farmers. While its collection is primarily rolling stock that operated in Western Australia, it does have examples from other systems.

It is the owner and manager of the Bassendean based Western Australian Rail Transport Museum. It conducts annual RailFest events (some times designated "Steamfest" if locomotives are active) at the Bassendean museum.

In the past the society conducted extensive rail tours - especially in the late 1960s in the final years of steam operation in Western Australia.

It regularly produces materials that celebrate centenaries and other anniversaries for parts of the Western Australian railway network.

It also has contracted consultants for submissions on railway heritage issues in Perth and Western Australia.

== Publications ==
It publishes books and pamphlets relative to Western Australian railway history. Recent publication by the organisation include:

- Higham, Geoffrey (2007). Marble Bar to Mandurah: A History of Passenger Rail Services in Western Australia (1st ed.). Bassendean: Rail Heritage WA. ISBN 978-0-9803922-0-3. OCLC 271545712. Wikidata Q140375689.
- Gunzburg, Adrian (2008) Rails in the Bush
- Gray, Bill (2010) Guide to the collection : The Railway Museum, Western Australia ISBN 9780980392234

It has also published a regular magazine The Westland (sometimes The Westland Express and The Westlander.
