= S class =

S class may refer to:

== Automobiles ==
- Mercedes-Benz S-Class, an automobile
- S-segment, a European vehicle size class

== Rail transport ==
- NBR S class, British steam locomotives
- Victorian Railways S class, Australian steam locomotives
- Victorian Railways S class (diesel), Australian diesel locomotives
- South Australian Railways S class, steam locomotives
- WAGR S class, Australian steam locomotives
- WAGR S class (1888), Australian steam locomotives
- Westrail S class, Australian diesel locomotives
- S-class Melbourne tram

== Ships ==
- S-class destroyer (disambiguation), multiple types of ships
- S-class submarine (disambiguation), multiple types of submarines
- S-class ferry, operated by BC Ferries in British Columbia, Canada
- S-class torpedo boat, ex-Russian torpedo boats operated by Finland
- Statendam-class cruise ship, a class of the Holland America Line

== Other uses ==
- "S-Class" (song), a 2023 song by Stray Kids

== See also ==
- Class S (disambiguation)
- S-Type (disambiguation)
- Type S (disambiguation)
