= W class =

W class may refer to:

- W-class Melbourne tram, a family of electric trams
- W-class destroyer (disambiguation), several classes of ships
- Silverton Tramway W class, 4-8-2 steam locomotives
- South Australian Railways W class, 2-6-0 steam locomotives
- Victorian Railways W class, diesel-hydraulic shunting locomotives
- WAGR W class, Western Australian steam locomotives
- A code used by some airlines for premium economy

== See also ==
- Class W
