= Western Australian Government Railways S class =

Western Australian Government Railway S class may refer to one of the following locomotives:

- WAGR S class (1888)
- WAGR S class
