= Steam pipe =

Steam pipe may refer to:

- A pipe designed to carry pressurized steam from a boiler to the working components, i.e. the steam engine(s) or turbine(s). Such piping usually includes valves to control the routing of the steam, or to stop the flow altogether.
- A specific application of a steam pipe is the main steam pipe of a steam locomotive, which transports the pressurized steam from the steam dome atop the boiler to the cylinders, via the steam chests.
- A component of a district heating system, which distributes heat through an area via heated steam, which is transported through (typically buried) steam pipes to individual buildings.
  - New York City steam system, a district heating system in New York City, an example of a district heating system.
