= Frederick Mills (engineer) =

- Born: 1898
- Died: 22 June 1949 (aged 51); Perth, Western Australia
- Title: Chief Mechanical Engineer

Frederick Mills (1898 – 22 June 1949) was Chief Mechanical Engineer of the Western Australian Government Railways from 1940 until his death in 1949. He was seconded to the federal government during World War II and was known throughout his career for designing a number of the influential steam locomotives for operation in Western Australia, including a number of controversial designs. No fewer than four Royal Commissions were held into various aspects of WAGR operations – including an examination of the safety of the Australian Standard Garratt locomotive and other aspects pertinent to its design and development – during his tenure, all of them into issues against which Mills himself fought unceasingly.

== Biography ==
Frederick Mills was born in England in 1898. He served for six years as an apprentice fitter-and-turner with R&W Hawthorn Leslie & Co at Newcastle upon Tyne and after passing the necessary examination was admitted to that company's drawing office during his apprenticeship. He served in the Royal Air Force and on de-mobilisation became a draughtsman with Sir WG Armstrong-Whitworth & Co, another well-known builder. While working for his two British employers, Mills participated in the design of locomotives for export to railways throughout the world. In 1926, on the recommendation of Sir WG Armstrong-Whitworth & Co, he was appointed Designing Draughtsman for the Western Australian Government Railways (WAGR) and emigrated to Western Australia. He was promoted to Chief Draughtsman in 1931.

During 1928 Mills was handed the responsibility for designing the first Garratt type of locomotive built in Australia. The design was similar to the M class supplied by Beyer, Peacock & Co, but the lengthening of the firebox required work to be done on the re-distribution of weight and the pivots.

During the 1930s, Mills submitted plans for a new 4-8-2 locomotive class to assist in Western Australia's failing railway system. They would become the WAGR S Class, the only locomotive to be completely conceived, designed and built at the Midland Railway Workshops. Despite his insistence that their construction constituted essential war work, production of the S Class was postponed, and it wasn't until 1943 that the first three of an eventual total of ten were placed into service. The S class was to prove one of the more controversial of Western Australia's locomotives; suffering from a variety of early problems due to Mills' implementation of some bold new ideas. However, despite numerous complaints from various railway unions they eventually became solid performers.

Mills was just as well-educated in engineering theory as railway locomotive design practice. In 1939 he relieved the Associate Professor of Mechanical Engineering at the University of Western Australia. He was a Member of the Institution of Engineers Australia, the North East Coast Institution of Engineers & Shipbuilders, the American Society of Mechanical Engineers and the Institution of Locomotive Engineers. As a graduate of the second of those worthy bodies, Mills won special prizes for his papers on locomotive boilers and steam locomotive design and construction. He published in the engineering press several articles on locomotive and rollingstock design and read papers before the Institution of Engineers.

Also in 1939, the James F Lincoln Arc Welding Foundation of the United States conducted a worldwide competition for papers on new applications of electric welding. Mills won the £1,000 first prize in the Railway Locomotive section for his design of a welded engine frame. In 1940 he was appointed Chief Mechanical Engineer.

During World War II the WAGR, like other Australian railway systems, was facing severe economic crisis. The problems in Western Australia, however, were exaggerated by a succession of State Governments having provided little for the railways, meaning that they had not yet recovered from the effects of the Great Depression. Approximately half of the WAGR's locomotive fleet dated back before the turn of the century, and by 1943 a quarter were out of service pending overhaul.

== Wartime service with the Commonwealth Land Transport Board ==
In 1942, Mills was seconded to the Federal Government to lead a team tasked with providing a design for a new standard-class narrow-gauge locomotive; the result being the Australian Standard Garratt of which 25 were used by the WAGR from a total of 57 locomotives built. The class were all withdrawn within fifteen years.

The War in the Pacific had turned Australia into a military base, with no state more affected than Queensland due to its strategic location vis á vis the Pacific theatre. The Australian and American military machines required of the Queensland Railways (QR) a logistical task that they were hard-pressed to accommodate; in fact a worse situation could scarcely be imagined. When the military forces needed machinery, people, and supplies moved in vast quantities as a matter of priority they had at their disposal the modest infrastructure of QR; light-weight track and structures, a tortuous geographic profile, unpretentious locomotives with low axle-loads, and train lengths limited by these factors. Added to that was the proportion of current QR motive-power that was rotating through overhaul and repair. Against this background, the requirement for extra, effective motive-power in Queensland (and to a slightly lesser-extent, the rest of the nation) was identified as a critical requirement.

Mills was an eminent locomotive engineer and had considerable experience in locomotive design but he lacked one quality that was to increase the friction that was later to develop between his new employer (the Commonwealth Ministry of Munitions) and QR in the design and introduction of the ASG. Mills was not overly-tolerant or possessed of an excess of humility; in fact he was arrogant, authoritarian and obstinate. Given the hostility that later developed between QR and those in wartime control of the nation’s railways over the design and introduction of the ASG, the personalities of Mills and Victorian Railways' Commissioner Harold Clapp were to have significance in some absurd circumstances that were to follow.

George Lawson, Federal Minister for Transport in 1942, was responsible for the administration of the National Security Act (1942) and Regulations. These gave the Commonwealth full power and authority to control rail and road transport and do all things necessary to give effect to the regulations. This included provision for setting up the Commonwealth Land Transport Board (CLTB) which was charged with giving effect to the regulations and directing what rail and road transport services should be maintained and the terms and conditions of operation. The CLTB was also responsible for the acquisition, by purchase or manufacture, of any required vehicles and accessories and to operate and use them and determine routes and priorities of transport.

The eminence of Victorian Railway's Commissioner Harold Winthrop Clapp as a railway manager resulted in his appointment by Lawson as the Director-General of the CLTB. In this position Clapp was empowered to authorise and direct all CLTB activity.

In April 1942, Joseph Ellis Commissioner of Railways for Western Australia since 1934 and being now — as Director of Locomotive and Rollingstock Construction in the Commonwealth Ministry of Munitions — a member of the CLTB, was requested by the War Railway Committee to examine Australia’s 3' 6"-gauge railway systems (but most specifically that of Queensland) as to the practicability of using Garratt-type locomotives, and advise the CLTB. The War Railway Committee was composed of the Director-General of Land Transport, the Commissioners of the State and Commonwealth railway systems, the Director of Rail Transport, a nominee of the Minister for Army, and two rail union representatives.

Ellis was an appropriate appointee. He had been an engineer for the Queensland Railways from 1910 to 1926, and the WAGR had used Garratt locomotives for some 30 years (the M class, originally ordered in 1911, being the first main-line Garratts ever built). His secret report — to a singular Term of Reference — would be used to justify the acquisition of what would become known as the Australian Standard Garratt, to alleviate a wartime motive-power deficit most critically being felt in Queensland.

It is perhaps understandable that Ellis chose both his home-state Chief Mechanical Engineer and Assistant Secretary (C. Raymond) to assist in the investigation which eventually arrived at a recommendation to use the Garratt type for all Australian narrow-gauge systems; QR itself apparently not represented in the eventual recommendation. Once the decision had been made to proceed with the ASG, Ellis elevated Mills to Controller of Locomotive and Rollingstock Construction for the Ministry of Munitions with responsibility for the actual design work.

In the course of their investigation Ellis and Mills had become aware of the Beyer-Peacock & Co. outline drawing № 120328 for a light Garratt-type locomotive and it is apparent that it was on this drawing that Mills later based the specifications for the locomotive he would propose, and go on to design. Mills' design for the ASG was thus a variation of this drawing but he does not appear to have drawn great attention to the fact that he used it as the basis of his plan; hardly surprising as he was a proud man and proud of his design. If it had worked to everybody's satisfaction it would have been an historic first; the only steam locomotive ever designed and built in Australia for availability on all narrow-gauge systems.

At a time when the administrators of the QR had lost the legal right to conduct their empire as they pleased, the way in which the Commonwealth officers approached their task was vital if proper organisation was to be achieved. Clapp and Mills could never be described as conducting their task with tact insofar as the Queenslanders were concerned. For various reasons the QR did not agree that the ASG was the best locomotive for Queensland and did not accept the decision to build them with any degree of enthusiasm.

The means of acquisition of the locomotives thus became the next challenge for the participants. United States builders were too preoccupied with their own wartime production to construct the locomotives, so this left only Great Britain as a manufacturing source if they were not to be built in Australia (although perhaps with some of the material to be obtained from the United States). The problem of British construction was twofold; Britain was at the height of its war effort and it was unrealistic to think that the British could embark on the construction of 127 (as was originally planned) large locomotives when their own munitions industries were pressed to the limit and their ships desperately needed for military transport and supply tasks. The other problem was that the ships involved and their cargos would have risked being lost to enemy action during the long voyage. The British were alive to these problems and Ellis was advised that priority, if any, could be allocated only following a firm order to Britain. If a high priority were then obtained and if a co-operative scheme could be established Australia could probably expect to receive three units per week with the first deliveries to be made six months after order.

One further possibility was for the end-user to build the locomotives themselves under licence from Beyer-Peacock & Co in which case (at that time) a licence fee would have been payable. Enquiries of the WAGR in late 1922 had revealed that Beyer-Peacock & Co had requested £850 per unit as a licence fee for the Garratts the WAGR had at that time been planning to build itself.

Up until 1927, the only lawful manner of obtaining a Garratt was to either have Beyer-Peacock & Co build it or, as was sometimes the case when that firm had sufficient work in hand, a company might be licensed by it to do the work upon payment of a fee. After 1927 however, the global monopoly of Beyer-Peacock & Co, had expired as Garratt's patent came to an end. Anyone obtaining a set of Garratt plans could simply build more of them whenever they wished. Hence it would have been possible for the QR or any entity to build its own Garratts if it so desired or privately if the railway or entity could obtain the plans and adapt them accordingly. Common sense dictates though that it would be wise to use the established experience of Beyer-Peacock & Co to either draw a set of plans specifically for the end-user and to construct at least some of the locomotives in Manchester or to have that company superintend construction at the end-user's facility.

So it was that QR found itself pressed by the CLTB to provide the workshop capacity to construct the locomotives, while struggling to maintain its own war-worn fleet. Although QR had agitated unceasingly for adoption of its B18¼ and C17 classes for the motive-power expansion, Ellis' report neglects to mention the fact that the plans, jigs and patterns for these were immediately available and delivery of them could have been commenced immediately subject only to the availability of material. The C17 could run on the WAGR and the Tasmanian Government Railways, and as the NM class had already run on the Commonwealth Railways.

It seems, therefore, simply common sense that at least one QR officer should have been included in the team of designers of the ASG although, incredibly, not a single one was involved. Special appeals were made by the CLTB to QR to obtain representation so that the locomotive practices of QR would be known in designing the ASG and with the benefit that at least some QR staff would become familiar with the locomotive (after all, the QR was to get ten of the thirty to be built). The appeals were to no avail; QR stated emphatically that no assistance could be given, and in view of the then state of locomotive maintenance in Queensland, Mills felt that little could be done to combat its attitude.

The South Australian Railways resisted Commonwealth requests to defer a programme of locomotive construction but eventually agreed to assemble twelve ASGs at its Islington Railway Workshops although it refused to make officers available to assist with the design work. The New South Wales Government Railways could not undertake assembly work, because its workshops were equipped for only maintenance and new workshops built for locomotive construction were making munitions. They did agree though, that their locomotives then being built by Clyde Engineering could be deferred in favour of that company assembling ASGs, and promised staff to carry out inspections of construction. The Tasmanian Government Railways, claimed Mills, also agreed to defer its locomotive construction programme and the Victorian Railways and WAGR agreed likewise and further, offered their workshops as assembly places. Thus assembly was to take place at four locations: Midland Railway Workshops (Western Australia), Islington Railway Workshops (South Australia), Newport Workshops (Victoria), and Clyde Engineering (New South Wales).

As a consequence Mills surrounded himself with twelve design staff from the various systems as follows: NSWGR – 6, VR – 4, WAGR – 1, and TGR – 1. The VR provided premises in Melbourne for the drawing office and lent other officers to assist the ASG programme in other ways. The absurdity had been reached though, that most of the designers were to come from the states that were not going to be allocated any ASGs and whose systems were wider-gauge.

The first ASGs eventually commenced service with QR, with a VR locomotive inspector provided to assist the Queensland enginemen. They were considered by both QR and its enginemen to be deficient in many respects — and later, perhaps even unsafe due to their unflanged leading driving wheels — and met with great resistance. Mills' intransigence to criticism did not place him in a good light following an eventual Royal Commission into the ASG and also meant that modifications that may have resulted in their successful operation were delayed or refused and the locomotives were finally withdrawn to become monuments to human folly of various categories; but perhaps mostly hubris.

In his comprehensive historical work (see ref. 4 below) Alan Whiting has a final, erudite word on the conception and development of the ASG. He states of the development and construction of the ASG, "The reality was, despite the QRG's lethargy, whether justifiable or not, there is no excuse for the Commonwealth through the agency of Clapp and Mills, visiting upon the QGR and its military users what stands out as a disaster unprecedented in the history of locomotive engineering in Australia."

== Locomotive Designs ==
From his appointment as Locomotive Design Draftsman in 1926 a new era of locomotive design for the WAGR began. Designs introduced by Mills over his career include:

- WAGR Dm Class 4-6-4T
- WAGR S Class 4-8-2 (the only class of steam locomotive to be completely conceived, designed and built at the Midland Railway Workshops)
- WAGR Dd Class 4-6-4T
- Australian Standard Garratt
- WAGR W Class 4-8-2

Business positions
Preceded by John W.R. Broadfoot	Chief Mechanical Engineer of the Western Australian Government Railways; 1940–1949	Succeeded by Tom Marsland
