= Steam locomotive components =

Glossary of the main components of a typical steam locomotive

Main components found on a typical steam locomotive include:

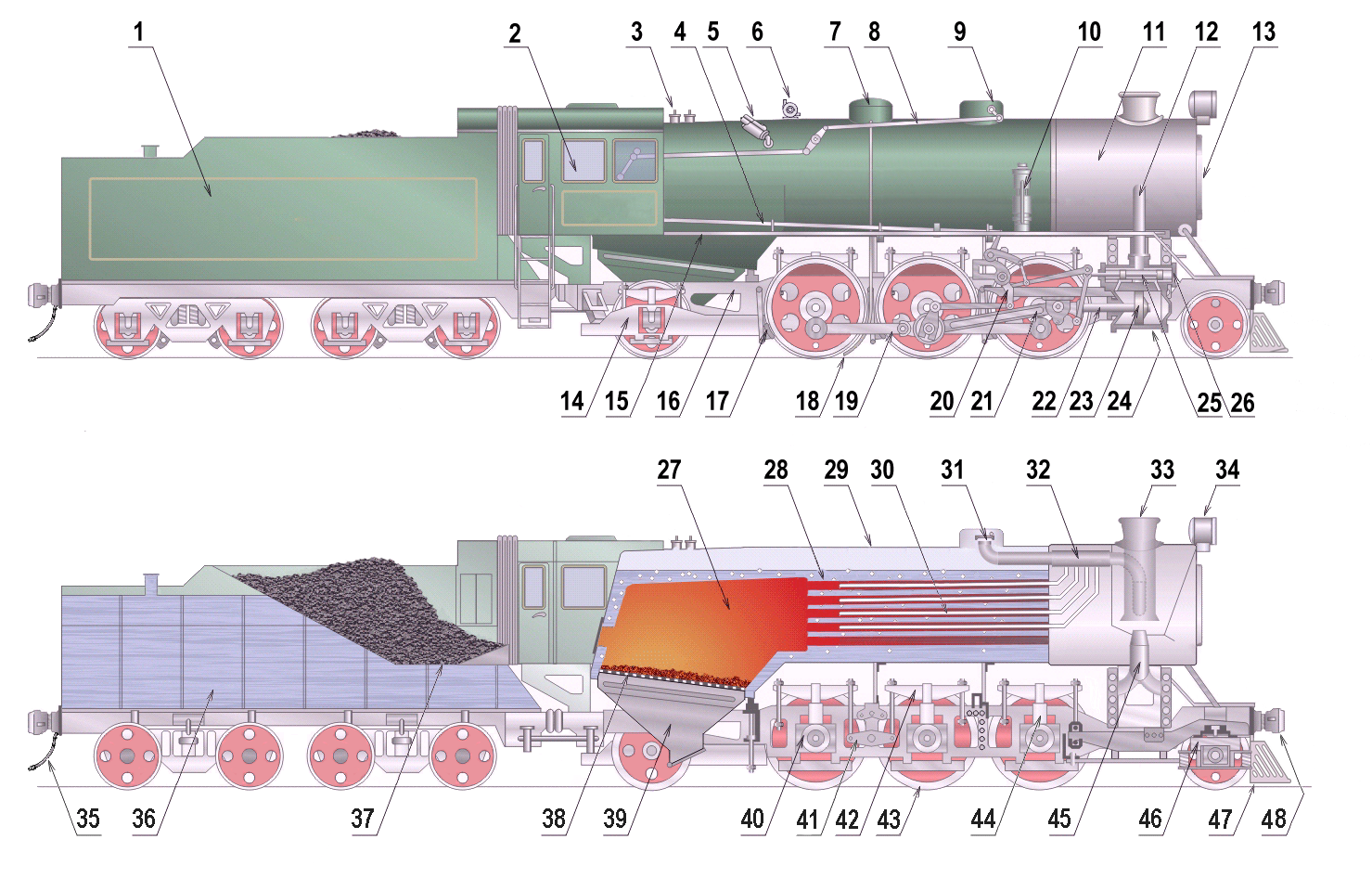
The main components of a typical steam locomotive. Click or hover over numbers to see names. (enlarge)

The diagram, which is not to scale, is a composite of various designs in the late steam era. Some components shown are not the same as, or are not present, on some locomotives – for example, on smaller or articulated types. Conversely, some locomotives have components not listed here.

== Details of the components ==
Alternative names shown below are often, but not always, reflective of differences in terminology in the United Kingdom and some of its former colonies (shown as UK+) and in countries that follow Northern American practice (shown as US+). A slash ( / ) indicates alternative terms in use within the same jurisdiction.

Numbers in parentheses (e.g. 20) point to numbers of related entries, both in this list and in the main diagram.

1. Tender
  Attached rail vehicle that holds both water for the boiler and fuel such as wood, coal, or oil.
2. Cab (US+ and UK+)
  Footplate (UK+)
  Compartment where the engineer (US+) / driver (UK+) and fireman control the locomotive and tend the steam supply and firebox. They achieve that using various devices, most of which are on the rear surface of the firebox, called the "backhead":
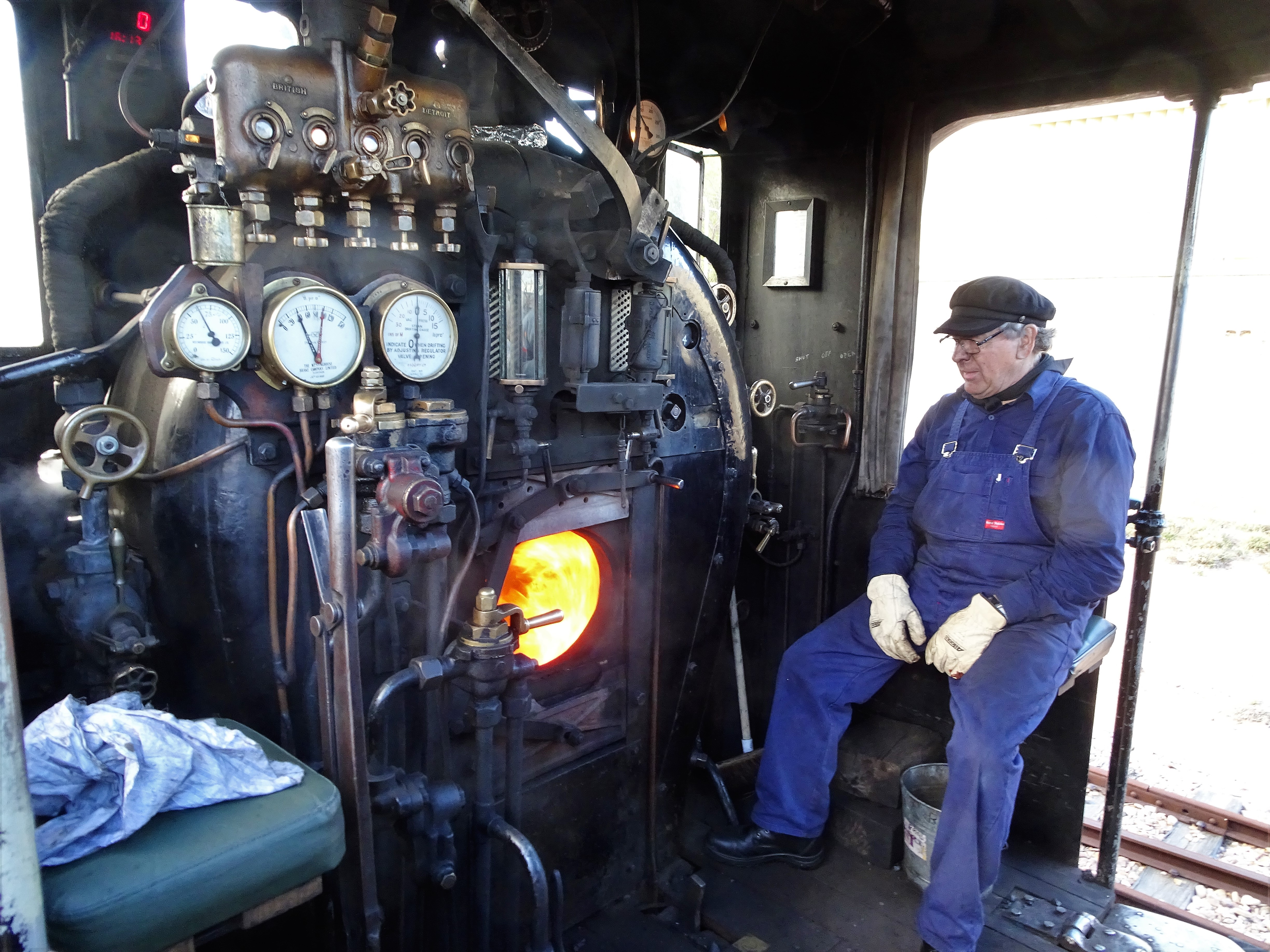
  Most controls are mounted on the boiler's backhead, as on this narrow-gauge Commonwealth Railways NM class locomotive operated by the Pichi Richi Railway in South Australia
  Boiler backhead of a South Australian Railways 620 class locomotive built in 1936
  - a throttle lever or regulator, which controls the amount of steam entering the cylinders
  - a reversing lever or (US term) Johnson bar, which controls the timing of the admission of steam into the locomotive's cylinders. This is required for two purposes. One is to reverse the locomotive's direction, e.g. when shunting. The other is to enable more fuel-efficient operation when the locomotive is running in a steady state: the throttle is set wide open and the power output is controlled by moving the reversing lever closer to its mid-point ("reducing the cut-off") to limit the amount of steam admitted to the cylinders.
  - a train brake lever, which controls the application of brakes throughout the length of the train and a locomotive brake lever, controlling brakes on the locomotive only
  - steam pressure gauges, which show the pressure of the steam in the boiler
  - injector valves, which allow steam to force water into the boiler when needed
  - water gauges, which allow the level of water in the boiler to be monitored
  - mechanical stoker controls (when fitted to larger coal-fired locomotives) or oil feed controls for oil-fired locomotives
  - lubricator glasses, which allow the flow of lubricating oil to be monitored
  - a blower valve, which regulates the steam supplied to the blower (11)
  - a whistle lever, which varies the steam supplied to the whistle (3)
  - blowdown (or blow-off) cocks, which allow water to be ejected from the boiler to avoid concentration of impurities remaining after evaporation of steam.
3. Safety valve
  Pressure relief valve to stop the boiler pressure exceeding the operating limit. The diagram shows two; in later years more than one was usually provided, in case one should fail. When two or more are fitted, they may be set to different pressures, so that if the pressure excess is small, just one valve will open.
4. Reach rod
  Rod linking the reversing lever (US: Johnson Bar) or reversing lever or wheel (UK+) in the cab to the valve gear.
5. Whistle
  Steam powered whistle, located on top of the boiler and used for signalling (by the number and length of notes) and warning of approach.
6. Dynamo / turbo-generator / generator
  Electrical generator driven by a small steam turbine, for the headlight and other locomotive lighting.
7. Sand dome
  Holds sand that is directed on to the rail in front of the driving wheels to improve traction, especially in wet or icy conditions or when vegetation is on the line, and on steep gradients.
8. Throttle lever (US+)
  Regulator (UK+)
  Sets the opening of the throttle valve / regulator valve, (31) which controls the amount of steam entering the cylinders, hence the speed of the locomotive. It is used in conjunction with the reversing lever to start, to stop, and to control the locomotive's power output. When the regulator/throttle is closed, a vacuum valve (snifting valve) permits air to be drawn through the superheater and cylinders to allow the engine to coast freely. The throttle is not the only control that can limit the locomotive's power output: during steady-state running of most locomotives, the throttle is usually set wide open and the power output is controlled by moving the reversing lever (2) closer to its mid-point ("reducing the cut-off") to limit the amount of steam admitted to the cylinders.
9. Steam dome
  Collects steam at the top of the boiler (well above the water level) so that it can be fed to the engine via the main steam pipe, or dry pipe, and the regulator/throttle valve.
10. Air pump / air compressor
  Westinghouse pump (US+)
  Powered by steam, it compresses air for operating the train air brake system. The Westinghouse air brake system is used world-wide; in Europe two systems that use the same principle are the Kunze-Knorr and Oerlikon systems. It can be a single-stage or, when larger capacity is needed, a two-stage cross-compound compressor. Vacuum brakes, used historically, do not employ compressors; as a result of their relative inefficiency they are no longer in large-scale use.
11. Smokebox
  Receives the hot gases that have passed from the firebox through the boiler tubes and, when the throttle/regulator is open, directs them and steam exhausting from the cylinders up the smokestack/chimney, sucking air through the firebed. The smokebox may contain a cinder guard to prevent hot cinders being expelled. Components in the smokebox are:
  Blower
  Vertical pipe below the chimney petticoat pipe, with holes to blow steam upwards. Provides a draught to maintain adequate combustion – and to prevent smoke and flames from entering the cab through the firebox door – when the blastpipe is insufficiently effective, for example when a locomotive is stationary or the throttle/regulator is closed such as when coasting into a station; also helps to draw the fire when lighting up.
  Petticoat pipe / apron (US+ and UK+)
  Vertical pipe with a bellmouth-shaped lower end extending down from the smokestack into the smokebox; enhances and equalizes draft through the boiler tubes.
12. Steam pipe
  Carries steam to the cylinders.
13. Smokebox door
  Hinged circular door to allow service access to the smoke box to fix air leaks and remove cinders.
14. Trailing truck (US+)
  Rear bogie (UK+)
  Wheels at the rear of the locomotive to help support the rear of the locomotive and improve riding qualities – see also Pilot truck (46).
15. Foot board / run board / running board / tread plate
  Walkway around the locomotive, from the cab front, to facilitate inspection and maintenance.
16. Frame
  The strong, rigid structure that carries the boiler, cab and engine unit; supported on driving wheels (43) and leading and trailing trucks (14, 46). The axles run in slots in the frames. Early American locomotives had bar frames, made from steel bar; in the 20th century they usually had cast steel frames or, in the final decades of steam locomotive design, a cast steel locomotive bed – a one-piece steel casting for the entire locomotive frame, cylinders, valve chests, steam pipes, and smokebox saddle, all as a single component. British locomotives usually had plate frames made from steel plate but some end-of-era designs included cast steel sub-frames.
17. Brake shoe / brake block
  Cast iron or composite material that rubs on all the driving wheel treads for braking.
18. Sand pipe
  Deposits sand directly in front of the driving wheels to aid traction on steep gradients, when starting or when the rail surface is not dry and clean.
19. Coupling rods / side rods
  Connect the driving wheels (43) together.
20. Valve gear
  Motion (UK+)
  System of rods and linkages synchronising the valves with the pistons and controls the running direction and power of the locomotive.
21. Connecting rod / main rod
  Steel arm that converts the reciprocating motion of the piston into a rotary motion of the driving wheels. The connection between piston and main rod is a crosshead, which slides on a horizontal bar behind the cylinder.
22. Piston rod
  Connects the piston to the cross-head.
23. Piston
  Produces the motion for the locomotive from expansion of the steam. Driven backward and forward within the cylinder by steam delivered alternately, in front and behind, by the valve.
24. Cylinder
  Chamber that receives steam from the steam pipe.
25. Valve
  Controls the supply of steam to the cylinders. The valve gear, actuated by connection to the driving wheels, ensures that steam is delivered to the piston with precision. Types are slide valves, piston valves or poppet valves.
26. Valve chest / steam chest
  Valve chamber next to the cylinder (24) containing passageways to distribute steam to the cylinders.
27. Firebox
  Furnace chamber built into the boiler, which produces steam in surrounding water. Various combustible materials can be used as fuel; the most common are coal and oil but in earlier times coke and/or wood were used.
28. Boiler tubes and flues
  Carry hot gases from the front of the firebox to the front of the boiler, producing steam from the surrounding water. Flues are larger in diameter than tubes because they contain superheater units.
29. Boiler
  Horizontal tubular vessel, strong enough to contain high-pressure steam in a harsh working environment; closed at either end by the firebox and tube plate. Usually well filled with water but with space for steam – produced by heat from the firebox and boiler tubes – to be above the water surface.
30. Superheater tubes
  Pass steam back through the boiler to dry and superheat it for greater efficiency. See Superheater (32).
31. Throttle valve (US+)
  Regulator valve (UK+)
  Controlled by the throttle lever / regulator (8), regulates the amount of steam delivered to the cylinders, which is one of two ways to vary power of the engine (throttle governing). For the other method, see Throttle lever (8).
32. Superheater
  Provides additional heat – as much as 300 °F (167 °C) hotter – to steam that has been generated in the boiler by sending it back through superheat tubes located in the boiler tubes (28), thus increasing engine efficiency and power. See also Superheater tubes (30).
33. Smokestack (US+)
  Chimney, funnel (UK+)
  Vertical pipe on top of and inside the smokebox that ejects the exhaust (smoke and steam) above the locomotive.
34. Headlight
  Light on the front of the smoke box to illuminate track ahead and warn of the approach of the locomotive.
35. Brake hose
  Hose for conveying force to train brakes by a differential in air pressure. Contains either high-pressure compressed air or air at lower than atmospheric pressure (vacuum), depending on whether the locomotive has an air brake or vacuum brake system.
36. Water compartment
  Tank for water to be used by the boiler to produce steam.
37. Coal bunker
  Compartment for storage of fuel before being directed to the firebox. When the fuel is coal (and in the distant past, coke or wood), the fireman shovels it manually through the firebox door or, in larger locomotives, by operating a mechanical stoker. When the fuel is oil, it is sprayed into the firebox from a sealed tank.
38. Grate
  Supports the burning fuel while allowing the products of combustion – ash and small clinker – to drop through.
39. Ashpan hopper
  Collects the ash from the fire.
40. Journal box (US+)
  Axle box (UK+)
  Housing for the bearing on the axle of a wheel (43).
41. Equalising beams / equalising levers / equalising bars
  Part of the locomotive suspension system. Its function is to prevent inequalities in the track or roadbed putting an excessive load on an axle, which is especially necessary on uneven or poorly laid tracks. The beam is connected at each end to a spring on an axle or to the end of another equalising beam (usually via a vertical spring hanger) to distribute the locomotive's weight between two or more axles. The frontmost and rearmost components are secured to the locomotive frame. An equalising system links not only the driving-wheel axles but also the trailing and/or leading truck axle(s).
42. Leaf springs
  Main suspension springs for the locomotive. Each driving wheel supports its share of the locomotive's weight via leaf springs that connect the axle's journal box / axle box (40) to the frame.
43. Driving wheels
  Drivers (US+)
  Coupled wheels (UK+)
  Wheels coupled to the main/side rods, through which the power developed in the cylinders (24) is transformed into tractive power at the rails. The weight of bearings and coupling rods on the driving wheels is counterbalanced with cast-in weights to reduce "hammering" on the track when the locomotive is under way.
44. Pedestal / saddle
  Connects a leaf spring to a journal box / axle box (40) on a wheel.
45. Blast pipe
  Exhaust pipe (US+)
  Directs exhaust steam up the smokestack/chimney (33), creating a draught that draws hot gases through the firebox (27) and along the boiler tubes (28).
46. Pilot truck, pony truck (US+)
  Leading bogie / lead truck / bissel truck (UK+)
  Wheels at the front of the locomotive to guide the front driving wheels around curves, and minimise yawing at higher speeds with the attendant risk of derailment. The truck has some side motion and is equalised to the driving wheels (41). The names Pony truck (US+) and Bissel (or Bissell) truck (UK+) apply when there are two wheels; the others when there are four.
47. Pilot / cowcatcher (US+)
  A shield made from bars, cast steel or sheet steel to prevent an object on the track from going under the locomotive and possibly derailing the train.
48. Coupler (US+)
  Coupling (UK+)
  Device at the front and rear of the locomotive for connecting locomotives and rolling stock.

== See also ==
- Glossary of boiler terms
- Glossary of rail transport terms
- Horsepower#Drawbar power
- Power classification
- Tractive effort
