= Silverton Tramway W class =

Australian Steam Locomotive

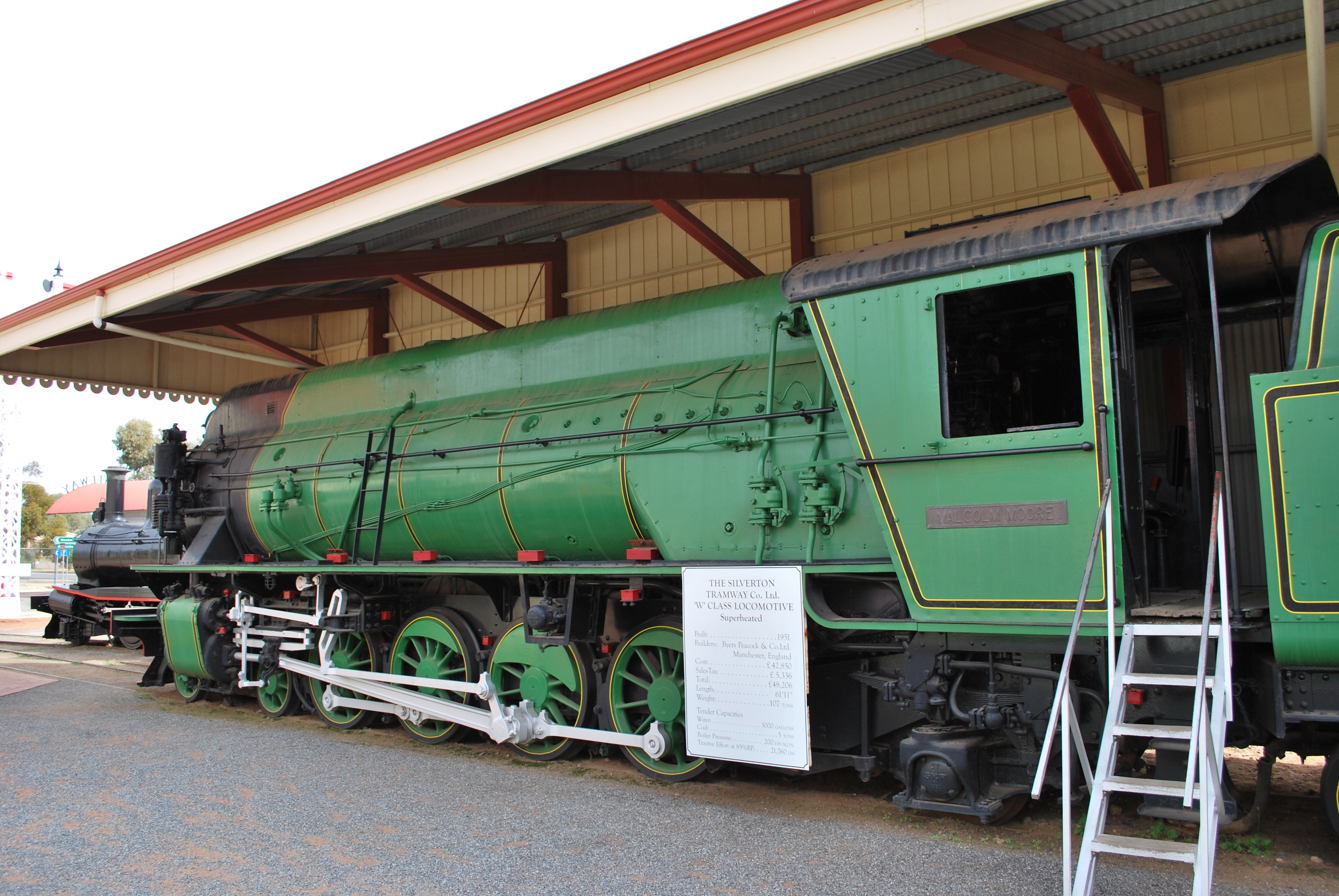
- W24 Malcolm Moore at Sulphide Street Museum in August 2009
Type and origin
- Power type: Steam
- Designer: Frederick Mills; Beyer, Peacock & Co
- Builder: Beyer, Peacock & Co
- Serial number: 7418-7419, 7553-7554
- Build date: 1951
- Total produced: 4
Specifications
- Configuration
  - Whyte: 4-8-2
- Gauge: 1,067 mm (3 ft 6 in)
- Driver dia.: 4 ft 0 in (1,219 mm)
- Length: 61 ft 10.9 in (18.87 m)
- Total weight: 102 long tons 0 cwt (228,500 lb or 103.6 t)
- Fuel type: Coal
- Water cap.: 3,000 imp gal (14,000 L; 3,600 US gal)
- Tender cap.: 5 long tons 0 cwt (11,200 lb or 5.1 t)
- Firebox
  - Grate area: 27 sq ft (2.5 m^{2})
- Boiler pressure: 200 lbf/in^{2} (1.38 MPa)
- Cylinder size: 16 in × 24 in (406 mm × 610 mm)
- Valve gear: Walschaerts
- Loco brake: Westinghouse air
Performance figures
- Tractive effort: 21,760 lbf (96.79 kN)
- Factor of adh.: 4.43
Career
- Operators: Silverton Tramway Company
- Numbers: W22–W25
- Last run: 1961
- Preserved: W22, W24, W25
- Disposition: 3 preserved, 1 scrapped

The Silverton Tramway W class was a class of 4-8-2 steam locomotives operated by the Silverton Tramway Company.

== History ==
In January 1949, the Silverton Tramway Company ordered two 4-8-2 locomotives from Beyer, Peacock & Co, Manchester, to the same design as the Western Australian Government Railways W class. A further two were ordered in November 1950.

All four arrived at Port Pirie in October 1951 and, after final assembly, moved to Broken Hill in a convoy, with two in steam. Until 1953, all were hired to the South Australian Railways on a rotating basis, operating services out of Peterborough, until the South Australian Railways 400 class locomotives were delivered.

The Silverton W class differed from the WAGR examples in having a skyline cowling running the length of the boiler and smokebox, Westinghouse air brakes, and an additional blow-down valve in the middle of the bottom of the boiler barrel.

When the 48s class diesels arrived in 1961, the W class locomotives were retired, after only 10 years in service. They remained in store until disposed of in 1970, with three now preserved. The Pichi Richi Railway has a locomotive operating as W22, although it is actually W916 masquerading as W22, including some parts from the latter.

== Class list ==
Number	Name	Builder's number	Image	Notes
W22	Justin Hancock	7418		preserved by Puffing Billy Railway, Melbourne until 1999, moved to Pichi Richi Railway used for spares in the restoration of W916 as W22
W23	Thomas B Birkbeck	7419		scrapped 1970
W24	Malcolm Moore	7552		preserved Sulphide Street Museum
W25	HF (Gerry) Walsh	7553		preserved National Railway Museum, Port Adelaide
