= S-Type =

S-Type may refer to:

- S-type asteroid, asteroids with siliceous mineralogical composition
- S type fuse, electrical fuses with an Edison base
- S-type granite, a category of granite
- S-type star, a cool giant with equal carbon and oxygen in its atmosphere
- S-type orbit, type of planetary orbit in a binary system
- Bedford S type, a truck 1950–1959
- Jaguar S-Type (disambiguation), two makes of car
- Jensen S-type, a car
- Renault S-Type engine, or Sofim 8140, a car engine
- Soviet S-class submarine, during World War 2
- New South Wales S type carriage stock, an Australian railway carriage
- Victorian Railways S type carriage, an Australian railway carriage

== See also ==
- Class S (disambiguation)
- Type S (disambiguation)
- S class (disambiguation)
