= WAGR Dm class =

Class of Australian 4-6-4T locomotives

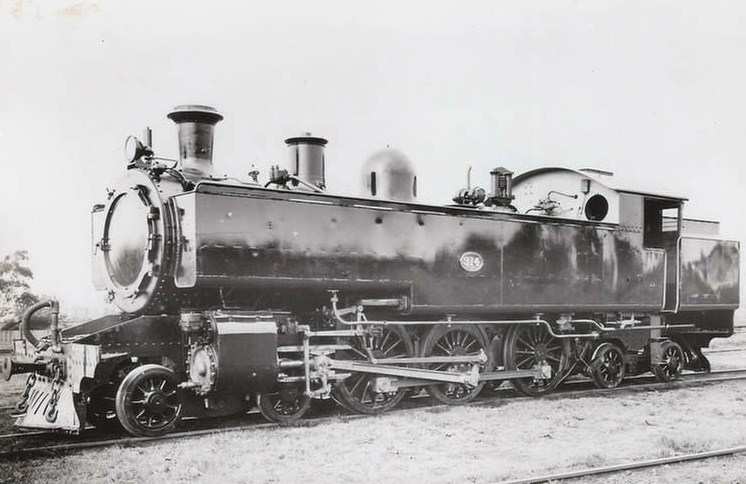
- Dm314 in as new condition, 1945
Type and origin
- Power type: Steam
- Builder: Midland Railway Workshops
- Build date: 1945
- Total produced: 8
Specifications
- Configuration
  - Whyte: 4-6-4T
- Gauge: 3 ft 6 in (1,067 mm)
- Driver dia.: 4 ft 6 in (1,372 mm)
- Length: 43 ft 3 in (13.18 m)
- Loco weight: 71 long tons 9 cwt (160,000 lb or 72.6 t)
- Fuel type: Coal
- Water cap.: 1,820 imp gal (8,300 L; 2,190 US gal)
- Firebox
  - Grate area: 18.6 sq ft (1.73 m^{2})
- Boiler pressure: 160 lbf/in^{2} (1.10 MPa)
- Cylinder size: 18 in × 23 in (457 mm × 584 mm)
Performance figures
- Tractive effort: 18,768 lbf (83.48 kN)
- Factor of adh.: 4.7
Career
- Operators: Western Australian Government Railways
- Numbers: Dm581-Dm588
- Disposition: all scrapped

The WAGR Dm class was a class of 4-6-4T tank locomotive operated by the Western Australian Government Railways (WAGR) between 1945 and 1971.

== Background ==
World War II was a major setback for Western Australia's railway system. The need to move large numbers of troops and material had taken its toll on the ability of the railways to continue the construction of much needed motive power. During the war years only 13 new locomotives were built, three S class and 10 Australian Standard Garratts. By 1944, approximately a quarter of the WAGR's locomotive fleet was out of action pending maintenance. Much of it was over forty years old.

== History ==
The Dm class was based on the earlier D class but differed significantly in the addition of large boiler-length side tanks, and was built by converting older E class tender locomotives. They were built to haul suburban passenger services in Perth. They were also used as bank engines on the steeply graded Midland Junction to Chidlow section of the Eastern Railway.

The first entered service on 29 March 1945. The first was withdrawn in 1968, with the remainder in 1970/71 following the entry into service of the ADK/ADB class diesel multiple units.

== Class list ==
The numbers and periods in service of each member of the Dm class were as follows:

Road number	Earlier number	In service	Withdrawn	Notes
581	314	29 March 1945	15 March 1968	Rebuilt from Es 314, renumbered 20 September 1945
582	309	17 May 1945	10 September 1970	Rebuilt from Es 309, renumbered 19 September 1945
583	307	14 July 1945	10 September 1970	Rebuilt from Es 307, renumbered 7 September 1945
584		24 August 1945	22 July 1969	Rebuilt from E 306, number plate preserved at Castledare Miniature Railway
585		14 September 1945	10 September 1970	Rebuilt from Es 296
586		10 October 1945	17 June 1971	Rebuilt from Es 318
587		3 November 1945	17 June 1971	Rebuilt from Es 310
588		23 November 1945	17 June 1971	Rebuilt from Es 305

== See also ==
- Rail transport in Western Australia
- List of Western Australian locomotive classes
