= Class S =

Class S may refer to:

- Class S (culture), early 20th century Japanese social practice of female romantic friendships, and a literary genre depicting this practice
- Class S, a stellar classification for carbon stars
- Baltimore and Ohio class S, American steam locomotives
- BNCR Class S, Irish steam locomotive
- GNRI Class S, Irish steam locomotive
- South African Class S 0-8-0, steam locomotives

== See also ==
- Type S (disambiguation)
- S class (disambiguation)
- S-Type (disambiguation)
