= Type S =

Type S may refer to:

- Acura Type-S, the high-performance division of Acura
- Driving Emotion Type-S, a racing game
- FBA Type S, a French flying boat
- Handley Page Type S, a prototype British carrier-based fighter
- Lohner Type S, an Austro-Hungarian flying boat
- NW S, an Austro-Hungarian automobile introduced in 1906
- Seversky A8V1 Type S Two Seat Fighter
- Toyota Type S engine, a straight-4 automobile engine
- a type S thermocouple

== See also ==
- S class (disambiguation)
- S-Type (disambiguation)
- Class S (disambiguation)
