= Commonwealth Railways NB class =

Two small saddle-tank steam locomotives

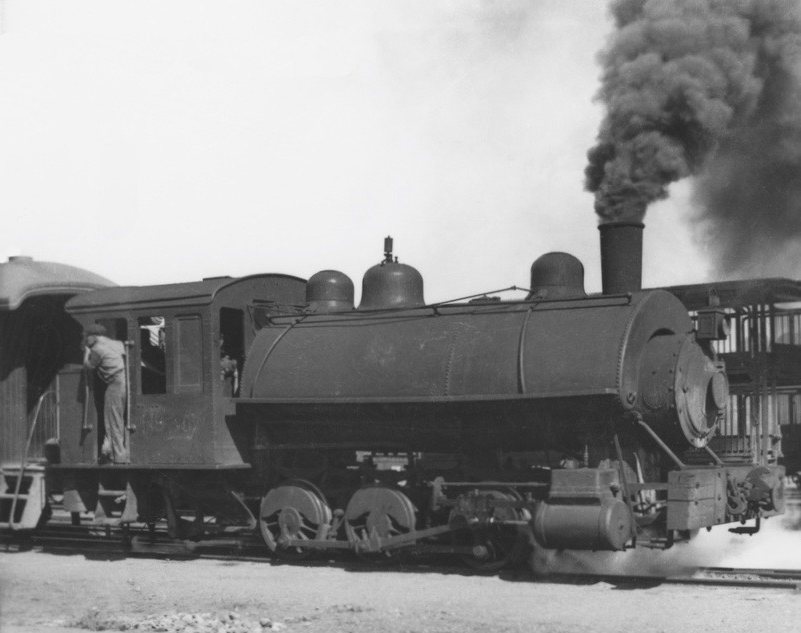
Locomotive NB30 shunting a passenger car at Quorn in 1949

The Commonwealth Railways NB class originated in a shipment of four 0-6-0, 1067 millimetres (3 feet 6 inches) gauge, saddle tank steam locomotives built by the Vulcan Iron Works of Wilkes-Barre, Pennsylvania. They were imported to Australia in 1916 for construction work at the naval base at Henderson, Western Australia. (Note: A representative of the class was acquired by the Bellarine Railway locomotive no. 4, one of the two locomotives that did not go to the Commonwealth Railways, was donated to the heritage line in 1968 by Australian Portland Cement Ltd, which had deployed it on its Fyansford Cement Works Railway. It spent some years hauling short tourist trains. As of 2020, it was in storage.) Their tractive effort was 9500 pounds.

In 1925 two of them (builder's numbers 2532 and 2533) were acquired by the Commonwealth Railways and placed in service on the Central Australia Railway as NB29 and NB30 respectively. After shunting for two decades at Quorn, where they were nicknamed "pugs", the two locomotives were set aside. NB29 was written off in 1946 and scrapped in 1958. NB30 was written off in 1950.

== Conversion to diesel – NB30 ==
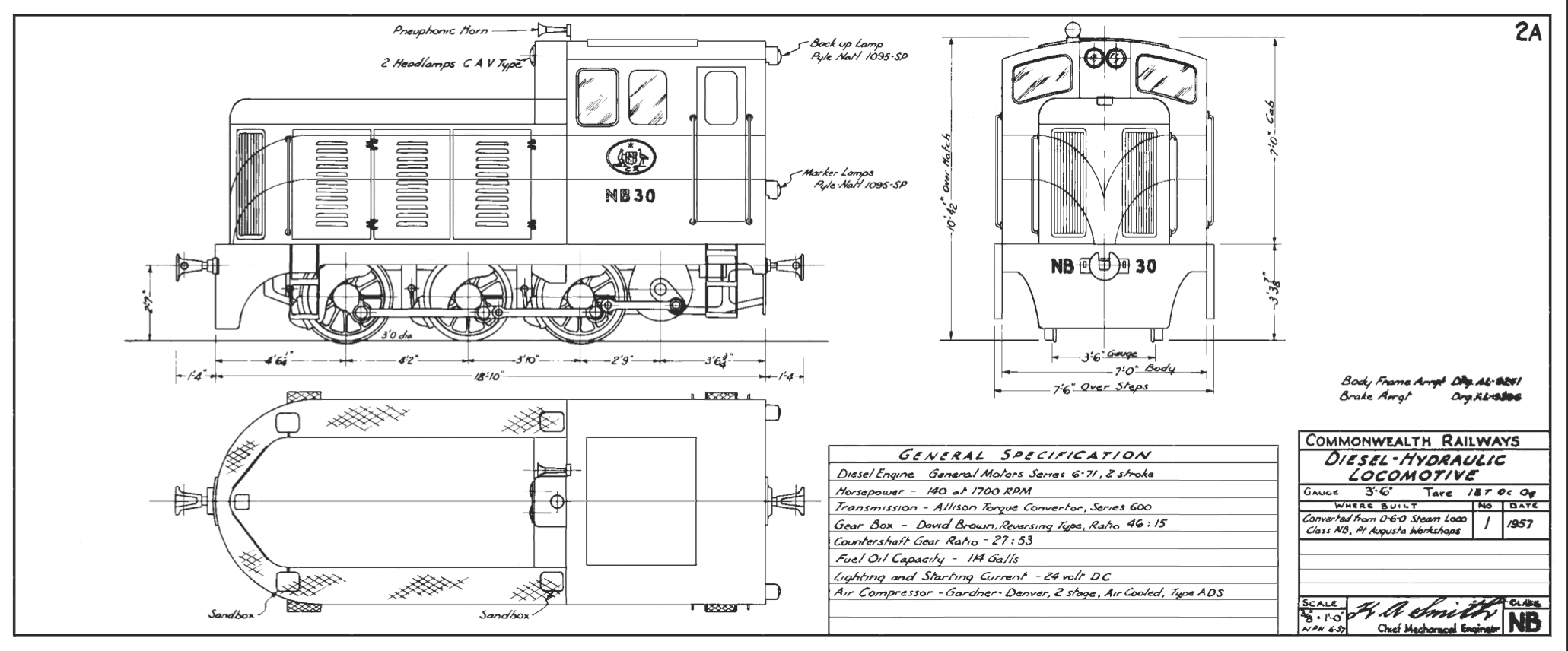
General arrangement of NB30 designed as a diesel-hydraulic

In 1957, the frame and wheels of NB30 were used as the basis of a small diesel-hydraulic locomotive designed and built at Commonwealth Railways' Port Augusta workshops. (Note: Specifications included power output of 140 bhp (100 kW) – from a General Motors model 6/71, 4.5 inches (110 mm) bore x 5 inches (130 mm) in stroke, 6-in-line, 2-stroke diesel engine – at 1700 rpm; maximum speed limit 20 mph (32 km/h); and a maximum axle load of 6 tons (6.1 tonnes). Other specifications are in the general arrangement diagram.) Retaining its number, NB30 was initially used in recovering rails from the closed Brachina–Hawker section of the Central Australia Railway, after which it was assigned to Quorn for shunting work. It was then transferred to Port Augusta for use as a workshops shunter, where it was withdrawn from service in 1972.

In 1979, NB30 was donated to the Pichi Richi Railway by the successor to the Commonwealth Railways, the Australian National Railways Commission, whose chairman, Keith Smith, had been the Chief Mechanical Engineer who had overseen its design. As of 2020, the heritage railway employed the locomotive on shunting duties.
