= S-class submarine =

Five classes of submarine are known as the S class:

- The British S-class submarine (1914) of three boats built by Scotts of Greenock in 1914–1915 and transferred to the Italian Regia Marina in 1915
- The Italian S-class submarine of the Italian Regia Marina consisted of three boats built by Laurenti-Fiat between 1914 and 1919
- The United States S-class submarine of the United States Navy of 51 boats built between 1918 and 1925
- The British S-class submarine (1931) of the British Royal Navy of 62 boats built in the 1930s and 1940s
- The Soviet S-class submarine of World War II vintage
- The Ha-9-class submarine also called Type S of the Imperial Japanese Navy of 2 boats built between 1917 and 1920
