= W-class destroyer =

W-class destroyer may refer to:

- V and W-class destroyer, a class of Royal Navy destroyers built late in World War I
- W and Z-class destroyer, a class of Royal Navy destroyers launched in 1943–1944
