= WAGR S class =

Class of Australian 4-8-2 locomotives

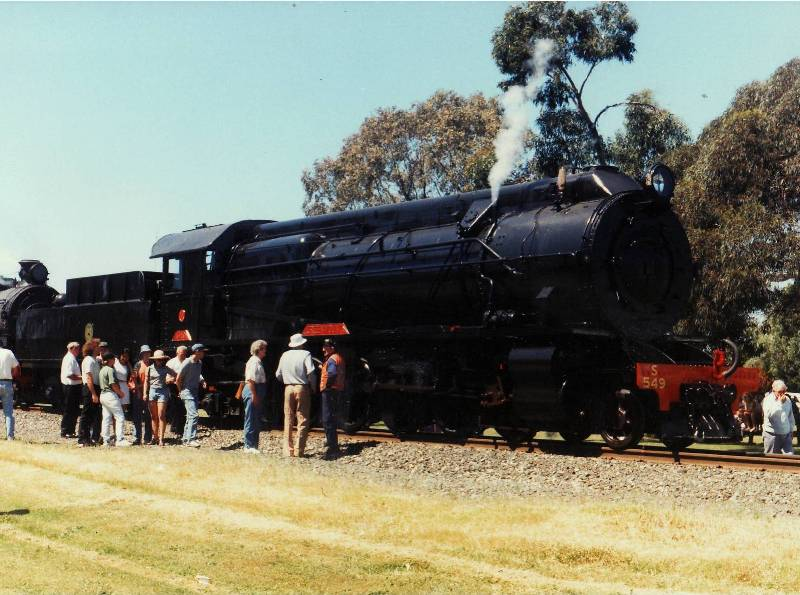
- Preserved S549 Greenmount at Harvey following restoration to working condition
Type and origin
- Power type: Steam
- Designer: Frederick Mills
- Builder: Midland Railway Workshops
- Build date: 1943-1947
- Total produced: 10
Specifications
- Configuration
  - Whyte: 4-8-2
- Gauge: 1,067 mm (3 ft 6 in)
- Total weight: 119 long tons 6 cwt (267,200 lb or 121.2 t)
- Fuel type: Coal
- Fuel capacity: 7 long tons 0 cwt (15,700 lb or 7.1 t)/ 9 long tons 0 cwt (20,200 lb or 9.1 t)
- Water cap.: 5,000 and 3,500 imp gal (23,000 and 16,000 L; 6,000 and 4,200 US gal)
- Firebox
  - Grate area: 40 sq ft (3.7 m^{2})
- Boiler pressure: 200 lbf/in^{2} (1,379 kPa)
- Cylinder size: 19 in × 24 in (483 mm × 610 mm)
- Loco brake: Steam (locomotive); Vacuum (tender)
Performance figures
- Tractive effort: 30,685 lbf (136.49 kN)
Career
- Operators: Western Australian Government Railways
- Numbers: S541-S550
- Retired: 1971-1972
- Preserved: S542, S547, S549
- Disposition: 3 preserved, 7 scrapped

The WAGR S class was a class of 4-8-2 steam locomotives built by the Midland Railway Workshops between 1943 and 1947 and operated by the Western Australian Government Railways (WAGR).

== Details of design ==
The S class locomotives were built with a 4-8-2 wheel arrangement, a configuration commonly used in Australia for heavy goods locomotives, smaller driving wheels giving increased tractive effort at the cost of reduced speed.

== History ==
=== Background ===
In the 1920s and 1930s the West Australian rail system was thoroughly run down. The vast majority of locomotives were well past their useful service life and many were badly in need of repairs. The P and Pr classes had helped alleviate pressure on aging passenger locomotives when introduced in 1924 and 1938 respectively, but more powerful machines were needed with an order for 10 authorised.

=== Operational history ===
The first three were built in 1943, with the remaining seven deferred while Midland Railway Workshops completed its order for 10 Australian Standard Garratts for the Commonwealth Land Transport Board. A further two were completed in 1945, with the remaining five deferred again until 1947 while the Dm and Dd classes were built.

The class was initially intended for service on both passenger and goods services on the Eastern Goldfields Railway between Perth and Kalgoorlie, though following World War II it worked primarily on the South Western Railway. After suffering from a range of early problems (which led to controversy involving the designer Frederick Mills), the class became highly popular and was very successful.

The locomotives were given running-board nameplates and were named after Western Australian mountains, following the tradition established five years earlier with the Pr class, which were named after Western Australian rivers. The locomotives were fitted with steam brakes, the tenders with vacuum brakes. All were fitted with semi-streamlining cowling over the entire length of their tops although this was later removed. The tenders were rebuilt reducing their coal capacity from nine to seven tonnes while increasing their water capacity from 15,900 to 22,700 litres.

Most were condemned in 1971, with S549 operating the last WAGR steam hauled freight service on 24 December 1971.

=== Preservation ===
Three have been preserved:

- S542 Bakewell is plinthed at East Perth Terminal, once the site of the East Perth Locomotive Depot
- S547 Lindsay is preserved on the Bellarine Railway in Victoria
- S549 Greenmount is preserved by Rail Heritage WA, restored to working order in 1995

== Class list ==
The numbers, names and periods in service of each member of the S class were as follows:

Road number	Earlier number	Name	In service	Withdrawn	Notes
541	476	Bruce	11 February 1943	17 June 1971	Renumbered 6 October 1945
542	477	Bakewell	26 June 1943	17 June 1971	Renumbered 21 September 1945, large tender, plinthed at East Perth Terminal, with tender from 547
543	478	Brockman	17 September 1943	17 June 1971	Renumbered 9 October 1945, large tender
544		Hallowell	26 October 1945	17 June 1971	Large tender
545		Dale	15 December 1945	17 June 1971	Large tender
546		Egerton	5 July 1947	17 June 1971	
547		Lindsay	9 August 1947	17 June 1971	Large tender. Preserved at Bellarine Railway, Victoria, with tender from 542
548		Gardner	15 September 1947	17 June 1971	
549		Greenmount	9 October 1947	14 August 1972	Currently being overhauled for the Wheatbelt Heritage Rail project.
550		Hardie	10 November 1947	17 June 1971	

== Namesakes ==
The S class designation was previously used for the S class locomotives that were withdrawn in 1916. It was reused from 1998 when the Westrail S class diesel locomotives entered service.

== See also ==
- Rail transport in Western Australia
- List of Western Australian locomotive classes
