= Pichi Richi Railway =

Working heritage railway in South Australia

Coordinates: 32.34512°S 138.04114°E

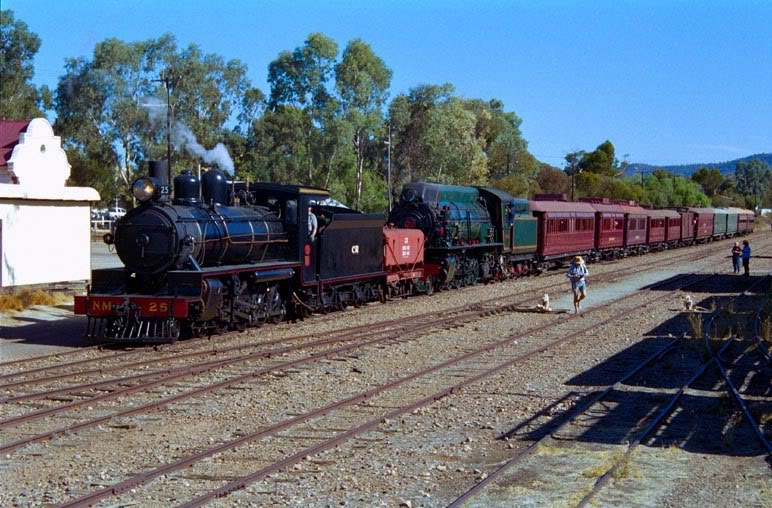
- Two of Pichi Richi Railway's preserved locomotives (NM25 and W916) with a special-event train at Quorn station

Overview
- Status: Working heritage railway
- Owner: 1879–1911: South Australian Railways; 1911–1926: Commonwealth Railways (operated by SAR); 1926–1973: Commonwealth Railways; 1973–present: Pichi Richi Railway Preservation Society
- Locale: Flinders Ranges, South Australia
- Termini: Quorn; Port Augusta
- Stations: Woolshed Flat and Stirling North
- Website: www.pichirichirailway.org.au

Service
- Type: Heritage railway
- System: Section of the former Central Australia Railway
- Rolling stock: Locomotives and carriages of: South Australian Railways; Commonwealth Railways; Western Australian Government Railways; Silverton Tramway

History
- Opened: 1879
- Closed: 1957
- Reopened: 1974 as heritage railway

Technical
- Line length: 40 kilometres (25 mi)
- Track gauge: 1067 mm (3 ft 6 in)
- Highest elevation: Quorn: 293 m (961 ft); Summit: 406 m (1332 ft); Port Augusta: 14 m (46 ft)

Pichi Richi Railway is a narrow-gauge heritage railway, 40 kilometres (25 miles) long, in the southern Flinders Ranges of South Australia between Quorn and Port Augusta. For much of its length the line lies in the picturesque Pichi Richi Pass, where the line was completed in 1879 as work proceeded north to build a railway to the "Red Centre" of Australia – the Central Australia Railway.

The Commonwealth Railways ran trains through the pass until 1970, when it ceased services. There were proposals to demolish the line including the bridges and dry stone walls, but the Quorn Progress Association recognised their heritage value and significance. Lobbying by local and distant supporters reached Mr. Keith Smith, Commissioner of the Commonwealth Railways.

On 22 July 1973, the not-for-profit Pichi Richi Railway Preservation Society Inc. was incorporated, initially to ensure conservation of the 1878 dry stone walls and the bridges in the Pichi Richi Pass. It became evident that the prospect of operating heritage trains was possible and after undertaking restoration of deteriorated sections of the line, the Society operated its first trains to Summit, just 12 months later.

Following further track repairs, trains were able to travel to Pichi Richi, and later to Woolshed Flat. After relaying, the line was restored to Stirling North – at that time the western terminus of the line.

A newly built extension to Port Augusta was opened in 2001.

The Society continues to be completely managed and staffed by its volunteer members and operates its own restored steam and diesel hauled trains on a variety of services between March and November each year.

== Background ==
The line was built initially to service mining in the Flinders Ranges, as part of the South Australian Railways' Port Augusta and Government Gums Railway. It started in 1878 at Port Augusta, proceeded through the Pichi Richi Pass (being opened at Quorn in 1879), and reached the initial terminus at Government Gums (now named Farina) in 1882. The line was extended to Marree (then named Hergott Springs) in 1884 and Oodnadatta in 1891. In keeping with the intention to extend it to become a north–south transcontinental line, it was named the Great Northern Railway in 1882.

When the Commonwealth Railways took over operations in 1926 it had the more prosaic name, given a year earlier, Central Australia Railway. Completed as far as Stuart (renamed in 1930 as Alice Springs) near the centre of Australia, the 1,225 kilometres (761 miles) line never went further north. Nevertheless, it served for a century as a lifeline for isolated outback communities, a vital link for supplies in World War II, and the setting for the famous passenger train, The Ghan. The Pichi Richi section also became the feeder route to the east–west Trans-Australian Railway from 1917 to 1937. It had the steepest gradients of the whole route, necessitated by the refusal of decision makers to heed the advice of surveyors and engineers to stay west of the Flinders Ranges, giving priority instead to servicing promising copper prospects and expected agricultural wealth in the locality. This source of decades of operational nuisance and expense had become, in the lines old age, the source of enjoyment for travellers, as locomotives worked hard to ascend the grades.

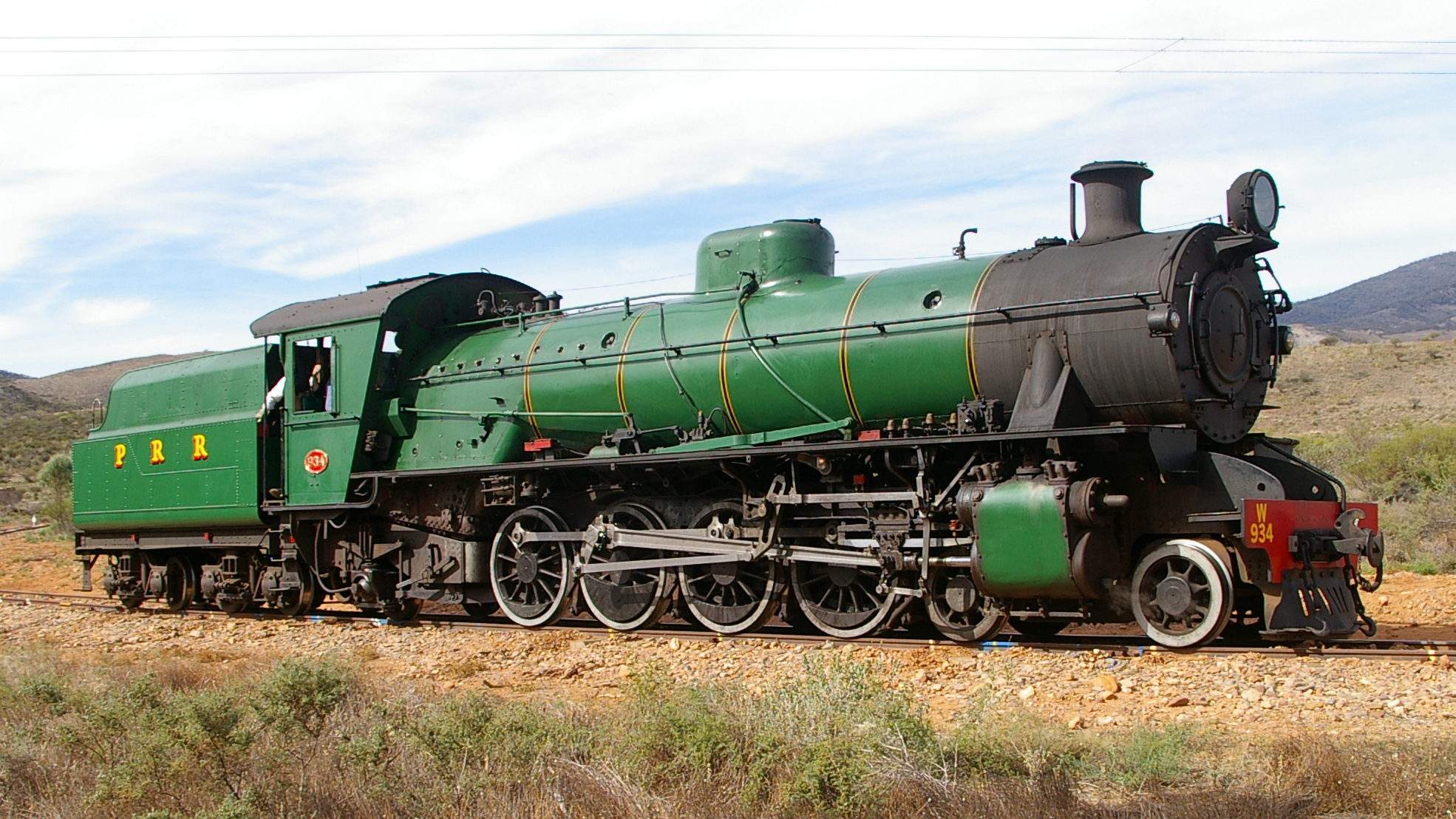
Locomotive W934 at Woolshed Flat in 2012

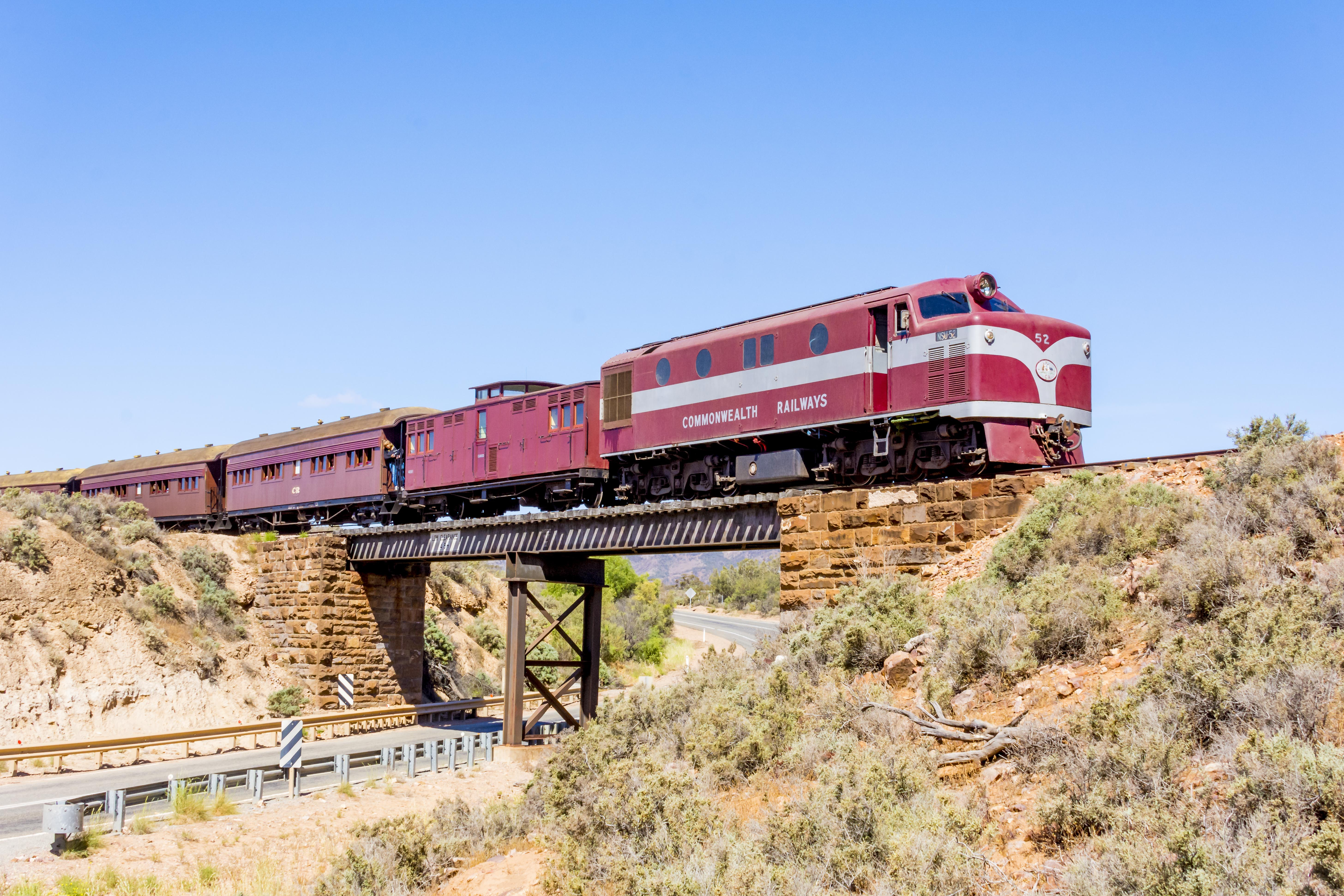
Diesel-electric locomotive NSU 52, unlike the railway's steam locomotives, is able to operate on days of high fire danger

The headquarters of PRRPS is at the Quorn railway station. Restoration and repair work continues to be undertaken by volunteers at the carriage restoration and locomotive workshop. Trains operate through the Pichi Richi Pass to Woolshed Flat and Port Augusta and out of Port Augusta to Quorn. The volunteer organisation has fully restored a fleet of South Australian Railways (SAR), Commonwealth Railways (CR) and Western Australian Government Railways (WAGR) steam and diesel locomotives, passenger and freight rolling stock.

Pichi Richi (1974) (elevation 344 m or 1,129 ft), Woolshed Flat (1979) (elevation 269 m or 883 ft) and Stirling North (1999) on the original alignment, and to Port Augusta (2001) on a new alignment between Stirling North and Port Augusta.

Pichi Richi is the name of the pass through which the railway travels and is also the name of the former township located in the Pass, after which the Society is named. The name Pichi Richi is believed to come from the region being a traditional centre in the production of pituri, a mixture of leaves and ash chewed as a stimulant by the First Nations people in Australia.

== Current operations ==
PRRPS continues to expand the type and number of services as more rolling stock and track is restored and rehabilitated.

The Afghan Express is a return trip to Quorn from Port Augusta (78 kilometres return). This train usually consists of Ghan carriages from the 1920s and is often hauled, wherever possible, by an original Ghan steam locomotive, NM25, and recreates the type of travel experienced on the Ghan in the 1930s and 1940s.

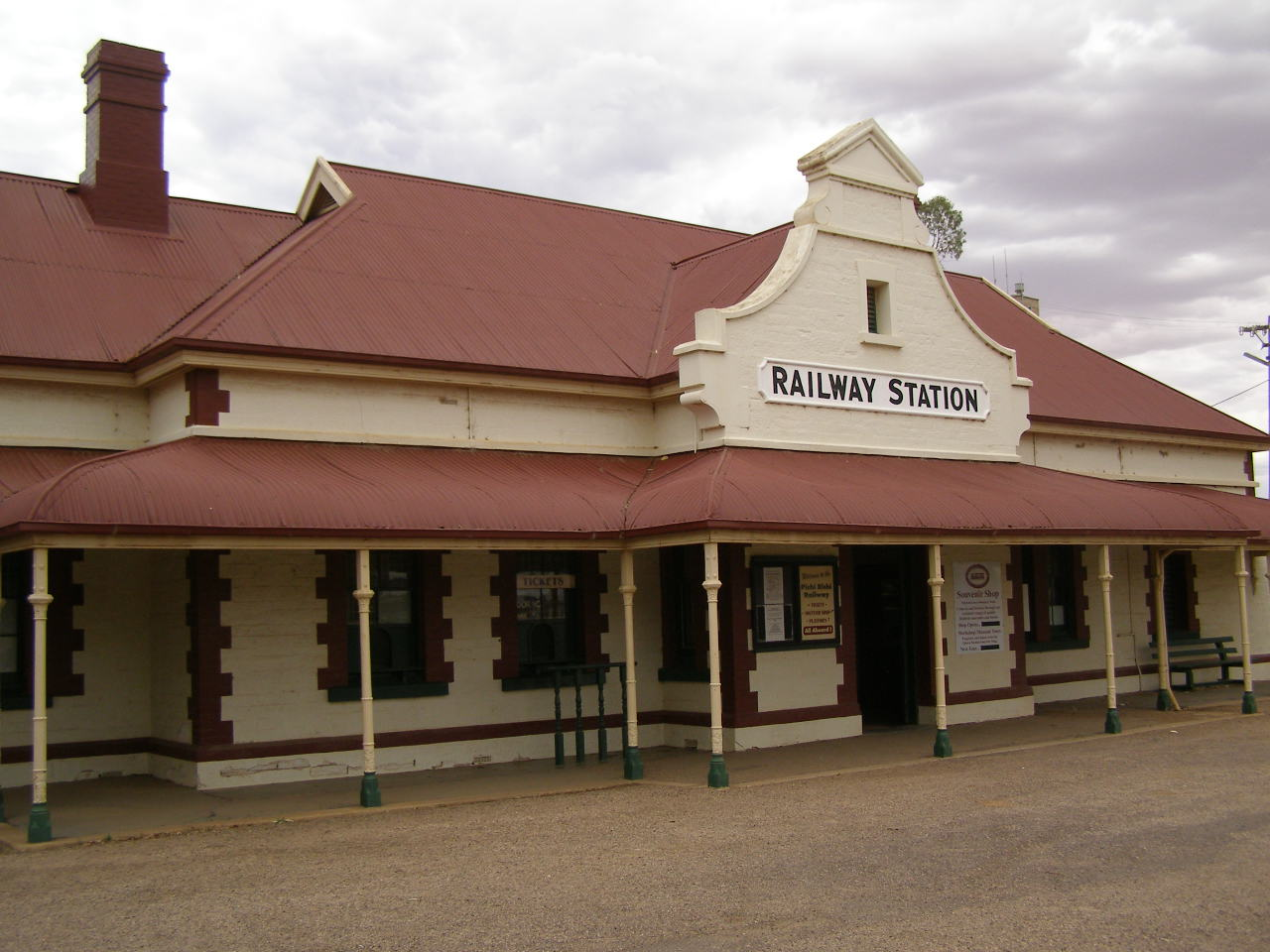
Flinders Ranges Visitor Information Centre, located in Quorn station, together with the Pichi Richi Railway Museum, souvenir shop & ticket office.

A shorter journey, the Pichi Richi Explorer is a return service to Woolshed Flat departing from Quorn (32 kilometres return). Travel on this train is either in South Australian Railway carriages circa 1900 to 1915 hauled by a steam locomotive, or in a 1928 SAR diesel railcar. The use of older SAR rolling stock on this train replicates what it was like to travel by country rail in South Australia in the very early 1900s to the 1960s. Much of this rolling stock was in service until the end of narrow gauge passenger operations by the South Australian Railways.

Steam Motor Coach No. 1, also known affectionately as the "Coffee Pot" is a unique railcar and the last operating example of its type worldwide. Built in 1906, this ornate Edwardian-era steam railcar has been restored by PRR volunteers. It is used for selected services during the train running season, the SMC carries a small number of passengers (in first and second class) on board for a Coffee Pot Heritage Rail Experience day trip from Quorn to Woolshed Flat and return.

Pichi Richi Railway offers other special services including the occasional "double header" steam trains and the trains and carriages are available for private hire, suiting a range of different occasions from weddings to tour groups.

== Major projects ==
The PRRPS has completed a number of major projects since its inception in 1973. These include return to service of steam locomotives and heritage rolling stock, rebuilding large sections of railway line and permanent way and the restoration of historic buildings.

=== Rebuild of steam locomotive NM25 ===
Former Commonwealth Railways steam locomotive NM25 was built in 1925 and was used on the narrow gauge train line between Port Augusta and Alice Springs. It is one of only two surviving examples of this class of steam locomotive. NM25 had remained static from 1965 until 1989, when PRRPS acquired it with the intention of restoring it to operational condition. An overhaul commenced in 2000. The locomotive was recommissioned on 26 April 2003.

=== Track extension to Port Augusta ===
==== History of the project ====
During the Commonwealth Railways era (from 1937 to 1957), the train line between Stirling North and Port Augusta was dual gauge. Narrow gauge served the line to Quorn and the standard gauge, which branched at Stirling North, was for the line to Port Pirie and also to Marree. A new standard gauge line to Marree was built in the 1950s on a new route west of the Pichi Richi Pass, with the purpose of bypassing the narrow gauge section of the Central Australia Railway to Marree, through Quorn and Hawker. The narrow gauge component of the section dual gauge track between Stirling North and Port Augusta was removed once the standard gauge line to Marree was in full operation, and the narrow gauge route from Hawker to Marree had been closed and removed. This meant that the remaining narrow gauge line from Stirling North to Hawker via Quorn was now isolated. On the occasions that a narrow gauge train needed to travel to Port Augusta or to Marree, the train would need to utilise a piggy back system. This arrangement saw the entire narrow gauge train loaded on top of a standard gauge train of flatcars and transported via standard gauge, then unloaded at the destination on to the existing narrow gauge.

The first stage of returning narrow gauge train services to Port Augusta was the completion of 16 kilometres (9.9 mi) of track rehabilitation between Woolshed Flat and Stirling North. This work included the complete replacement of sleepers and rail, re-timbering of several bridges and the construction of a turning triangle at Stirling North. Part of the $1.35 million Pichi Richi Railway Development Plan project, it was completed in 1999. The extension was opened on 24 October 1999 by former Deputy Prime Minister of Australia Tim Fischer.

It was announced in 2000 that funding was available through the State Government of South Australia, and the Port Augusta City Council to extend the train line from Stirling North in to Port Augusta railway station. However, there were significant works required for to complete this project.

==== Crossing the standard gauge ====
Because the existing narrow gauge between Stirling North and Port Augusta had been removed many years earlier, the challenge for the PRRPS was to develop an effective means of reinstating the narrow gauge in to Port Augusta. The greatest aspect to this challenge was how to cross over what remained of the standard gauge line to Marree, which had since been truncated at Telford Cut coal mine near Leigh Creek with the opening of the newer standard gauge line from Tarcoola to Alice Springs in 1980. This line to Leigh Creek was exclusively used for transporting coal from Leigh Creek to Northern Power Station, and branched off the main standard gauge network at Stirling North. Many options for crossing this line were investigated, including a draw bridge arrangement, diamond crossovers and an underpass. The final decision was an underpass, passing below the Leigh Creek coal train line, which greatly reduced the amount of safe working interfacing with the standard gauge line. Diagram.

==== Project completion ====
The remainder of the narrow gauge line was constructed parallel to the standard gauge, ending at platform 2 of Port Augusta station. The South Australian Government donated rail for the project, which the Society lifted and transported from the abandoned Cambrai to Apamurra railway line in South Australia's Murray Mallee region. For Pichi Richi Railway operations originating at the station, a two-road locomotive and carriage storage shed and a run-around track were constructed, and an 18.3-metre (60-foot) turntable donated by Australian Southern Railroad, relocated from Kapunda, was installed to turn steam locomotives and tenders.

==== Other route extension works ====
Other works included:

- earthworks requiring the excavation and placement of approximately 25,000 m^{3} (33,000 cu yd) of material
- dismantling, transporting and relaying of 1300 lengths of 12.2 m (40 ft) long rail totalling 500 tonnes (490 long tons; 550 short tons)
- constructing six turnouts at Port Augusta to provide a run-around loop and access to the storage shed and turntable
- laying about 11,500 redgum and steel sleepers
- using 30,000 second-hand dogspikes, 10,000 screwspikes and 5,200 fishbolts
- transporting, distributing and tamping 8,000 tonnes (7,900 long tons; 8,800 short tons) of track ballast
- designing, manufacturing, transporting and installing 13 large precast concrete culvert crowns and base sections for the underpass – achieved in 60 hours to avoid disrupting coal trains from Leigh Creek
- installing about 1600 pieces of pin-crib walling to the underpass at Stirling North.

The extension was officially opened 15 September 2001 by the local state MP, Graham Gunn, the then state Tourism Minister Joan Hall, and Port Augusta Mayor Joy Baluch.

The extension to Port Augusta won the 2002 Permanent Way Institute (SA Section) Trackwork Achievement Award

=== Other projects ===
Significant projects completed by Pichi Richi Railway in recent years include:

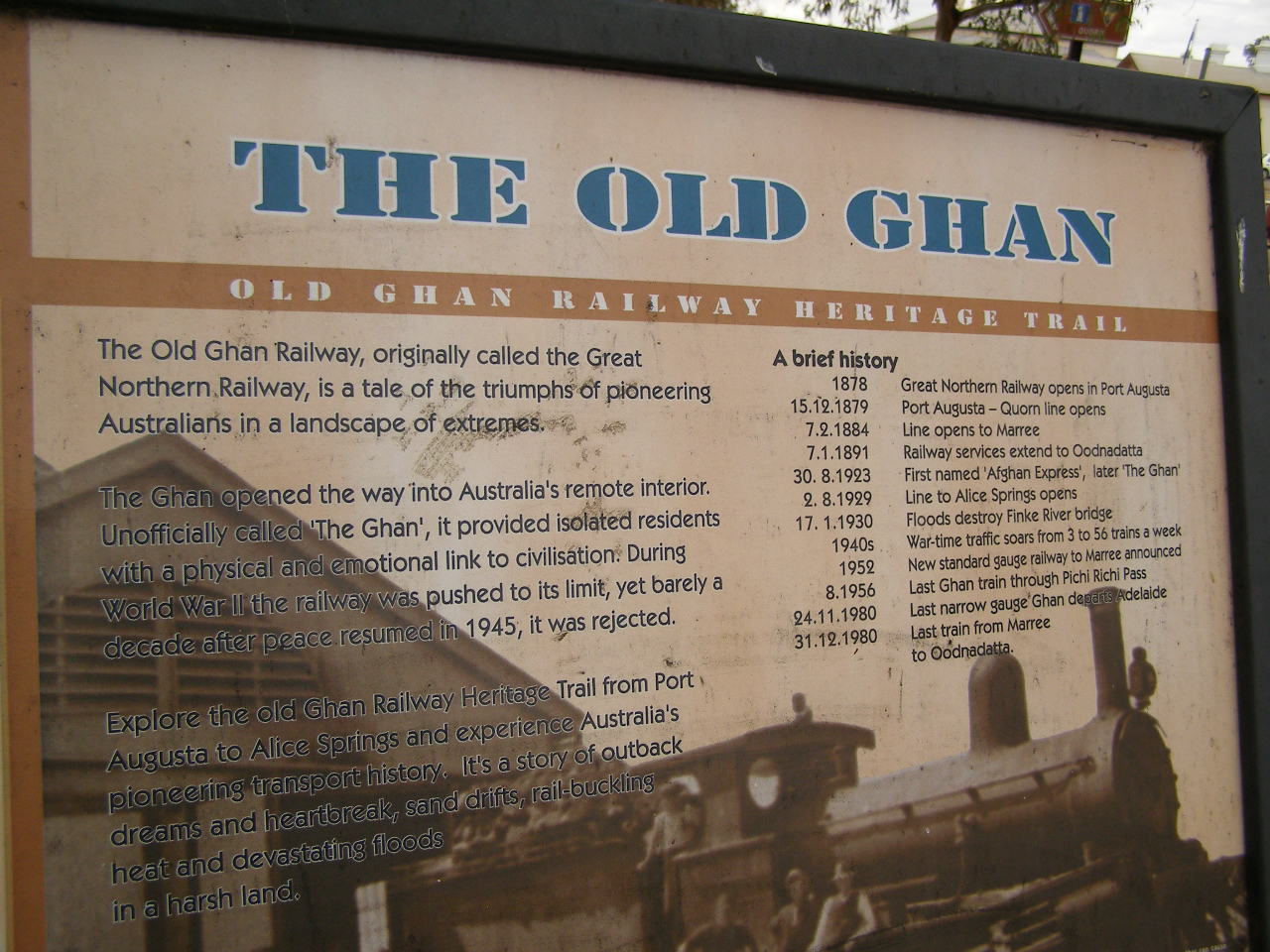
Sign about the Central Australia Railway at Quorn station

- overhaul and return to service of WAGR steam locomotive W934
- overhaul and return to service of WAGR steam locomotive W916 (rebuilt as W22)
- rebuild of several original Commonwealth Railways narrow-gauge carriages, including:
  - NABPA class passenger carriage, numbers 25, 26 and 27
  - NIA class passenger carriage number 36 – distinguished as the vehicle that in World War II carried United States General Douglas MacArthur, his wife, son and amah from Alice Springs to Adelaide via Quorn after they had escaped the Japanese advance of the Philippines (it was at Terowie that MacArthur made his famous declaration, "I came through and I shall return" from the end platform of the car)
  - NSS class special service observation carriage number 34, used by the Duke of Gloucester on a royal train during his 1934 visit to Australia
  - NYAB class composite brake van carriage number 15
- restoration of SAR Brill railcar trailer 305
- restoration and return to service of motor inspection car MIC 126, a 1937 Morris 25 Morris motor vehicle that runs on railway wheels
- restoration of SAR refreshment carriage Light
- rebuild of SAR passenger carriage number 5
- tyre replacement and crank journal machining of loco W934
- cylinder profiling and new pistons NM25
- reroofing of the Quorn Railway Station building
- New Point Of Sale system installed at Woolshed Flat

Ongoing projects:

- rebuild of SAR steam locomotive Yx141
- acquisition and restoration of former SAR 830 class locomotives 843 & 846
- tyre repairs and bogie overhaul NT76
- rebuild of SAR Long Tom passenger carriage number 470.
- restoration of the Quorn Goods Shed, located in the railway station precinct.
- isolation of field excitation fault in locomotive NSU52
- track maintenance with replacement of approximately 2,000 timber sleepers per year

Future projects:

- tyre replacement on W22 (W916)
- restoration of SAR locomotive T186 to working order
- repair of spare boiler for T186
- construction of new W class tender tank

== Rolling stock ==
=== Motive power ===
As of October 2026, the society's operational motive power was four steam locomotives, three diesel locomotives, a diesel railcar and a steam motor coach, among a total fleet as follows:

Number	Class	Year built	Wheel arrangement	Condition	Comments	Gauge	Image
W916	WAGR W class	1951	4-8-2	Operational	Rebuilt as W22 / Purchased in 1975	NG	W22 at Quorn
W931	WAGR W class	1951	4-8-2	Stored / source of spare parts	Purchased in 1980 for spare parts	NG	
W933	WAGR W class	1951	4-8-2	Stored	Purchased in 1974 and piggybacked a train to Pt Augusta	NG	W933 at Quorn
W934	WAGR W class	1951	4-8-2	Operational	Purchased in 1974 and piggybacked a train to Pt Augusta	NG	W934 at Quorn
W22	ST W class	1951	4-8-2	Stored / source of spare parts	ex Silverton Tramway / acquired in 1999	NG	
T186	SAR T class	1909	4-8-0	Under restoration	Purchased in 1976	NG	T186 at Quorn
Yx141	SAR Yx class	1892	2-6-0	Overhaul	Purchased in 1983	NG	Yx141 at Quorn
Z199	SAR Z class	Under construction	4-4-0	Under construction	Privately owned new build replica. Frame and tender at Quorn, boiler under construction	NG	
Wx18	SAR Wx class	1879	2-6-0	Stored	Disassembled / Purchased in 1985	NG	
BHP 3		1890	2-6-2T	Stored	Tank locomotive / Purchased in 1983	NG	
Passchendaele	BHP	1919	0-6-0T	Stored	Purchased in 2019	NG	Passchendaele at Quorn
NM25	CR NM class	1925	4-8-0	Operational	Purchased in 1990	NG	NM25 at Quorn
NB30	CR NB class	1916 / rebuilt 1958	C	Operational	Diesel hydraulic locomotive, used for shunting and occasional maintenance train duties.	NG	NB30 at Quorn
NSU51	CR NSU class	1954	A1A-A1A	Stored / source of spare parts	Purchased 1980	NG	
NSU52	CR NSU class	1954	A1A-A1A	Operational	Purchased 1982	NG	NSU52 at Quorn
NSU54	CR NSU class	1954	A1A-A1A	Stored / source of spare parts	Purchased 1983 for spare parts	NG	
NT76	CR NT class	1968	Co-Co	Operational	Used for shunting, train operations and occasional maintenance train duties. Purchased in 1989	NG	NT76 at Quorn
843	SAR 830 class	1962	Co-Co	Under restoration	Donated in 2021 by One Rail Australia	NG	843 at Quorn
846	SAR 830 class	1963	Co-Co	Stored	Spare parts for 843. Ex AN Tasrail, donated by One Rail Australia in 2021	NG	846 at Quorn
873	SAR 830 class	1966	Co-Co	Under restoration	Donated by Aurizon in April 2026. Previously only ever operated on the Port Lincoln Division	NG	
DE10	DE	1928	Bo-Bo	Stored	Was petrol powered then converted to diesel / Purchased 1984	NG was SG	
SMC 1	SMC	1906	2-2-0WT	Operational	Steam Motor Coach No.1 "Coffee Pot" / Purchased in 1984	NG	SMC 1 at Quorn
106	SAR 75 class	1928	-	Operational	Diesel railcar / Purchased in 1977	NG	RC 106 at Quorn
Table updated by NR17 Photography

=== Carriages ===
Restored carriages were as follows:

Class	Number	Former Operator	Description	Comments
	5	SAR	Short Tom (157 type)	Contains markings of World War 2 soldier names
	74	SAR	Short Tom (American type)	
	90	SAR	Short Tom (American type)	
	167	SAR	Short Tom (157 type)	Commissioner's carriage named "Flinders" by SAR 1929 or 1930
	169	SAR	Short Tom (157 type)	Officers' sleeping carriage named "Sturt" by SAR 1929 or 1930
	170	SAR	Short Tom (157 type)	Officers' kitchen and dining carriage named "Light" by SAR 1929 or 1930
	175	SAR	Short Tom (157 type)	Officers' sleeping carriage named "Lincoln" by SAR 1929 or 1930
	207	SAR	Long Tom	
	209	SAR	Long Tom	Named "Wandana" by PRRPS after rebuild, guards unit.
	305	SAR	Brill Model 75 railcar trailer	Formerly numbered 219 on broad gauge, numbered 305 by PRRPS
	4891	SAR	Composite bogie brake van	
	4894	SAR	Composite bogie brake van	Power brake van
	Alberga	SAR	Broken Hill Express carriage	Sleeping carriage
	Coonatto	SAR	Broken Hill Express carriage	Sleeping carriage
	Nilpena	SAR	Broken Hill Express carriage	Sleeping carriage
NYAB	15	CR	Composite brake van	Rebuilt by PRRPS in a different layout from the original
NABPa	25	CR	Composite sitting	
NABPa	26	CR	Composite sitting	
NABPa	27	CR	Composite sitting	
NSS	34	CR	Special Service Car No. 3	First-class sleeping, dining and observation carriage; used for special hires
NIA	36	CR	Composite first-class sleeping	Includes kitchen and dining area

== Awards ==
Pichi Richi Railway has received many significant awards, including the following:

Year	Award
1984	South Australian Association of Regional Tourist Organisations Inc, Harry Dowling Award for Tourism Excellence
1984	Flinders Ranges Regional Tourist Association Inc, Tourism Award Winner for the Most Significant Tourism Enterprise
1987	State Bank South Australian Tourism Awards, Tourist Attractions category
1987	Flinders Ranges Regional Tourist Association Inc, Tourism Award Winner for the Most Significant Tourist Enterprise
1992	State Bank South Australian Tourism Awards, Judges' Commendation - Significant Local Attractions category
1997	Yellow Pages South Australian Tourism Awards, Award of Distinction - Heritage and Cultural Tourism category
2002	Permanent Way Institution SA Section, Trackwork Achievement Award
2014	South Australian Regional Awards, StatewideSuper Tourism Award
2019	Nominated Finalist in South Australian Tourism Awards
2021	Winner of the Tourist Attraction category in the South Australian Tourism Awards
2023	Awarded the SA Premier's Certificate of Recognition for outstanding volunteering service
2023	Nominated as finalist in South Australian Tourism Awards

== Visiting operators ==
PRRPS has hosted vehicles of other heritage railway operators.

The first occasion, in October 1981, was when the Steamtown Peterborough Railway Preservation Society ran a train to Quorn. Although the Quorn station yard and line to Peterborough was still under the control of Australian National at this time, the Steamtown trip became the last steam-hauled train and last passenger train to travel the entire Peterborough–Quorn railway line. Steamtown's ex-WAGR Pmr720 was the only Pacific type steam locomotive to ever visit Quorn.

The Australian Society of Section Car Operators negotiated an access agreement with PRRPS and subsequently its members used the railway between Quorn and Stirling North to operate their section cars on the weekend of 22 and 23 March 2003.

Former BHAS locomotive "Peronne" and Short Tom carriage 144 from the National Railway Museum have operated on Pichi Richi Railway.
