= WAGR W class =

Class of Australian 4-8-2 locomotives

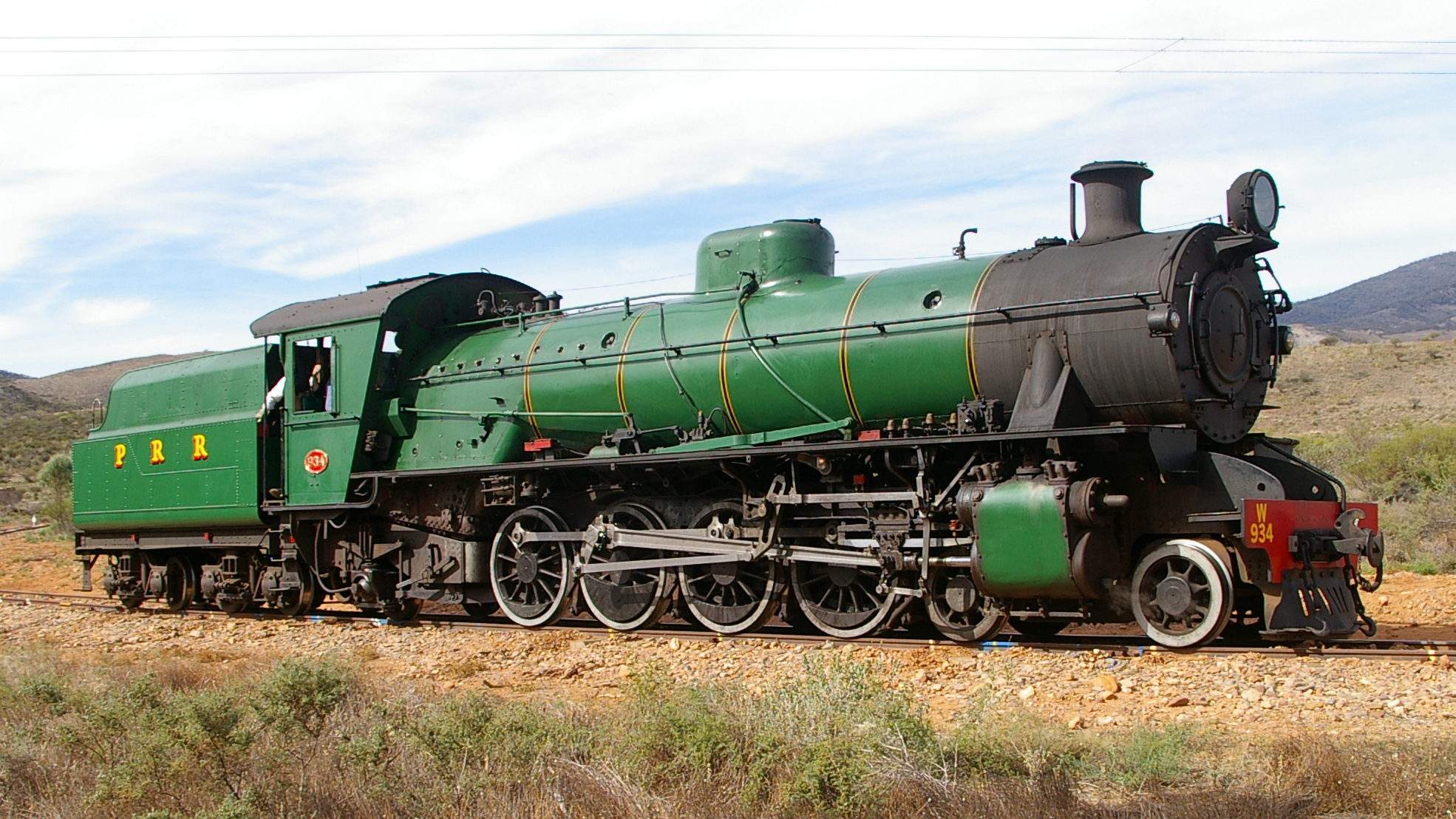
- W934 on the Pichi Richi Railway in April 2012
Type and origin
- Power type: Steam
- Designer: Frederick Mills, Charles Clarke & Beyer, Peacock & Co
- Builder: Beyer, Peacock & Co
- Serial number: 7378-7417, 7453-7472
- Build date: 1951–1952
- Total produced: 60
Specifications
- Configuration
  - Whyte: 4-8-2
- Gauge: 3 ft 6 in (1,067 mm)
- Leading dia.: 2 ft 6 in (762 mm)
- Driver dia.: 4 ft 0 in (1,219 mm)
- Trailing dia.: 2 ft 6 in (762 mm)
- Length: 61 ft 10.9 in (18.87 m)
- Width: 8 ft 2 in (2.49 m)
- Height: 12 ft 4.4 in (3.77 m)
- Axle load: 9 long tons 15 cwt (21,800 lb or 9.9 t)
- Loco weight: 97 long tons 10 cwt (218,400 lb or 99.1 t)
- Fuel type: Coal
- Fuel capacity: 5 long tons 0 cwt (11,200 lb or 5.1 t)
- Water cap.: W901-W940: 3,000 imp gal (14,000 L; 3,600 US gal); W941-W960: 3,620 imp gal (16,500 L; 4,350 US gal)
- Boiler pressure: 200 lbf/in^{2} (1.38 MPa)
- Superheater: 22-element Melesco
- Cylinders: 2
- Cylinder size: 16 in × 24 in (406 mm × 610 mm)
- Valve gear: Walschaerts
- Valve type: 8.5-inch (220 mm) piston valve
- Loco brake: Vacuum
- Train brakes: Vacuum Brakes
Performance figures
- Maximum speed: 80 km/h (50 mph)
- Tractive effort: 21,760 lbf (96.79 kN)
- Factor of adh.: 4
Career
- Operators: Western Australian Government Railways
- Number in class: 60
- Numbers: W901-W960
- Disposition: 15 preserved, 45 scrapped

The WAGR W class is a class of 4-8-2 steam locomotives operated by the Western Australian Government Railways (WAGR) between 1951 and 1972.

== Engineering Background ==
The class was first proposed by Chief Mechanical Engineer Frederick Mills in 1947. However, the death of Mills in 1949 put a hold on the project, with his successor Charles Clarke, taking up the project on his appointment later that year.

Mills had requested Beyer, Peacock & Co to reserve capacity for their construction when the design was first proposed, however, by the time Clarke took over, Beyer, Peacock & Co had identified a number of possible problems with the design. This led to a meeting in the United Kingdom in 1950, the outcome of which was a substantial redesign of the locomotive.

The resultant locomotive included many proprietary boiler and ancillary fittings, as well as parts interchange ability. The firebox was substantially altered to take into account the properties of Collie coal. This included a combustion chamber, thermic syphons and arch bar tubes.

The running gear was based heavily on Beyer, Peacock & Co's Standard Light Garratt, which was built for the South Australian Railways as its 400 class. The first 40 were delivered partially erected, whilst the final 20 were fully assembled prior to shipping. The last 20 had larger tenders, capable of holding an additional 2,500 litres (550 imp gal; 660 US gal). All were delivered between April 1951 and June 1952.

== Operational history ==
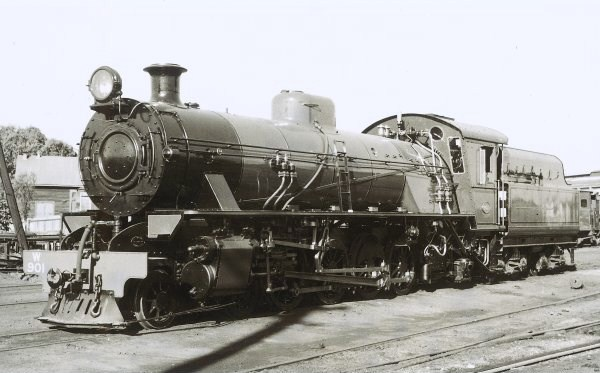
W901 at East Perth Locomotive Depot in 1951

The light axle load of the W class, 9.5t, gave it availability across the entire WAGR Network. Although essentially a freight engine, the W class regularly hauled The Australind from Perth to Bunbury. It effectively replaced the aged O and G classes still working on lighter parts of the network.

The class had a reputation for being free steamers and strong pullers. Although they have a well-deserved reputation for their reliability, like any new class the W locos suffered some minor teething problems, including ashpan failures, and leaks in and around the foundation ring. The leaks were traced to faulty welding. The class suffered from stay failures in its early days, particularly in and around the throat plate. The first to fail was W913 in 1952. At one point, no fewer than 34 of the class were in Midland Railway Workshops or regional depots for stay repair. The problem was traced back to the thermic syphons creating significant water movement in the area, overstressing the boiler plates, as well as problems with the quality of the original stays. The syphons were progressively removed over a seven-year period, eliminating the problem.

Following the modification, the last of which was made in 1959, the class gave excellent service. As dieselisation of WAGR continued, the class was gradually moved to the southern parts of the network. Withdrawals commenced in 1968 with the last condemned in 1972. Most of the class was scrapped in 1971, although 19 were held in reserve at Midland Railway Workshops until 1972. The last few remained at Midland until 1980.

== Sister Locomotives ==
Beyer, Peacock & Co built four additional engines to the same design for the Silverton Tramway Company, designated as its W class.

== Preservation ==
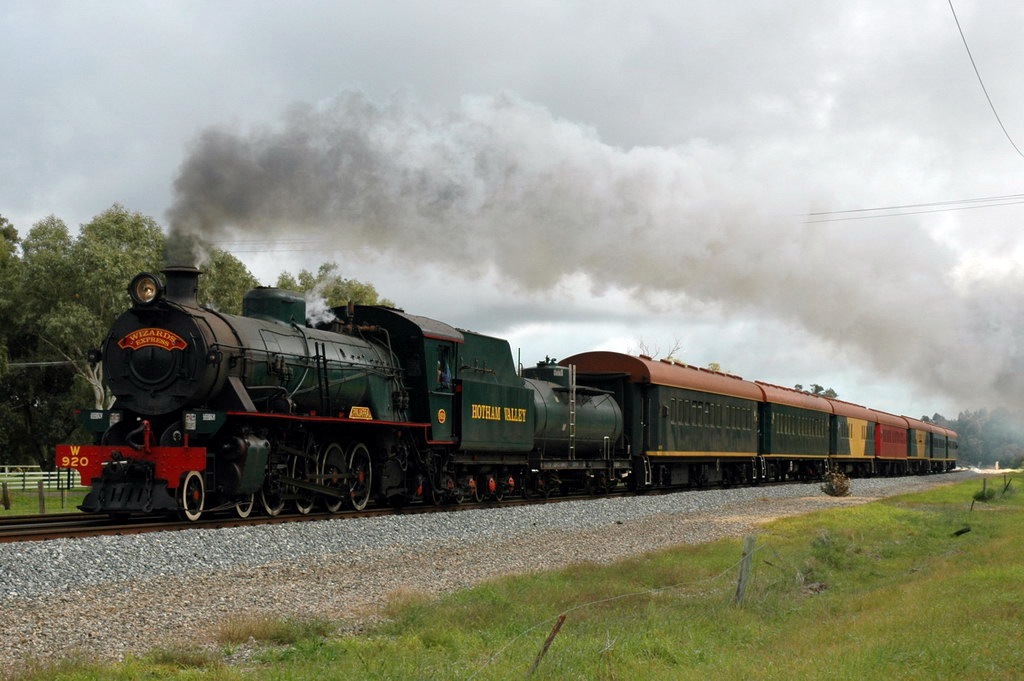
W920 on the Hotham Valley Railway in July 2005

The light axle load of the W class along with their relative youth resulted in them being sought after by tourist operators, both in Western Australia and interstate with 15 preserved. Today they form the backbone of the Hotham Valley Railway and Pichi Richi Railway fleets with each having three operational examples. Until 2006, Hotham Valley Railway's Ws operated services on the Brookfield Rail network, but today they are confined to its own heritage line.

== List of preserved locomotives ==
- W901: to Steamtown, Peterborough SA 1979, recommissioned 1985. Boiler condition unknown as stored wet. Currently on static display.
- W903: to Hotham Valley Railway 1977, Stored out of service; Pending overhaul
- W907: to Steamtown, Peterborough SA 1979, never recommissioned, plinthed early 2013 (missing major components) painted a bright green and repainted into dark green.
- W908: to Hotham Valley Railway 1979, restored to operation in 1988, currently in long-term storage out of service
- W916: to Pichi Richi Railway 1974, restored 2003 as Silverton Tramway Company W22, operational
- W919: to Esperance Bay Historical Society 1974, static display
- W920: to Hotham Valley Railway 1976, named Sir Ross McLarty then Pinjarra, Stored out of service at Dwellingup, undergoing overhaul for return to service in 2027.
- W924: to Great Southern Steam, Albany 1978, but operated on only a few occasions. Sold to the Ghan Preservation Society and shipped to Alice Springs 1984, recommissioned 1987, currently on static display.
- W931: to Pichi Richi Railway 1980, stored
- W933: to Pichi Richi Railway 1974, formerly operational, now stored
- W934: to Pichi Richi Railway 1974, mechanical overhaul completed in early 2019, currently operational.
- W943: static display at Collie Museum
- W945: to Hotham Valley Railway 1977, named Banksiadale, operational as of July 2018.
- W947: to Great Southern Steam, Albany 1973. Hauled last Albany Progress from Albany to Elleker in December 1978. Sold to Western Australian Rail Transport Museum 1984, sold to Hotham Valley Railway 2011 and moved to Pinjarra in November 2013 with boiler removed for long term overhaul
- W953: to Western Australian Rail Transport Museum 1972, on static display

== See also ==
- Rail transport in Western Australia
- List of Western Australian locomotive classes
