= S-class destroyer =

S-class destroyer may refer to:

- S-class destroyer (1917), a class of 67 destroyers ordered in 1917 and launched between 1918 and 1920
- S and T-class destroyer, a class of 16 destroyers, launched in 1942 and 1943
