= WAGR S class (1888) =

Class of Australian 0-6-0WT locomotives

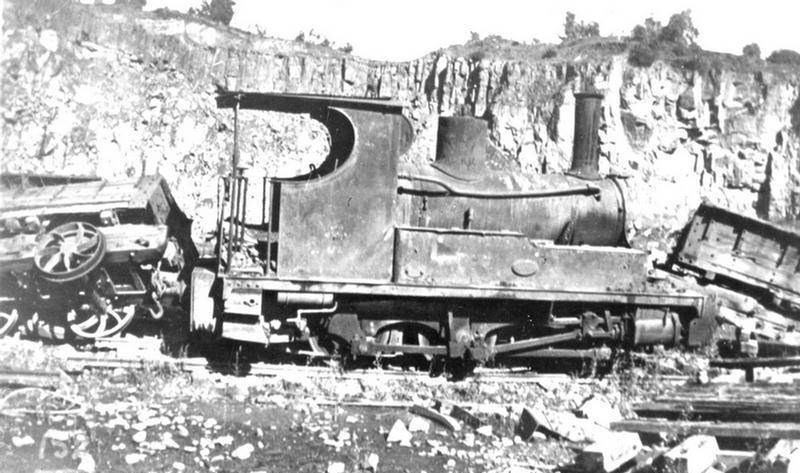
- S162 at Prospect Quarry in the 1930s
Type and origin
- Power type: Steam
- Builder: Kitson & Co
- Serial number: T231, T260
- Build date: 1888, 1892
- Total produced: 2
Specifications
- Configuration
  - Whyte: 0-6-0WT
- Gauge: 3 ft 6 in (1,067 mm)
- Length: 20 ft 0 in (6.10 m)
- Loco weight: 17 long tons 0 cwt (38,100 lb or 17.3 t)
- Fuel type: Coal
- Fuel capacity: 0.5 long tons 0 cwt (1,100 lb or 0.5 t)
- Water cap.: 350 imp gal (1,600 L; 420 US gal)
- Firebox
  - Grate area: 7.3 sq ft (0.68 m^{2})
- Boiler pressure: 120 psi (827 kPa)
Performance figures
- Tractive effort: 5,365 lbf (23.86 kN)
- Factor of adh.: 7.1
Career
- Operators: Great Southern Railway; Western Australian Government Railways
- Disposition: 2 scrapped

The WAGR S class was a two-member class of 0-6-0WT tank locomotives operated by the Great Southern Railway (GSR) and later Western Australian Government Railways (WAGR).

== History ==
In August 1888, a Kitson & Co, Leeds built a 0-6-0WT locomotive named Princess entered service on the GSR for use in Albany, it was joined by a second named Duchess on 1 May 1892. Both were included in the December 1896 takeover of the GSR by the WAGR and became the S class, numbered S162 and S163. They were withdrawn in 1915 and 1916 respectively, and later sold to the Commonwealth Government, operating construction trains at the Henderson Naval Base before moving to Canberra in 1923 during the construction of Parliament House.

In 1927 both were sold to NSW Associated Blue Metal Quarries and numbered 1 and 2. The latter was scrapped in 1932 while the former having operated at Prospect Quarry, was scrapped at Bass Point Quarry, Shellharbour in 1938.

== Class list ==
The numbers, names and periods in service of each member of the class were as follows:

Builder's number	GSR in service	GSR name	WAGR number	WAGR withdrawn
T231	1 August 1888	Princess	162	18 November 1915
T260	1 May 1892	Duchess	163	6 January 1916

== Namesakes ==
The S class designation was reused when the S class locomotives were introduced in 1943. It was reused again in the 1990s when the Westrail S class diesel locomotives entered service.

== See also ==
- History of rail transport in Western Australia
- List of Western Australian locomotive classes
