= Commonwealth Railways NM class =

Class of diesel locomotives

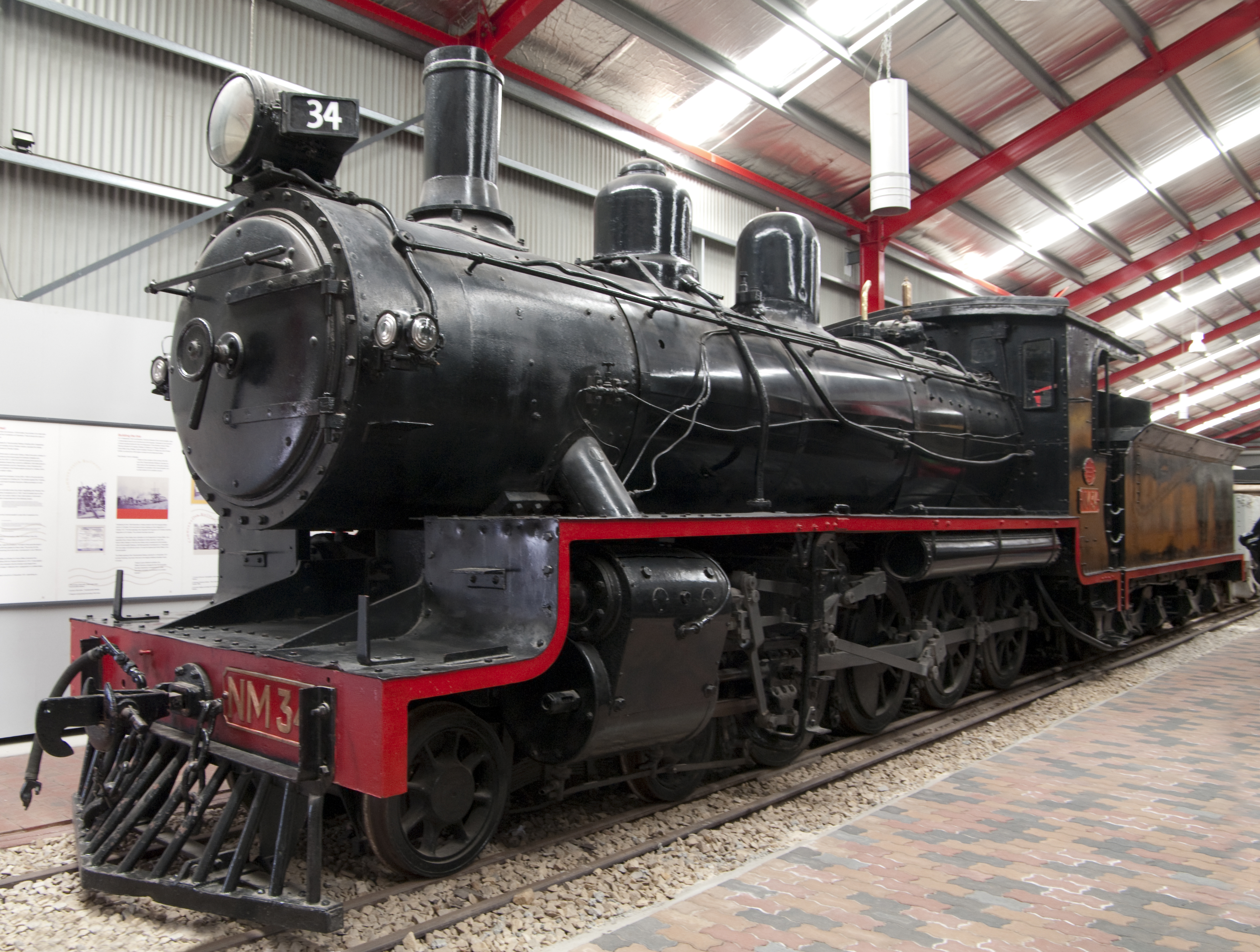
- Preserved NM34 at the National Railway Museum, Port Adelaide in 2010
Type and origin
- Power type: Steam
- Builder: Thompson & Co, Castlemaine, Victoria
- Build date: 1925-1927
- Total produced: 22
Specifications
- Configuration
  - Whyte: 4-8-0
- Gauge: 1067 mm (3 ft 6 in)
- Fuel type: Coal
- Firebox
  - Grate area: 18.5 sq ft (1.72 m^{2})
- Boiler pressure: 160 psi (11 bar; 1,100 kPa)
- Cylinder size: 17 in × 22 in (432 mm × 559 mm)
Performance figures
- Tractive effort: 18,085 lbf (80.45 kN)
Career
- Operators: Commonwealth Railways
- Numbers: NM15-NM28; NM31-NM38
- First run: June 1925
- Preserved: NM25, NM34
- Current owner: National Railway Museum; Pichi Richi Railway
- Disposition: 2 preserved, 20 scrapped

The Commonwealth Railways NM class is a class of 4-8-0 locomotives owned by the Commonwealth Railways, Australia. The class operated on 1067 mm (3 ft 6 in) narrow gauge lines in South Australia and the Northern Territory.

== History ==
Between June 1925 and December 1927, the Commonwealth Railways took delivery of 22 locomotives built by Thompson & Co, Castlemaine, Victoria for use on the Central Australia Railway. Their design was the same as the Queensland Railways C17 class, but with larger tenders and vacuum brakes rather than air brakes.

The final locomotive, dispatched to the North Australia Railway, was moved to the Central Australia Railway in 1941.

Eighteen were converted to burn oil during the 1949 Australian coal strike and were converted back to coal burning after the strike ended. All were withdrawn between 1954 and 1956 as NSU class diesel-electric locomotives entered service.

== Preservation ==
Two have been preserved: NM25 in operational condition at the Pichi Richi Railway and NM34 on static display at the National Railway Museum, Port Adelaide.

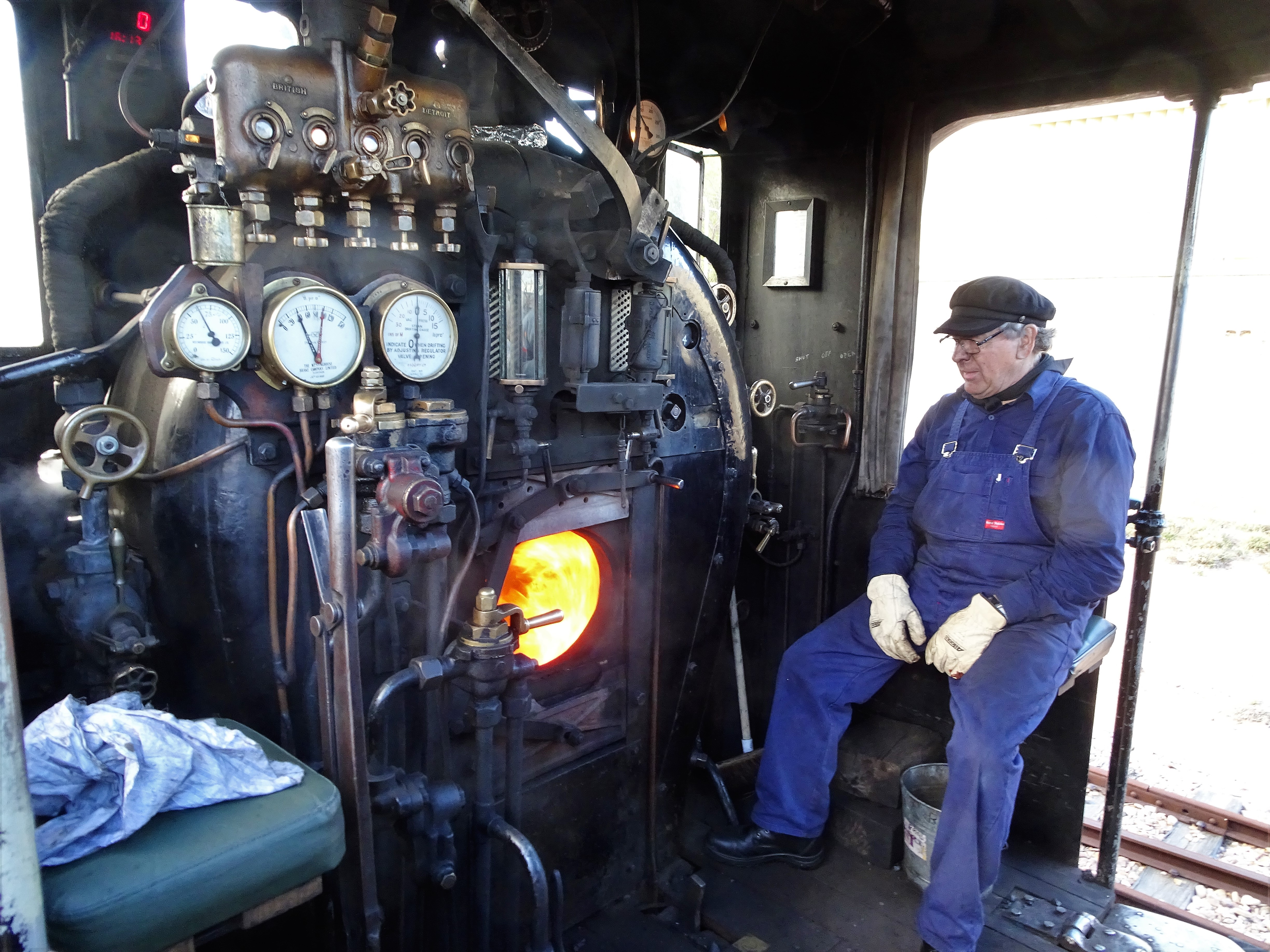
NM class locomotive no. 25, operated by the Pichi Richi Railway
