= Australian Standard Garratt =

Australian Garratt locomotive class

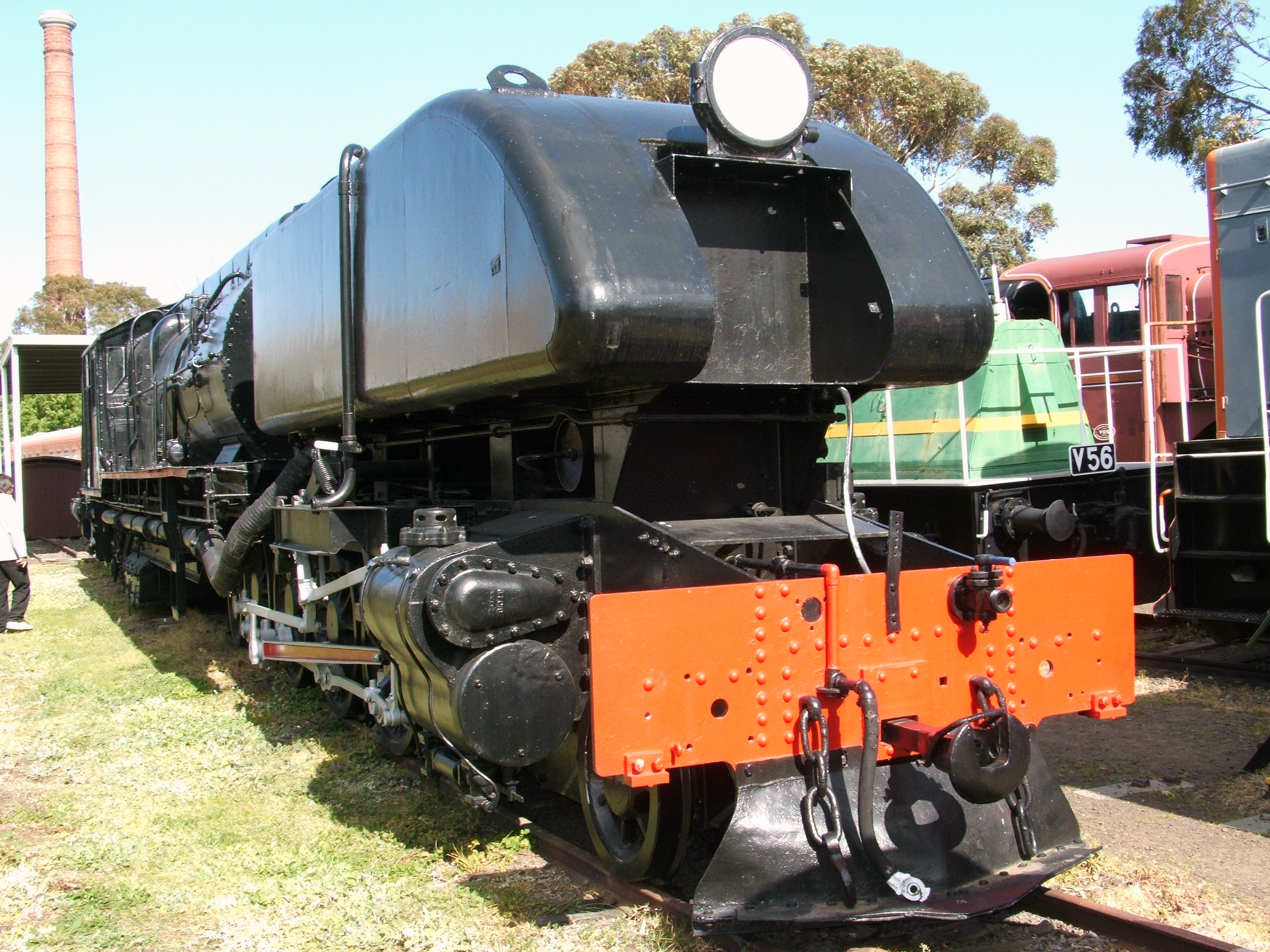
- G33, formerly of the Fyansford Cement Works Railway, at the Newport Railway Museum, Victoria, in 2007; it moved to the Bellarine Railway in 2013
Type and origin
- Power type: Steam
- Builder: Clyde Engineering; Islington Railway Workshops; Midland Railway Workshops; Newport Workshops
- Build date: 1943–1945
- Total produced: 57
Specifications
- Configuration
  - Whyte: 4-8-2+2-8-4
  - UIC: 2′D1′+1′D2′
- Gauge: 1067 mm (3 ft 6 in)
- Driver dia.: 48 in (1219 mm)
- Length: 85 ft 9 1/2 in (26.15 m)
- Axle load: 8.5 long tons (8.6 t; 9.5 short tons)
- Adhesive weight: 76.25 long tons (77.5 t; 85.4 short tons)
- Loco weight: 119 long tons (120.9 t; 133.3 short tons)
- Fuel type: Coal
- Fuel capacity: 6 long tons (6.1 t; 6.7 short tons)
- Water cap.: 4,200 imp gal (19,094 L; 5,044 US gal)
- Firebox
  - Grate area: 35 sq ft (3 m^{2})
- Boiler pressure: 200 psi (1379 kPa)
- Heating surface
  - Firebox: 163 sq ft (15 m^{2})
  - Tubes: 1535 sq ft (143 m^{2})
  - Total surface: 2,013 sq ft (187 m^{2})
- Superheater
  - Heating area: 315 sq ft (29 m^{2})
- Cylinders: 4 outside
- Cylinder size: 14.5 in × 24 in (368 mm × 610 mm)
Performance figures
- Tractive effort: 34,240 lbf (152.3 kN)
- Factor of adh.: 4.4
Career
- Operators: Emu Bay Railway; Fyansford Cement Works Railway; Queensland Railways; South Australian Railways; Tasmanian Government Railways; Western Australian Government Railways
- Preserved: G33
- Disposition: 1 preserved, 56 scrapped

The Australian Standard Garratt (ASG) is a Garratt articulated steam locomotive designed and built in Australia during World War II for use on the 1067 mm (3 ft 6 in) narrow-gauge railway systems owned by the Australian states of Queensland, South Australia, Tasmania and Western Australia. After the war, ASGs operated in South Australia and at the Fyansford Cement Works railway in Victoria.

== History ==
With the outbreak of World War II, in 1939 the federal government formed the Commonwealth Land Transport Board (CLTB) to take responsibility for the country's land transport networks. In the national interest it was empowered to over-ride decisions of the state railways. In 1942, the CLTB appointed the Commissioner of Railways in Western Australia, Joseph Ellis, to investigate the capacity of Australia's narrow gauge network and recommend what locomotives should be purchased. Ellis recommended that three variations of Garratt locomotive be purchased; heavy, medium and light.

The CLTB elected to build only the light type to allow it to operate on any narrow gauge line in Australia. After an attempt to obtain drawings and licences from Beyer, Peacock and Company failed, in July 1942 the CLTB recommended to the War Cabinet that 30 locomotives be built locally. In August 1942, the War Cabinet approved the order, which was increased to 65 locomotives in November 1942. The Western Australian Government Railways' Chief Mechanical Engineer Frederick Mills was seconded to lead a team of engineers in Melbourne to design the new locomotive. The Queensland Railways were vocal opponents, stating its preference for a modified version of its C17 class.

The result was the Australian Standard Garratt locomotive. The first was built in a record-breaking four months, entering service in September 1943. Only 57 ASGs were completed; assembly of the remaining eight was cancelled at the end of the war. The locomotives were built by the WAGR's Midland Railway Workshops (10), the Victorian Railways' Newport Workshops (12), the South Australian Railways' Islington Railway Workshops (13), and Clyde Engineering, Sydney (22).

== In service ==
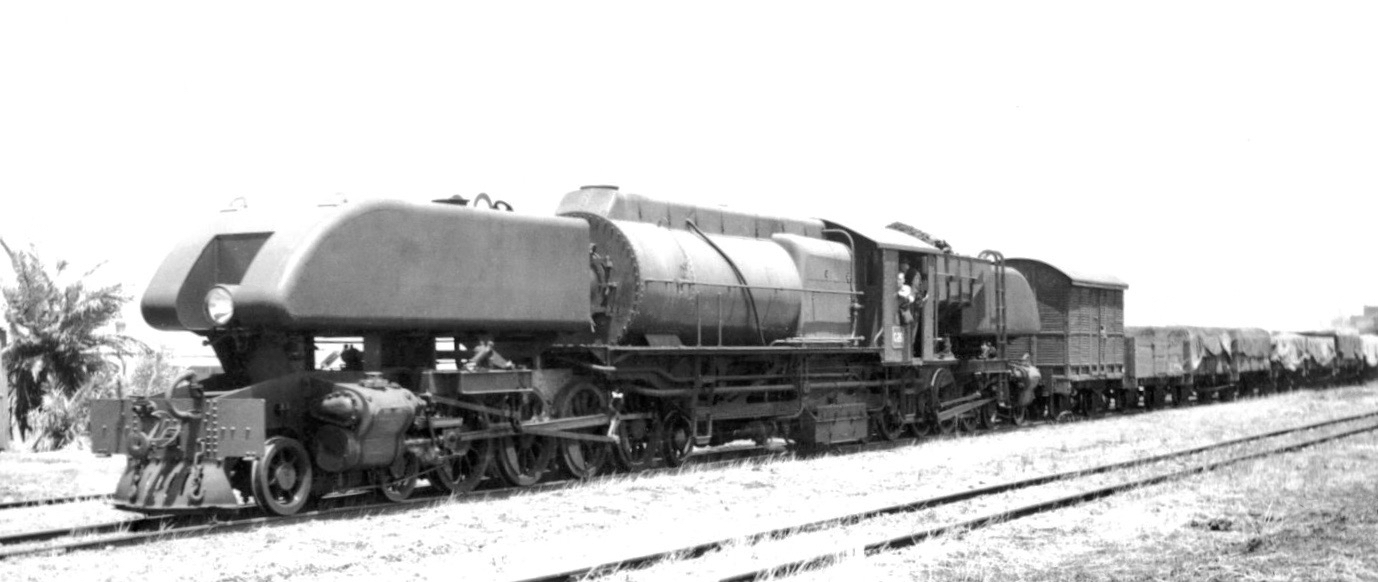
Western Australian Government Railways' G26 in 1943

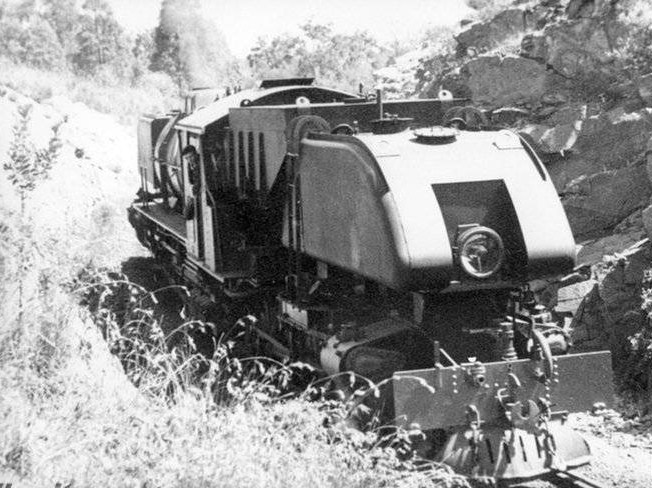
Western Australian Government Railways' G55 in 1952

Because of differences between the states, especially in regard to loading gauges, the sharpness of curves, and axle load, especially in Queensland, the design had to be a compromise, which went against the idea of having a standardised design.

To enable the long-wheelbase engine units to negotiate sharp curves, the 1st and 3rd driving wheels (Note: Counting from the leading end of each power bogie) were designed to be flangeless, but this proved to be a major flaw as it led to a tendency for the locomotives to derail on curves and points. Another key problem, which made the ASGs unpopular with locomotive crews, was that the firebox door opened flat on the floor of the driving cab, maximising heat radiation into the crew compartment. This resulted in them having fairly short lives with most withdrawn by the mid-1950s. Some were resold for use on the Emu Bay and Fyansford Cement Works Railways where they would have more successful careers.

=== Queensland Railways ===
The Queensland Railways purchased 23. One was never used and another saw only two months service. In September 1945, the drivers' union placed a ban on them. Attempts to modify them proved unsuccessful, and they were written off in 1948. Three were sold to the Emu Bay Railway and six to the Tasmanian Government Railways, with the remainder scrapped in 1954/55.

=== Tasmanian Government Railways ===
The Tasmanian Government Railways purchased 14 new and another six second-hand from the Queensland Railways. Two were sold to the Emu Bay Railway with the remainder scrapped in the late 1950s.

=== Western Australian Government Railways ===
The Western Australian Government Railways purchased 25. They were unpopular with crews, and their use through the state's only tunnel at Swan View caused serious problems, resulting in deaths, industrial disputes, and a Royal Commission.

Six of the WAGR locomotives were sold to the South Australian Railways in 1952. The last were withdrawn from the WAGR in January 1957.

=== Emu Bay Railway ===
The Emu Bay Railway purchased three second-hand from the Queensland Railways and two from the Tasmanian Government Railways. It would operate them successfully until the mid-1960s. One was destroyed in an accident in February 1962 with a replacement obtained from the TGR.

=== South Australian Railways ===
In 1952, the South Australian Railways purchased six second-hand from the WAGR to haul lead ore between Cockburn and Port Pirie as an interim solution pending the delivery of the 400 class Garratts, with all condemned by February 1956.

=== Fyansford Cement Works Railway ===
The Fyansford Cement Works Railway purchased G33 from Commonwealth Disposals in August 1945. It was withdrawn in 1957, but maintained in operational condition until the railway closed in 1966 when it was donated to the Geelong division of the Australian Railway Historical Society.

== Class list ==
Number	Builder	Builders number	Operator	Entered service	Withdrawn	Scrapped	Notes
G1	Newport Workshops		Queensland Railways	September 1943	September 1945	1955	
G2	Newport Workshops		Queensland Railways	November 1943	September 1945	1955	
G3	Newport Workshops		Queensland Railways	December 1943	September 1945	1955	
G4	Newport Workshops		Queensland Railways	December 1943	September 1945	1955	
G5	Newport Workshops		Queensland Railways	February 1944	September 1945	1955	
G6	Newport Workshops		Tasmanian Government Railways				
G7	Newport Workshops		Tasmanian Government Railways				
G8	Newport Workshops		Tasmanian Government Railways				
G9	Newport Workshops		Tasmanian Government Railways				Delivered to Queensland Railways but did not enter service, sold to Tasmanian Government Railways in December 1948
G10	Newport Workshops		Western Australian Government Railways	3 April 1945	14 February 1952		
G11	Islington Railway Workshops		Queensland Railways Tasmanian Government Railways	December 1943			Sold to Tasmanian Government Railways in June 1946
G12	Islington Railway Workshops		Queensland Railways Tasmanian Government Railways Emu Bay Railway	December 1943			Sold to Tasmanian Government Railways in February 1950, sold to Emu Bay Railway 1962 as 20a as replacement for G25
G13	Islington Railway Workshops		Queensland Railways	February 1944	September 1945	1955	
G14	Islington Railway Workshops		Queensland Railways	June 1944	September 1945	1955	
G15	Islington Railway Workshops		Queensland Railways	May 1944	September 1945	1955	
G16	Islington Railway Workshops		Queensland Railways Emu Bay Railway	August 1944	September 1945	1955	Sold to Emu Bay Railway, delivered July 1950, entered service July 1952 as 16
G17	Islington Railway Workshops		Queensland Railways Emu Bay Railway	August 1944	September 1945	1955	Sold to Emu Bay Railway, delivered March 1954, entered service October 1956 as 18
G18	Islington Railway Workshops		Queensland Railways Tasmanian Government Railways	July 1945	September 1945	1955	Sold to Tasmanian Government Railways in February 1950
G19	Islington Railway Workshops		Queensland Railways Tasmanian Government Railways	April 1945	September 1945	1955	Sold to Tasmanian Government Railways in December 1948
G20	Islington Railway Workshops		Western Australian Government Railways	23 March 1945	17 April 1956	August 1959	Converted to oil firing 29 March 1951
G21	Clyde Engineering		Queensland Railways	January 1944			
G22	Clyde Engineering		Queensland Railways	February 1944			
G23	Clyde Engineering		Queensland Railways Emu Bay Railway	June 1944			Sold to Emu Bay Railway, delivered September 1950, entered service September 1953 as 17
G24	Clyde Engineering		Queensland Railways	May 1944			
G25	Clyde Engineering		Queensland Railways Tasmanian Government Railways Emu Bay Railway	May 1944	February 1962		Sold to Tasmanian Government Railways in June 1946 as 20, resold to Emu Bay Railway destroyed in accident February 1962
G26	Midland Railway Workshops		Western Australian Government Railways South Australian Railways	22 November 1943	7 November 1951		Sold to South Australian Railways 1952 and renumbered 305
G27	Midland Railway Workshops		Western Australian Government Railways	16 December 1943	30 July 1953		
G28	Midland Railway Workshops		Western Australian Government Railways	8 February 1944	10 January 1957	August 1959	Converted to oil firing 6 February 1048, converted back to coal 19 December 1950
G29	Midland Railway Workshops		Western Australian Government Railways South Australian Railways	10 March 1944	6 February 1951		Sold to South Australian Railways 1952 and renumbered 302
G30	Midland Railway Workshops		Western Australian Government Railways South Australian Railways	5 April 1944	7 November 1951		Sold to South Australian Railways 1952 and renumbered 304
G31	Newport Workshops		Western Australian Government Railways South Australian Railways	2 March 1945	6 February 1951		Converted to oil firing 13 February 1948, sold to South Australian Railways 1952 and renumbered 303
G32	Newport Workshops		Western Australian Government Railways South Australian Railways	1 June 1945	31 October 1951		Converted to oil firing 5 March 1948, converted back to coal, sold to South Australian Railways 1952 and renumbered 300
G33	Islington Railway Workshops		Fyansford Cement Works Railway	1946	1957		Donated to Australian Railway Historical Society Museum in 1966, transferred to Bellarine Railway in 2013
G34	Not assembled						
G35	Not assembled						
G36	Not assembled						
G37	Clyde Engineering		Tasmanian Government Railways				
G38	Clyde Engineering		Tasmanian Government Railways				
G39	Not assembled						
G40	Not assembled						
G41	Not assembled						
G42	Not assembled						
G43	Not assembled						
G44	Islington Railway Workshops		Western Australian Government Railways	8 March 1945	17 April 1956	July 1959	Converted to oil firing 17 February 1948, converted back to coal 18 April 1952
G45	Islington Railway Workshops		Western Australian Government Railways	23 April 1945	17 April 1956	July 1959	
G46	Midland Railway Workshops		Western Australian Government Railways	14 July 1944	10 January 1957	August 1959	Converted to oil firing 29 May 1951
G47	Midland Railway Workshops		Western Australian Government Railways	18 August 1944	10 January 1957	1964	Converted to oil firing 6 July 1951
G48	Midland Railway Workshops		Western Australian Government Railways	22 September 1944	6 February 1951		
G49	Midland Railway Workshops		Western Australian Government Railways South Australian Railways	20 October 1944	14 November 1951		Sold to South Australian Railways 1952 and renumbered 301
G50	Midland Railway Workshops		Western Australian Government Railways	8 December 1944	14 February 1952		
G51	Clyde Engineering		Queensland Railways	July 1944		1955	
G52	Clyde Engineering		Queensland Railways	August 1944		1955	
G53	Clyde Engineering		Queensland Railways	September 1944		1955	
G54	Clyde Engineering	480	Western Australian Government Railways	9 June 1945	14 February 1952		
G55	Clyde Engineering	481	Western Australian Government Railways	31 May 1945	10 January 1957	August 1959	Converted to oil firing 13 February 1952
G56	Clyde Engineering	482	Western Australian Government Railways	11 May 1945	10 January 1957	August 1959	
G57	Clyde Engineering	483	Western Australian Government Railways	24 April 1945	10 January 1957	July 1959	
G58	Clyde Engineering	484	Western Australian Government Railways	21 March 1945	6 February 1951		
G59	Clyde Engineering	485	Western Australian Government Railways	9 April 1945	10 January 1957	1964	
G60	Clyde Engineering		Tasmanian Government Railways				
G61	Clyde Engineering		Tasmanian Government Railways				
G62	Clyde Engineering		Tasmanian Government Railways				
G63	Clyde Engineering	489	Western Australian Government Railways	16 June 1945	14 February 1952		
G64	Clyde Engineering	490	Western Australian Government Railways	14 July 1945	6 February 1951		Converted to oil firing 15 March 1948
G65	Clyde Engineering	491	Western Australian Government Railways	4 August 1945	10 January 1957	1961	

== Preservation ==
The only surviving complete ASG is G33, which ran on the Fyansford Cement Works Railway until 1957. It was on static display at the Australian Railway Historical Society Museum in North Williamstown until 2013, when it was moved by road (together with a spare boiler) to the Bellarine Railway, Queenscliff, with the aim of full restoration.

Many front water tanks of ASGs have survived: one at Yatina, South Australia, two on a farm south of Peterborough, South Australia, one at the Workshops Rail Museum in Queensland, two at the Don River Railway in Tasmania, and several dotted around that state. They were used as water tanks for steam and fire-fighting until the early 1980s. Another also survives with the Launceston & North East Railway in Launceston, Tasmania. It was used as a waste oil tank by TasRail until the closure of the Hobart railway yard in 2014, possibly being the last steam engine component used by TasRail.

== Bibliography ==
- Barry, Kevin (December 1996), "Labour divided: the Garratt strike of 1946", Papers in Labour History (17): 46–67, ISSN 1030-6218
- Butrims, Robert; Australian Railway Historical Society. Victorian Division; Geelong Steam Preservation Society (1975), Australia's Garratt, Geelong Steam Preservation Society in conjunction with Australian Railway Historical Society, Victorian Division, ISBN 978-0-9598322-0-4
- Durrant, A E (1978). Australian Steam. Newton Abbot, Devon, UK; North Pomfret, Vt, USA: David & Charles. pp. 73–79. ISBN 0715376055.
- Durrant, A E (1981). Garratt Locomotives of the World (rev. and enl. ed.). Newton Abbot, England: David & Charles. ISBN 0-7153-7641-1. OCLC 9326294.
- Gunzburg, Adrian (1968). WAGR Locomotives 1940–1968. Perth: Australian Railway Historical Society (Western Australian Division). pp. 10–12, 47. OCLC 219836193.
