= K class =

K class or Class K may refer to:

== Railways ==
- Commonwealth Railways K class, Australia
- LB&SCR K class (1913), England
- SECR K and SR K1 classes (1914), England
- Metropolitan Railway K Class, England
- NBR K Class, Scotland
- NZR K class (1877), New Zealand
- NZR K class (1932), New Zealand
- South Australian Railways K class (broad gauge), South Australia
- South Australian Railways K class (narrow gauge), South Australia
- Tasmanian Government Railways K class, Tasmania
- Victorian Railways K class, Australia
- WAGR K class, steam, Western Australia
- WAGR K class (1891), steam, Western Australia
- WAGR K class (diesel), Western Australia
- K-class Melbourne tram
- K-class Sydney tram

== Ships ==
- K-class destroyer, British warships of World War II
- German K class cruiser, German warships of World War II
- K-class sloop, Dutch warships
- K-class submarine (disambiguation), several classes of warships
- British Columbia K-class ferry, Canadian ships
- Sydney K-class ferry, Sydney Harbour ferries
- K-class torpedo boat, Dutch warships

== Other uses ==
- K-class blimp, blimps built for the US Navy
- Class K, a classification for stars
- Energy class, an earthquake magnitude scale
