= Western Australian Government Railways K class =

Western Australian Government Railway K class may refer to one of the following locomotives:

- WAGR K class (1891)
- WAGR K class
- WAGR K class (diesel)
