= WAGR RA class =

Australian diesel electric locomotives

Western Australian Government Railways RA class
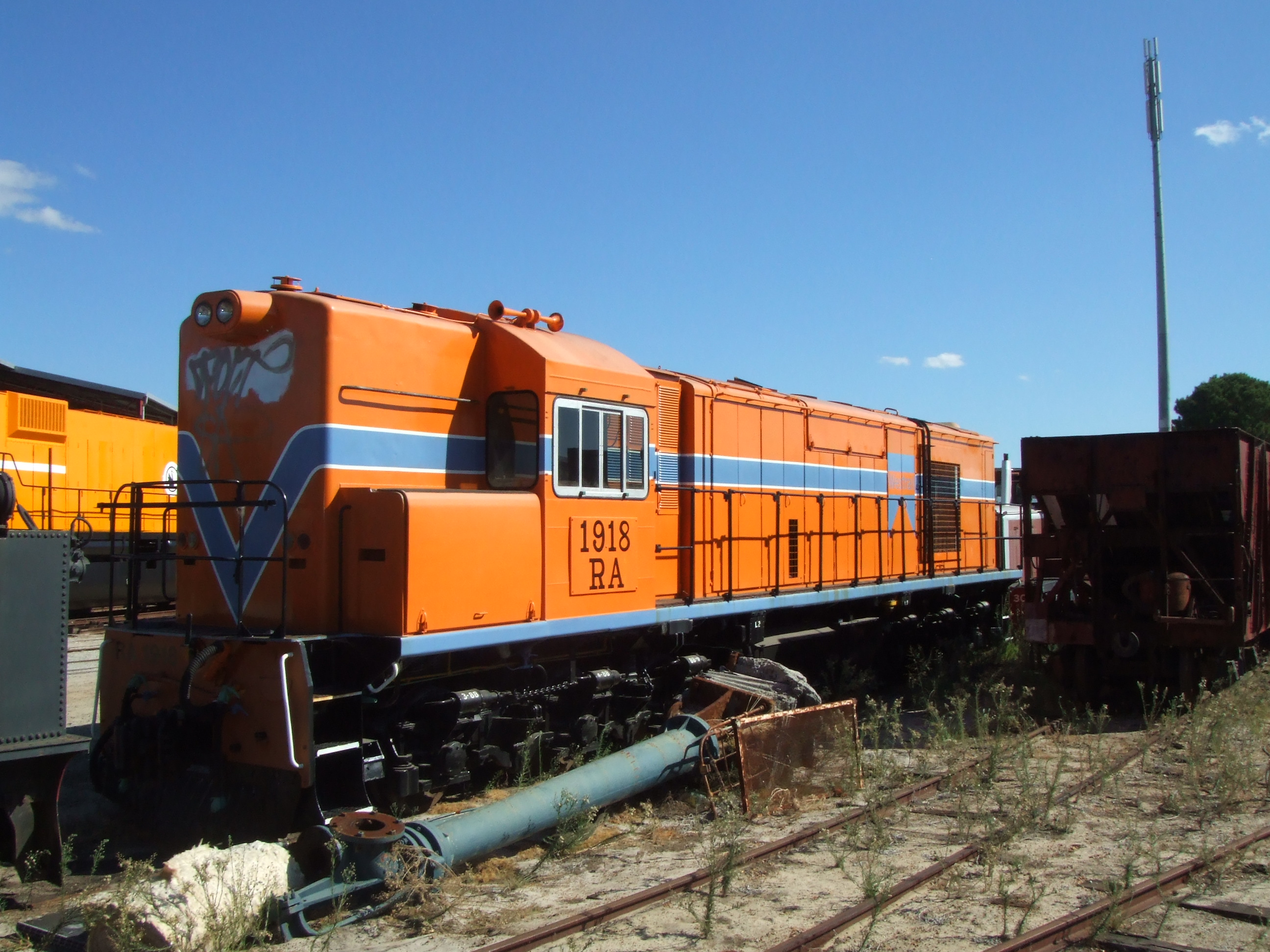
- RA1918
Type and origin
- Power type: Diesel-electric
- Builder: English Electric, Rocklea
- Serial number: A.202-A.207, A.218-A.222, A.244, A.248
- Build date: 1968-72
- Total produced: 13
Specifications
- Configuration
  - AAR: C-C
  - UIC: Co-Co, Co′Co′
- Gauge: 1,067 mm (3 ft 6 in)
- Bogies: English Electric low weight transfer
- Wheel diameter: 3 ft 1 1/2 in (0.953 m)
- Minimum curve: 264 ft (80.467 m)
- Wheelbase: 44 ft 2 in (13.462 m) total, 11 ft 3 in (3.429 m) bogie
- Length: 53 ft 6 in (16.307 m) over headstocks
- Width: 9 ft 4 in (2.845 m)
- Height: 13 ft (3.962 m)
- Axle load: 15.5 long tons (15.7 t; 17.4 short tons)
- Loco weight: 93 long tons (94 t; 104 short tons)
- Fuel type: Diesel
- Fuel capacity: 1,200 imp gal (5,500 L)
- Coolant cap.: 200 imp gal (910 L)
- Prime mover: EE 12CSVT Mk II
- RPM range: 850rpm
- Engine type: four stroke, four valves per cylinder
- Aspiration: turbo, intercooled
- Generator: EE822/16J
- Traction motors: EE548
- Cylinders: 12 Vee
- Cylinder size: 10 in × 12 in (254 mm × 305 mm)
- MU working: 110V, stepless electro-pneumatic throttle
- Loco brake: Air, proportional control
- Train brakes: Dual air and vacuum
Performance figures
- Maximum speed: 60 miles per hour (97 km/h)
- Power output: 1,950 hp (1,450 kW), gross, 1,795 hp (1,340 kW) net
- Tractive effort
  - Starting: 67,000 lbf (298.0 kN)
  - Continuous: 50,500 lbf (224.6 kN) at 10.8 mph (20 km/h)
Career
- Operators: Western Australian Government Railways
- Disposition: 12 scrapped, 1 preserved

The RA Class are diesel locomotives built by English Electric, Rocklea for the Western Australian Government Railways between 1969 and 1972. They were a revised version of the R class.

== Description ==
The RA class were a hood type general purpose diesel-electric locomotive. They were similar to the Queensland Railways 1300 class. All equipment, except traction motors, were interchangeable with the standard gauge K class. The main differences with the R class were a slight increase in length and wheelbase and deletion of the dynamic brake. They were otherwise identical mechanically and electrically.

The bogies were identical to those fitted to the R class and were an English Electric design with low weight transfer characteristics. They feature fully equalised primary spring gear, all traction motors in each bogie mounted with the nose-suspension facing inwards, traction thrust at near axle level and long pivot centres to reduce inter-bogie transfer. Adhesion loss at maximum tractive effort is limited to 4.5 per cent allowing 1,830 long tons (1,860 t; 2,050 short tons) trailing load to be hauled up a 1 in 100 grade.

== History ==
Following on from the R class, a further 11 were ordered, but without dynamic brakes. A further two were financed by the Lefroy Salt Company for use over a 13-kilometre (8.1 mi) spur off the Esperance line.

In 1973, a version of the RA class with a low nose was ordered for Tasmanian Government Railways, which classed them Z.

In 1974 the RA1914, RA1917 and RA1918 were fitted with standard gauge bogies and renumbered KA211-KA213. RA1918 has been preserved by Rail Heritage WA.

== Status Table ==
Key:	In Service	Withdrawn	Preserved	Converted	Scrapped

Serial number	Entered service	Road Number	Current/Last Owner	Status
A.203	8 November 1969	RA1906	Westrail	Scrapped, Midland Workshops (October 1992)
A.204	21 November 1969	RA1907	Westrail	Scrapped, Midland Workshops (October 1992)
A.205	3 December 1969	RA1908	Westrail	Scrapped, Midland Workshops (October 1992)
A.206	23 December 1969	RA1909	Westrail	Scrapped, Midland Workshops (October 1992)
A.202	6 February 1970	RA1910	Westrail	Scrapped, Midland Workshops (October 1992)
A.207	5 February 1970	RA1911	Westrail	Scrapped, Midland Workshops (October 1992)
A.218	8 April 1971	RA1912	Westrail	Scrapped, Midland Workshops (October 1992)
A.219	4 March 1971	RA1913	Westrail	Scrapped, Midland Workshops (October 1992)
A.220	6 May 1971	RA1914, KA211	UGL Rail	Used as an engine test bed at UGL Bassendean
A.221	6 May 1971	RA1915	Westrail	Scrapped, Midland Workshops (October 1992)
A.222	17 March 1971	RA1916	Westrail	Scrapped, Midland Workshops (October 1992)
A.244	11 July 1972	RA1917, KA212	Qube	Scrapped, Bellevue (29 May 2016)
A.248	19 July 1972	RA1918, KA213	Rail Heritage WA	Preserved by Rail Heritage WA, Bassendean
