= South Australian Railways K class =

South Australian Railways K class may refer to:

- South Australian Railways K class (broad gauge)
- South Australian Railways K class (narrow gauge), a very similar but smaller, lighter variant
