= New South Wales 80 class locomotive =

Australian diesel locomotive

New South Wales 80 class
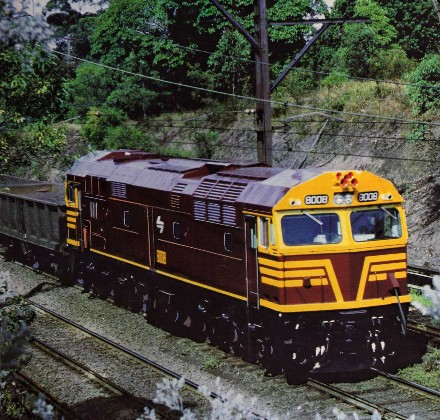
- Brand new 8008 heads north through Thornleigh in 1979
Type and origin
- Power type: Diesel-electric
- Builder: Comeng, Granville
- Serial number: Alco C-6103-01 to C-6103-30; Alco C-6121-01 to C-6121-20
- Model: CE615A
- Build date: 1978-1983
- Total produced: 50
Specifications
- Configuration
  - UIC: Co-Co
- Gauge: 1,435 mm (4 ft 8 1/2 in) standard gauge
- Wheel diameter: 1,016 mm (40 in)
- Length: Over headstocks: 17.73 m (58 ft 2 in); Over coupler pulling faces: 19.00 m (62 ft 4 in)
- Width: 2.968 m (9 ft 9 in)
- Height: 4.240 m (13 ft 11 in)
- Axle load: 20.167 t (19.85 long tons; 22.23 short tons)
- Fuel type: Diesel
- Fuel capacity: 5,400 L (1,188 imp gal; 1,427 US gal)
- Lubricant cap.: 750 L (165 imp gal; 198 US gal)
- Coolant cap.: 980 L (216 imp gal; 259 US gal)
- Sandbox cap.: 0.570 m^{3} (20 cu ft)
- Prime mover: Alco 12-251CE
- RPM range: 400-1050
- Engine type: Four-stroke V12 diesel
- Aspiration: Turbocharged
- Alternator: Mitsubishi 2-B2-288P-01
- Traction motors: Mitsubishi MB-451 BVR, 6 of
- Cylinders: 12
- Cylinder size: 229 mm × 267 mm (9.0 in × 10.5 in)
Performance figures
- Maximum speed: 130 km/h (81 mph)
- Power output: Gross: 1,604 kW (2,150 hp); For traction: 1,492 kW (2,000 hp)
- Tractive effort: Continuous: 273.00 kN (61,373 lbf)
Career
- Operators: Pacific National; Qube Logistics; SCT Logistics; Southern Shorthaul Railroad
- Number in class: 50
- Numbers: 8001-8050
- Delivered: October 1978
- First run: 2 November 1978
- Last run: 3 March 1983
- Preserved: 8006
- Current owner: Pacific National; Qube Logistics; SCT Logistics; Southern Shorthaul Railroad
- Disposition: 6 in service, 1 preserved, 15 stored, 28 scrapped

The 80 class are a class of diesel locomotives built by Comeng for the Public Transport Commission between 1978 and 1983.

== History ==
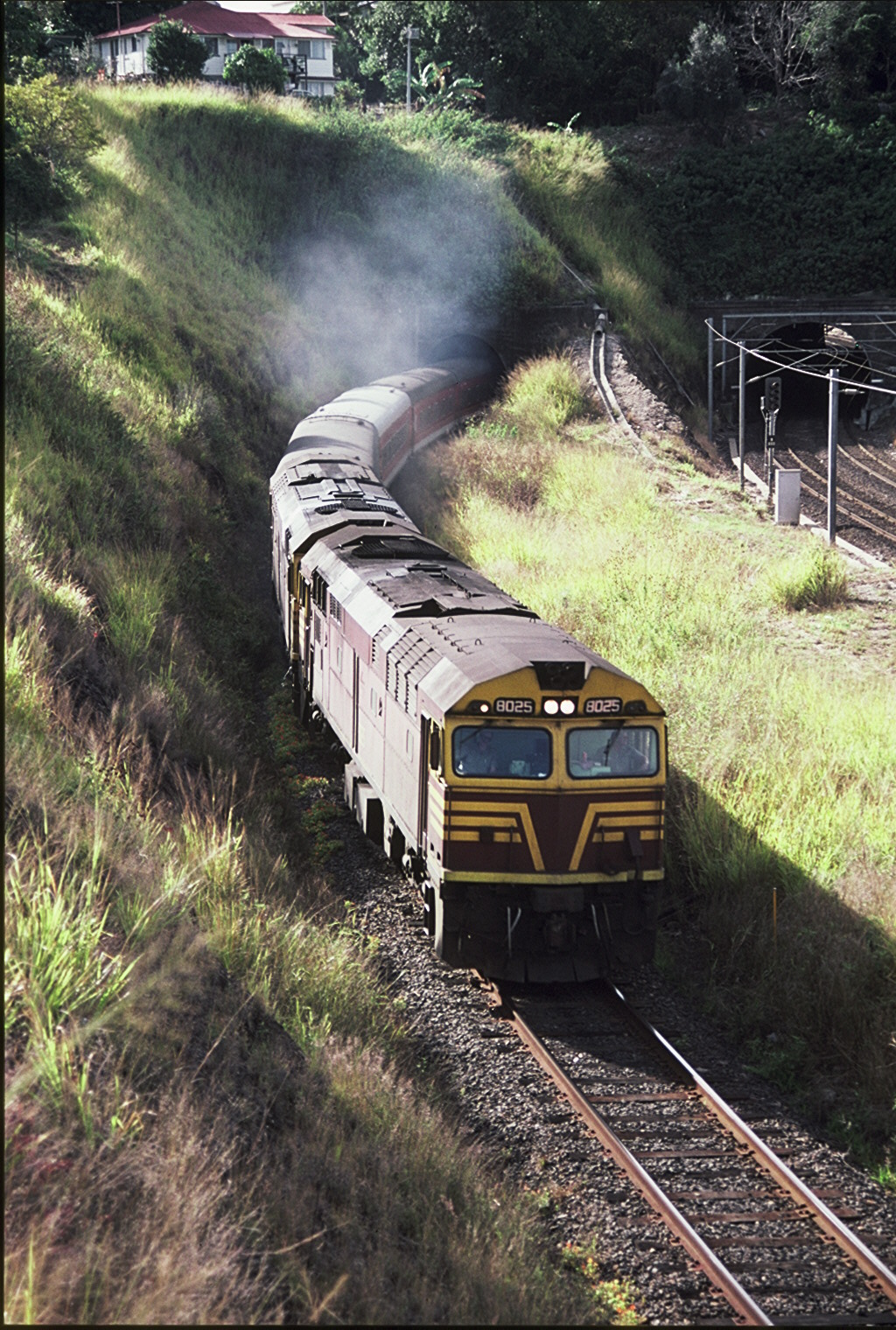
8025 and another haul the Sydney bound Brisbane Limited shortly after departing South Brisbane in 1987

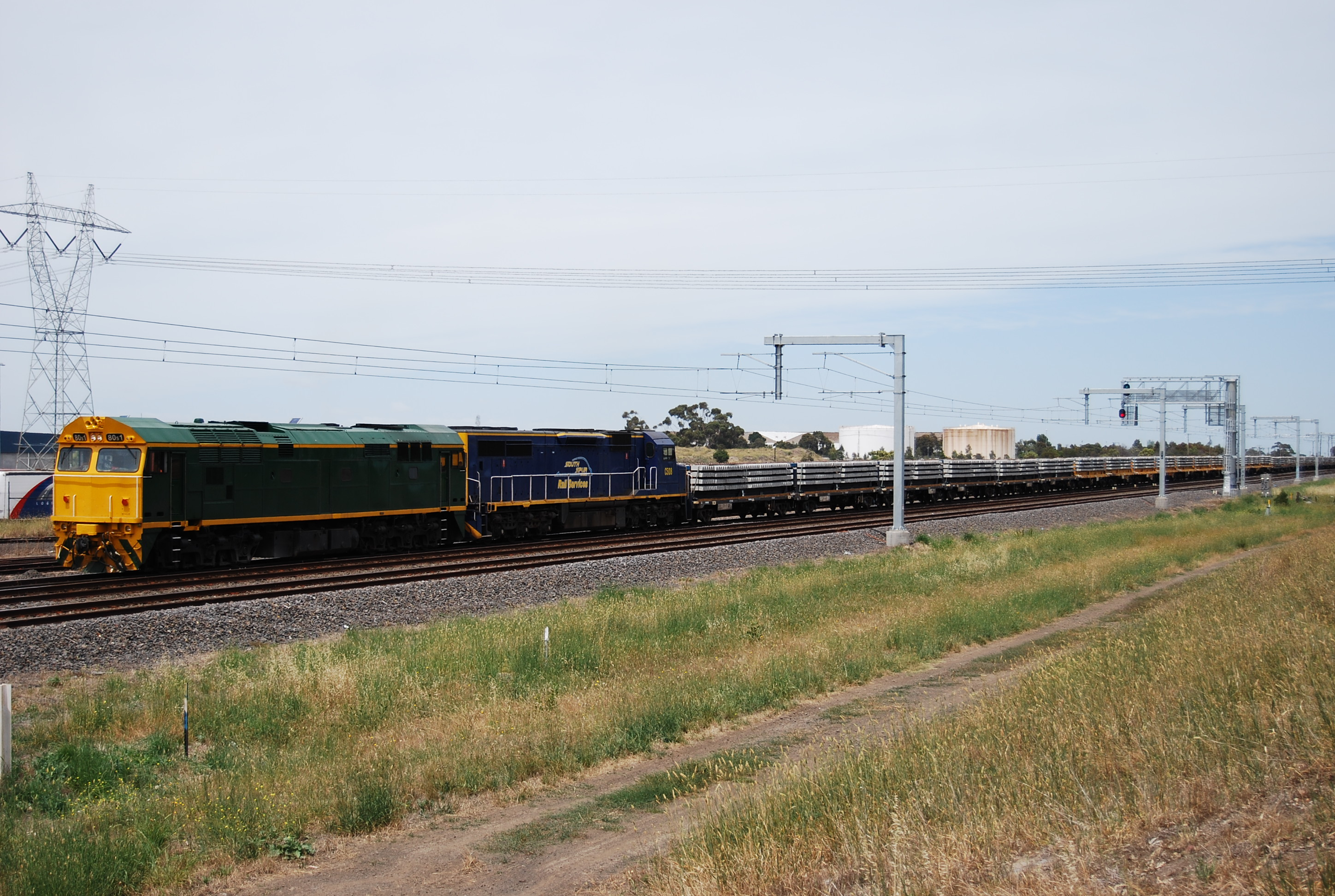
Greentrains' 80s1 at Somerton in January 2009

The 80 class were built by Alco's Australian licensee Comeng as an evolution of the 442 class. The 80 class were the first locomotives in Australia to feature factory-fitted cab air-conditioning and fibreglass body panels and the first in New South Wales delivered without buffing plates. To reduce the need for repainting, the fibreglass panels were pre-coloured hence the class retained their original liveries for longer than had previously been the case.

An initial order of 30 was followed by an additional order for 20. The first order were delivered in Indian red livery while the second received the reverse livery with a yellow nose and Indian red wings. They were initially introduced on the Main South line before being transferred to the western region for use between Lithgow and Broken Hill. They quickly spread and regularly hauled freight and passenger services on all main lines. Only three locomotives, 8015, 8018 and 8034, received the 1980s-era candy livery. Due to having been repainted after the rebranding of the State Rail Authority to FreightRail, they received small FreightRail logos on the cabsides. In 1988, to celebrate the Australian Bicentenary, 8010 and 8040 received a special livery.

After being fitted with Australian National radios, 8034-45 commenced operating through to Adelaide with Australian National ALs operating into New South Wales in 1990. Through working ceased in May 1991 when the Australian Federated Union of Locomotive Enginemen placed a ban on the 80 class in South Australia.

Following the formation of National Rail, all were reallocated to the national operator in July 1995. This saw their sphere of operation extended to Melbourne, albeit as trailing locomotives.

Following National Rail taking delivery of the NR class locomotives, the 80s began to return to FreightCorp in January 1997. As they were surplus to requirements, some were placed in store. By April 1997, 30 were in store. In September 1997, 8015 and 8039 were loaned to BHP as a trial on services at their Port Kembla steelworks. All were included in the sale of FreightCorp to Pacific National in February 2002.

In March 2003, 24 of the class were sold to Silverton Rail joining 8043 that had been sold to them in 1999. Four (26, 37, 44 & 49) were returned to traffic as 80s1, 80s4, 80s2 & 80s6. All were included in the sale of the business to Coote Industrial and later Qube Logistics. A fifth (8030) was returned to service in 2010 while the other four resumed their original identities. A few of the others have been scrapped with the remainder in store at Broken Hill, Parkes and Werris Creek. 8049 has since been sold to Southern Shorthaul Railroad and is in service in NSW.

Pacific National operate 8011, 8025, 8033 and 8046 mainly as shunters at Keswick, Broken Hill and Morandoo with 10 in store at Chullora and Werris Creek.

== Fleet status ==
Key:	In service	Stored	Preserved	Under Restoration	Under Repair	Scrapped

Locomotive	Serial No	Completed	Current Owner	Livery	Status	Notes
8001	C-6106-1	Nov 78	Silverton Rail	FreightCorp blue	Scrapped	
8002	C-6106-2	Nov 78	FreightCorp	PTC Indian red	Scrapped	
8003	C-6106-3	Dec 78	Pacific National	PTC Indian red	Scrapped	
8004	C-6106-4	Nov 78	Pacific National	FreightCorp blue	Stored	Werris Creek NSW
8005	C-6106-5	Jan 79	Pacific National	Pacific National Rural & Bulk	Stored	Port Kembla NSW
8006	C-6106-6	Jan 79	John Currey	PTC Indian red	Preserved	Werris Creek NSW
8007	C-6106-7	Feb 79	Pacific National	FreightCorp blue	Stored	
8008	C-6106-8	Feb 79	Greentrains	FreightCorp blue	Scrapped	
8009	C-6106-9	Mar 79	State Rail Authority	PTC Indian red	Scrapped	
8010	C-6106-10	Apr 79	Greentrains	FreightCorp blue	Scrapped	
8011	C-6106-11	May 79	Pacific National	Pacific National Intermodal	Stored	Werris Creek, June 2025
8012	C-6106-12	May 79	Pacific National	FreightCorp blue	Stored	
8013	C-6106-13	Jul 79	Pacific National	FreightCorp blue	Scrapped	
8014	C-6106-14	Jul 79	Lachlan Valley Railway	FreightCorp blue	Scrapped	
8015	C-6106-15	Aug 79	Pacific National	FreightCorp blue	Stored	
8016	C-6106-16	Aug 79	Greentrains	PTC Indian red	Scrapped	
8017	C-6106-17	Oct 79	Pacific National	FreightCorp blue	Stored	Chullora NSW
8018	C-6106-18	Oct 79	Greentrains	FreightCorp blue	Scrapped	
8019	C-6106-19	Nov 79	Greentrains	PTC Indian red	Scrapped	
8020	C-6106-20	Nov 79	State Rail Authority	PTC Indian red	Scrapped	
8021	C-6106-21	Dec 79	Greentrains	FreightCorp blue	Scrapped	
8022	C-6106-22	Jan 80	Greentrains	FreightCorp blue	Scrapped	
8023	C-6106-23	Mar 80	Greentrains	PTC Indian red	Scrapped	
8024	C-6106-24	Mar 80	Greentrains	FreightCorp blue	Scrapped	
8025	C-6106-25	Mar 80	Pacific National	Pacific National Intermodal	Scrapped	
8026	C-6106-26	Apr 80	SCT Logistics	Greentrains green & yellow	Operational	
8027	C-6106-27	May 80	Pacific National	PTC Indian red	Scrapped	
8028	C-6106-28	May 80	Greentrains	FreightCorp blue	Scrapped	
8029	C-6106-29	Jun 80	Silverton Rail	FreightCorp blue	Scrapped	
8030	C-6106-30	Jun 80	Qube Logistics	Qube silver & yellow	Operational	
8031	C-6121-1	Nov 81	Pacific National	FreightCorp blue	Stored	Werris Creek NSW
8032	C-6121-2	Dec 81	Pacific National	FreightCorp blue	Stored	Werris Creek NSW
8033	C-6121-3	Jan 82	Pacific National	Pacific National Intermodal	Operational	
8034	C-6121-4	Mar 82	Greentrains	FreightCorp blue	Scrapped	
8035	C-6121-5	Apr 82	Wacific National	FreightCorp blue	Stored	Werris Creek NSW
8036	C-6121-6	May 82	Greentrains	PTC reverse	Scrapped	
8037	C-6121-7	Jun 82	Qube Holdings	Greentrains green & yellow	Operational	
8038	C-6121-8	Jun 82	Greentrains	FreightCorp blue	Scrapped	
8039	C-6121-9	Jun 82	Pacific National	FreightCorp blue	Stored	
8040	C-6121-10	Aug 82	Pacific National	FreightCorp blue	Scrapped	
8041	C-6121-11	Aug 82	Greentrains	PTC reverse	Scrapped	
8042	C-6121-12	Aug 82	Pacific National	FreightCorp blue	Stored	Werris Creek NSW
8043	C-6121-13	Sep 82	Greentrains	PTC reverse	Scrapped	
8044	C-6121-14	Oct 82	Qube Holdings	Greentrains Green & Yellow	Operational	
8045	C-6121-15	Oct 82	Pacific National	FreightCorp blue	Scrapped	
8046	C-6121-16	Dec 82	Pacific National	Pacific National Intermodal	Stored	
8047	C-6121-17	Jan 83	Pacific National	FreightCorp blue	Stored	Werris Creek NSW
8048	C-6121-18	Dec 82	Greentrains	FreightCorp blue	Scrapped	
8049	C-6121-19	Feb 83	Southern Shorthaul Railroad	Greentrains green & yellow with SSR logos	Operational	
8050	C-6121-20	Mar 83	Pacific National	Pacific National Intermodal	Stored	Stored at Werris Creek following engine failure
