= Gemco Rail =

Australian railway equipment company

- Type: Public
- Headquarters: Melbourne, Victoria
- Number of locations: Forrestfield, Gladstone, Dynon, Telarah
- Products: Rolling stock maintenance & manufacture
- Operating income: $87m (June 2020)
- Net income: $12m (June 2020)
- Number of employees: 225
- Parent: Engenco
- Subsidiaries: Rail Bearing Refurbishment Services
- Website: www.gemcorail.com.au

Gemco Rail is a Western Australian company specialising in the remanufacturing and repair of railway locomotives, wagons, track maintenance equipment, bearings and other railway components.

Formed in 1987 it is based in Forrestfield, Perth. In July 2007 Gemco Rail was purchased by Coote Industrial.

Gemco Rail has manufactured items of track maintenance equipment and intermodal container wagons. It has also overhauled locomotives for fellow Engenco subsidiary Greentrains. and rebuilt some former State Rail Authority RUB carriages as crew carriages for SCT Logistics.

== Fleet ==
Locomotive	Entered service	Livery	Status
T383	Thursday, 15 October 1964	Cootes Green and Yellow	Operational, Gemco Dynon Shunter
