= Tasmanian Government Railways Z class =

Australian diesel-electric locomotives

Type and origin
- Power type: Diesel-electric
- Builder: English Electric, Rocklea
- Serial number: A.249 to A.252
- Build date: 1973
- Total produced: 4
Specifications
- Configuration
  - UIC: Co-Co
- Gauge: 1,067 mm (3 ft 6 in)
- Wheel diameter: 3 ft 1 1/2 in (0.953 m)
- Wheelbase: 42 ft 5 in (12.929 m) total, 11 ft 3 in (3.429 m) bogie
- Length: 55 ft (16.764 m) over headstocks
- Width: 9 ft 4 in (2.845 m)
- Height: 12 ft 4 1/2 in (3.772 m)
- Axle load: 16 long tons (16.3 t; 17.9 short tons)
- Loco weight: 96 long tons (97.5 t; 107.5 short tons)
- Fuel type: Diesel
- Fuel capacity: 1,200 imp gal (5,500 L)
- Prime mover: English Electric 12CSVT Mk II
- RPM range: 450–850 rpm
- Engine type: four stroke, four valves per cylinder
- Aspiration: Turbocharged, intercooled
- Generator: EE822/16J
- Traction motors: Six EE558
- Cylinders: V12
- Cylinder size: 10 in × 12 in (254 mm × 305 mm)
- MU working: 110V, stepless electro-pneumatic throttle
- Train brakes: Vacuum, converted to air (1984–1985)
Performance figures
- Maximum speed: 60 miles per hour (97 km/h)
- Power output: 2,025 hp (1,510 kW) gross, 1,850 hp (1,380 kW) net
- Tractive effort
  - Continuous: 54,000 lbf (240.2 kN) at 10.5 mph (20 km/h)
Career
- Operators: Tasmanian Government Railways; AN Tasrail; TasRail
- Number in class: 4
- Numbers: Z1–Z4
- First run: June 1973
- Current owner: The Q Train; Don River Railway
- Disposition: All preserved

The Tasmanian Government Railway Z class are a class of diesel locomotives built by English Electric, Rocklea for the Tasmanian Government Railways in 1973. They were a development of the Western Australian Government Railways R class and were the last of a line of very successful locomotives fitted with the English Electric 12CSVT Mk II engine.

== History ==
With the construction of the new line from Launceston to Bell Bay, the Tasmanian Government Railways placed an order for four 1752 kW locomotives with English Electric. However, with the locomotive still under development, it was decided to purchase four 1380 kW locomotives that were an evolution of the Western Australian RA class locomotives with a low nose profile and vacuum brakes. At 96 tons, they were considerably heavier than the previous heaviest locomotives on the network, the Y class at 58 tons, requiring significant upgrades to infrastructure. The first was delivered in December 1972.

In March 1978 the Z class were included in the transfer of the Tasmanian Government Railways to Australian National. In 1984/85 all had their vacuum brakes replaced with air brakes.

In June 1998, they were renumbered as the 2110 class. All four locomotives were modified for driver-only operation between 1998 and 2001, by having their noses lowered further and the size of the front cab windows increased.

All remained in service with TasRail until stored in May 2014 with the entry into service of the new TR class.

In 2022, The Q Train acquired Z1 and Z4 for revenue use on their restaurant rail services on the Bellarine Railway. Z1 was delivered in March and Z4 in May. Z2 and Z3 were donated to the Don River Railway. Z4 entered service in February 2024, with Z1 following in June 2025. It is common to see the Bellarine locomotives running long end leading, something which was never done in Tasmania. As of 2025 and onwards, all 4 members of the class have survived into preservation.

== Status table ==
Name	Original no	Current no	Owner	Livery	Status
Northern Progress	Z1	Z1	The Q Train	TGR yellow	Preserved / Operational
Bell Bay Pioneer	Z2	2111	Don River Railway	AN/Tasrail reverse yellow and green	Preserved
	Z3	2112	Don River Railway	ATN/Tasrail burgundy and yellow	Preserved
	Z4	Z4	The Q Train	AN/Tasrail green and yellow	Preserved / Operational
