= WAGR K class (1891) =

Class of Australian 0-6-2T locomotive

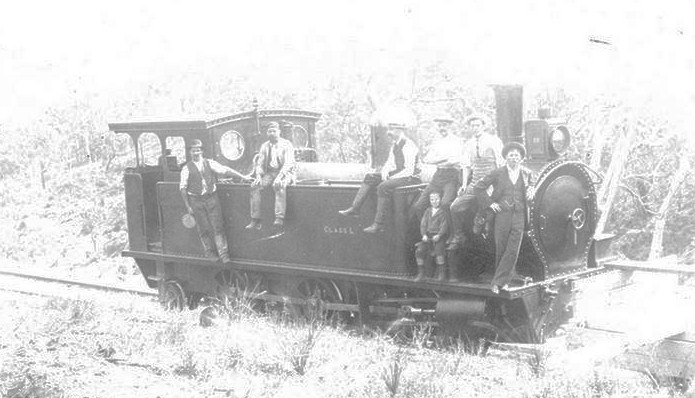
- The locomotive after it was reclassified as L5
Type and origin
- Power type: Steam
- Builder: Hudswell, Clarke & Co
- Serial number: 387
Specifications
- Configuration
  - Whyte: 0-6-2T
- Gauge: 3 ft 6 in (1,067 mm)
- Fuel type: Coal
- Fuel capacity: 1.5 long tons 0 cwt (3,400 lb or 1.5 t)
- Water cap.: 656 imp gal (2,980 L; 788 US gal)
- Firebox
  - Grate area: 11 sq ft (1.0 m^{2})
- Boiler pressure: 120 lbf/in^{2} (0.83 MPa)
Performance figures
- Tractive effort: 9,649 lbf (42.92 kN)
- Factor of adh.: 6.2
Career
- Operators: Western Australian Government Railways
- Numbers: K19
- First run: 27 March 1891
- Disposition: Scrapped

The WAGR K class was a single member class of 0-6-2T tank locomotive used intermittently by the Western Australian Government Railways (WAGR) between 1891 and 1926.

== History ==
The K class engine was built in 1891 by Hudswell, Clarke & Co, Leeds, for the construction of Fremantle Harbour. It entered service with the Public Works Department, moving later the same year to WAGR as K19.

The locomotive was used subsequently on a number of other construction projects, passing into and out of WAGR ownership on several occasions with the Public Works Department, Goldfields Water Supply Administration and Fremantle Harbour Works Department operating it at various times across the state from Geraldton in the north to Bunbury in the south. When it made one of its returns to WAGR ownership in 1903, the class designation had been reallocated to another class along with number 19, so it was reclassified as L5.

In 1926 it was stored at Midland Railway Workshops and scrapped in about 1931.

== Namesakes ==
The K class designation was reused by the K class locomotives introduced in 1893 and again in the 1960s when the K class diesel locomotives entered service.

== See also ==
- History of rail transport in Western Australia
- List of Western Australian locomotive classes
