= Spirit of the West (train) =

Restaurant train that operated in Perth, Western Australia from 2002 to 2008

- K205 leads the Spirit of the West down the Avon Valley in April 2006

Overview
- Service type: Restaurant train
- Status: Ceased
- Locale: Western Australia
- First service: 18 October 2002
- Last service: 31 May 2008
- Former operator: South Spur Rail Services

Route
- Termini: East Perth; Leighton; West Toodyay

Technical
- Rolling stock: Ex Commonwealth Railways
- Track gauge: 1,435 mm (4 ft 8 1/2 in)

The Spirit of the West was a restaurant train operated by South Spur Rail Services out of Perth, Western Australia from 2002 until 2008.

== History ==
In 2001, the Midland Railway Company was formed by the South Spur Rail Services (SSRS), taking the name of the former Western Australian operator. On 18 October 2002 it commenced operating under the Spirit of the West brand with two services; the City to Port Indulgence and The Avon Experience.

The City to Port Indulgence operated on Friday and Saturday evenings as a dinner service from East Perth via the Eastern Railway to Woodbridge before proceeding south via the Kwinana line to Canning Vale and then north over the Fremantle line to Leighton. It ceased in 2005 after being vandalised on the Forrestfield to Cockburn section.

The Avon Experience operated as a Sunday lunch service from East Perth via the Eastern Railway to West Toodyay.

The service received two Gold Plate awards for Best Tourist Restaurant. It last ran on 31 May 2008.

== Rolling stock ==
The service commenced with SSRS' K205 hauling a power van and three restored carriages hired from Rail Heritage WA that had been restored for the Centenary of the Federation of Australia. A further three carriages were acquired between 2003 and 2005. All carriages had been built for the Commonwealth Railways to operate on the Trans-Australian. The SSRS owned stock was painted in a maroon and cream livery, the hired Rail Heritage WA stock brown and cream. All were of 1,435 mm (4 ft 8 1/2 in) and were stabled at the Midland Railway Workshops.

The consist of the train usually involved a combination of the following:

Number	Builder	Year built	Notes	Image
K205	English Electric, Rocklea	1966	South Spur Rail Services locomotive, ex Westrail	
HRGA96L|	Niedrsachsische Waggonfabrik, West Germany	1952	Power van purchased from Rail Heritage WA mid-2002	
BRBF1	Clyde Engineering, Sydney	1915	Sleeping carriage named the Federation Carriage, donated by Australian National to Rail Heritage WA in 1995 and restored	
26AF	Port Augusta Works	1917	Timber lounge car named the Heritage Carriage, built on the frame of flat wagon RA668, donated by Australian National to Rail Heritage WA in 1995 and restored	
D20	A Pengelly & Co, Adelaide	1918	Dining carriage named the Colonial Carriage, donated by Australian National to Rail Heritage WA in 1995 and restored	
DD136F	Commonwealth Engineering, Sydney	1963	ex the MurrayLander kitchen/dining car named the Regency Carriage	
AFB137V	Commonwealth Engineering, Sydney	1963	ex Australian Railroad Group, named the Imperial Carriage, used for cocktail and corporate functions	
EI84	Wegmann & Co. Kessel, Germany	1952	Observation car ex Australian Railroad Group, named the Regal Carriage	

Due to the occasional motive power shortage, the Spirit of the West was sometimes hauled by another locomotive. Such rare workings included Pacific National's Kewdale Freight Terminal shunter 8112, Specialised Container Transport's Forrestfield shunter H5, and other locomotives from the South Spur Rail fleet: D48, D49, K206, K210, KA212. D48 was painted similarly to K205.
