= K-class submarine =

The term K-class submarine may refer to:

- British K-class submarine
- Norwegian K-class submarine
- United States K-class submarine
- United States K-1-class submarine (1951)
- Soviet K-class submarine
