= Midland Railway Workshops =

Railway workshops in Midland, Western Australia

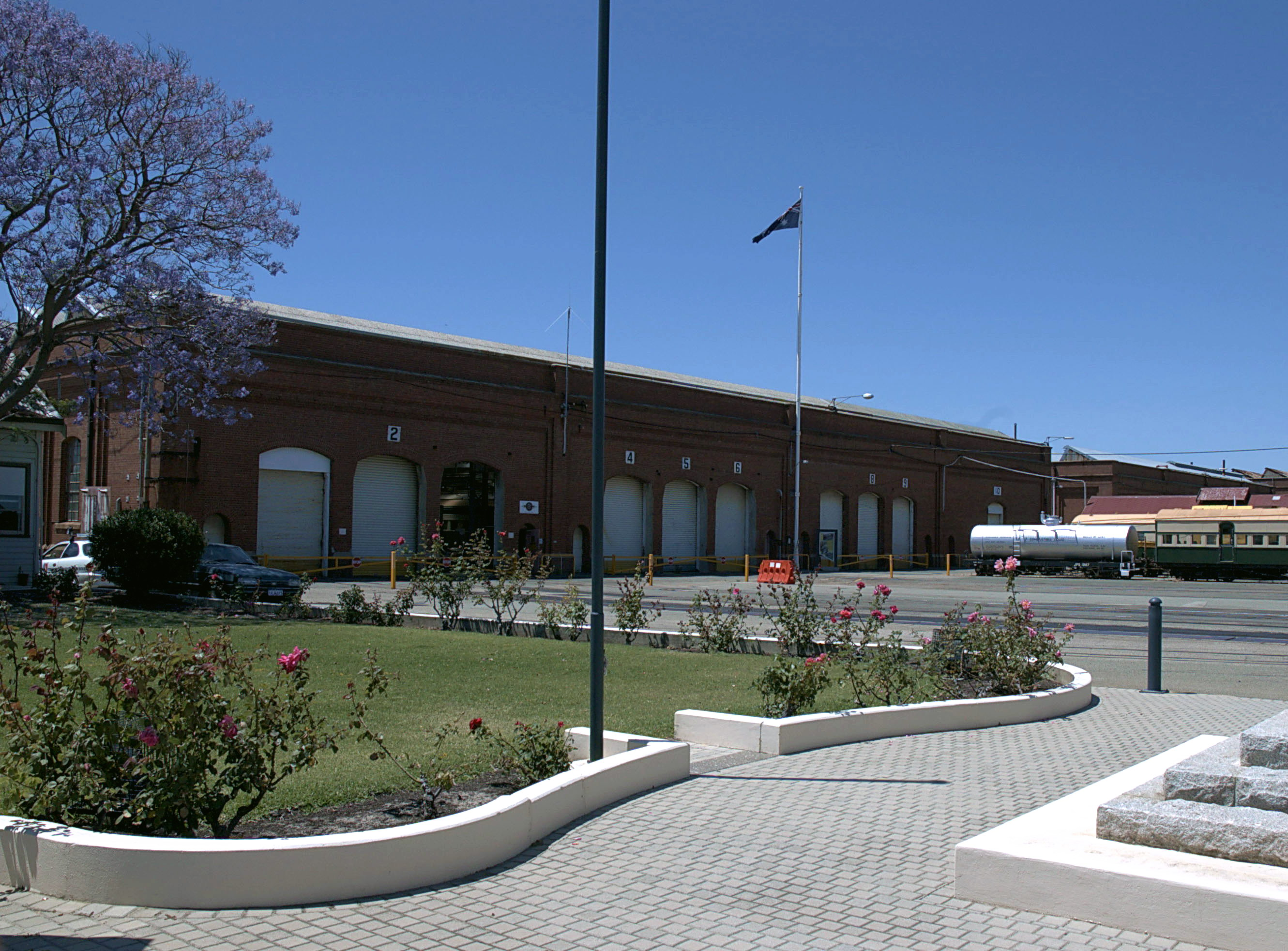
- Midland Railway Workshops in 2005

General information
- Type: Workshops for the Western Australian Government Railways
- Location: Midland, Western Australia
- Coordinates: 31.8947°S 116.0051°E

Western Australia Heritage Register
- Type: State Registered Place
- Designated: 10 June 2008
- Reference no.: 3273

The Midland Railway Workshops in Midland, Western Australia, were the main workshops for the Western Australian Government Railways (WAGR) for over 80 years, (1904-1994).

== History ==
The first railway workshops in Western Australia were located at Fremantle and shifted to Midland in 1904.

The Midland Railway Workshops were involved with all WAGR rolling stock and engine construction and maintenance. Steam engines continued to operate on mainline service until 1971, and all major maintenance occurred at the workshops.

== Workforce ==
Generations of workers at the workshops had considerable numbers of European migrants who arrived in Australia with limited English language, and there were significant groups of Italian migrants in the workforce.

The workforce of the workshops had a rich history and, since closing, there have been projects to record oral history and collect information about the place and people involved.

== Closure ==
In April 1993, the Richard Court Liberal Party (conservative) State Government announced that the workshops would be eventually closed. A number of protests and rallies were held to save the workshops, but they were not successful. On 4 March 1994, the remaining workers assembled at the traditional workshops meeting area, the flagpole. Long-time employee and timekeeper, Kevin Mountain lowered the Australian flag for the last time, ending not only his career but 90 years of Western Australian railway history.

== Coal dam ==
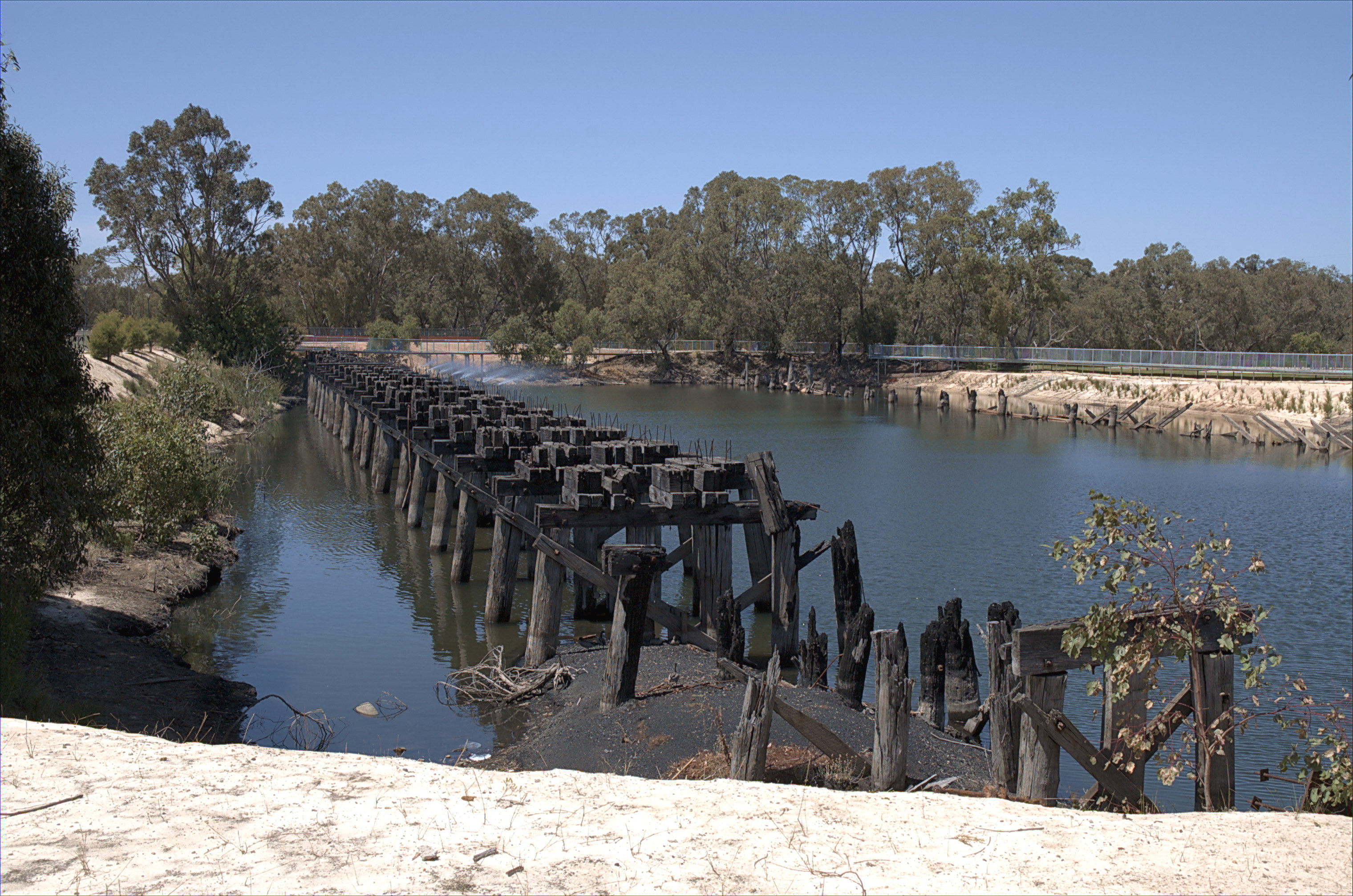
Midland Workshops coal dam

Located at the far western end of the workshops site is a 200 by 50 metres (660 by 160 ft) dam. Initially created as a storage dam for water supplies in the late 1890s, it was increased in size in 1947 for coal storage. A treatment plant built on the site in 1974 used the dam to discharge wastewater.

Development of the Woodbridge Lakes housing estate near the site prompted environmental studies of the heavy metals and sludge within the dam. The dam has been retained for its heritage value as a water feature, with some of the area comprising public open space.

== Memorial to Fallen Soldiers ==
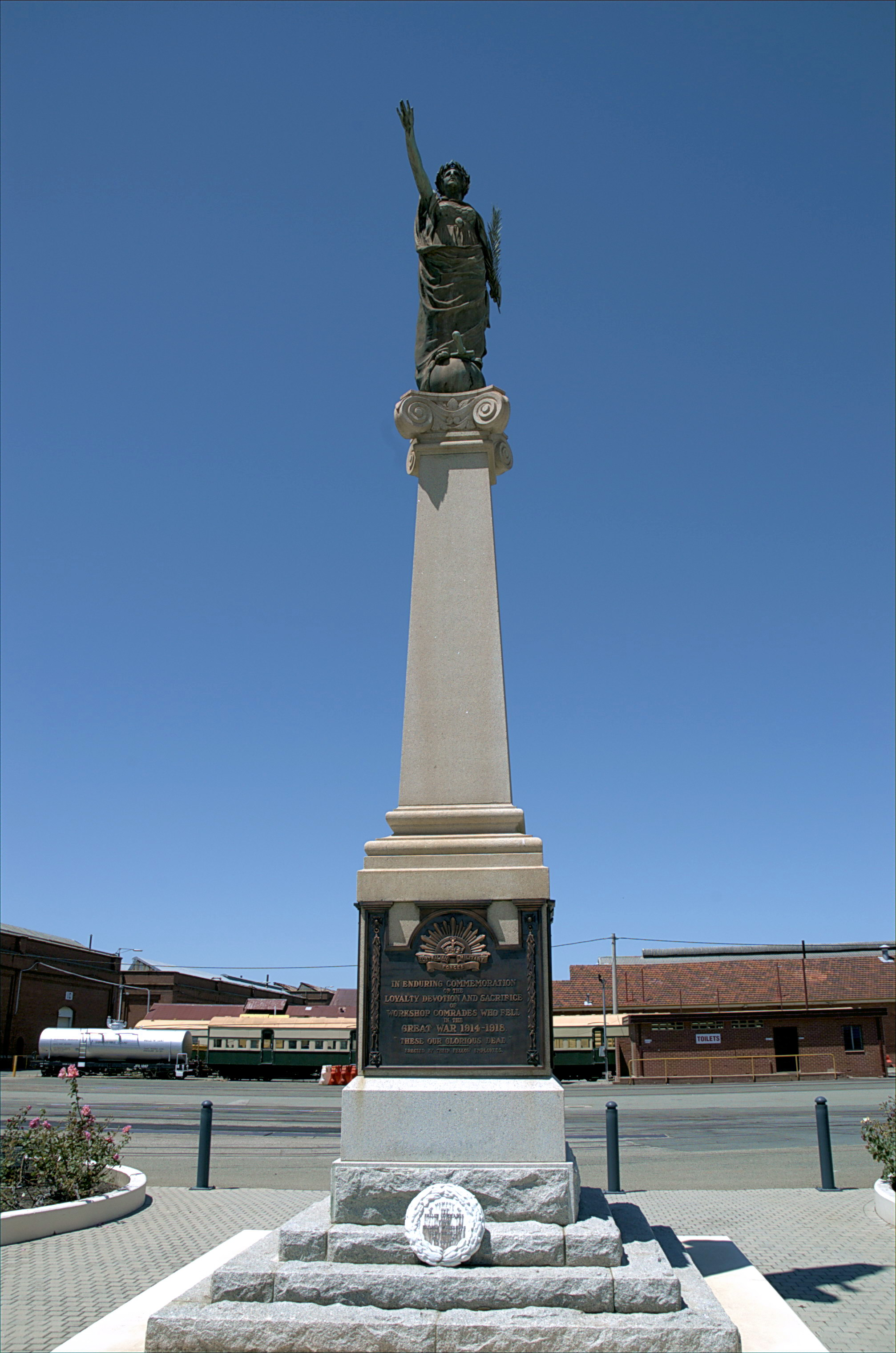
Memorial to Fallen Soldiers

At the courtyard entrance to the workshops is a Memorial to Fallen Soldiers. The memorial commemorates the 70 railway workers who enlisted from the workshops and died in World War I. It was unveiled in 1925. A further 25 men who lost their lives in World War II were later added to the memorial. The figure of Peace atop the memorial was the work of Pietro Porcelli.

The memorial reads "In enduring commemoration of the loyalty devotion and sacrifice of workshop comrades who fell in the Great War 1914–1918. These our glorious dead. Erected by their fellow employees."

== Changes ==
Recent years saw use of the workshops for a very limited period of time – narrow gauge access to the workshops from the main railway line was re-instated in mid-2004, and effectively ceased in late 2007. The Midland Redevelopment Authority (MRA) appears to have removed the workshops from any significant working rail heritage status.

Until late 2007 the Australian Railway Historical Society had performed restoration work and housed part of their collection in the workshops.

South Spur Rail Services used to occupy several roads, in part due to their association with the Spirit of the West restaurant train that was stabled in the workshops; they have since moved to an area closer to Bellevue and the Roe Highway overpass.

Transwa used the workshops for storage of the new Prospector and AvonLink railcars during their trials. Likewise, Transperth used the workshops for storage of the new B series railcars upon delivery from Queensland until bogie exchanges from standard gauge to narrow gauge could take place, at which time the cars were moved to either the Claisebrook or Nowergup depots.

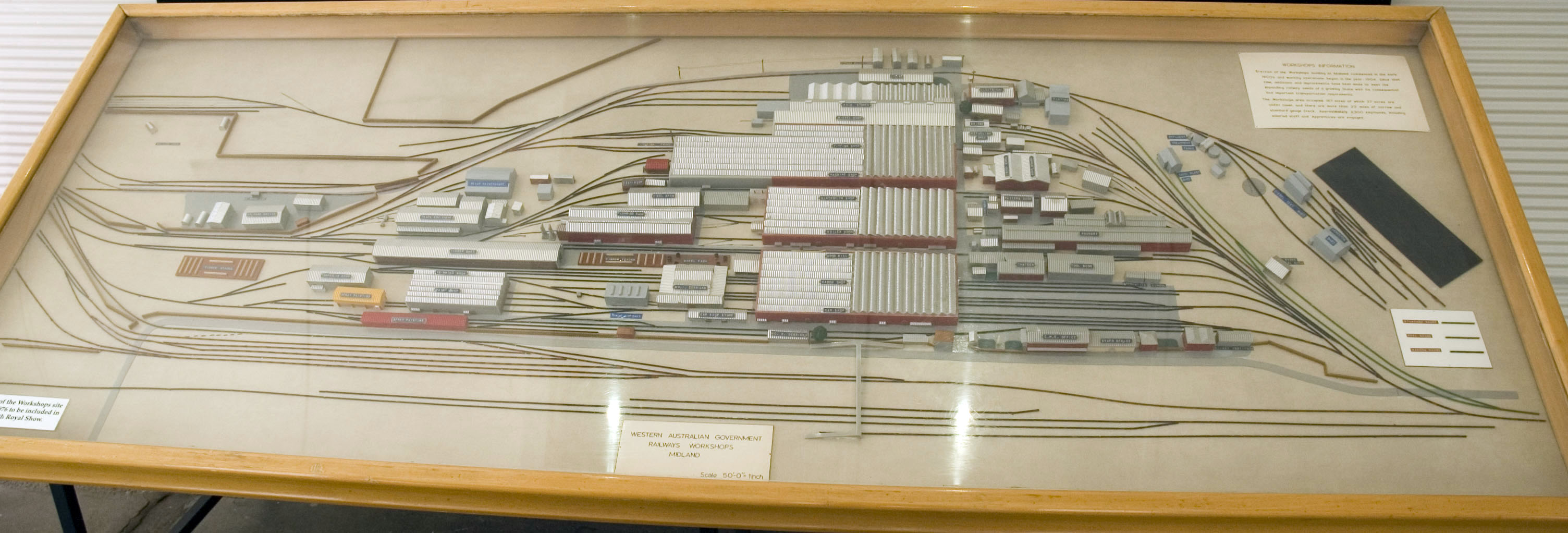
Midland Railway Workshops yard model

Despite its disinterest in supporting working rail heritage to continue at the workshops, the MRA has produced an undated pamphlet that gives a brief overview of the workshops history, which is derived from various sources including the Midland Railway Workshops Site Conservation Policy of 1994 produced by Heritage and Conservation Professionals.

The eastern end of the workshops site has already been developed into a bulky goods retail area and the Western Australian Police Operations Centre has incorporated the former Flanging Shop into their centre. The St John of God Midland Public and Private Hospitals also occupy a portion of the former workshops site.

The section of the workshop area to the east of the main railway buildings has been demolished to make way for projects which the Midland Redevelopment Authority has earmarked for further development. The main buildings in the middle of the workshop area remain.

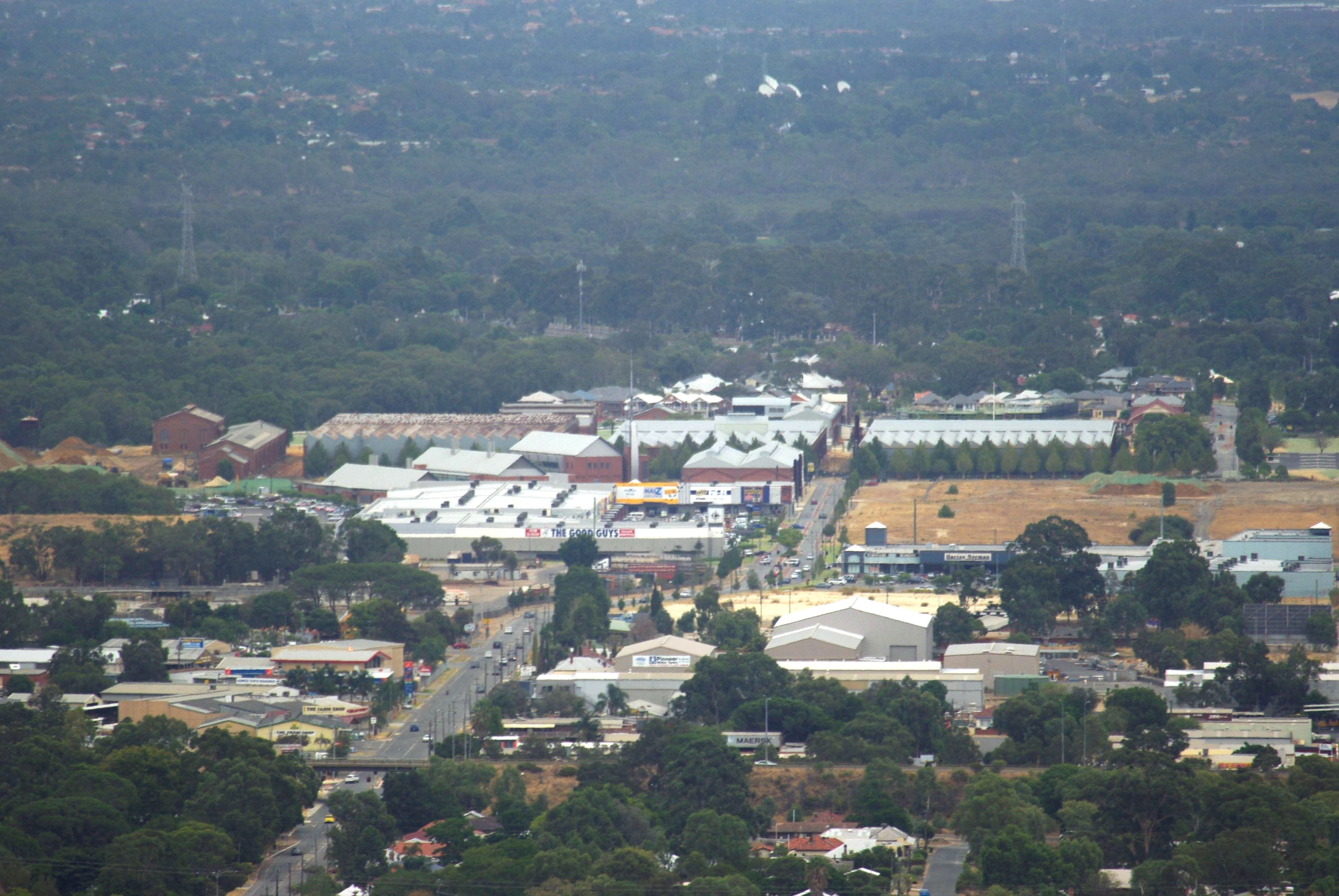
Midland Railway Workshops from Greenmount Hill

== Heritage strategy ==
In 2001 and 2004 the Heritage strategy for the Midland Central redevelopment area was produced by the Midland Redevelopment Authority. It identified railway workshops' "zones of significance" and assessed and considered as important heritage items more than 40 structures and areas including:

- Chief Mechanical Engineer's Office
- Laboratory - chemical and metal testing
- Railway Institute
- Pattern Shop
- Tank Building/Pattern Store
- Power House
- Boiler House/Copper Shop
- Tarpaulin Shop/ Electrical Shop
- Block 1
- Block 2
- Block 3
- Gatekeepers Office
- Timekeepers Office
- Foundry
- Main Store
- Ambulance Building
- Tool Room
- Canteen
- Recreation Hall
- Plating Shop
- Copper Shop
- Weighbridge
- Sewerage system
- Elevated tank
- Hydraulic Accumulator
- Oil Store
- Paint Shop
- War Memorial and Garden
- Main Conduit
- Shunting Yard
- Underwater Coal Storage Dam
- Flagpole
- Compressed Air Tanks
- Supply Shed (1 and 2)
- Wells
- Panel Shop

== Rail heritage centre ==
In 2004, the possibility of a railway heritage centre based in part of the workshops was investigated by the Midland Redevelopment Authority, following public meetings and consultation. However, the possibility of such a centre was not followed.

== Personnel ==
George Alfred Julius, inventor of the automatic totalisator, was a premium apprentice here in the early years of the 20th century, before moving to Sydney and co-founding his own engineering partnership.
