= WAGR R class (diesel) =

Class of Australian Co′Co′ diesel-electric locomotives

Western Australian Government Railways R class
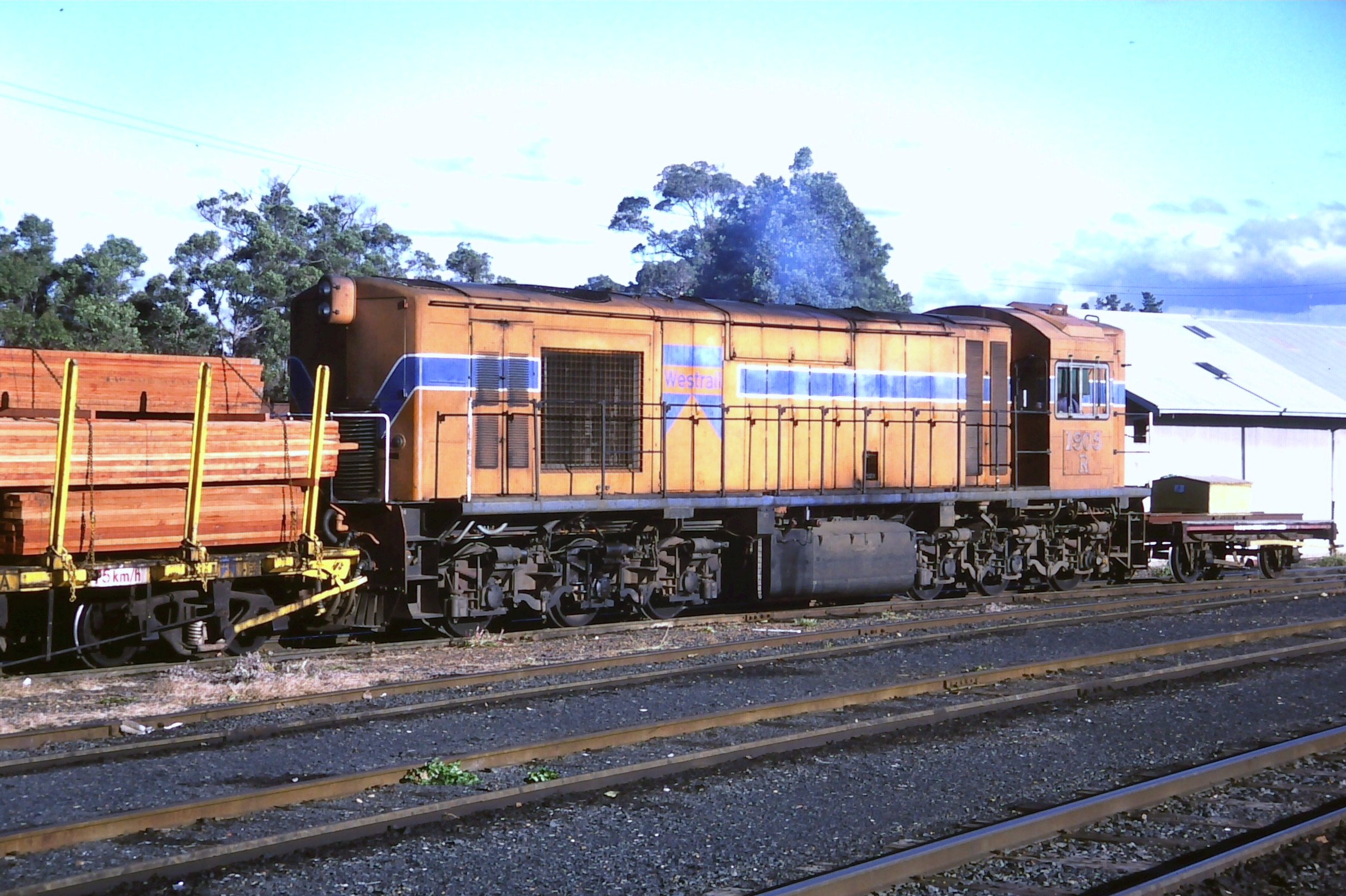
- R1905 at Manjimup in July 1986
Type and origin
- Power type: Diesel-electric
- Builder: English Electric, Rocklea
- Serial number: A.166-A.167, A.171, A.173-A.174
- Build date: 1968
- Total produced: 5
Specifications
- Configuration
  - AAR: C-C
  - UIC: Co-Co
- Gauge: 1,067 mm (3 ft 6 in)
- Bogies: English Electric low weight transfer
- Wheel diameter: 3 ft 1 1/2 in (0.953 m)
- Minimum curve: 264 ft (80.467 m)
- Wheelbase: 40 ft 8 in (12.395 m) total, 11 ft 3 in (3.429 m) bogie
- Length: 50 ft (15.240 m) over headstocks
- Width: 9 ft 4 in (2.845 m)
- Height: 13 ft (3.962 m)
- Axle load: R1901-R1902: 15 long tons (15 t; 17 short tons), R1903-R1905: 16 long tons (16 t; 18 short tons)
- Loco weight: R1901-R1902: 88 long tons (89 t; 99 short tons); R1903-R1905: 95.5 long tons (97.0 t; 107.0 short tons)
- Fuel type: Diesel
- Fuel capacity: 1,200 imp gal (5,500 L)
- Coolant cap.: 200 imp gal (910 L)
- Prime mover: EE 12CSVT Mk II
- RPM range: 850rpm
- Engine type: four stroke, four valves per cylinder
- Aspiration: turbo, intercooled
- Generator: EE822/16J
- Traction motors: EE548
- Cylinders: 12 Vee
- Cylinder size: 10 in × 12 in (254 mm × 305 mm)
- MU working: 110V, stepless electro-pneumatic throttle
- Loco brake: Air, proportional control, dynamic
- Train brakes: Dual air and vacuum
Performance figures
- Maximum speed: 60 miles per hour (97 km/h)
- Power output: 1,950 hp (1,450 kW), gross, 1,795 hp (1,340 kW) net
- Tractive effort: 50,500 lbf (224.6 kN) at 10.8 mph (20 km/h)
Career
- Operators: Western Australian Government Railways
- Number in class: 5
- Numbers: R1901-R1905
- First run: February 12th, 1968
- Disposition: 5 scrapped

The R Class are diesel locomotives built by English Electric, Rocklea for the Western Australian Government Railways in 1968. They were followed by the revised RA class.

== Description ==
The R class were a hood type general purpose diesel-electric locomotive. They were similar to the Queensland Railways 1300 class. All equipment, except traction motors, were interchangeable with the standard gauge K class. The bogies are an English Electric design with low weight transfer characteristics. They feature fully equalised primary spring gear, all traction motors in each bogie mounted with the nose-suspension facing inwards, traction thrust at near axle level and long pivot centres to reduce inter-bogie transfer. Adhesion loss at maximum tractive effort is limited to 4.5 per cent allowing 1,830 long tons (1,860 t; 2,050 short tons) trailing load to be hauled up a 1 in 100 grade.

== History ==
In 1968 the Western Australian Government Railways took delivery of five narrow gauge versions of the K class for use on bauxite traffic, the last three being fitted with 6 tonnes (5.9 long tons; 6.6 short tons) of ballast to improve their tractive effort. All were fitted with dynamic brakes.

== Fleet list ==
Serial number	Entered service	Road number	Last owner	Status
A.166	12 February 1968	R1901	Westrail	Scrapped, Midland Workshops (October 1992)
A.167	15 March 1968	R1902	Greentrains	Scrapped, Bellevue (28 May 2016)
A.171	2 May 1968	R1903	Westrail	Scrapped, Midland Workshops (October 1992)
A.173	14 June 1968	R1904	Westrail	Scrapped, Midland Workshops (October 1992)
A.174	26 June 1968	R1905	Westrail	Scrapped, Midland Workshops (October 1992)
