= Energy class =

Earthquake magnitude scale

Energy class – also called energy class K or K-class , and denoted by K (from the Russian класс) – is a measure of the force or magnitude of local and regional earthquakes used in countries of the former Soviet Union, and Cuba and Mongolia. K is nominally the logarithm of seismic energy (in Joules) radiated by an earthquake, as expressed in the formula K = log E_{S}. Values of K in the range of 12 to 15 correspond approximately to the range of 4.5 to 6 in other magnitude scales; a magnitude M_{w} 6.0 quake will register between 13 and 14.5 on various K-class scales. The energy class system was developed by seismologists of the Soviet Tadzhikskaya Complex [Interdisciplinary] Seismological Expedition established in the remote Garm (Tajikistan) region of Central Asia in 1954 after several devastating earthquakes in that area.

The Garm region is one of the most seismically active regions of the former Soviet Union, with up to 5,000 earthquakes per year. The volume of processing needed, and the rudimentary state of seismological equipment and methods at that time, led the expedition workers to develop new equipment and methods. V. I. Bune is credited with developing a scale based on an earthquake's seismic energy, although S. L. Solov'ev seems to have made major contributions. (In contrast to the "Richter" and other magnitude scales developed by Western seismologists, which estimate the magnitude from the amplitude of some portion of the seismic waves generated, an indirect measure of seismic energy.)

However, proper estimation of E_{S} requires more sophisticated tools than were available at the time, and Bune's method was unworkable. A more practical revision was presented by T. G. Rautian in 1958 and 1960; by 1961 K-class was being used across the USSR. A key change was to estimate E_{S} on the basis of peak amplitude of the seismic waves – particularly, the sum of maximum P-wave and maximum S-wave – within the first three seconds. As a result, K-class became a kind of local magnitude scale, similarly limited to local and regional earthquakes of about M 6.5 (K 15) or less, above which point it saturates (underestimates the magnitude).

Rautian also developed a nomogram to simplify some of the calculations, and used a number of simplifying assumptions appropriate for the Garm region. That version is sometimes labelled K_{R} to distinguish it from other versions – K_{F}, K_{S}, K_{FS}, K_{C}, etc. – that have been adapted for the Sakhalin, Kurile, and Kamchatka regions in the Far East.

There are various formulas to convert K-class to other magnitude scales; these are usually specific to the regional network. M_{(K)} (or some variant) is sometimes used to identify magnitudes that have been calculated from a K value.

== See also ==
- Seismic magnitude scales

== Sources ==
- Bindi, D.; Parolai, S.; Oth, K.; Abdrakhmatov, A.; Muraliev, A.; Zschau, J. (October 2011), "Intensity prediction equations for Central Asia", Geophysical Journal International, 187 (1): 327–337, Bibcode:2011GeoJI.187..327B, doi:10.1111/j.1365-246X.2011.05142.x.
- Bormann, P.; Fugita, K.; MacKey, K. G.; Gusev, A. (July 2012), "Information Sheet 3.7: The Russian K-class system, its relationships to magnitudes and its potential for future development and application", in Bormann (ed.), New Manual of Seismological Observatory Practice 2 (NMSOP-2), doi:10.2312/GFZ.NMSOP-2_IS_3.7, archived from the original (PDF) on 2019-08-04.
- Bormann, P.; Wendt, S.; Di Giacomo, D. (2013), "Chapter 3: Seismic Sources and Source Parameters", in Bormann (ed.), New Manual of Seismological Observatory Practice 2 (NMSOP-2), doi:10.2312/GFZ.NMSOP-2_ch3, archived from the original (PDF) on 2019-08-04.
- Bunz, V. I.; Gzovskiy, M. V., eds. (1963) [1960], Methods for a Detailed Study of Seismicity [Metody Detal'nogg Izucheniya Sesmichonsti], Moscow: Izdatel'stvo Akademii Nauk SSSR. Draft English translation of the original Russian by the U.S. Air Force Foreign Technology Division, document FTD-TT-62-269/1+2. Armed Services Technical Information Agency document AD400507.
- Neresov, V. I.; Riznichenko, Yu. V. (1963) [1960], "Introduction", in Bunz, V. I.; Gzovskiy, M. V.; Riznichenko, Yu. V. (eds.), Methods for a Detailed Study of Seismicity [Metody Detal'nogg Izucheniya Sesmichonsti], Moscow: Izdatel'stvo Akademii Nauk SSSR.
- Rautian, T. G.; Khalturin, V. I.; Fujita, K.; Mackey, K. G.; Kendall, A. D. (November–December 2007), "Origins and Methodology of the Russian Energy K-Class System and Its Relationship to Magnitude Scales", Seismological Research Letters, 78 (6): 579–590, Bibcode:2007SeiRL..78..579R, doi:10.1785/gssrl.78.6.579.
- Rautian, T.; Leith, W. S. (September 2002), "Developing Composite Regional Catalogs of the Seismicity of the Former Soviet Union." (PDF), 24th Seismic Research Review – Nuclear Explosion Monitoring: Innovation and Integration, Ponte Vedra Beach, Florida.
