= South Spur Rail Services =

Former Western Australian railway company

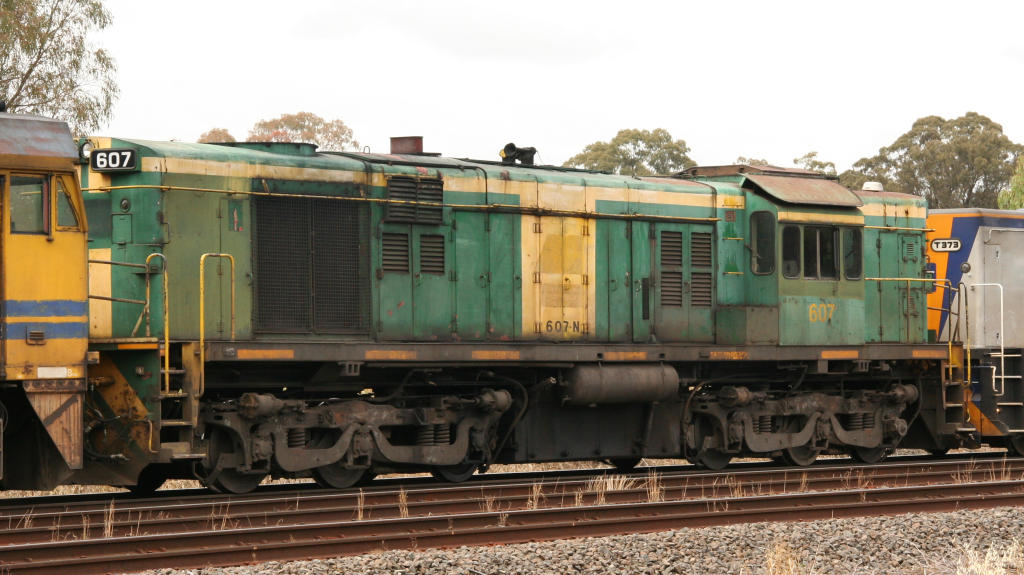
- Former Australian National 600 class in December 2008
- Industry: Railway operator
- Founded: January 1997
- Founder: James Wilson
- Headquarters: Perth
- Area served: New South Wales; Western Australia
- Parent: P&O Trans Australia
- Subsidiaries: Southern & Silverton Rail

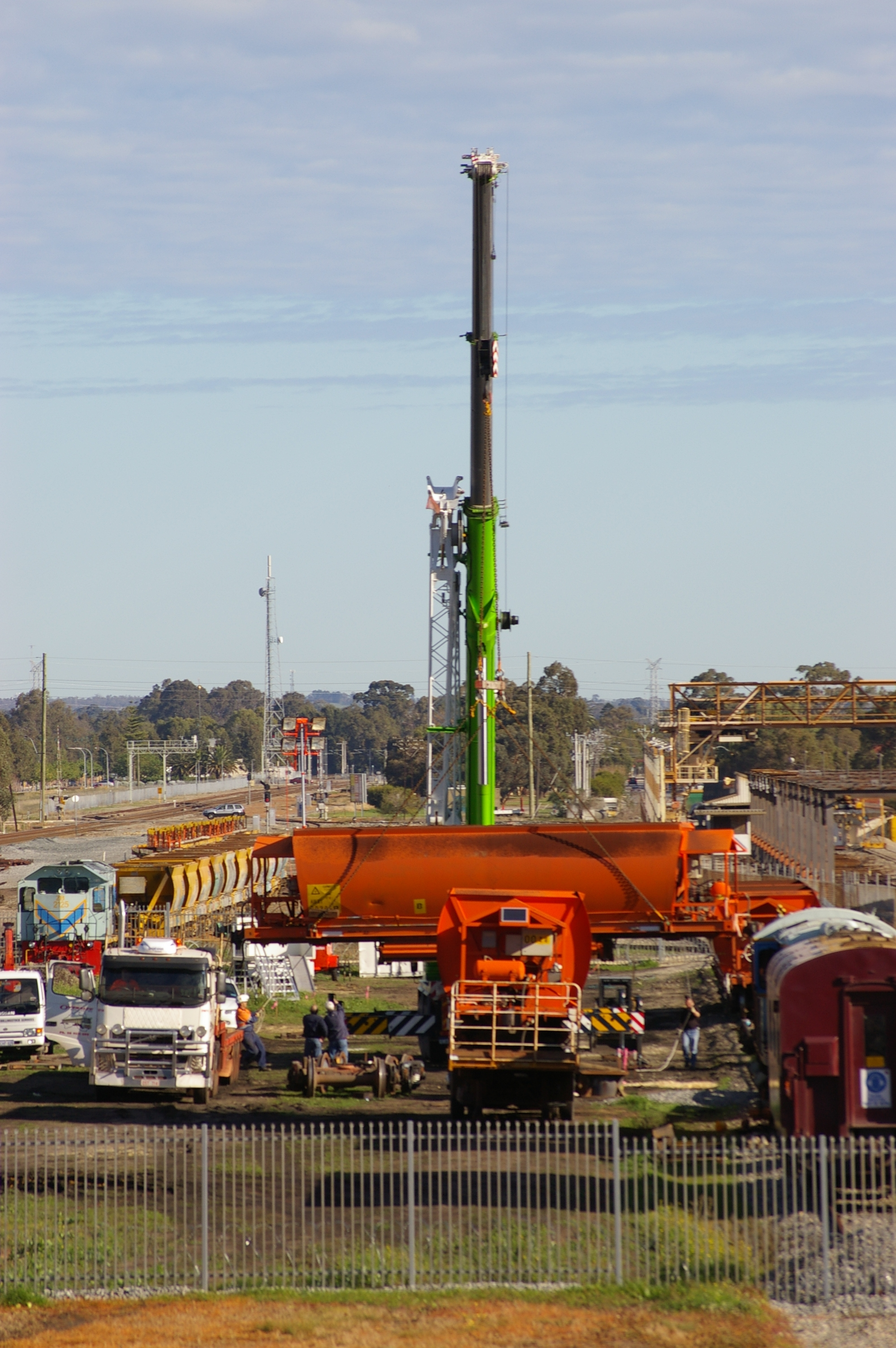
Delivery of rolling stock to South Spur Rail Services' yard in Midland in July 2007

South Spur Rail Services was a Western Australian owned railway company that provides terminal operations and short haul rail services. In February 2006, it purchased Silverton Rail. In March 2007, it was sold to Coote Industrial, then in March 2010 to P&O Trans Australia, which in turn was acquired by Qube Holdings.

== History ==
South Spur Rail Services was formed in January 1997 by James Wilson and his three brothers.

It won a number of contracts for hauling infrastructure trains. In Perth, it also provided hook-and-pull services for Pacific National's SeaTrain service between Kewdale Freight Terminal and Fremantle Port. In the construction of the Perth to Mandurah railway, South Spur Rail Services diesels hauled track and sleepers over the Mount Henry Bridge as far as South Perth.

By 2004, it had commenced operating infrastructure trains in New South Wales. In 2006, it commenced operating a service from Parkes to Perth for SCT Logistics using Silverton Rail C class locomotives.

Until 2008, South Spur Rail Services also operated a Restaurant Train service called the Spirit of the West, using K class locomotive K205 and a number of standard gauge coaches including two hired from Rail Heritage WA.

The company acquired New South Wales railway freight company Silverton Rail in 2006 and renamed it Southern & Silverton Rail, with this subsidiary operating South Spur Rail Services services in New South Wales. In March 2007, the company was sold to Coote Industrial. In May 2010, Coote Industrial sold South Spur Rail Services to P&O Trans Australia. P&O was in turn was acquired by Qube Holdings.

== Fleet ==
- Mount Goldsworthy A class: A3, A5, A7, A8
- Midland Railway of Western Australia F class: F40
- K class: K203, K205, K206, K210
- KA class: KA212
- N class: NA1874
- R Class: R1902
- ZB class: ZB2120, ZB2125, ZB2129
- 600 class: 602, 603, 607
