= WAGR K class =

Class of Australian 2-8-4T locomotives

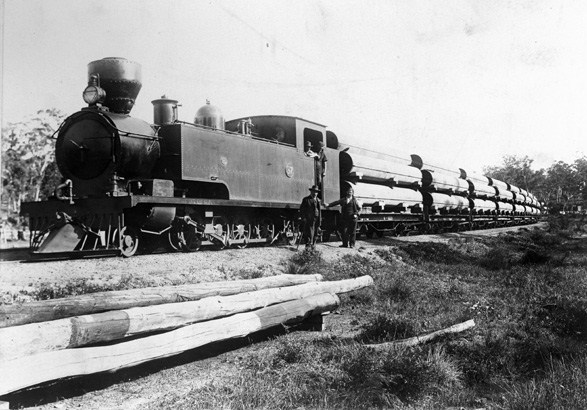
- K class with a Goldfields Water Supply Scheme pipe train, ca. 1902
Type and origin
- Power type: Steam
- Builder: Neilson & Co
- Serial number: 4599-4606, 5040-5045, 5197-5206
- Total produced: 24
Specifications
- Configuration
  - Whyte: 2-8-4T
- Gauge: 3 ft 6 in (1,067 mm)
- Fuel type: Coal
- Fuel capacity: 2.75 long tons 0 cwt (6,200 lb or 2.8 t)
- Water cap.: 2,000 imp gal (9,100 L; 2,400 US gal)
- Boiler pressure: As built: 120 lbf/in^{2} (0.83 MPa); Reboilered: 160 lbf/in^{2} (1.10 MPa)
- Heating surface
  - Firebox: 16.7 sq ft (1.55 m^{2})
- Cylinder size: 17 in × 21 in (432 mm × 533 mm)
Performance figures
- Power output: As built: 15,332 lbf (68.20 kN); Reboilered: 20,443 lbf (90.93 kN)
- Factor of adh.: 3.8
Career
- Operators: Western Australian Government Railways
- Numbers: K34-K41, K101-K106, K186-K195
- First run: 1893
- Disposition: All scrapped

The K-class was a class of 2-8-4T steam locomotives of the Western Australian Government Railways

== History ==
Between October 1893 and August 1898, the WAGR took delivery of 24 K class locomotives from Neilson & Co. They entered service on the Eastern Railway between Midland Junction and Northam. In 1902, they were displaced from this work by the F class. They then mainly operated freight services on the Collie line and within Perth, although they did operate Royal Perth Show and raceday special passenger services.

In 1915, two were repowered with superheated boilers. A further three followed, but all were converted back by 1937. Further reboilerings increased tractive effort by over 5,100 lbf (22.69 kN).

Six examples originally intended for the WAGR were purchased by the British Government and sent to South Africa to ease a shortage encountered by the Imperial Military Railways resulting from the Boer War, where they became the C class.

== Class lists ==
The numbers and periods in service of each member of the K class were as follows:

First and second batches, built by Neilson & Co, 1893 and 1896:
Builder's number	Year built	Road number	In service	Withdrawn	Notes
4599	1893	34	24 October 1893	22 March 1961	Converted to Ks, 23 March 1929, and back to K, 1 April 1937
4601	1893	35	25 October 1893	12 April 1951	
4600	1893	36	9 December 1893	25 October 1949	
4602	1893	37	10 November 1893	6 September 1962	
4603	1893	38	28 February 1894	1 June 1927	
4604	1893	39	7 March 1894	29 May 1953	Converted to Ks, 12 February 1916, and back to K, 3 October 1925
4605	1893	40	30 March 1894	1 August 1963	Stowed at Fremantle, 2 August 1961
4606	1893	41	16 April 1894	1 June 1927	
5040	1896	101	17 March 1897	24 August 1953	Converted to Ks, 20 November 1915, and back to K, 22 December 1928
5041	1896	102	20 March 1897	28 June 1955	
5042	1896	103	23 March 1897	15 October 1962	
5043	1896	104	30 March 1897	7 February 1928	Converted to Ks, 8 April 1916; scrapped as Ks
5044	1896	105	26 March 1897	23 November 1962	
5045	1896	106	31 March 1897	29 November 1957	

Third batch, built by Neilson, Reid & Co, 1898:
Builder's number	Year built	Road number	In service	Withdrawn	Notes
5197	1898	186	21 May 1898	30 July 1953	
5198	1898	187	26 May 1898	1 June 1927	
5199	1898	188	31 May 1898	1 June 1927	
			7 March 1928	15 May 1962	Returned to service after first withdrawal
5200	1898	189	5 June 1898	30 June 1926	
5201	1898	190	10 June 1898	7 December 1964	
5202	1898	191	4 August 1898	30 June 1926	
5203	1898	192	4 August 1898	1 June 1927	
5204	1898	193	12 August 1898	30 April 1954	
5205	1898	194	4 August 1898	13 January 1955	Converted to Ks, 25 December 1915, and back to K, 15 June 1929
5206	1898	195	23 July 1898	15 October 1962	Converted to Ks, 25 December 1915, and back to K, 25 June 1927

== Namesakes ==
The "K" designation was previously used by the K class of 1891, which in turn were reclassified as the L class. It was reused in the 1960s when the K class diesel locomotives entered service.

== See also ==
- Rail transport in Western Australia
- List of Western Australian locomotive classes
