= Engenco =

Engenco Limited
- Company type: Public
- Traded as: ASX: EGN
- Industry: Industrial engineering
- Founded: 1989
- Founder: Michael Coote
- Headquarters: Perth, Australia
- Area served: Worldwide
- Key people: Dale Ephinstone (Chairman & majority shareholder); Vincent De Santis (Director & large minority shareholder); Kevin Pallas (Managing Director & CEO)
- Revenue: ▼ A$133.8 million (2015)
- Operating income: ▼ (A$30.1 million) (2015)
- Net income: ▼ (A$32.7 million) (2015)
- Total assets: ▼ A$89.6 million (2015)
- Total equity: ▼ A$44.9 million (2015)
- Number of employees: >500
- Divisions: Power & Propulsion; Rail & Road
- Subsidiaries: CERT; Convair; Drivetrain; Gemco Rail; Greentrains; Momentum
- Website: www.engenco.com.au

Engenco Limited is an Australian engineering company with operations in Australia, Asia, Europe and America. It is listed on the Australian Stock Exchange.

== History ==
Engenco was founded as Global Turbocharger Specialists Australia by Michael Coote in 1989 providing diesel engine spare parts. It was renamed GTSA Engineering and later Coote Industrial.

In December 2006 Coote Industrial was listed on the Australian Stock Exchange. In November 2010 Coote Industrial was renamed Engenco.

== Subsidiaries ==
As at June 2015 its subsidiaries were:

- Centre for Excellence in Rail Training (CERT)
- Convair Engineering (Convair)
- Drivetrain Power and Propulsion (Drivetrain)
- Gemco Rail
- Greentrains
- Momentum

Previous subsidiaries include:

- South Spur Rail Services
- Southern & Silverton Rail

== Takeover offer ==
In December 2012 chairman Dale Elphinstone, who was the largest shareholder with a 37.6% stake, made a takeover offer for all the shares in the company. The takeover offer was unsuccessful with Elphinstone only having taken his shareholding up to 65.1% when the offer closed.
