= Greentrains =

- Industry: Rail transport
- Founded: June 2008
- Headquarters: Perth Western Australia, Australia
- Services: Rolling stock leasing
- Operating income: $6.8m (June 2015)
- Net income: $4.3m (June 2015)
- Parent: Engenco (ASX: EGN) 81%
- Website: www.engenco.com.au

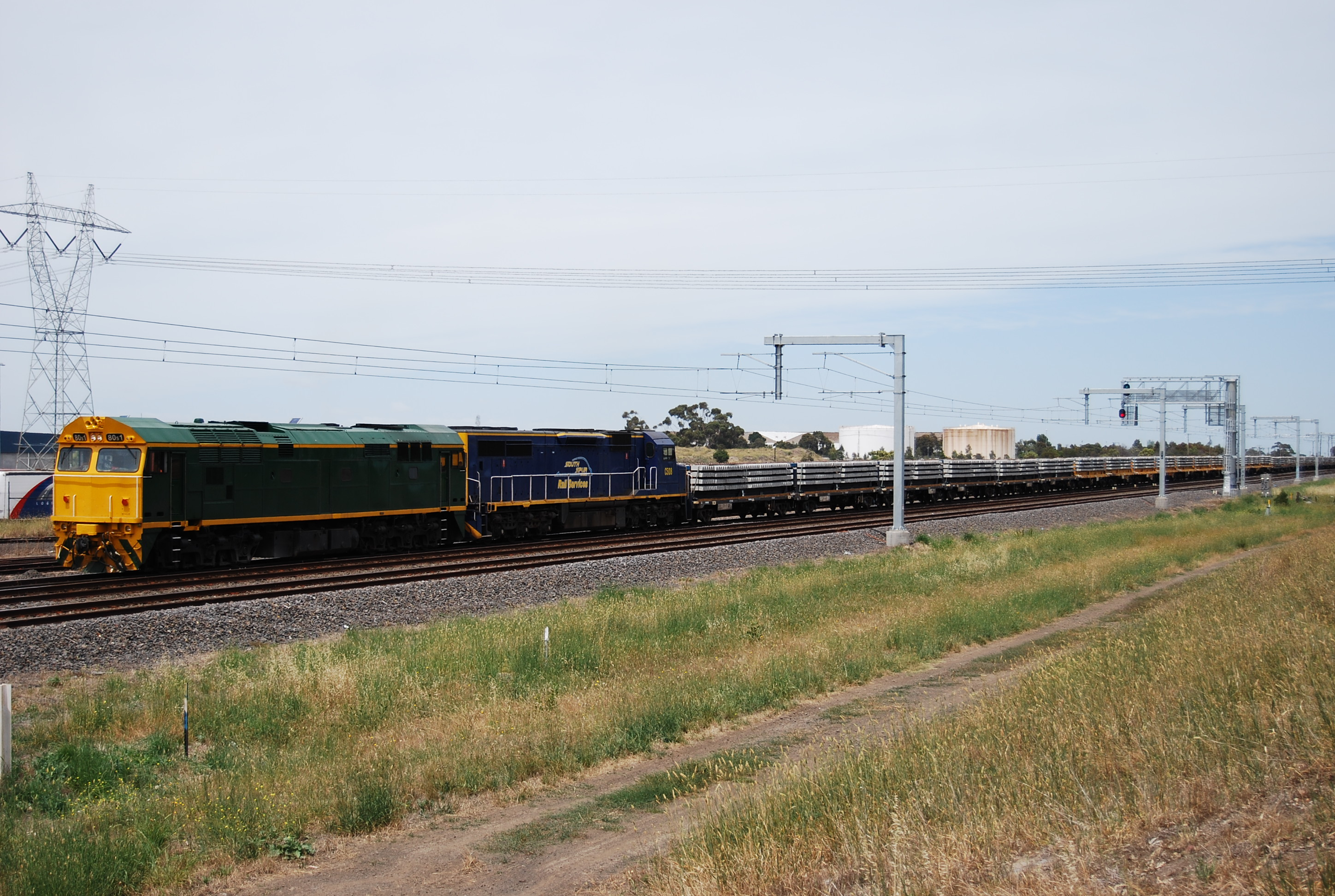
Greentrains 80 class at Somerton in January 2009

Greentrains was a locomotive and rolling stock leasing company in Australia. It was formed in June 2008 as a subsidiary of Coote Industrial.

In 2008, Coote Industrial subsidiary Gemco Rail acquired 42 locomotives and 54 wagons from the distressed Allco Finance Group that were being leased by Coote subsidiaries South Spur Rail Services and Southern & Silverton Rail. After refurbishment it was planned to sell them to Greentrains who in turn would lease them back South Spur and Southern & Silverton.

However, Greentrains ran into trouble raising funds to complete the deal and by June 2010, Coote Industrial had converted its debt to equity giving it an 81% shareholding.

As of January 2013, Greentrains owned 38 locomotives and 39 wagons. In April 2016, the majority of the locomotives were sold to Southern Shorthaul Railroad. Greentrains then ceased rail leasing.
