= South Australian Railways K class (broad gauge) =

South Australian Railways broad-gauge steam locomotives

South Australian Railways K class (broad gauge version)
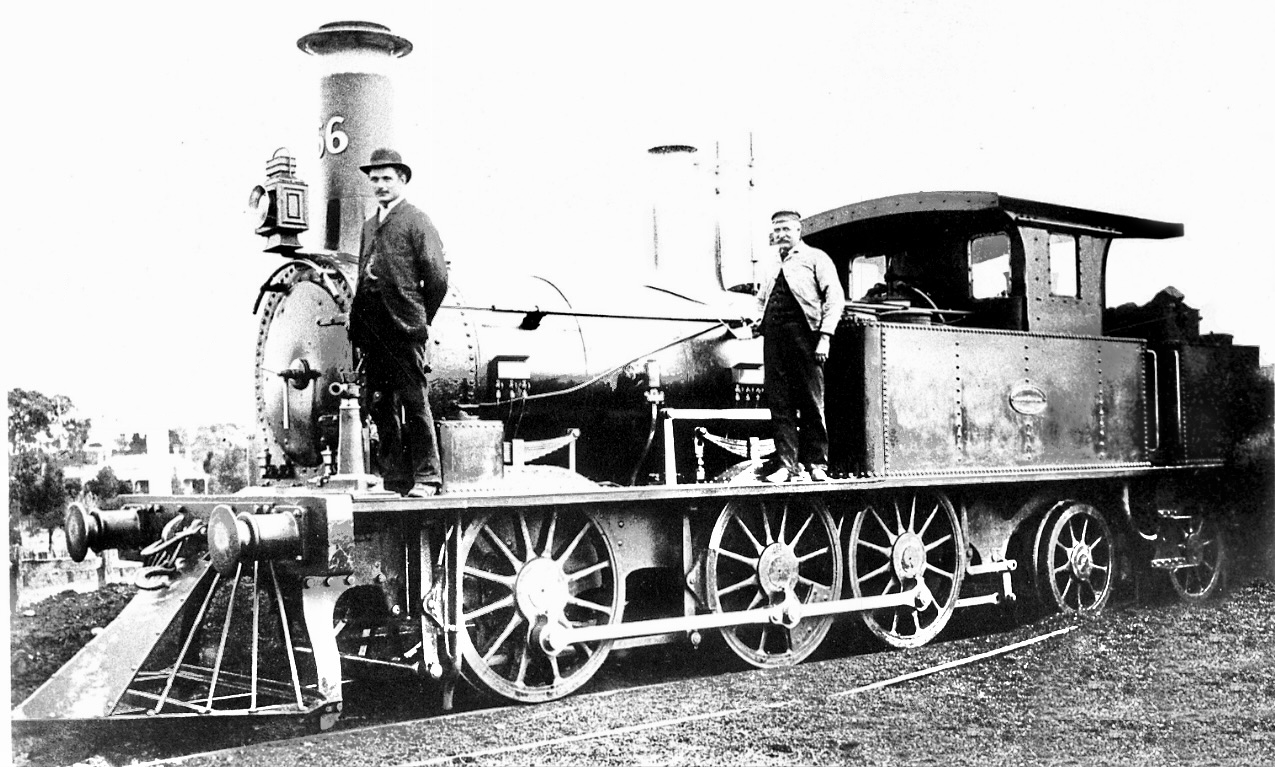
- South Australian Railways K class no. 66 soon after delivery
Type and origin
- Power type: Steam
- Designer: William Thow
- Builder: Beyer, Peacock and Company
- Build date: 1878–1884
- Total produced: 18
- Rebuilder: Islington Workshops
- Rebuild date: 1889–1914
- Number rebuilt: 13
Specifications
- Configuration
  - Whyte: 0-6-4T
  - UIC: C2' T
- Gauge: 5 ft 3 in (1600 mm)
- Driver dia.: 4 ft 0 in (1219 mm)
- Trailing dia.: 3 ft 0 in (914 mm)
- Wheelbase: 10 ft 3 in (3124 mm)
  - Axle spacing (Asymmetrical): 6 ft 0 in (1829 mm) + 4 ft 3 in (1295 mm)
- Length
  - Over beams: 30 ft 0 in (9144 mm)
- Width: 8 ft 6 in (2591 mm)
- Height: 12 ft 7 in (3835 mm)
- Axle load: 24 long tons 14 cwt (55,300 lb or 25.1 t)
  - 1st coupled: 8 long tons 0 cwt (17,900 lb or 8.1 t)
  - 2nd coupled: 8 long tons 7 cwt (18,700 lb or 8.5 t)
  - 3rd coupled: 8 long tons 7 cwt (18,700 lb or 8.5 t)
  - Trailing: 14 long tons 1 cwt (31,500 lb or 14.3 t)
- Adhesive weight: 24 long tons 14 cwt (55,300 lb or 25.1 t)
- Loco weight: 42 long tons 19 cwt (96,200 lb or 43.6 t)
- Fuel type: Coal
- Fuel capacity: 1 long ton 18 cwt (4,300 lb or 1.9 t)
- Water cap.: 1,060 imp gal (1,270 US gal; 4,800 L)
- Firebox
  - Type: Round-top
  - Grate area: 15 sq ft (1.4 m^{2})
- Boiler
  - Type: Round-top
  - Pitch: 6 ft 0 in (1829 mm)
- Boiler pressure: 130 psi (900 kPa)
- Safety valve: Salter spring balance later, Ramsbottom
- Heating surface
  - Firebox: 89.4 sq ft (8.31 m^{2})
  - Tubes: 830.8 sq ft (77.18 m^{2})
- Cylinders: 2
- Cylinder size: 16 1/2 in × 20 in (419 mm × 508 mm)
- Valve gear: Inside
Performance figures
- Tractive effort: 12,535 lbf (55.76 kN)
Career
- Operators: South Australian Railways
- Class: K (broad gauge)
- Number in class: 18
- Numbers: 34–37, 42, 57–69
- First run: 22 February 1879
- Withdrawn: 1936-1956
- Disposition: All scrapped

Eighteen South Australian Railways K class (broad-gauge) locomotives were built by Beyer, Peacock and Company for the South Australian Railways (SAR) between 1878 and 1884. They had a fundamental design flaw that affected their original role as light-line passenger locomotives, relegating them eventually to shunting duties exclusively. They operated for six decades.

== Need ==
At a time of fierce competition between the Australian colonies, a railway line was extended from Kapunda to Morgan (Note: Then known as North West Bend.) on the River Murray, opening in 1878. The link allowed goods brought downstream on riverboats from New South Wales and Victoria to reach Port Adelaide for export more quickly and safely than by continuing on the river to the sea, since Morgan was only 160 km (99 mi) by rail to Adelaide but 306 km (190 mi) to the mouth of the river. Until the spread of other railway lines cut out most of the river traffic, the South Australian Railways operated as many as six goods trains in each direction every day on the Morgan line.

William Thow, the Locomotive Engineer of the SAR, designed a 0-6-4 tank locomotive to handle traffic on the new line's lightly laid track. Four were delivered in 1879 from the UK manufacturer Beyer, Peacock and Company. At that time they were the most powerful locos on the SAR, with the exception of two 0-6-0 J class locomotives.

== Shortcomings ==
The new locomotives experienced mechanical failures (broken crank axles, fracturing of gunmetal axleboxes and excessive tyre wear on the leading driving wheels) and after a year were moved to hauling goods and mixed trains other North Lines and the Port Adelaide line.

A major design weakness was the lack of a leading bogie ("pilot truck"), which led to frequent derailments, especially on the Adelaide Hills line, with its sharp curves, difficult gradients, and uncompensated track. A partial solution was to run the locomotives in reverse – i.e., with cab leading – so that the rear bogie led, providing guidance for the driving wheels. When that mode of operation predominated, the pilot ("cowcatcher") was moved to the bogie end. In their final role as shunting locomotives, the pilot was removed as a safety measure, since its presence made coupling and uncoupling difficult.

== Deployment ==
Despite their shortcomings, the locomotive superintendent considered them a good design and concluded that the main problem was in the track. Fourteen more locos were ordered during the next five years. Running numbers for the 18 were allocated with gaps: starting with no. 34, their numbers spanned a range of 36. In a most unusual development, Thow designed a narrow gauge version of the class, the sole representative of which was delivered in 1884. It was allocated number 52, i.e. within that number range, and also classified as K class, despite the different gauge and being lighter and noticeably smaller in many respects – including the driving wheels, which at 3 ft 6 in (1067 mm) diameter were 6 in (152 mm) smaller than those of the broad-gauge K locomotives.

The initial mechanical failures were overcome and the locomotives were soon deployed on the 12 km (7.5 mi) Port Adelaide line, where they would haul loads up to 550 long tons (620 short tons; 560 t). When they worked on longer country lines, such as to Terowie, 225 km (140 mi) from Adelaide, where goods were transferred to the narrow gauge, a supplementary water tank wagon was attached. The downside was that the locomotives then had to work funnel-first because the only connection for the water was through a fitting attached to the rear of the engine.

Soon they could be seen again on the Morgan Line. One or two were lent or sold to contractors to help build the Hills line, but were quickly exchanged for machines that would reliably stay on the hills track. After some time with restrictions on where they could work, from about 1917 they were allowed on every broad-gauge line on the system. They occasionally worked trains on the Hills (or "South") line, but after the advent of the Q class, few saw service in the hills. When the SAR acquired the Glenelg Railway Company in 1899, the K class worked on the South Terrace (Adelaide) to Glenelg service. Nearer the end of their working lives, some were stationed at Port Adelaide for freight working in the area.

Lightly constructed lines to which the locomotives were suited were the Milang railway line and, especially in the 1920s, the Murraylands lines radiating from Tailem Bend. In the latter case the K class worked out of the Murray Bridge depot, and later the large depot at Tailem Bend; light servicing was carried out at both depots.

== Modifications ==
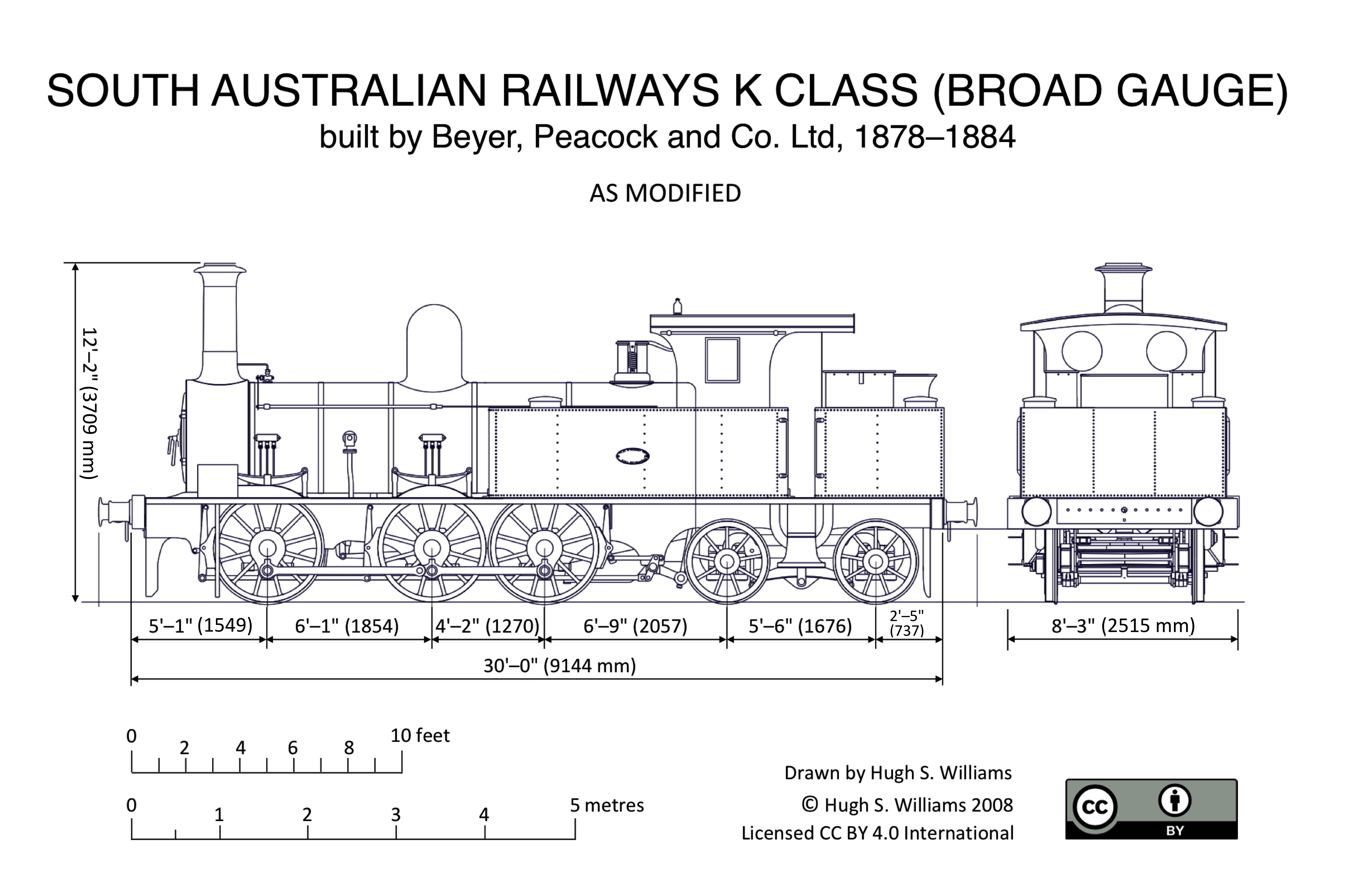
The broad-gauge K class in its later form. See also: version as delivered.

During their six decades of service, the locomotives received a number of modifications, including rebuilds between 1893 and 1903. Changes were made to the cab roof and capacity of the coal bunkers; Ramsbottom safety valves replaced Salter type; and Westinghouse brakes were fitted. None appears to have been fitted with a steam generator or electric light.

== End ==
The service of this ultimately quite useful class of tank locomotive came to an end about 1936 after the larger and more powerful locomotives of Commissioner William Webb arrived in the late 1920s, freeing up medium-sized locos for lighter duties. However, cutting up did not follow immediately, and one was sold in 1940 to the Australian Paper Manufacturers factory at Maryvale, Victoria. The SAR also retained one for shunting at various places in the Adelaide conurbation, including Islington Workshops. During the Second World War, three others were restored for similar service as an emergency measure. All four locomotives were cut up in 1956.

== Gallery ==
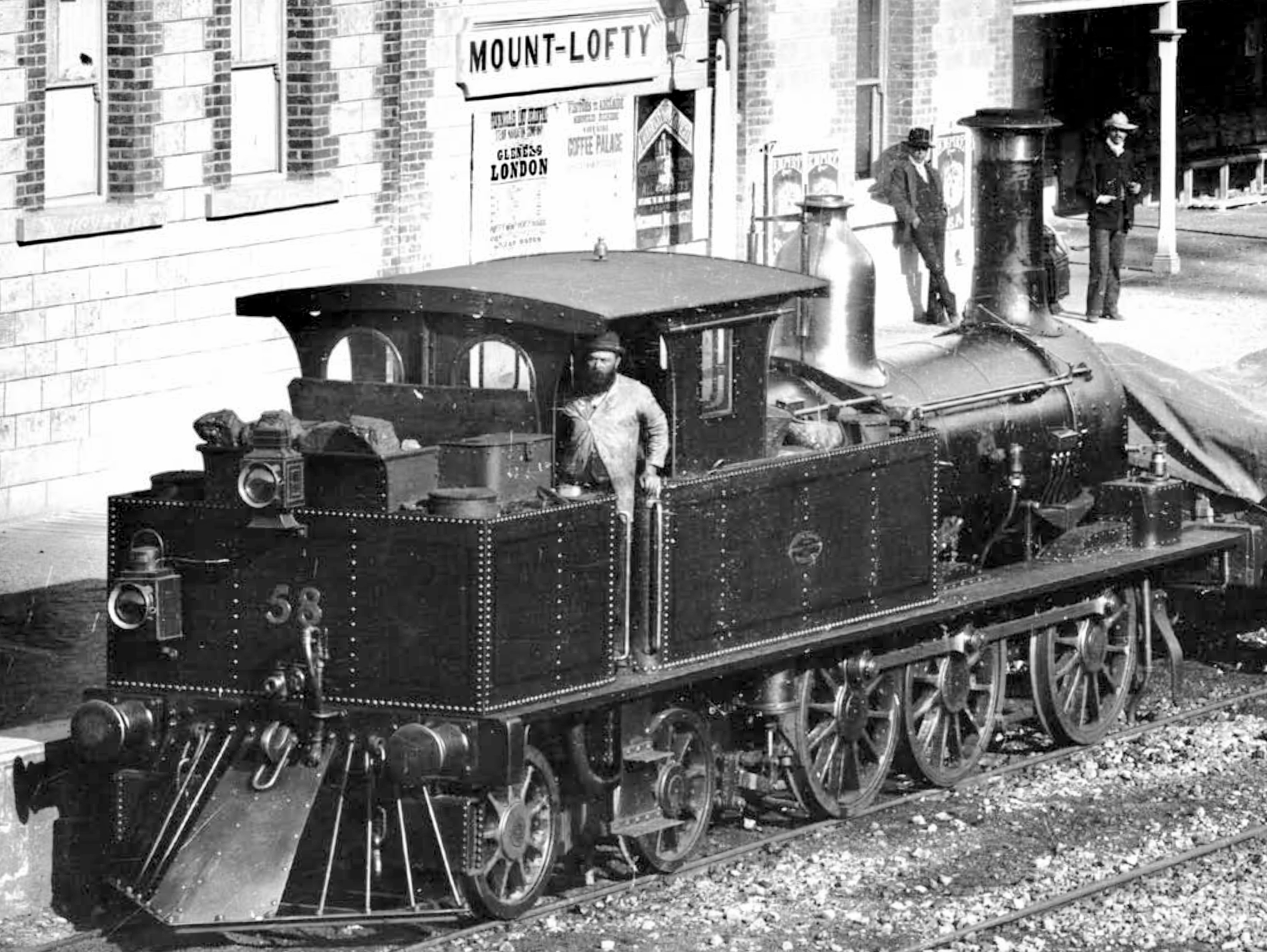

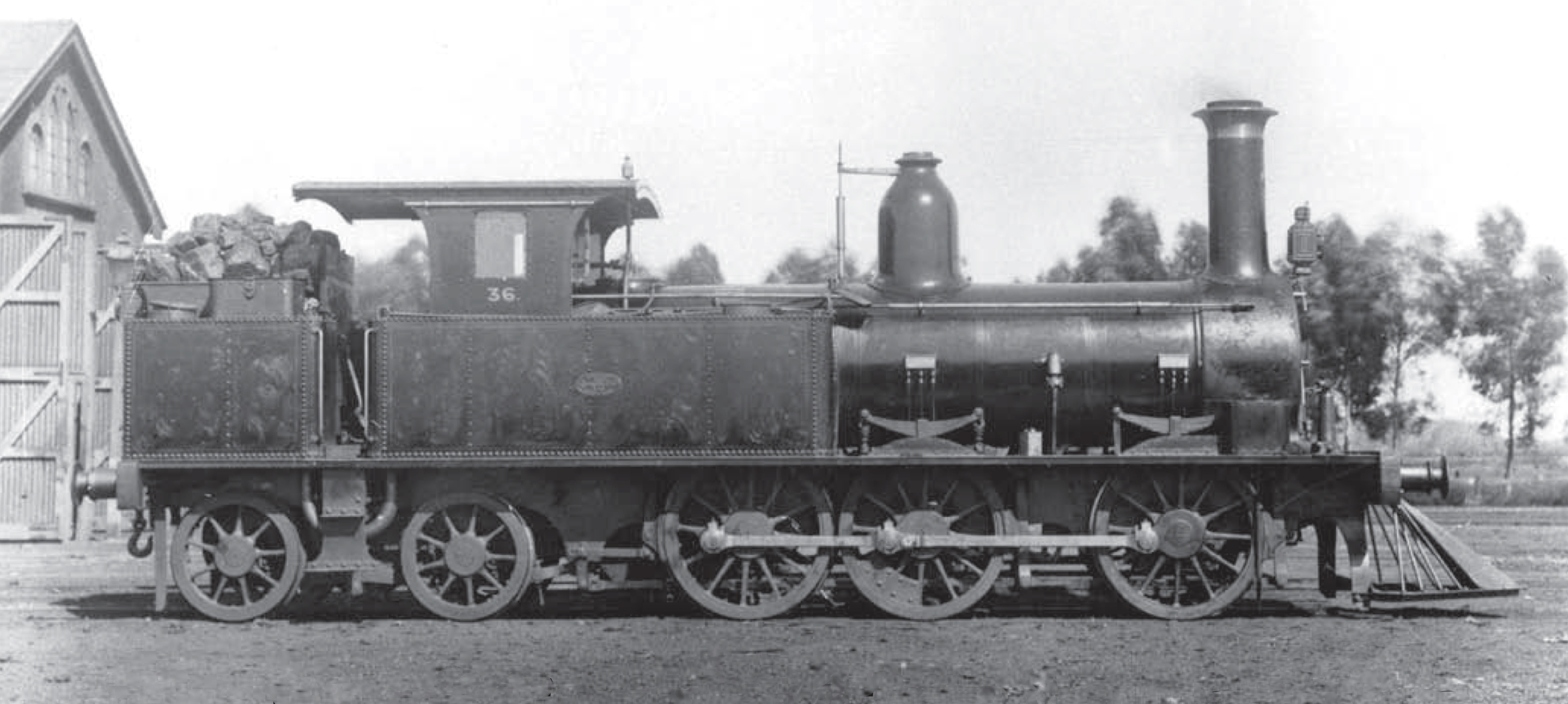

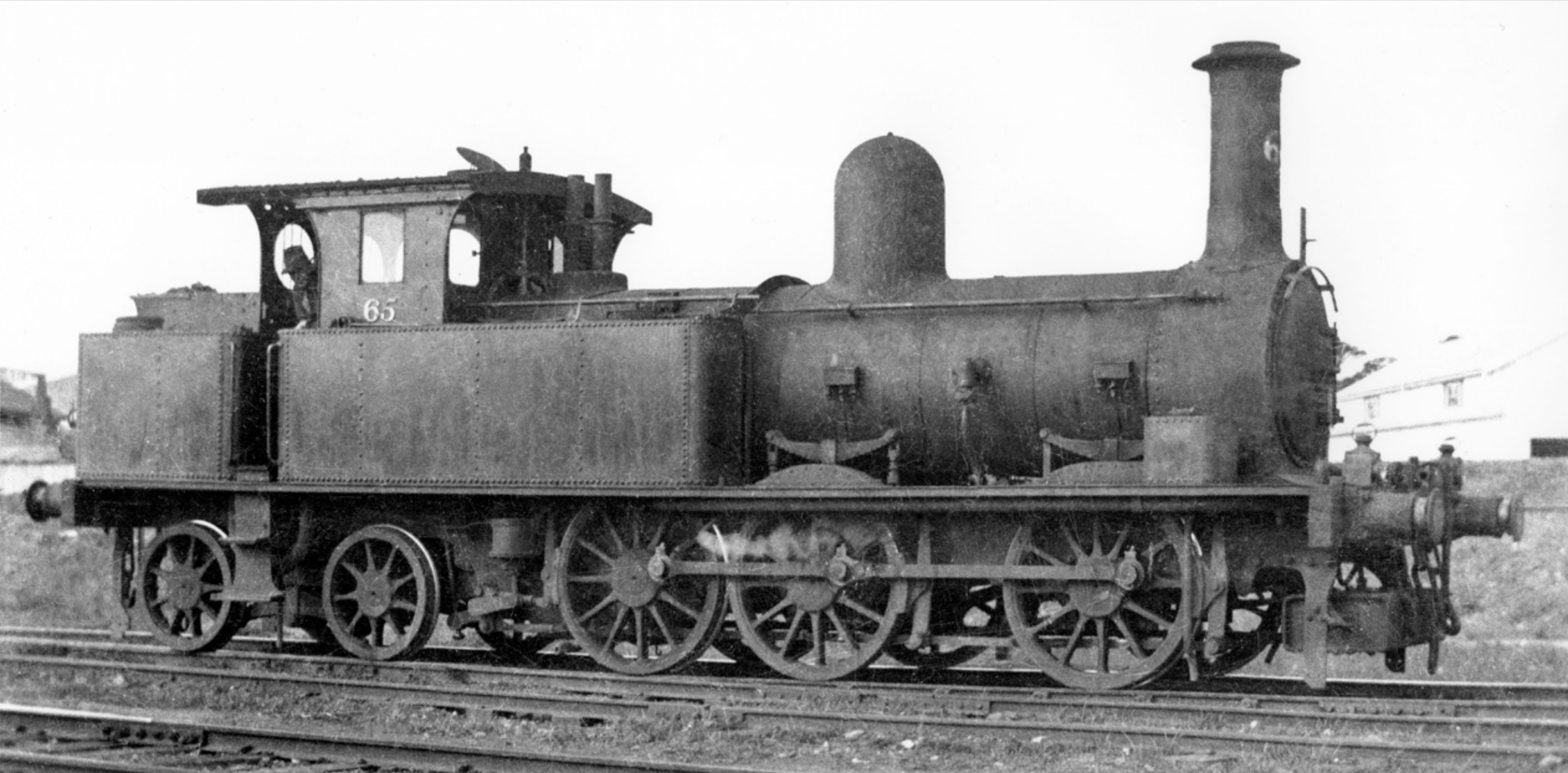

A few years after delivery, with its brass dome polished, no. 58 waits at Mount Lofty. Already the locomotive has been configured to run habitually in reverse, with pilot (cowcatcher) at the bogie end and a protective rear spectacle plate added to the cab.

Unmodified no. 36 at Islington Workshops running shed about 1890 in as-delivered configuration, including original open cab, Salter safety valves, brass steam dome painted over, and pilot at the front.

No. 65 on shunting duties, probably in the decade before buckeye couplers became standard on the SAR about 1935 – it retains hook-and-chain couplings. Pilot removed for shunters' safety, Westinghouse brake and Ramsbottom safety valves fitted, but no electric lighting.
