= South Australian Railways K class (narrow gauge) =

Former South Australian narrow-gauge steam locomotive

South Australian Railways K class (narrow-gauge version)
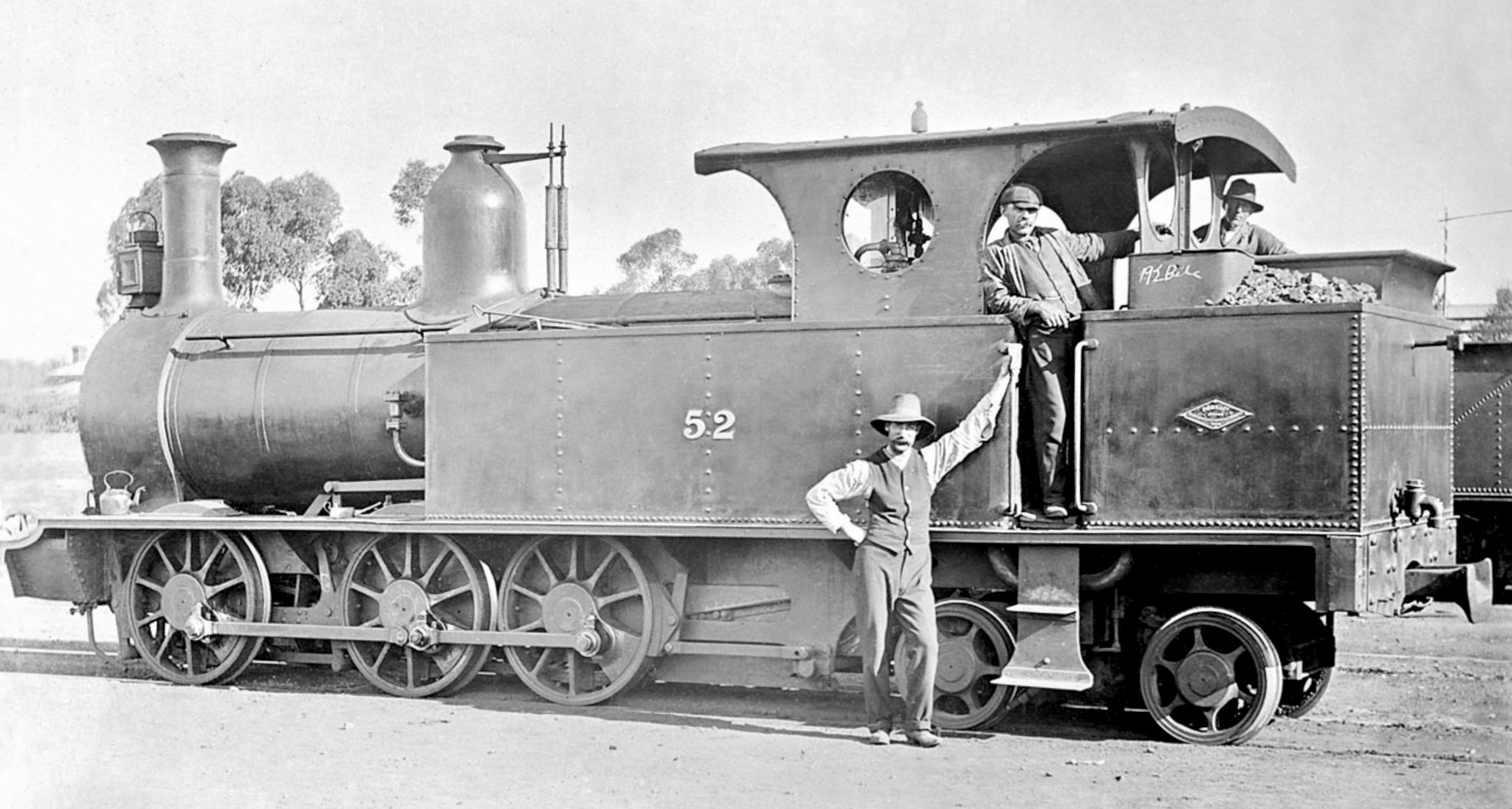
- Sole representative of its class on the narrow gauge, South Australian Railways K class no. 52 at Peterborough
Type and origin
- Power type: Steam
- Designer: William Thow
- Builder: Dübs and Company
- Build date: 1883
- Total produced: 1
Specifications
- Configuration
  - Whyte: 0-6-4T
  - UIC: C2' T
- Gauge: 3 ft 6 in (1067 mm)
- Driver dia.: 3 ft 6 in (1067 mm)
- Trailing dia.: 2 ft 3 in (686 mm)
- Wheelbase: 9 ft 0 in (2743 mm)
  - Axle spacing (Asymmetrical): 5 ft 4 1/2 in (1638 mm) + 3 ft 7 1/2 in (1105 mm)
- Length
  - Over beams: 28 ft 3 in (8611 mm)
- Height: 11 ft 6 in (3505 mm)
- Axle load: 20 long tons 0 cwt (44,800 lb or 20.3 t)
  - 1st coupled: 6 long tons 11 cwt (14,700 lb or 6.7 t)
  - 2nd coupled: 6 long tons 16.8 cwt (15,300 lb or 6.9 t)
  - 3rd coupled: 6 long tons 16.8 cwt (15,300 lb or 6.9 t)
  - Trailing: 11 long tons 0 cwt (24,600 lb or 11.2 t)
- Loco weight: 32 long tons 12 cwt (73,000 lb or 33.1 t)
- Fuel type: Coal
- Fuel capacity: 1 long ton 2 cwt 3 qr (2,550 lb or 1.16 t)
- Water cap.: 940 imp gal (1130 US gal; 4300 L)
- Firebox
  - Type: Round-top
  - Grate area: 13.14 sq ft (1.221 m^{2})
- Boiler
  - Pitch: 5 ft 8 in (1730 mm)
- Boiler pressure: 130 psi (900 kPa)
- Safety valve: Salter spring balance, probably Ramsbottom later
- Heating surface
  - Firebox: 77.9 sq ft (7.24 m^{2})
  - Tubes: 699.5 sq ft (64.99 m^{2})
- Cylinders: 2
- Cylinder size: 14 1/2 in × 20 in (368 mm × 508 mm)
- Valve gear: Inside
Performance figures
- Tractive effort: 11,063 lbf (49.21 kN)
Career
- Operators: South Australian Railways
- Class: K (narrow gauge)
- Number in class: 1
- Numbers: 52
- First run: 25 January 1884
- Withdrawn: 24 May 1938
- Disposition: Scrapped

The South Australian Railways K class (narrow gauge) comprised a single locomotive. The design, by South Australian Railways Locomotive Engineer William Thow, was very similar to that of the broad-gauge K class, but it was smaller and lighter. It was allocated number 52 within the sequence allocated to the larger locomotives.

The locomotive was built in 1883, five years after the first broad-gauge K class locomotive and a year before the last of the 18 such locomotives entered service. No. 52 was built by Dübs and Company of Glasgow, whereas Beyer, Peacock and Company, of Manchester, built all the broad-gauge class.

The broad-gauge design was moderately "shrunk" to meet the smaller loading gauge of 3 ft 6 in (1067 mm) lines and the lower load-bearing capacity of track compared with the 5 ft 3 in (1600 mm) broad gauge. Some key specifications are compared in the table below.

Some differences between the two types of K class locomotives
Specification	Narrow-gauge K	Broad-gauge K	Narrow/ broad proportion
Length over buffer beams	28 ft 3 in (8611 mm)	30 ft 0 in (9144 mm)	94%
Driving wheels diameter	3 ft 6 in (1067 mm)	4 ft 0 in (1219 mm)	88%
Loco weight	32 long tons 12 cwt (73,000 lb or 33.1 t)	42 long tons 19 cwt (96,200 lb or 43.6 t)	76%
Heating surface (firebox + tubes)	699.5 sq ft (64.99 m^{2})	920.2 sq ft (85.49 m^{2})	76%
Tractive effort	11,063 lbf (49.21 kN)	12,535 lbf (55.76 kN)	88%

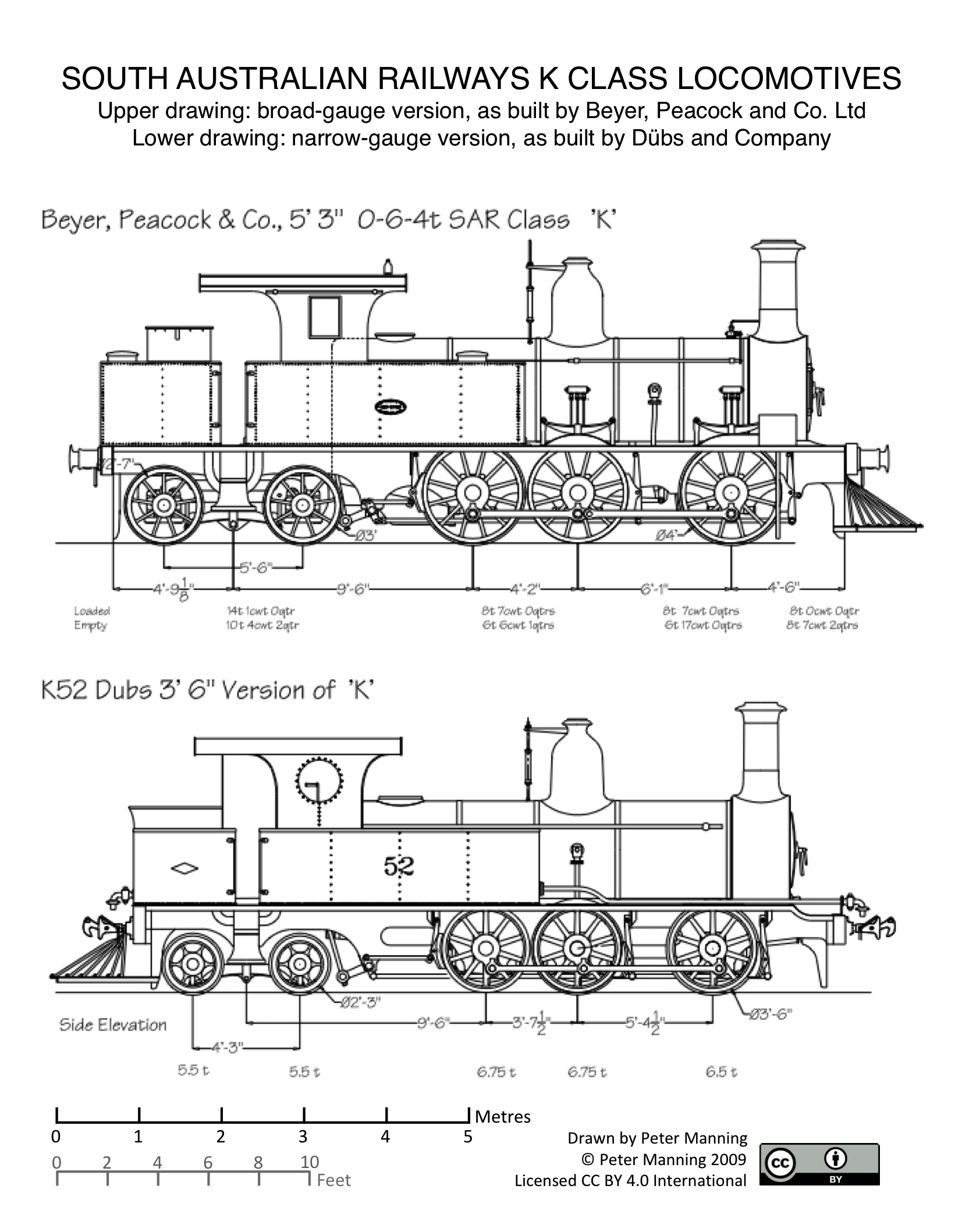
Broad and narrow gauge versions of the K class (click to enlarge)

A major design weakness of the broad-gauge K class was the lack of a leading bogie (pilot truck), which led to frequent derailments, especially on sharp curves and difficult gradients. A partial solution was to run the locomotives in reverse – i.e., with cab leading – so that the rear bogie led, providing guidance for the driving wheels. The extent to which the weakness affected no. 52 is not known, although the presence of a stopcock on both ends of the locomotive – to take water from a four-wheeled tank wagon on longer journeys – indicates that it was able to be operated both funnel-first and cab-first.

Little is known about the service life of the locomotive; it is believed to have spent most of its half-century existence at Peterborough as a shunting engine.
