= WAGR K class (diesel) =

Class of diesel locomotives

Western Australian Government Railways K Class
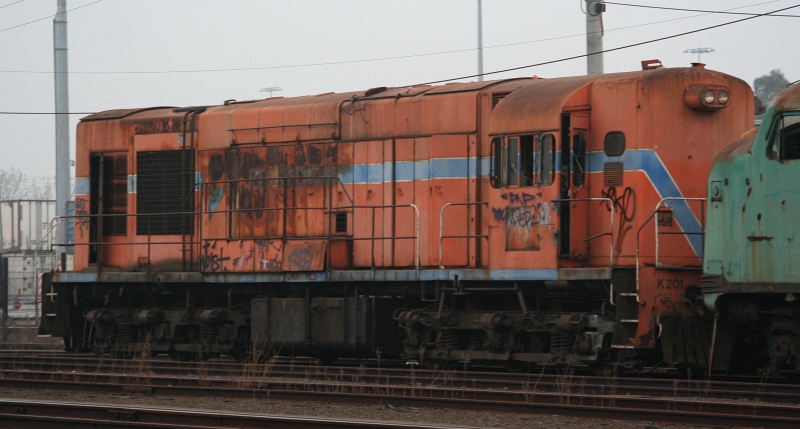
- K201 at South Dynon Locomotive Depot, June 2006
Type and origin
- Power type: Diesel-Electric
- Builder: English Electric, Rocklea
- Serial number: A.109-A.111, A.133-A.137, A.142, A.186
- Build date: 1966-1969
- Total produced: 10
Specifications
- Configuration
  - AAR: C-C
  - UIC: Co-Co
- Gauge: 1,435 mm (4 ft 8 1/2 in) standard gauge
- Wheel diameter: 40 inches (1.016 m)
- Minimum curve: 330 ft (100.6 m)
- Wheelbase: 13 ft 6 in (4.115 m) bogie
- Length: 55 ft (16.764 m) over headstocks
- Width: 9 ft 6 in (2.896 m)
- Height: 13 ft 8 in (4.166 m)
- Axle load: 18 long tons (18.3 t; 20.2 short tons)
- Loco weight: 108 long tons (109.7 t; 121.0 short tons)
- Fuel type: Diesel
- Fuel capacity: 1,500 imp gal (6,800 L)
- Prime mover: English Electric 12CSVT Mk II
- RPM range: 450 - 850 rpm
- Engine type: four stroke, four valves per cylinder
- Aspiration: turbocharged, intercooled
- Generator: EE 822/16J
- Traction motors: EE 538
- Cylinders: 12 Vee
- Cylinder size: 10 in × 12 in (254 mm × 305 mm)
- MU working: 110V, stepless electro-pneumatic throttle
- Loco brake: Air
- Train brakes: air
Performance figures
- Maximum speed: 80 miles per hour (130 km/h)
- Power output: 2,025 hp (1,510 kW) gross, 1,850 hp (1,380 kW) net
- Tractive effort
  - Continuous: 44,500 lbf (197.9 kN) at 10.5 mph (20 km/h)
Career
- Operators: Western Australian Government Railways, Westrail, Goldsworthy Mining Ltd, BlueScope Steel, South Spur Rail Services, SCT Logistics, Greentrains
- Number in class: 10
- Numbers: K201-K210
- First run: January 1966
- Current owner: Greentrains; SCT Logistics
- Disposition: All scrapped

The K class are a class of diesel locomotives built by English Electric, Rocklea for the Western Australian Government Railways between 1966 and 1969.

== History ==
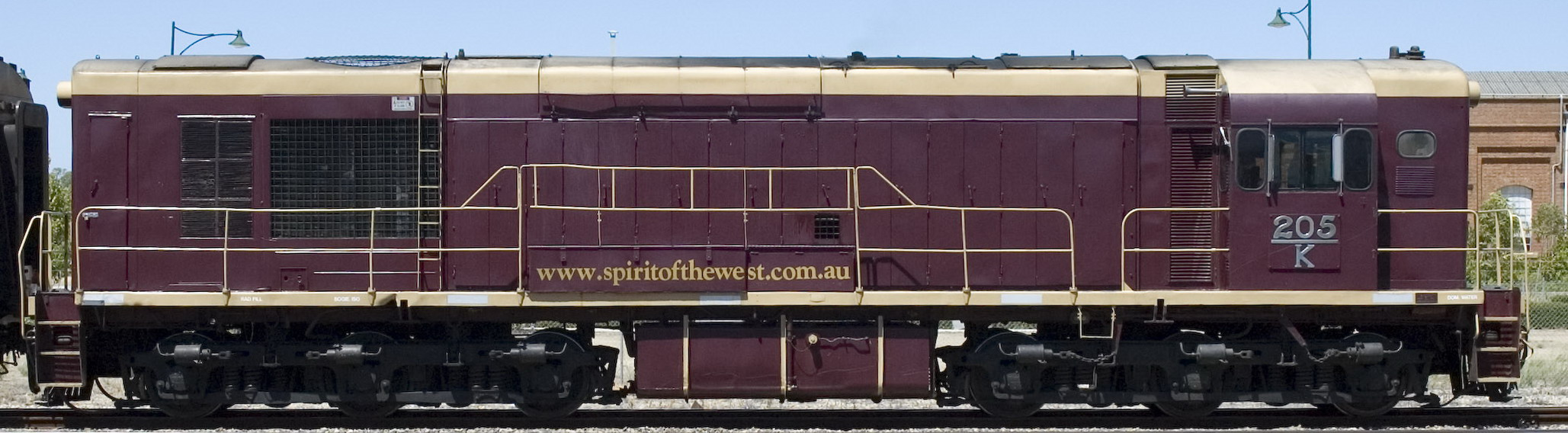
K205 in February 2006 painted in Spirit of the West livery

Nine K class were delivered in 1966/67 to operate services on the 657-kilometre (408 mi) Eastern Goldfields Railway from Perth to Kalgoorlie that was being converted to standard gauge. After initially working construction trains, in November 1966 they began working wheat trains from Merredin to Fremantle and once the full line was opened began working services to Kalgoorlie and Esperance.

In January 1966, K201 became the first locomotive to travel across Australia. It hauled freight trains from Brisbane to Melbourne, before being hauled for the rest of the journey. It passed through five states, travelled on six railway systems and required a change of bogies at Melbourne, Port Pirie and Kalgoorlie.

Goldsworthy Mining Ltd had purchased six similar locomotives, and after having one destroyed in an accident, purchased K202 with K210 ordered as a replacement. In July 1986 Goldsworth Mining purchased K203.

The Western Australian Government Railways also purchased 16 similar R class locomotives mounted on narrow gauge bogies. In 1974 three were fitted with standard gauge bogies and reclassified as the Ka class.

Four have been sold to SCT Logistics and three had gone to South Spur Rail Services by August 2000. The latter three are now owned by Greentrains and have been used as Broken Hill shunters as well as in Western Australia.

The two sold to Goldsworthy Mining were transferred to BHP's Port Kembla operation in November 1992.

== Status table ==
Key:	In Service	Withdrawn	Preserved	Converted	Scrapped

Serial number	Date delivered	Original Road number	Renumbered As	Name	Current/Last Owner	Status
A.109	7 February 1966	K201	-	-	SCT Logistics	Stored, Dynon
A.110	8 March 1966	K202	8, D50	-	Greentrains	Scrapped, Port Kembla (May 2002).
A.111	21 March 1966	K203	9, D51	-	Greentrains	Scrapped, Bellevue (20 June 2014)
A.134	13 October 1966	K204	-	-	Westrail	Scrapped, Midland Railway Workshops (24 October 1998)
A.135	25 October 1966	K205	-	-	Greentrains	Scrapped, Bellevue (20 June 2014)
A.133	8 December 1966	K206	-	-	Greentrains	Scrapped, Bellevue (27 June 2014)
A.136	19 December 1966	K207	-	-	SCT Logistics	Scrapped, Laverton, Victoria (August 2011)
A.137	31 December 1966	K208	-	Thomas Smith	SCT Logistics	Scrapped Forrestfield, (August 2026)
A.142	23 February 1967	K209	-	-	SCT Logistics	Stored, Dynon
A.186	27 March 1969	K210	-	-	Greentrains	Scrapped, Bellevue (3 July 2014)
