= Commonwealth Railways G class =

Class of Australian 4-6-0 locomotives

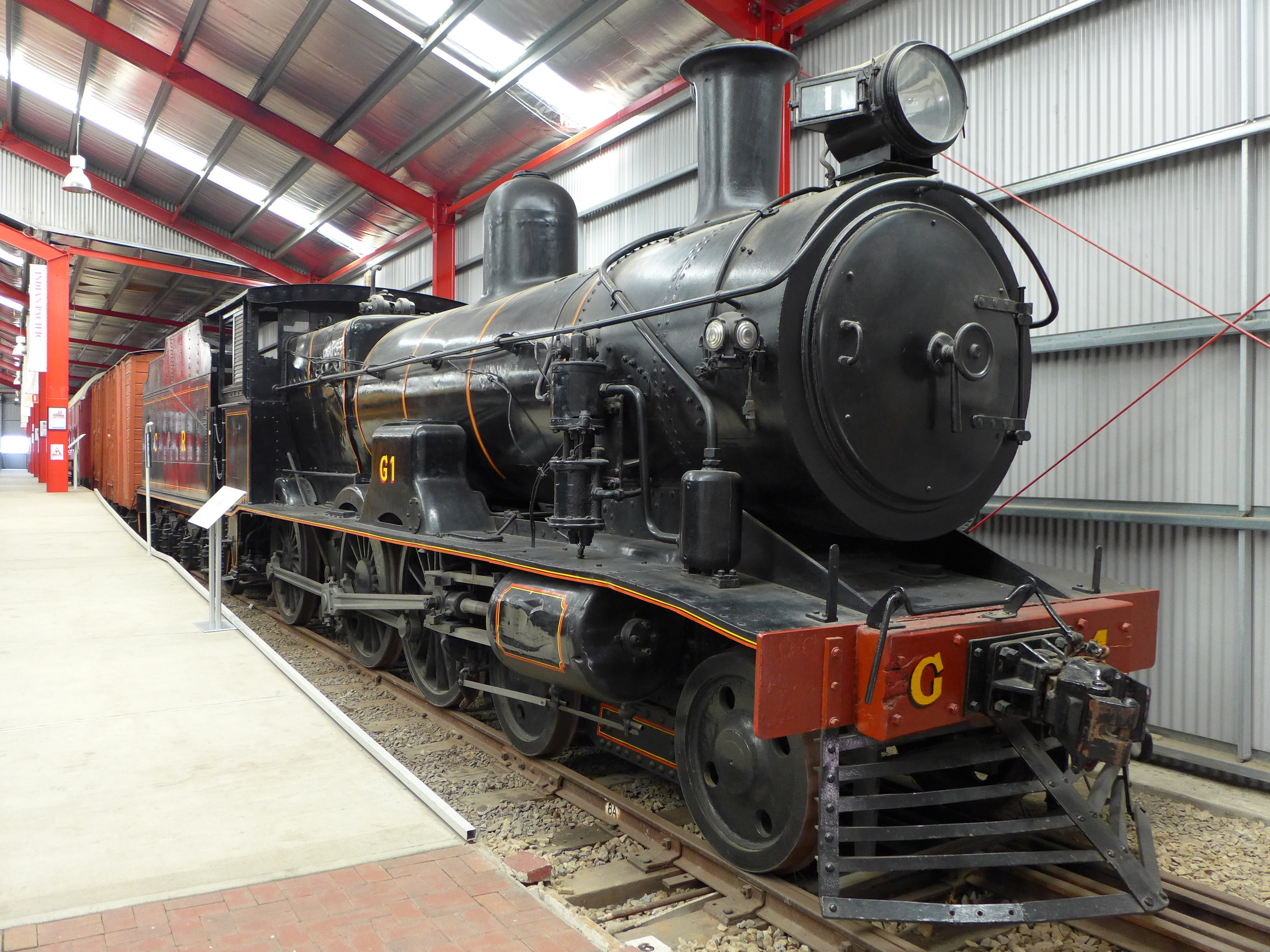
- A preserved G class locomotive at the National Railway Museum, Port Adelaide
Type and origin
- Power type: Steam
- Builder: Baldwin Locomotive Works (12); Clyde Engineering (4); Toowoomba Foundry (10)
- Build date: 1914-1917
- Total produced: 26
- Number rebuilt: 7
Specifications
- Configuration
  - Whyte: 4-6-0
- Gauge: 1,435 mm (4 ft 8 1/2 in) standard gauge
- Loco weight: 106 long tons (108 t; 119 short tons)
- Fuel type: Coal
- Water cap.: 4,850 imp gal (22,000 L; 5,820 US gal)
- Boiler pressure: 160 psi (11 bar; 1,100 kPa)
- Cylinder size: 20 in × 26 in (508 mm × 660 mm)
Performance figures
- Tractive effort: 22,187 lbf (98.69 kN)
Career
- Operators: Commonwealth Railways
- Numbers: G1-G26
- First run: March 1914
- Preserved: 1
- Current owner: National Railway Museum, Port Adelaide
- Disposition: 1 preserved, 25 scrapped

The Commonwealth Railways G class is a class of twenty-six 4-6-0 tender locomotives of the Commonwealth Railways, Australia. The class operated between Port Augusta (later, Port Pirie) and Kalgoorlie on the 1435 mm (4 ft 8 1/2 in) Trans-Australian Railway.

== History ==
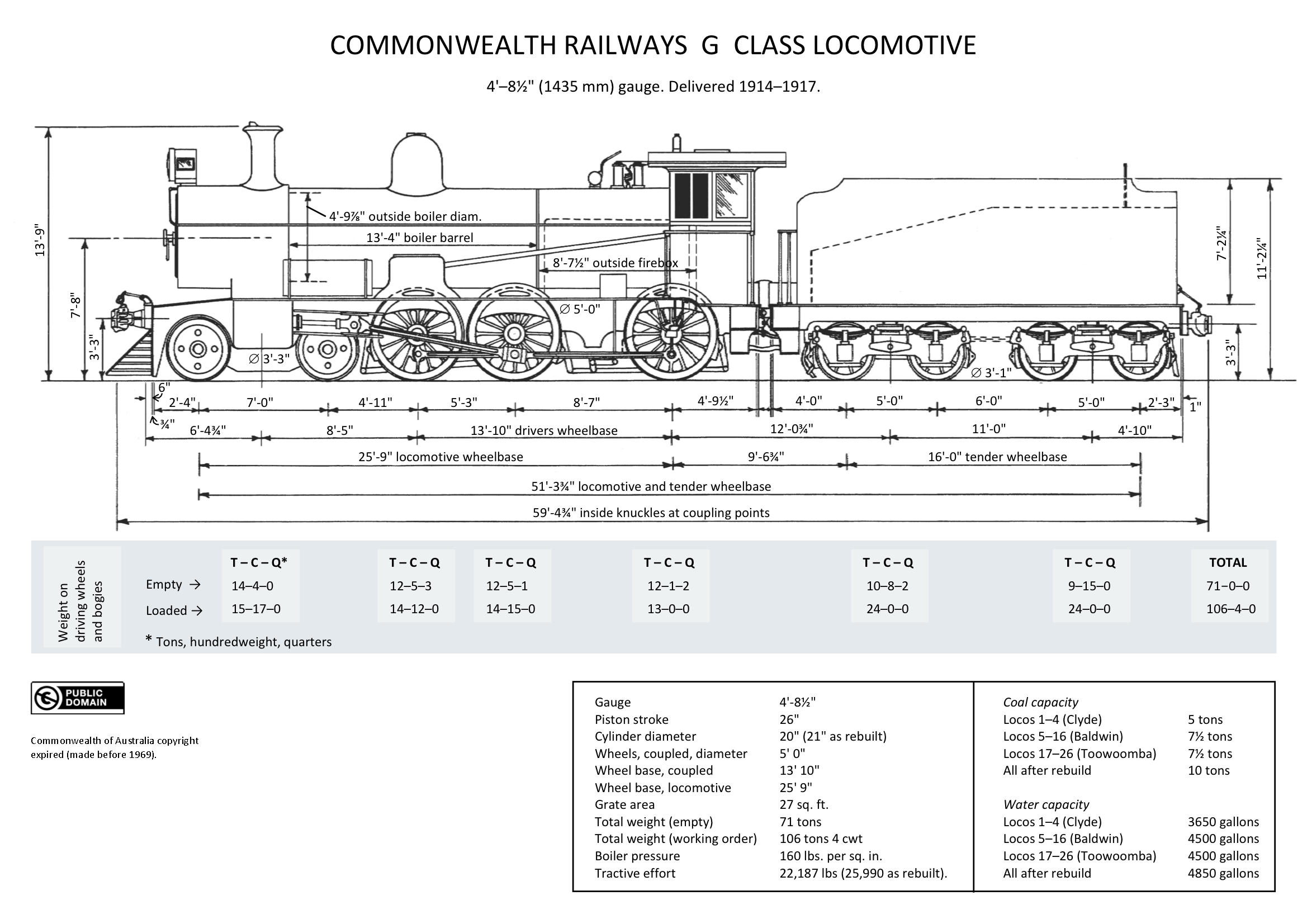
G class steam locomotive – side elevation

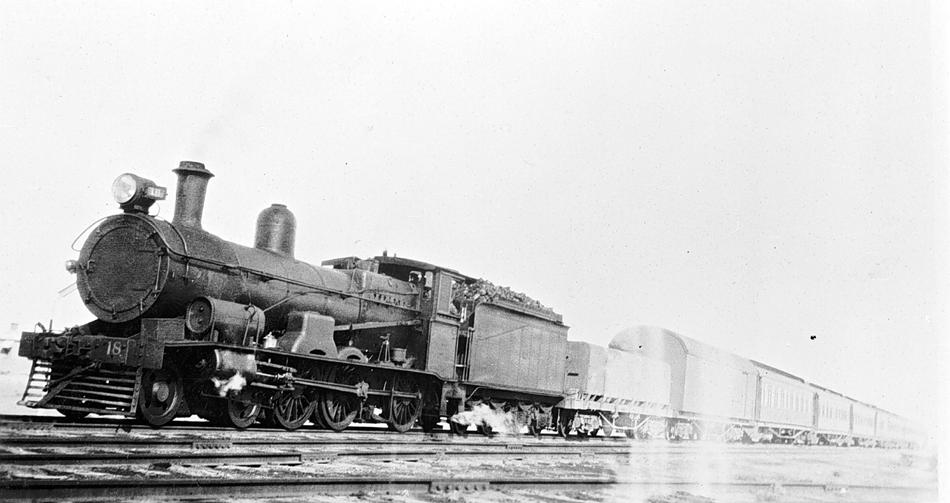
G18 with the Trans-Australian Express, Cook, South Australia, 1935

The Commonwealth Railways was only inaugurated in 1911, so when in 1912 the railway planned to acquire its first locomotives, the decision was to adopt a design of proven reliability from another Australian railway system. The New South Wales Government Railways had the advantage of being the only other standard-gauge railway on the continent, and its 191-strong fleet of P class (later named C32 class) locomotives had been refined since their introduction 20 years earlier. In December 1912, companies were invited to quote for four locomotives based on the P class but with much larger tenders because of the long distances between watering points. They were to be deployed first during the construction phase. The small quantity resulted from the prospect of internal combustion locomotives becoming available, but it soon became clear that the technology was still immature.

The four were built by Clyde Engineering, Sydney and were delivered between March and June 1914. Twelve followed from the Baldwin Locomotive Works, Philadelphia, between May and August 1914. A further ten were delivered by the Toowoomba Foundry between June 1916 and October 1917.

It was intended that the G class would be used on goods trains, and that a new, faster Pacific design would be purchased for passenger trains. But funding was short during World War I, so the G class units were instead upgraded to make them suitable for through-express working and the new Pacific did not proceed. In any case, only about half of the line's track mileage was ballasted until the eve of World War II, and therefore could not take the weight of a Pacific's 20-ton axle load (the G class axle load was 18 tons).

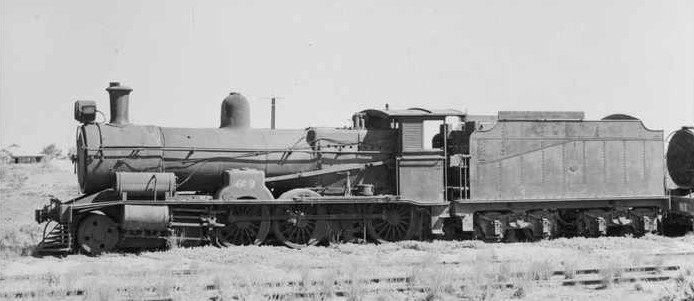
Locomotive G9 about 1951

When the line opened in October 1917, the G class started hauling goods trains and passenger trains including the Trans-Australian Express (later named theTrans-Australian). Although they proved a reliable locomotive as with their New South Wales counterparts, the high mineral content of the water on the Trans-Australian Railway was a constant impediment. Two were withdrawn in 1925 followed by a third in 1930. In the 1930s, seven were fitted with superheated boilers to replace the saturated examples. These were reclassified as the Ga class. When the more powerful C class locomotives arrived in 1938, they were gradually displaced. Most of the remainder were withdrawn from late 1951 as the GM class diesel-electrics entered service. The last served as a shunter at Port Pirie until withdrawn in 1958.

One locomotive has been preserved; it is on display at the National Railway Museum, Port Adelaide. (Note: The locomotive is numbered G1, but several clues suggest that the staff who took the initiative by storing it at Port Augusta after withdrawal from service re-painted G2 as G1. Records show that its boiler was last on G2; photographs exist of G1 broken down to its underframe ready for scrapping; and the large dent in the right-hand cylinder cover matches that of G2.)

== Bibliography ==
- Fluck, Ronald E; Marshall, Barry; Wilson, John (1996). Locomotives and Railcars of the Commonwealth Railways. Welland, SA: Gresley Publishing. ISBN 1876216018.
