= New South Wales C32 class locomotive =

Class of Australian 4-6-0 locomotives

New South Wales C32 class
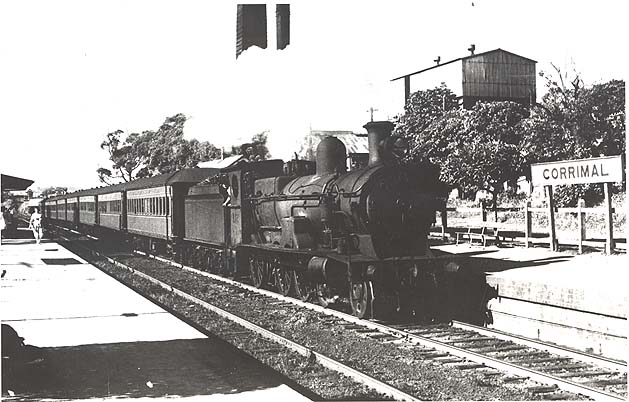
- A C32 class at Corrimal.
Type and origin
- Power type: Steam
- Builder: Beyer, Peacock & Company (106); Baldwin Locomotive Works (20); Clyde Engineering (45); Eveleigh Railway Workshops (20)
- Build date: 1892–1911
- Total produced: 191
Specifications
- Configuration
  - Whyte: 4-6-0
  - UIC: 2'Cn, later 2'Ch
- Gauge: 1,435 mm (4 ft 8 1/2 in) standard gauge
- Driver dia.: 5 ft 0 in (1,524 mm)
- Adhesive weight: 93,000–101,000 lb (42,184–45,813 kg; 42–46 t)
- Loco weight: 126,000–141,000 lb (57,153–63,957 kg; 57–64 t)
- Fuel type: Coal
- Firebox
  - Grate area: 27 sq ft (2.5 m^{2})
- Boiler pressure: 150–160 psi (1.03–1.10 MPa)
- Heating surface: 1,485–1,925 sq ft (138.0–178.8 m^{2})
- Superheater
  - Type: None originally, later all retrofitted
  - Heating area: 335–430 sq ft (31.1–39.9 m^{2})
- Cylinders: Two, outside
- Cylinder size: 20 in × 26 in (508 mm × 660 mm) or 21 in × 26 in (533 mm × 660 mm)
Performance figures
- Tractive effort: 23,573–25,990 lbf (104.9–115.6 kN)
- Factor of adh.: 3.89–4.06
Career
- Operators: New South Wales Government Railways
- Class: P6, C32 from 1924
- Withdrawn: 1957–1971
- Preserved: 3203, 3214, 3237, 3265
- Disposition: 4 preserved, 187 scrapped

The C32 class is a class of steam locomotives built for the New South Wales Government Railways of Australia.

== History ==
=== Introduction ===
When the new Chief Commissioner, Edward Eddy, took office in 1888, he was anxious to have additional locomotives manufactured within the colony of New South Wales, and the Government sought the formation of a manufacturing company in New South Wales by interested parties. When this failed, designs were prepared prior to inviting tenders in England.

Beyer, Peacock & Company was selected to build the new locomotives. The first batch of 50 locomotives were delivered between February 1892 and July 1893. They became known as the Manchester Engines.

At the request of the Railway Commissioners, the builders altered the last two engines of the first batch to operate as compounds, but these did not prove satisfactory and during 1901 were converted to 2-cylinders. The particular compound arrangement was never used in another locomotive, before or since.

Further orders over the 19 years saw 191 locomotives built the last being delivered in April 1911. The initial 50 were built with six wheel tenders, the remainder with eight wheel bogie tenders. Many of the originals were later equipped with bogie tenders, however a number of the class kept the shorter tenders to enable them to be turned on the 50-foot (15.24 m) turntables at certain locations.

The final engine was built with a superheater, and tests showed a significant improvement in performance. As a result, the remaining 190 engines were similarly fitted as they became due for boiler renewal between 1914 and 1939.

The first passenger locomotives used on the Trans-Australian Railway the 26 strong Commonwealth Railways G class, were of similar design.

=== Into service ===
When first introduced, the class was assigned to the Northern and Southern mail and express trains. Following the strengthening of the Murrumbidgee River railway bridge, Wagga Wagga in 1901, they worked the full length of the Main South line from Sydney to Albury, the express covering the 621 km in 12 hours and 35 minutes, including 14 stops.

With the arrival of even larger engines from 1909 to handle the important mail and express trains, the P class were redeployed to other passenger services. In November 1929 they were used on the inaugural Newcastle Flyers. They also began hauling the Caves Express to Mount Victoria and the South Coast Daylight Express to Bomaderry.

Apart from some very light country branch lines, the class worked throughout the state. They worked almost all Illawarra line passenger services right up until the end of steam. They were equally at home on commuter services to Campbelltown or Richmond; on Newcastle suburban trains as far as Singleton and Dungog; on country branch line mixed or goods trains or even the Riverina Express from Narrandera to Griffith.

In the 1950s, it was found that the original low frames of the class were cracking causing most of the class to be reframed with higher frames.

=== Last years and demise ===
The first of the class to be withdrawn was 3264 following an accident at Otford in October 1956. Following the arrival of the 48 class diesels from 1959, withdrawals began in earnest. On 24 July 1971, the last regularly steam-hauled passenger train in New South Wales was hauled by 3246 from Newcastle to Singleton. In December 1971, 3229 (a shunting locomotive at Goulburn Depot) was the last of its class to be withdrawn.

The member of the class which attained the highest distance travelled in its life was 3210, with a figure of 4,185,685 kilometres (2,600,864 mi) which was also the highest distance travelled by any New South Wales steam locomotive.

== Preservation ==
Preserved C32 class locomotives
| Photograph | No. | Manufacturer | Year | Current organisation | Location | Status | Ref |
|---|---|---|---|---|---|---|---|
| | 3203 | Beyer, Peacock & Company | 1891 | Transport Heritage NSW | Cooma Monaro Railway | On display, withdrawn 1981 | |
| | 3214 | Beyer, Peacock & Company | 1891 | Transport Heritage NSW | Valley Heights | Static display, withdrawn August 1982 | |
| | 3237 | Beyer, Peacock & Company | 1892 | Lachlan Valley Railway | Orange | Operational | |
| | 3265 | Beyer, Peacock & Company | 1901 | Powerhouse Museum | Thirlmere | Operational | |
