= Trans-Australian =

Former rail service in Australia

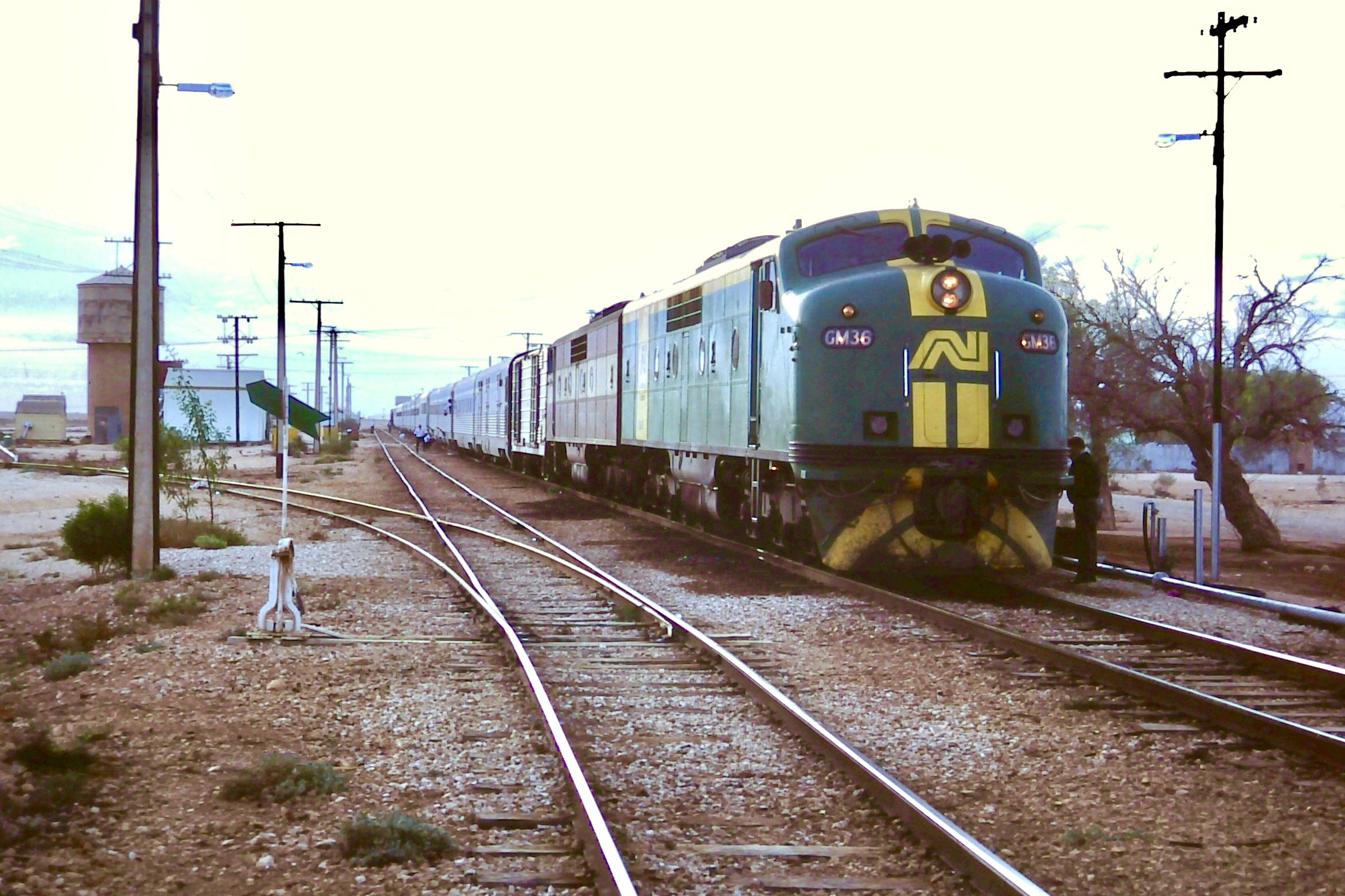
- The Trans-Australian soon after dawn at Cook station bound for Perth in 1986

Overview
- Status: Discontinued
- Locale: South Australia; Western Australia
- First service: 1917
- Last service: 27 June 1991
- Former operators: Commonwealth Railways (1917–1975); Australian National (1975–1991); Western Australian Government Railways (1969–1991)

Route
- Termini: Port Augusta / Port Pirie / Adelaide; Kalgoorlie / Perth
- Lines used: Adelaide-Port Augusta; Trans-Australian; Eastern Goldfields; Eastern

Technical
- Track gauge: 1,435 mm (4 ft 8 1/2 in)

The Trans-Australian (originally known as the Trans-Australian Express) was an Australian passenger train operated by the Commonwealth Railways initially between Port Augusta and Kalgoorlie on the Trans-Australian Railway line, and later extended west to Perth, and east to Port Pirie and Adelaide.

== History ==
The train commenced operating between Port Augusta and Kalgoorlie in 1917 following the completion of the Trans-Australian Railway. It was extended to Port Pirie in 1937 following the completion of this part of the line.

Initially the train was hauled by G class locomotives and from 1938 by C class locomotives. In 1951 it began to be hauled by GM class diesel locomotives.

Originally it only conveyed sleeping accommodation but aside from a period in the 1960s, it was not until 1981 that seated accommodation was provided. In 1964 Commonwealth Railways purchased 24 carbon steel carriages from Commonwealth Engineering, Granville. These were later augmented by stainless steel carriages. It also operated with other rolling stock, de-motored Bluebird railcars being used by the late 1980s.

Following the conversion of the line from Kalgoorlie to standard gauge the Trans-Australian was extended to Perth on 15 June 1969 replacing The Westland. For a time from December 1973 the service ran daily with the Trans-Australian combined with the Indian Pacific at Port Pirie on the days the latter ran.

At this stage the service was operating five times per week, with the Indian Pacific operating on the other days to provide a daily service. This had ceased by May 1977 with each operating individually and the Trans-Australian reduced to three times weekly.

After the Port Pirie to Adelaide line was converted to standard gauge in 1982, the Trans Australian was extended to Keswick Terminal in Adelaide.

In the wake of a recession and cheaper air fares, the service was reduced from two services per week to one in February 1991 with this too cancelled from June 1991.

== Gallery ==
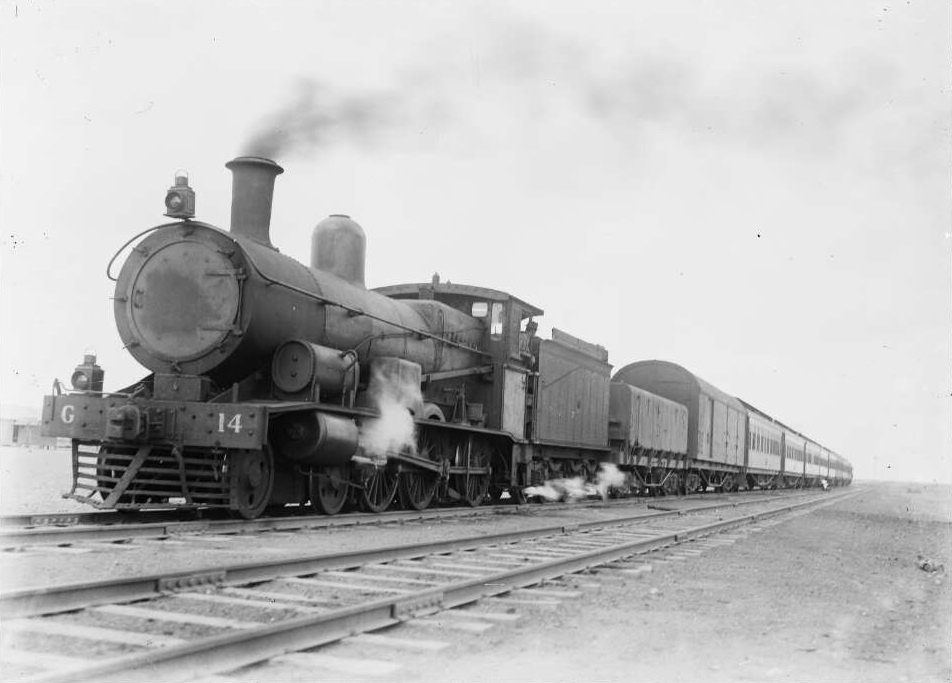
The Trans-Australian in 1924

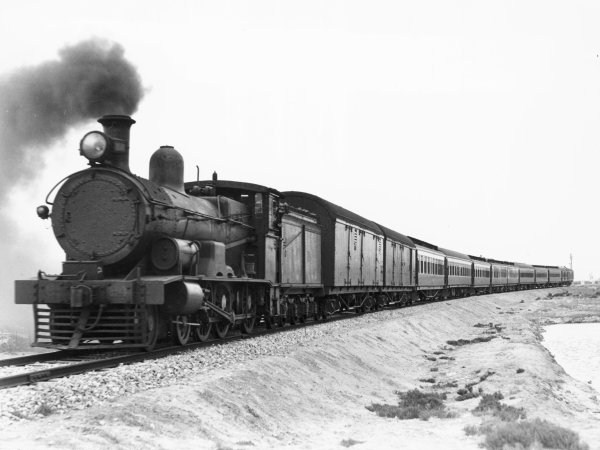
The Trans-Australian in 1938

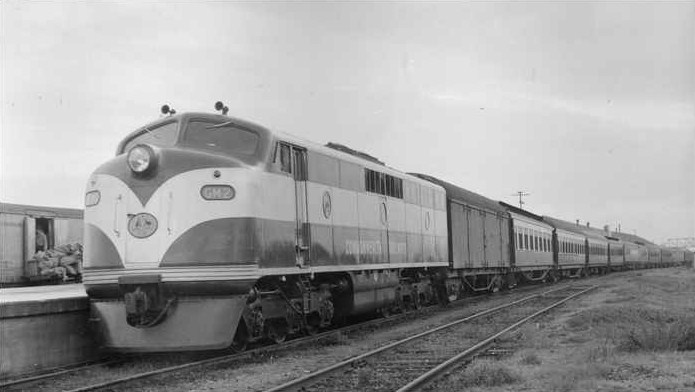
The Trans-Australian in 1951

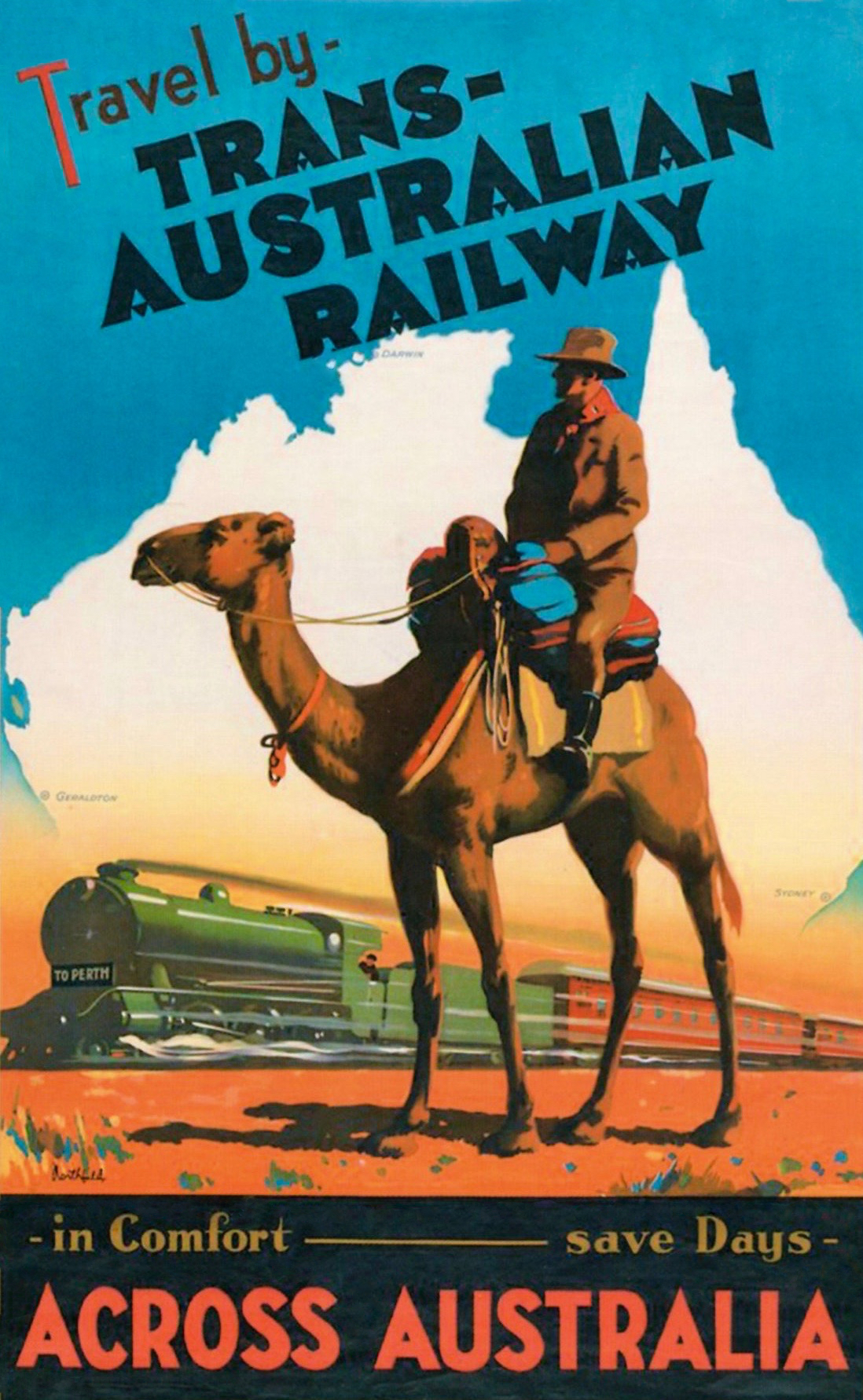
Poster advertising the Trans-Australian about 1940

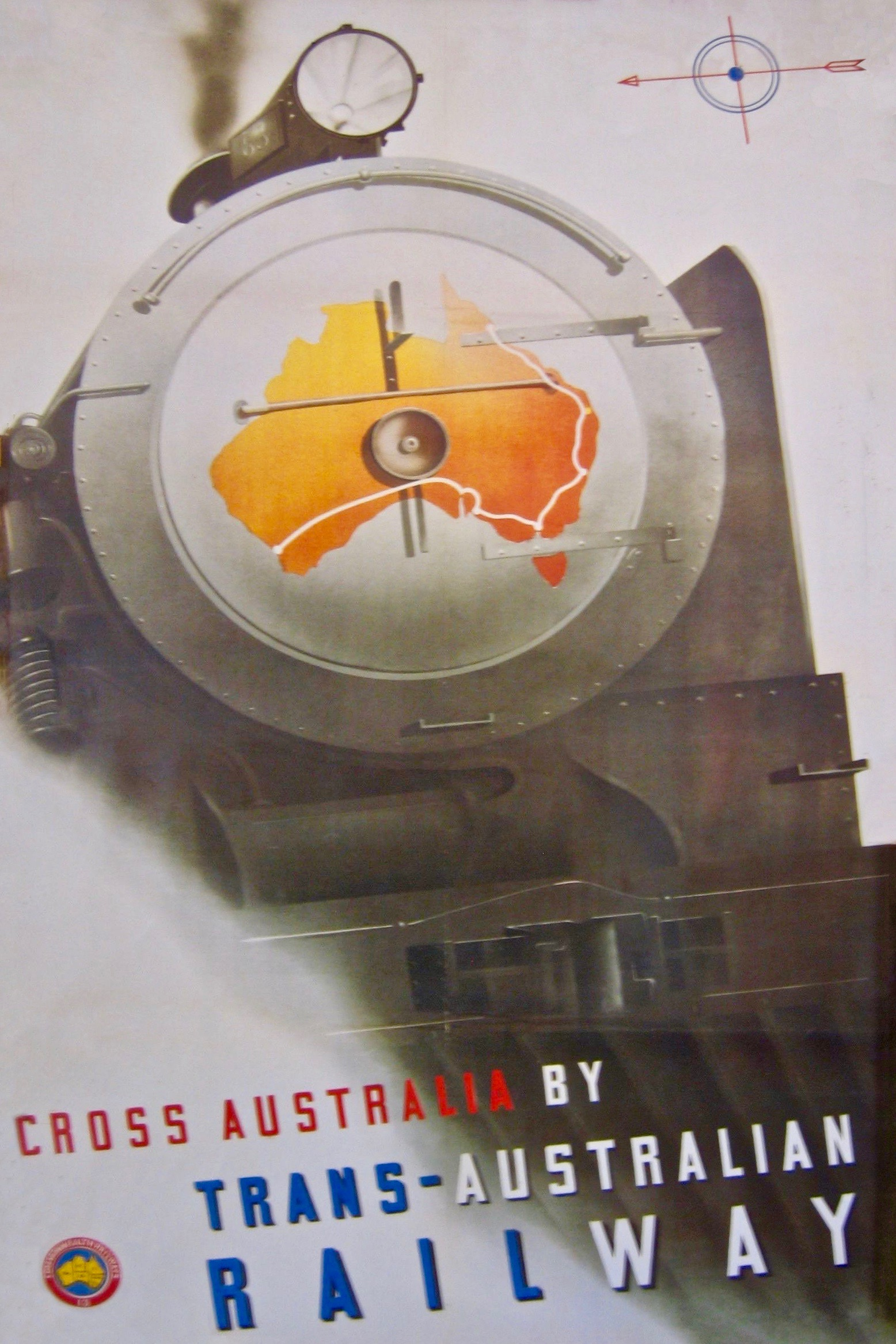
Post-war poster advertising the Trans-Australian in the final years of steam traction

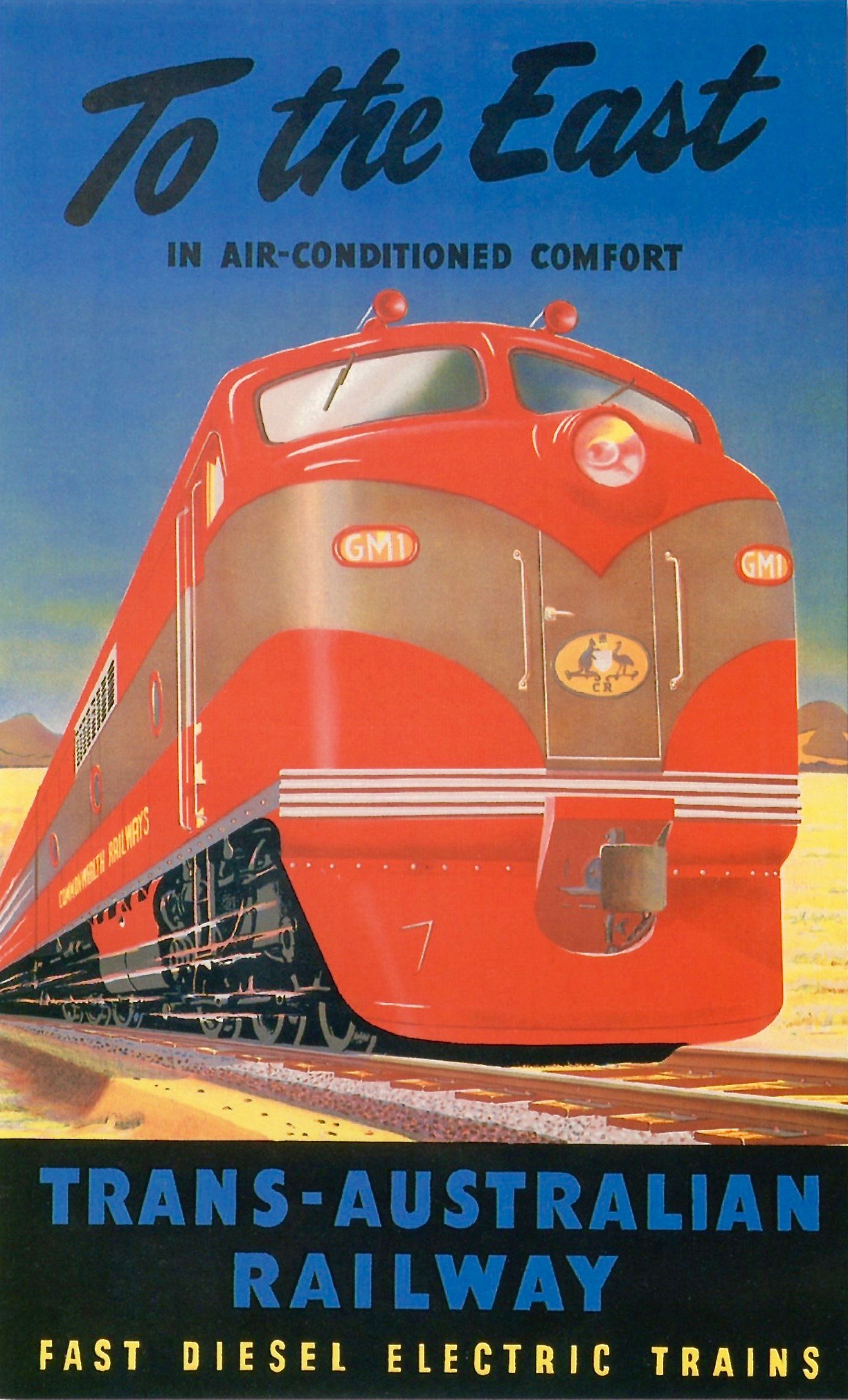
Poster advertising the introduction of diesel locomotives for the Trans-Australian in 1951

== See also ==
- List of named passenger trains of Australia

== Sources ==
- Higham, Geoffrey (2007). Marble Bar to Mandurah: A History of Passenger Rail Services in Western Australia (1st ed.). Bassendean: Rail Heritage WA. ISBN 978-0-9803922-0-3. OCLC 271545712. Wikidata Q140375689.
