= Commonwealth Railways CN class =

Class of former CN H-6-c locomotives

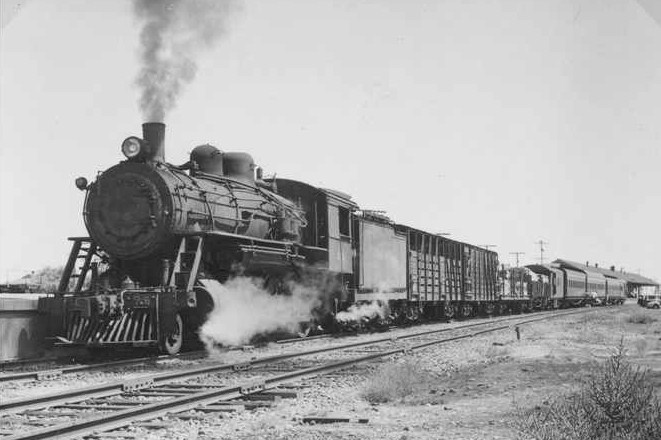
- CN76 at Port Pirie Junction station in 1951
Type and origin
- Power type: Steam
- Builder: Montreal Locomotive Works
- Serial number: see article
- Build date: 1907-1908
- Total produced: 8
Specifications
- Configuration
  - Whyte: 4-6-0
- Gauge: 1,435 mm (4 ft 8 1/2 in) standard gauge
- Driver dia.: 63 in
- Adhesive weight: 126,000 lbs
- Loco weight: 163,000 lbs
- Total weight: 284,800 lbs
- Fuel type: Coal
- Fuel capacity: 10 t
- Water cap.: 5,000 imp gal
- Boiler: Extended wagon top
- Boiler pressure: 200 psi
- Superheater: Schmidt
- Cylinders: 2
- Cylinder size: 20 × 26 in
- Valve gear: Stephenson
Performance figures
- Tractive effort: 28060 lbf
Career
- Operators: Commonwealth Railways
- Class: CN
- Number in class: 8
- Numbers: CN70-CN77
- First run: November 1942
- Withdrawn: April 1952
- Disposition: All scrapped

The Commonwealth Railways CN class was a class of 4-6-0 steam locomotives purchased by the Commonwealth Railways, Australia, from the Canadian National Railway (CN) during World War II, for use on the Trans-Australian Railway.

The eight locomotives in the class had been built in 1907-1908 by Montreal Locomotive Works, Montreal, Quebec, for the Canadian Northern Railway, three coming from Lot Q-67 built in 1907 and the remainder from Lot Q-79 built in 1918. After passing into CN ownership in 1918, they became part of CN's H-6-c class.

Built as saturated locomotives (CR 73, 74, and 77 with piston valves), they were rebuilt at various dates starting in June 1913 with CNoR 1282 (CR 77) with Schmidt superheaters and 22×26 inch cylinders and 180 psi boiler pressure. This was followed by CNoR 1298 (CR 72) in October 1913, CNoR 1283 (CR 73) in May 1914, and CNoR 1290 (CR 76) in June 1914. In December 1916, CNoR 1293 and 1308 (CR 70 and 71) were rebuilt the same way but with Hungerford & Cameron superheaters; exceptionally, 1293 kept the original 20×26 inch cylinders. CNoR 1292 (CR 75) underwent the H&C superheater rebuild in June 1917, and CN 1279 (CR 74) followed in July 1919. In 1926, the CNR began to bush the cylinders back to 20 inches and adjusting the boiler pressure to 200 psi; 1279 became the first of the future CR engines to undergo this procedure in June of that year, followed by 1283 in November 1926, 1290 and 1308 in January 1928, 1292 in April 1908, and 1298 in May 1908. Engines rebuilt with H&C superheaters had these replaced with Schmidt superheaters beginning in the late 1920s. Of the units sent to Australia, CN 1292 was the first in June 1928, followed by 1293 in August 1929, 1308 in November 1929, and 1279 in May 1930.

The eight locomotives were dismantled at CN's Transcona shops and taken to the port of Vancouver, British Columbia on flat cars. Despite being withdrawn by 1952 they were not scrapped right after instead remaining derelict until 1959.

CR number	Serial number	CNoR number	CN number (1912/1)	Retired	Sold for scrap	Total CR mileage
70	44780	232	1293	1951/12	after 1959	96,632
71	44795	247	1308	1951/5	1959/3/27	84,416
72	44785	237	1298	1951/5	1959/3/27	123,804
73	42657	223	1284	1951/3	1959/3/27	96,777
74	42653	218	1279	1951/5	1959/3/27	88,383
75	44779	231	1292	1951/10	1958/7/4	95,141
76	44777	229	1290	1952/6	after 1959	101,727
77	42656	221	1283	1951/12	after 1959	137,472

- Data from McQueen 2013
