= Commonwealth Railways CA class =

Class of former NH G-4a locomotives

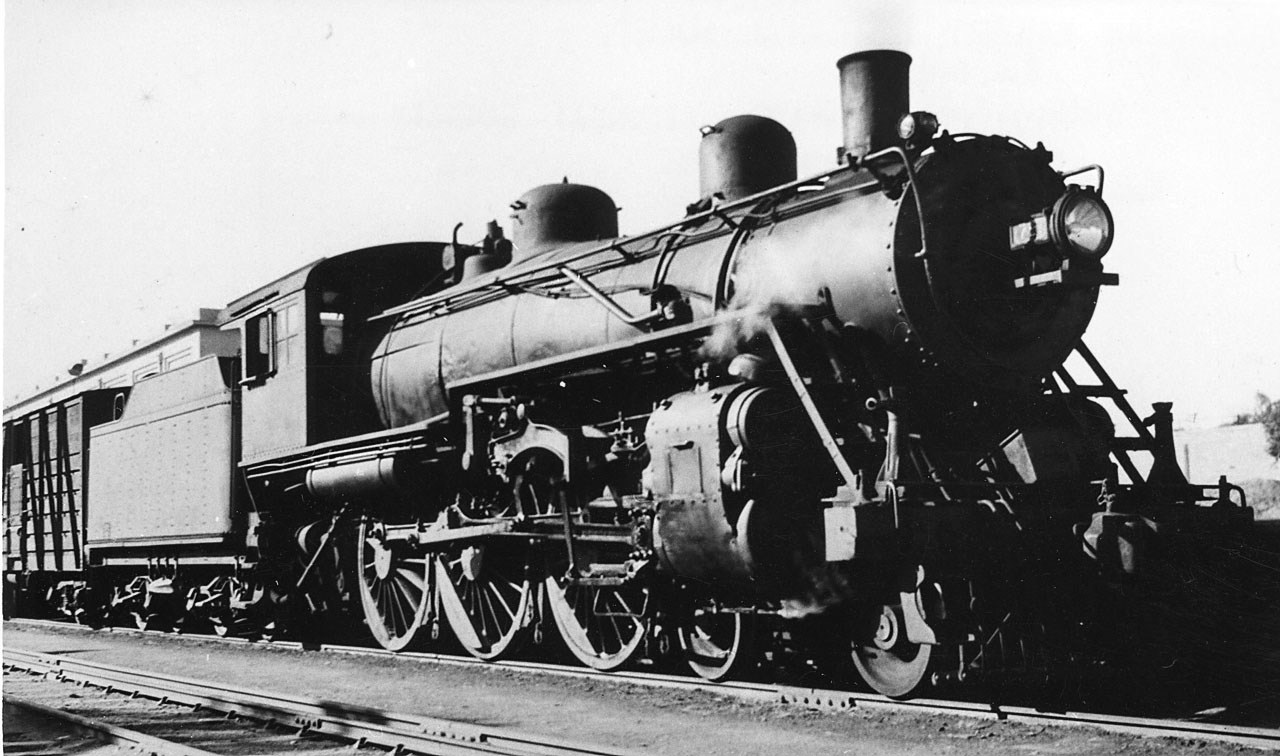
- CA79 at Port Augusta, c. 1945
Type and origin
- Power type: Steam
- Builder: Baldwin Locomotive Works
- Build date: 1905, 1907
- Total produced: 2
Specifications
- Configuration
  - Whyte: 4-6-0
- Gauge: 1,435 mm (4 ft 8 1/2 in)
- Driver dia.: 73 in (1,854 mm)
- Length: 62 ft 4 in (19.00 m)
- Axle load: 20 long tons 4 cwt (45,200 lb or 20.5 t)
- Fuel type: Coal
- Water cap.: 5,000 imp gal (22,730 L)
- Tender cap.: 9 long tons 0 cwt (20,200 lb or 9.1 t) coal
- Firebox
  - Grate area: 34.6 sq ft (3.2 m^{2})
- Boiler pressure: 190 psi (1.31 MPa)
- Superheater
  - Heating area: 400 sq ft (37.2 m^{2})
- Cylinders: 2
- Cylinder size: 22 in × 26 in (559 mm × 660 mm)
- Valve gear: Southern (CA78), Baker (CA79)
Performance figures
- Tractive effort: 27,840 lbf (123.8 kN)
Career
- Operators: Commonwealth Railways
- Number in class: 2
- Numbers: CA78–CA79
- First run: August 1943
- Withdrawn: May 1950
- Disposition: Both scrapped

The Commonwealth Railways CA class was a class of 4-6-0 steam locomotives purchased by the Commonwealth Railways, Australia, from the New York, New Haven and Hartford Railroad (NH), USA, through Lend-Lease during World War II.

The two locomotives in the class, CA78 and CA79, had been built in 1907 and 1905, respectively, by Baldwin Locomotive Works, Philadelphia, USA, and had been part of NH's G-4a class. They arrived in Australia in August 1943 and were used on the Trans-Australian Railway. CA78 was withdrawn in 1945 and CA79 in 1950. Both were scrapped in 1956.
