= Commonwealth Railways K class =

Class of Australian 2-8-0 locomotives

Type and origin
- Power type: Steam
- Builder: North British Locomotive Company
- Serial number: 21230-21237
- Build date: 1916
- Total produced: 8
Specifications
- Configuration
  - Whyte: 2-8-0
- Gauge: 1,435 mm (4 ft 8 1/2 in) standard gauge
- Loco weight: 111 long tons (113 t; 124 short tons)
- Fuel type: Coal
- Water cap.: 4,850 imp gal (22,000 L; 5,820 US gal)
- Firebox
  - Grate area: 29 sq ft (2.7 m^{2})
- Boiler pressure: 160 psi (11 bar; 1,100 kPa)
- Cylinder size: 21 in × 26 in (533 mm × 660 mm)
Performance figures
- Tractive effort: 28,777 lbf (128.01 kN)
Career
- Operators: Commonwealth Railways
- Numbers: K27-K34
- First run: March 1916
- Disposition: All scrapped

The Commonwealth Railways K class was a class of 2-8-0 freight locomotives built in 1916 by North British Locomotive Company, United Kingdom, for the Commonwealth Railways, Australia.

== History ==
In order to operate freight trains on the then under construction Trans-Australian Railway, Commonwealth Railways ordered eight locomotives of the same design as the New South Wales Government Railways' T class (later the D50 class), but with higher capacity tenders.

All were delivered between March and June 1916. Most had been withdrawn by the early 1950s with the last withdrawn in March 1952 after dieselisation.
