= Norris Garrett Bell =

Railway engineer in Australia

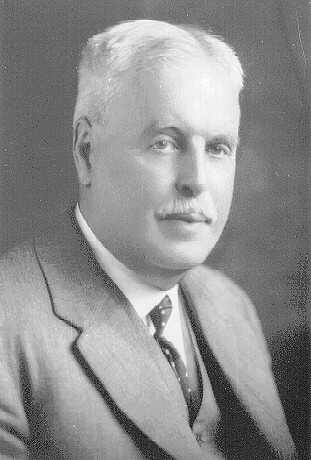
Norris Garrett Portrait

Norris Garrett Bell CMG (1860 – 12 January 1937), sometimes referred to as Col. N. G. Bell, was a Scottish-born railway engineer in Australia. He was employed as the Commissioner of Railways from 1917 to 1929 and played a significant role all aspects of constructing the Central Australia Railway from Oodnadatta to Alice Springs.

== Career ==
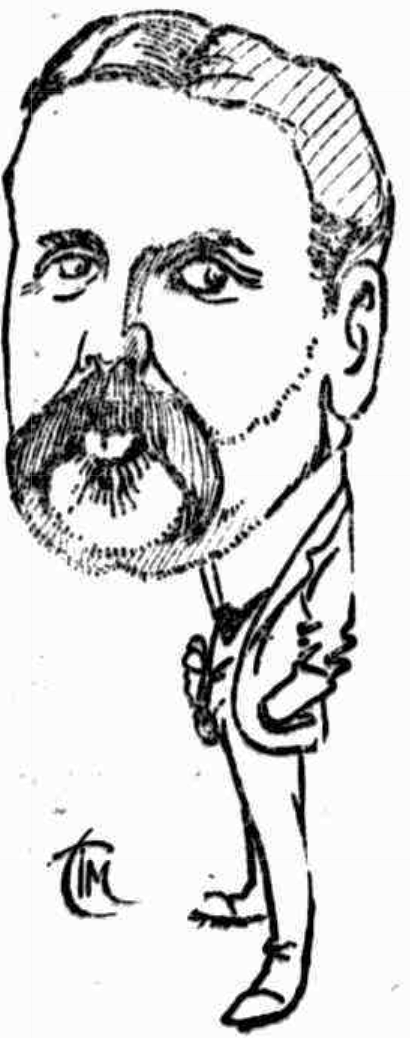
Norris Garrett Bell

Bell was born in Dundee, Scotland in 1860, and was educated at the High School of Dundee and Edinburgh Collegiate School, followed by the University of Edinburgh where he studied engineering, and had some experience with railway engineering in Scotland. He migrated to Australia in 1886 and took on the position of Resident Engineer for the Cooktown Railway in Queensland. He later said the difficulties of operating that railway in the monsoonal tropical far north of Australia had prepared him for anything.

Bell went on to become Chief Engineer of the New South Wales Government Railways then of the Commonwealth Railways in March 1914, succeeding Henry Deans.

In 1917 he was appointed the first Commissioner for Railways and tasked (along with John Forrest) with heading construction of the Trans-Australian Railway across the Nullarbor Plain and later the Central Australia Railway from Oodnadatta to Alice Springs. The Trans-Australia Railway was built to standard gauge and the section towards Alice Springs, mainly due to budget constraints, was built to narrow gauge. This would cause many problems until the opening of the replacement standard gauge line in 1980.

Bell is remembered as a visionary: while the states of Australia looked at their railways parochially, Bell pushed for national consistency within the railway. He argued that standard gauge should be adopted as the national railway gauge and spoke often about the logistical problems of operating break of gauge railway stations. Bell played a significant role in assisting George Dibbs in founding the Australian Standards Association. Bell retired in 1929 just after the arrival of the first steam train hauled by NM35 into the town of Stuart (now Alice Springs), and was succeeded by George Gahan.

Bell died in 1937 aged 76. His remains were buried at the Cheltenham Cemetery.

== Other interests ==
Bell was appointed JP for Normanton in 1893.

He was a member of Melbourne's Yorick Club, a keen golfer, bowls player and gardener.

== Recognition ==
- Bowen was appointed honorary Colonel of the Commonwealth Military Forces in 1914
- On leaving Queensland, Bell was given a tribute in verse (and caricature, above) from the normally acerbic Truth newspaper.
- Bell was created a CBE in 1929.

== Family ==
Bell married Agnes; they had three sons and three daughters (A son and a daughter died in infancy): The children who survived to adulthood were:

- Sidney Garrett Bell (c. 1893 – 25 December 1949), head of BHP operations in New South Wales
- Gerald G. Bell (B:1891 – ), grazier in New South Wales
- Agnes Grace Bell ( B:1888 – ) married Lieut. Rowland Griffiths Bowen, RAN on 14 August 1914
- Alice Gibson Bell (B:1902 – )

They had a home in Wellington Street, Middle Brighton.
