= Commonwealth Railways C class =

Class of Australian 4-6-0 locomotives

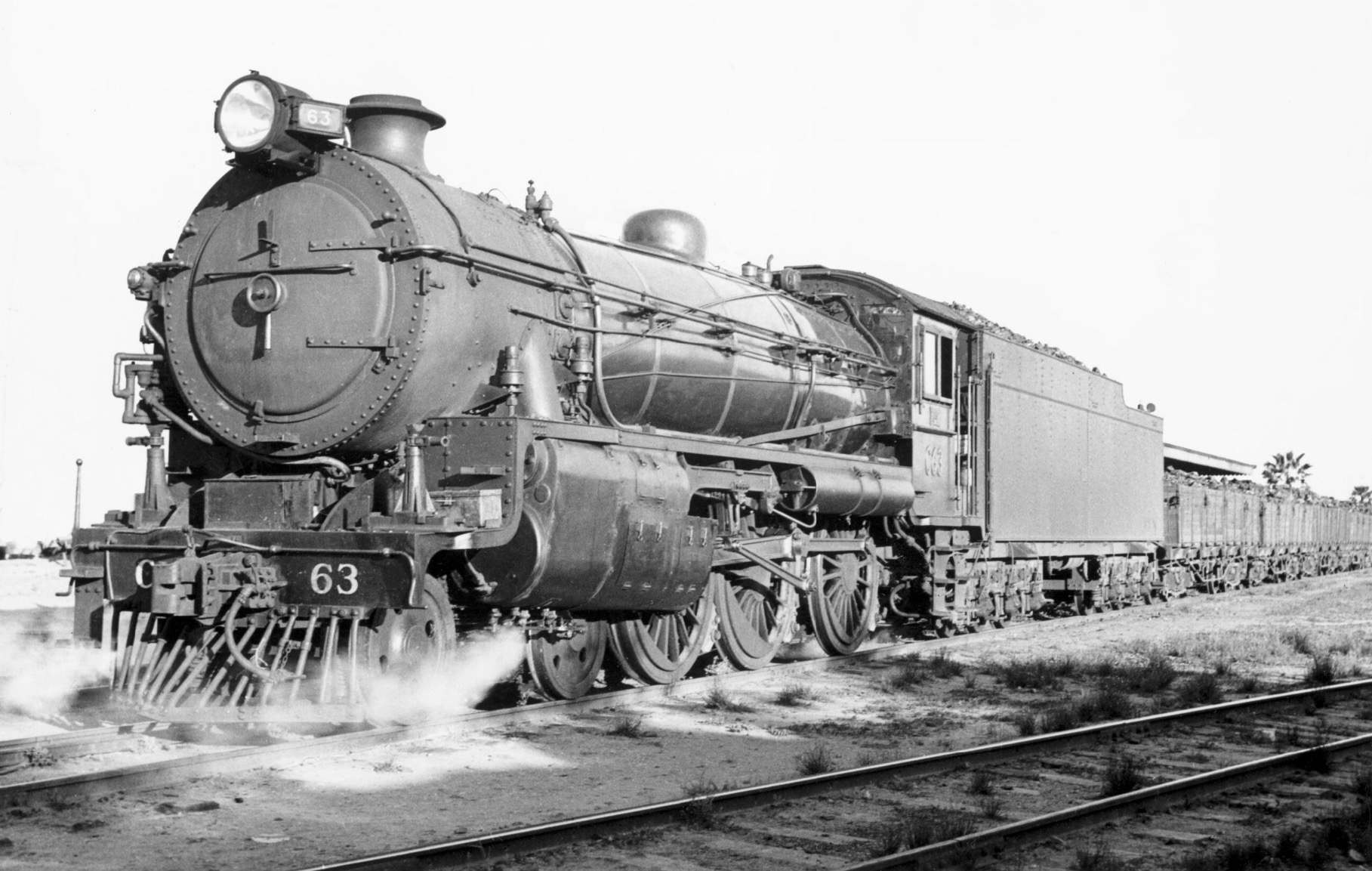
- Locomotive C63 in 1938 with ore cars. Notable are the long tender, the dust cowling over the valve motion, and the thermocouple cabling to monitor the temperature of the tender's axleboxes.
Type and origin
- Power type: Steam
- Builder: Walkers Limited
- Serial number: 454-461
- Build date: 1938
- Total produced: 8
Specifications
- Configuration
  - Whyte: 4-6-0
- Gauge: 4 ft 8 1/2 in (1,435 mm) standard gauge
- Loco weight: 207 long tons (210 t; 232 short tons)
- Fuel type: Coal
- Water cap.: 12,180 imp gal (55,400 L; 14,630 US gal)
- Firebox
  - Grate area: 30.5 sq ft (2.83 m^{2})
- Boiler pressure: 180 psi (12 bar; 1,200 kPa)
- Cylinder size: 23 in × 26 in (584 mm × 660 mm)
Performance figures
- Tractive effort: 30,498 lbf (135.66 kN)
Career
- Operators: Commonwealth Railways
- Numbers: C62-C69
- First run: January 1938
- Disposition: All scrapped

The Commonwealth Railways C class was a class of 4-6-0 passenger locomotives built in 1938 by Walkers Limited, Maryborough, for the Commonwealth Railways, Australia.

== History ==
Following the extension of Commonwealth Railways' standard gauge line from Port Augusta to Port Pirie in 1937, and with increasing loads being hauled on the Trans-Australian Railway, an order was placed with Walkers Limited, Maryborough for eight 4-6-0 passenger locomotives to the same design as the New South Wales Government Railways' C36 class, but with higher capacity tenders.

All were delivered between January and April 1938. The new locomotives were able to shave 10 hours off the journey time of the Trans Australian. Four were converted to burn oil during the 1949 coal strike, being converted back to coal burning after the strike ended.

With the arrival of the GM class diesels, the first was withdrawn in January 1952 and by early 1953 only two remained. The last was withdrawn in September 1957. The locomotives were scrapped, but the tenders were converted into water carriers for use on the Commonwealth Railways weed killer train, still being in use in the early 1980s.
