= Commonwealth Railways =

Australian railway operator (1912–1975)

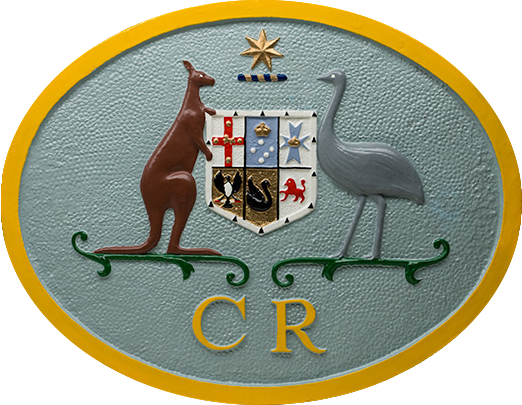

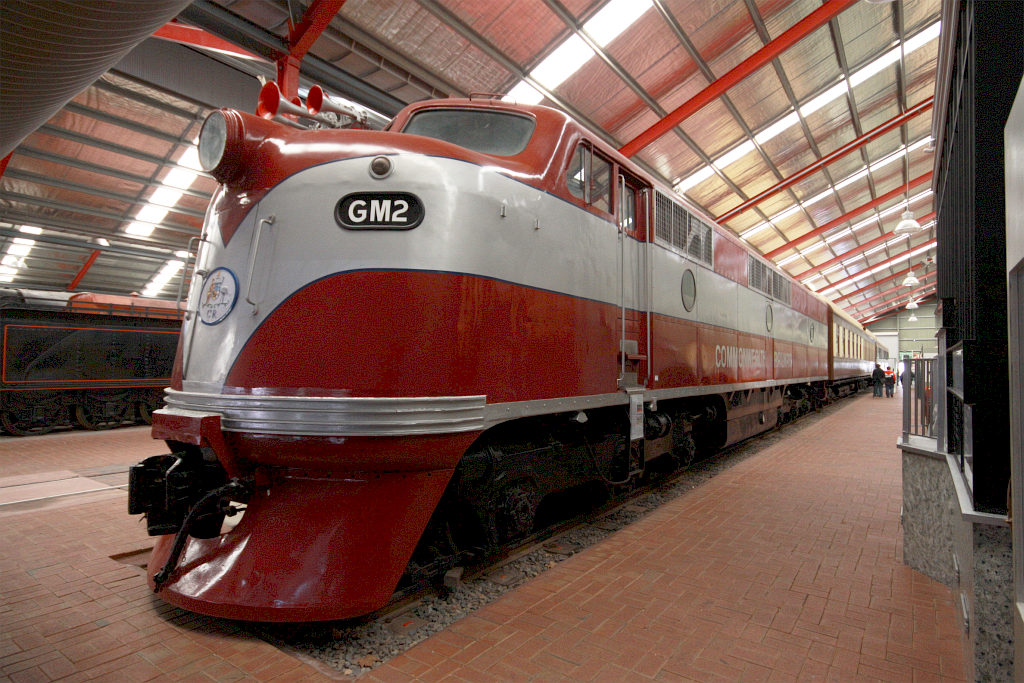
- Preserved Commonwealth Railways GM class diesel locomotive at the National Railway Museum, Port Adelaide
- Type: Statutory corporation
- Industry: Railways, freight, overland transport
- Founded: 1917
- Defunct: June 1975
- Successor: Australian National Railways Commission, branded as Australian National and subsequently AN
- Headquarters: Port Augusta
- Area served: Northern Territory; South Australia; Western Australia
- Parent: Australian Government, termed Commonwealth Government when the Commonwealth Railways were extant

Commonwealth Railways was a railway operator established in 1917 by the Australian Government to administer the Trans-Australia and Port Augusta-to-Darwin railways. It was effectively a statutory corporation, having been formed under, and governed by, the Commonwealth Railways Act. In 1975, all assets were acquired by the Australian National Railways Commission, branded as 'Australian National Railways' and subsequently 'Australian National', and trademarked as 'AN'.

== Operated railways ==
=== Trans-Australian Railway ===
Construction of the standard-gauge Trans-Australian Railway between Port Augusta and Kalgoorlie commenced in 1912. Despite the inhospitable nature of the terrain and wartime supply problems, satisfactory progress was made, and the two tracklaying machines, one working from each end, met near Ooldea on 17 October 1917.

The promise to construct the Trans-Australian Railway had been one of the principal inducements to Western Australia to join the Commonwealth of Australia during federation, and it was for the purpose of surveying and constructing this railway that the Commonwealth Railways Department was initially formed. It was a matter of misfortune that its two termini were break-of-gauge stations connecting with narrow-gauge lines that formed part of the transcontinental link.

In 1937, the eastern end was extended south to Port Pirie, enabling one less break of gauge in the trip across Australia, but at the same time establishing a three-gauge junction at Port Pirie with the 1600 mm (5 ft 3 in) broad gauge South Australian Railways line to Adelaide.

The Trans-Australian Railway remained an isolated stretch of standard-gauge track between two narrow-gauge railways until 1968, when the Kalgoorlie to Perth standard-gauge line replaced the line at the western end, and 1970 when a standard-gauge line from Port Pirie to Broken Hill replaced a narrow-gauge line, completing the long-delayed project to connect Perth to Sydney with one standard gauge.

The Trans-Australian Railway remained fundamentally a single-track main line, the only branch line being a short section from Pimba to Woomera (officially known as a stores siding, though a passenger service operated when Woomera was the base of a large rocket testing range). There are two junctions: one on the outskirts of Port Augusta is the line to Whyalla, which opened for traffic in 1972; and one at Tarcoola is the Central Australia Railway, which opened in 1980.

=== North Australia Railway ===
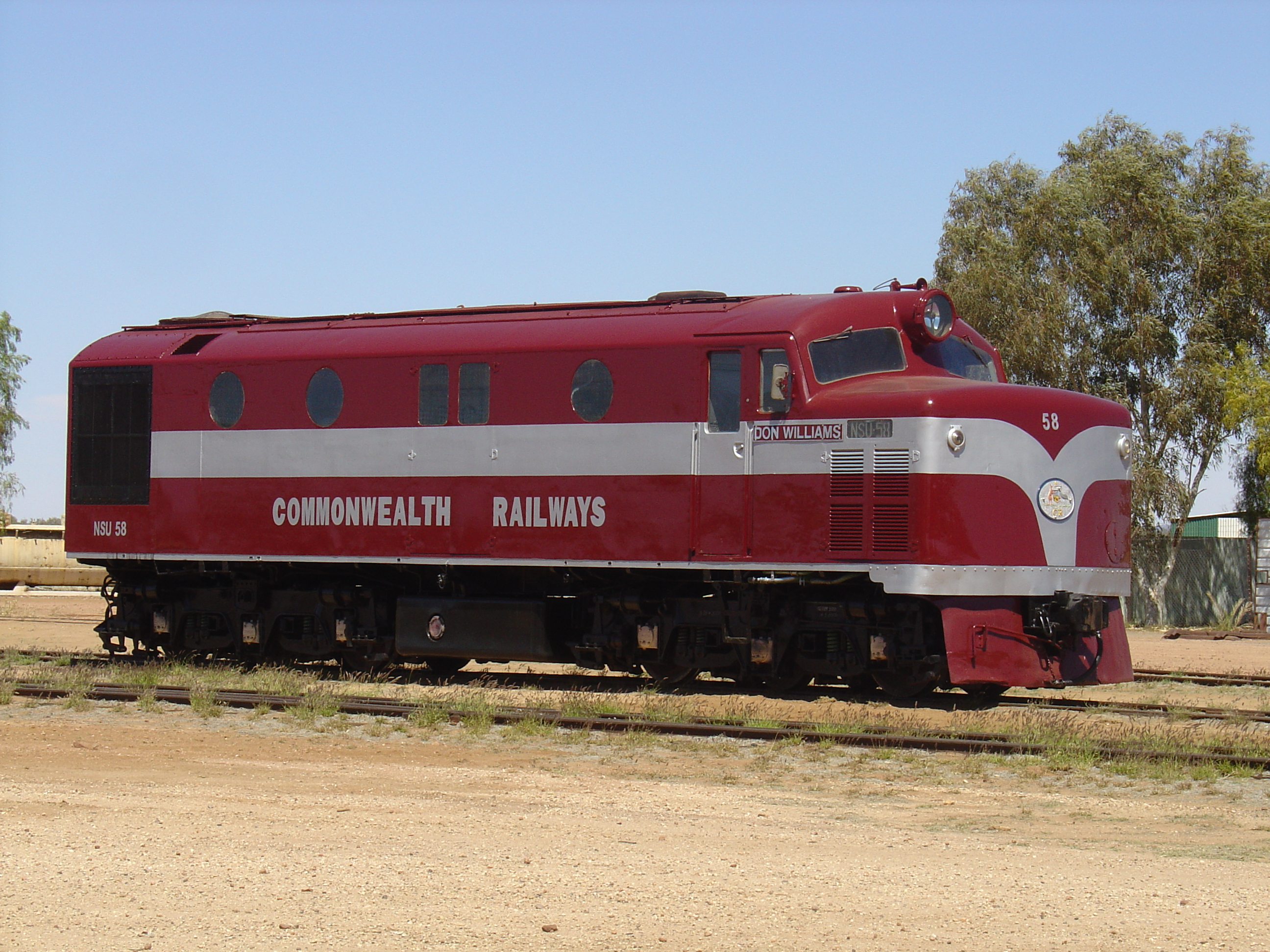
Preserved NSU class narrow-gauge diesel-electric locomotive at the Old Ghan Heritage Railway and Museum, Alice Springs, in 2006. As with the NT class, these locomotives operated on both the North Australia Railway and the Central Australia Railway.

The North Australia Railway was the name given to the Northern Territory narrow-gauge railway that extended south from Darwin to Birdum. Construction of this line was commenced by the Government of South Australia, being known then as the Palmerston & Pine Creek Railway, it opened in 1889.

When the administration of the Northern Territory passed from South Australia to the Commonwealth Government on 1 January 1911, the railway was transferred to Commonwealth ownership. The railway was initially placed under the control of the Administrator of the Northern Territory. At this time, it was known as the Northern Territory Railway, but was transferred to the control of the Commonwealth Railways Commissioner in 1918.

It was renamed the North Australia Railway in 1926 in line with the division of the Northern Territory into the separate territories of Central Australia and North Australia. Extensions to Birdum were completed in 1929, but during and following World War II, the effective railhead was Larrimah, a few miles north.

The railway gained increased importance in the 1960s and early 1970s through the mining of iron ore from the Frances Creek deposits, about 230 kilometres south of Darwin. Ore traffic exceeded one million tons per annum, but after the mine closed, other traffic was not enough to justify keeping the railway open and it closed in 1976.

=== Australian Capital Territory railway ===
In March 1913, work began on an 8.5-kilometre (5.3-mile) standard-gauge line from Canberra to Queanbeyan on the Bombala line. The line was constructed by the New South Wales Public Works Department on behalf of the Federal Government. Canberra station and the line to Queanbeyan were owned and staffed by Commonwealth Railways, although all services on the line were operated by the New South Wales Government Railways.

=== Central Australia Railway ===
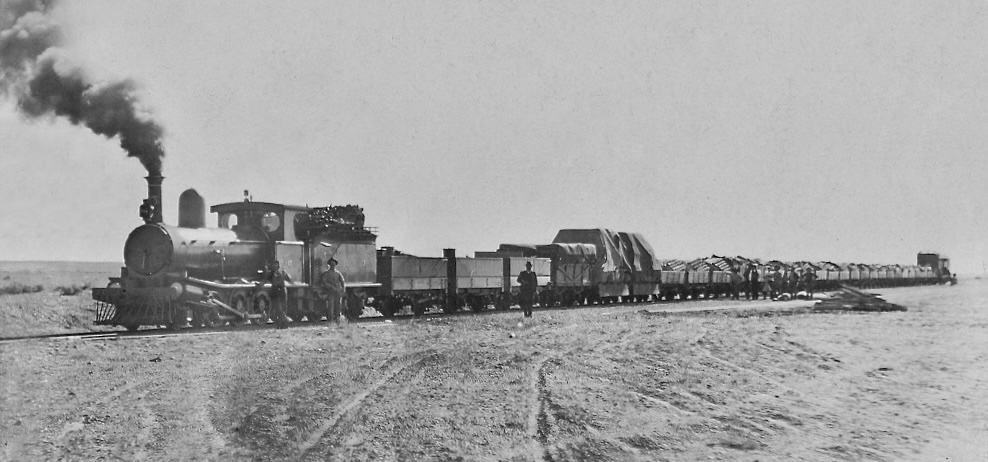
The flat, barren surroundings of Bopeechee, 777 km (483 mi) from Port Augusta, typified most of the Central Australia Railway. Although the railway served as a lifeline for outback communities, for most of the route the land was insufficiently productive to generate profitable traffic.

The Central Australia Railway extended from Port Augusta to Alice Springs. Work on the first section of this railway was commenced by the South Australian Railways in 1878.

Under South Australian ownership, the railway, known then as the Great Northern Railway, was extended in stages and reached Oodnadatta in 1891. The South Australian Government subsequently made offers to several syndicates to construct a line north from Oodnadatta to Pine Creek on the land grant system. However, negotiations were unsuccessful and Oodnadatta remained the railhead for almost four decades.

Like the North Australia Railway, this railway passed to Commonwealth ownership on 1 January 1911, but continued to be operated by the South Australian Railways until the Commonwealth Railways took over on 1 January 1926. An extension of the railway to Alice Springs was completed in 1929.

=== Stirling North to Marree railway ===
In the years following World War II, large tonnages of coal were railed from Leigh Creek and heavy demands were placed on the railway. The original line was inadequate: sharp curves and heavy gradients limited train loads, light track restricted speeds and axle loads, and floods and washaways were frequent. Consequently, a new standard-gauge Stirling North to Marree line was constructed and extended from Stirling North, via Telford to Marree. During the construction stages, and after washaways on the old line, but with the new standard-gauge line available to that point, complete trains of narrow-gauge wagons were carried (piggyback style) to Brachina, 140 km (87 mi) from Stirling North. Completed in 1957, the new line enabled immensely larger quantities of coal to be carried.

The old narrow-gauge line between Marree and Hawker was closed, but between Stirling North and Hawker it was retained and used to a limited extent for some years. The line between Stirling North and Hawker was closed in 1972 and the section between Stirling North and Quorn handed over to the operations of the Pichi Richi Railway.

== Gauges ==
=== Narrow gauge ===
The Commonwealth Railways owned and operated 1067 mm (3 ft 6 in) narrow-gauge lines on the Central Australia Railway (Port Augusta via Quorn and Marree to Alice Springs); and the North Australia Railway.

=== Standard gauge ===
The Commonwealth Railways owned and operated 1435 mm (4 ft 8 1/2 in) standard-gauge lines on the Trans-Australian Railway; the Central Australia Railway (both Tarcoola to Alice Springs and Port Augusta via Leigh Creek to Marree); and Whyalla to Port Augusta.

== Named trains ==
=== The Ghan ===
The Ghan train commenced operation for the Commonwealth Railways when they took over the narrow-gauge Central Australia Railway from the South Australian Railways in 1926. It ran between Port Augusta and Oodnadatta initially, being extended to Alice Springs in 1929. When the new standard gauge to Marree line opened in 1957 the journey was broken into two. A standard-gauge run from Port Pirie Junction to Marree, with the rest of the journey remaining on narrow gauge.

=== Indian Pacific ===
The Indian Pacific commenced operating in February 1970 between Sydney and Perth following completion of the standard gauge line. Commonwealth Railways were responsible for the train from Port Pirie to Kalgoorlie.

=== Tea & Sugar ===
The Tea & Sugar was a train that serviced isolated Australian towns between Port Augusta and Kalgoorlie. The train provided all the supplies for remote towns in South and Western Australia that were mainly inhabited by railway workers who maintained the line.

=== Trans-Australian ===
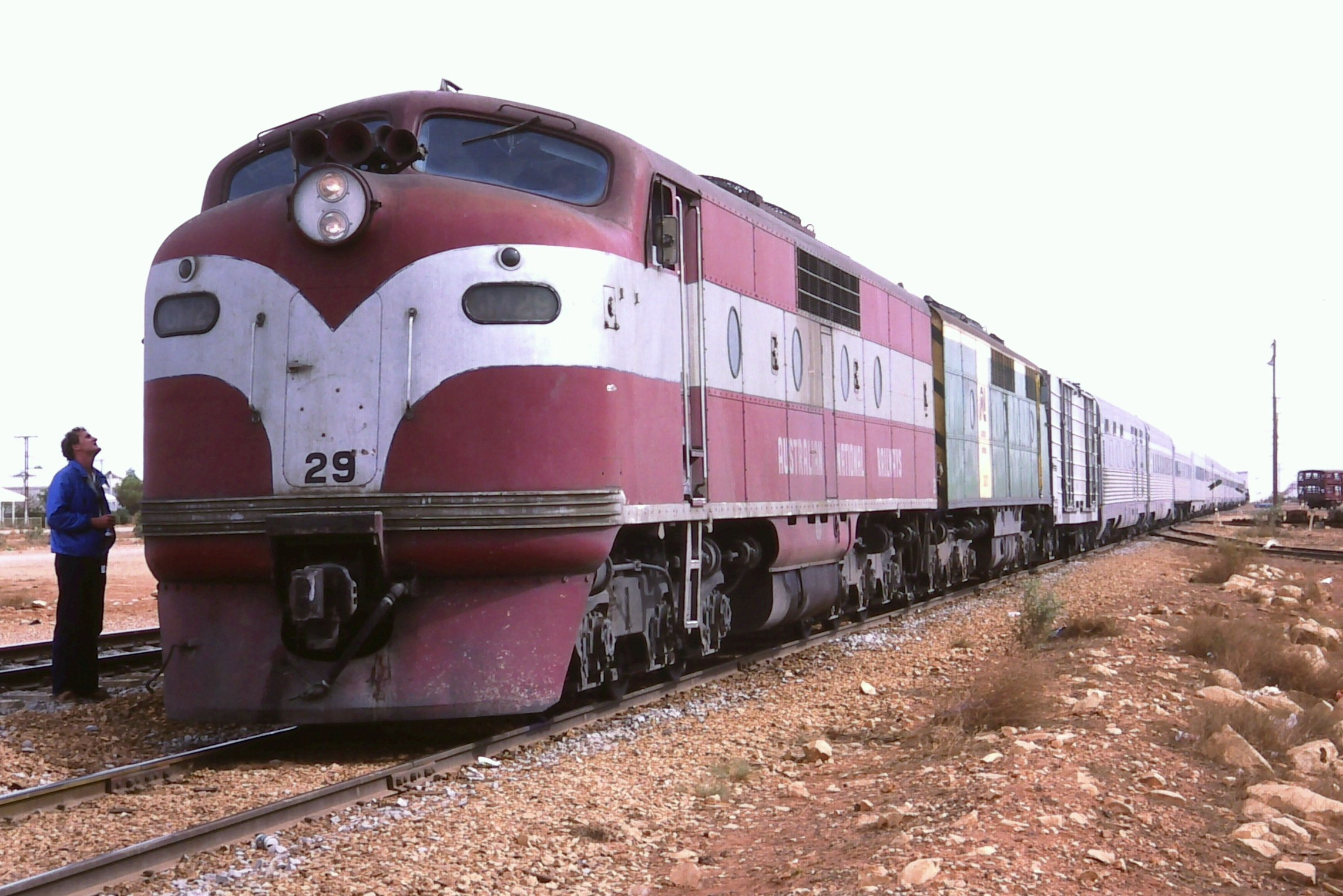
GM class on the Trans-Australian at Rawlinna in May 1986

The Trans-Australian Passenger train ran between Port Augusta and Kalgoorlie that commenced in 1917 and was still being operated by Australian National when it ceased in 1991.

== Fleet ==
For its standard gauge operations, Commonwealth Railways purchased G, K, KA, C, CA, CN and L class steam locomotives. From 1951, it purchased Clyde Engineering built GM and CL class diesel locomotives. It also purchased three CB railcars.

For its narrow gauge operations, NC, NSU, NT and NJ diesels were purchased to replace steam locomotives inherited from the South Australian Railways in 1911.

In 1936, the company owned 105 locomotives, 2 railcars, 67 coaches, 14 brake vans and over 1000 freight wagons.

== Commissioners ==
- 1917–1929 – Norris Garrett Bell
- 1929–1948 – George A. Gahan
- 1948–1960 – P. J. Hannaberry
- 1960–1975 – Keith Smith

== Demise ==
Australian National Railways was established by the Whitlam Federal Government following a commitment made in the 1972 election to invite the states to hand over their railway systems to the federal government. In July 1975, Australian National Railways was formed taking over the operations of Commonwealth Railways.

During the next two years, discussions between the state governments of South Australia and Tasmania and the federal government resulted in all South Australian Railways services (except the Adelaide metropolitan passenger network) and all Tasmanian Government Railways services transferring to Australian National Railway in March 1978, the latter being rebranded AN Tasrail.
