= Cook, South Australia =

Railway station in South Australia

Cook
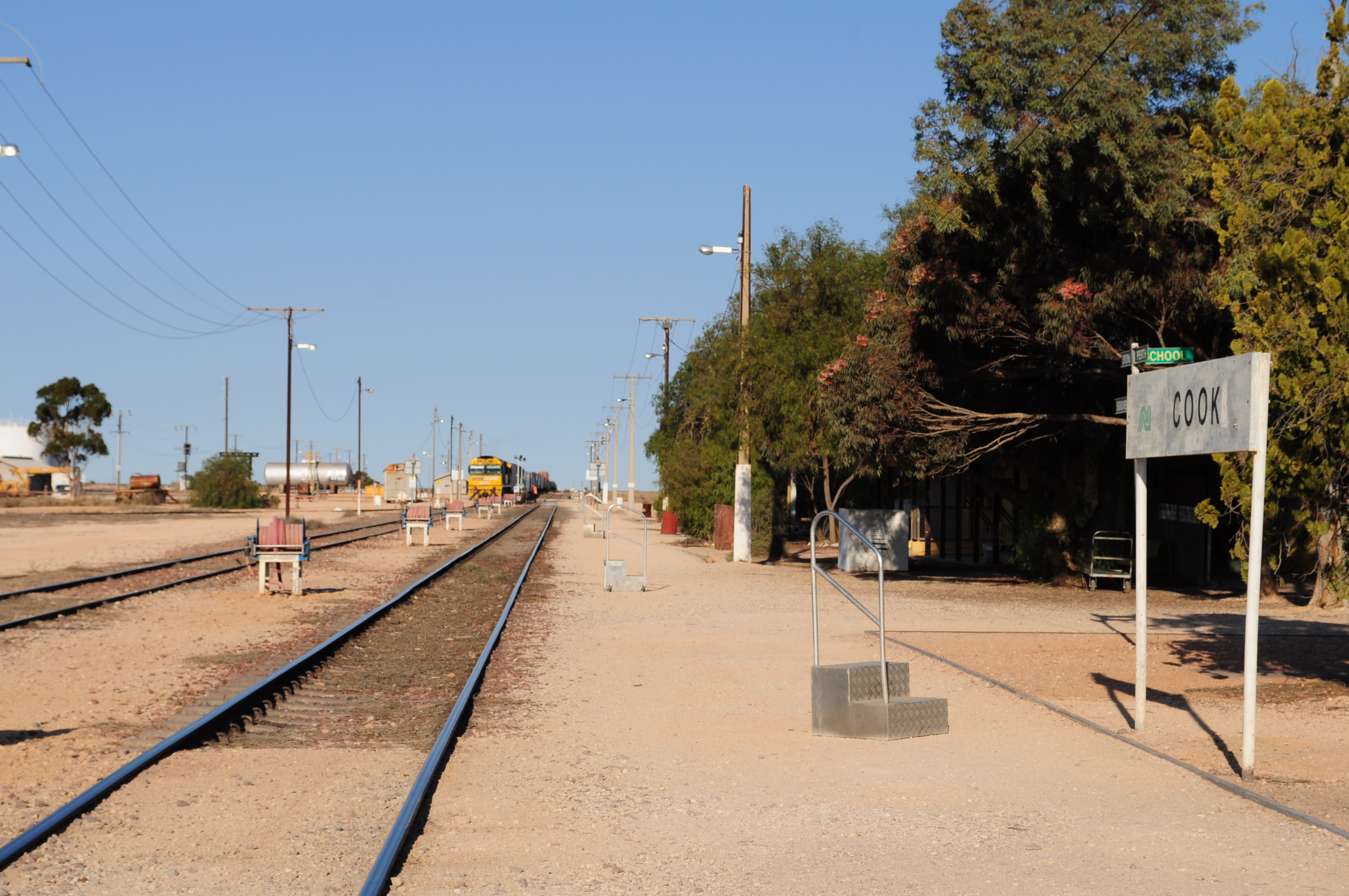
- Cook railway station in 2012

- Coordinates: 30°37′03″S 130°24′40″E
- Country: Australia
- State: South Australia
- Established: 1917
- Elevation: 120 m (390 ft)

Population
  - Total: 4 (2025)
- Time zone: UTC+9:30 (ACST)
  - Summer (DST): UTC+10:30 (ACDT)
- Postcode: N/A

Cook is a former railway town in South Australia. It is 824 kilometres (512 miles) by rail from Port Augusta, 863 kilometres (536 miles) by rail from Kalgoorlie, and about 100 kilometres (62 mi) north of the Eyre Highway via an unsealed road. It is on the longest stretch of straight railway in the world at 478 kilometres (297 mi).

== History ==
Cook was established by the Commonwealth Railways as a railway town in 1917 on the Nullarbor Plain when the Trans-Australian Railway was opened. It was named after former Prime Minister of Australia Joseph Cook.

The town was a major centre for track maintenance and locomotive and rolling stock repairs with over 50 employees. It had a general store, golf course, hospital, primary school and swimming pool. Railway employees and their families depended on the weekly Tea & Sugar provisions train for the delivery of supplies until it ceased running in 1996. When the town was populated, water was pumped from an underground artesian aquifer but later, all water was brought in by train.

In 1942, a prisoner of war camp was established in Cook with Italian prisoners assigned to work on the railway line.

From a population of 200, as at 2025 Cook had a resident population of four.

The reliability of modern diesel locomotives and the introduction of concrete sleepers and continuously welded rail rendered resident employees redundant. Track and facilities maintenance is undertaken by the Australian Rail Track Corporation with visiting crews staying in the seven houses that remain in the town.

Diesel refueling facilities remain for freight train services operated by Aurizon, Pacific National and SCT Logistics with overnight accommodation for resting train crews. Cook is a calling point for the Indian Pacific where it has a two hour layover in each direction to replenish fuel and water.

The crossing loop can cross trains up to 1.8 kilometres (1.1 miles) long. The former airstrip is known as a place to spot inland dotterel.

== Climate ==
Climate data for Cook, South Australia
Month	Jan	Feb	Mar	Apr	May	Jun	Jul	Aug	Sep	Oct	Nov	Dec	Year
Record high °C (°F)	48.7 (119.7)	46.7 (116.1)	46.5 (115.7)	41.1 (106.0)	36.0 (96.8)	30.0 (86.0)	34.2 (93.6)	33.6 (92.5)	39.0 (102.2)	43.5 (110.3)	46.5 (115.7)	46.3 (115.3)	48.7 (119.7)
Mean daily maximum °C (°F)	33.0 (91.4)	32.2 (90.0)	30.0 (86.0)	25.9 (78.6)	21.8 (71.2)	18.8 (65.8)	18.2 (64.8)	20.1 (68.2)	23.5 (74.3)	26.6 (79.9)	29.7 (85.5)	31.5 (88.7)	25.9 (78.7)
Mean daily minimum °C (°F)	15.0 (59.0)	15.3 (59.5)	13.7 (56.7)	10.9 (51.6)	7.8 (46.0)	5.4 (41.7)	4.3 (39.7)	5.1 (41.2)	7.2 (45.0)	9.5 (49.1)	11.9 (53.4)	13.9 (57.0)	10.0 (50.0)
Record low °C (°F)	4.5 (40.1)	4.4 (39.9)	4.5 (40.1)	2.0 (35.6)	−1.8 (28.8)	−3.8 (25.2)	−4.5 (23.9)	−3.3 (26.1)	−0.7 (30.7)	0.0 (32.0)	3.7 (38.7)	5.6 (42.1)	−4.5 (23.9)
Average rainfall mm (inches)	12.1 (0.48)	14.6 (0.57)	16.9 (0.67)	16.2 (0.64)	15.1 (0.59)	16.8 (0.66)	13.2 (0.52)	15.1 (0.59)	13.2 (0.52)	17.3 (0.68)	14.9 (0.59)	18.2 (0.72)	183.6 (7.23)
Source: Bureau of Meteorology

== In popular culture ==
The short 1955 film Nullarbor Hideout was set in and around Cook; the first scenes give a good impression of the railway line and infrastructure, and a sense of the townspeople's isolation and their dependence on the railway.
