= Commonwealth Railways GM class =

Class of diesel locomotives

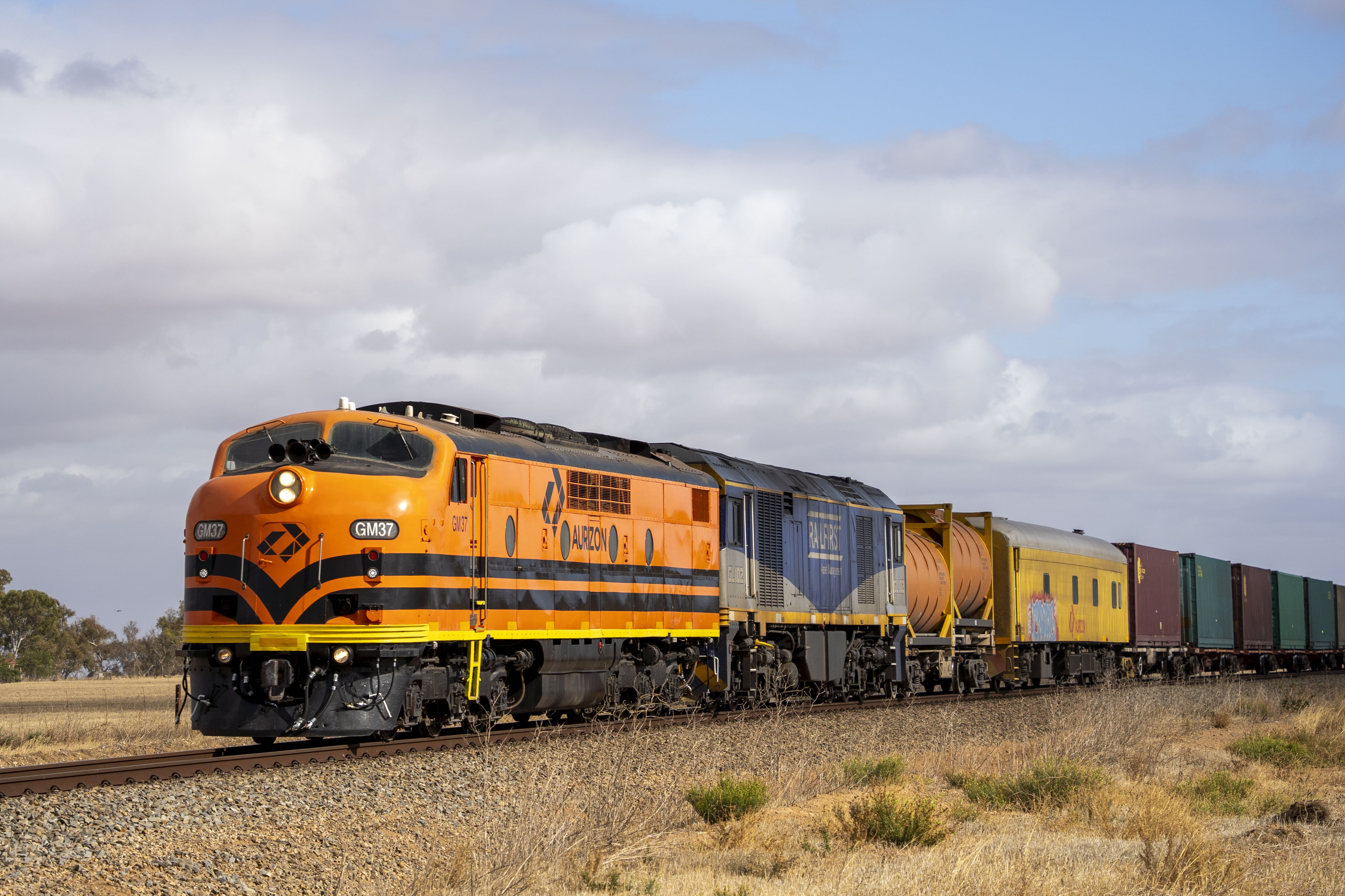
- Aurizon GM class locomotive leading a freight train in January 2025
Type and origin
- Power type: Diesel-electric
- Builder: Clyde Engineering, Granville
- Model: Electro-Motive Diesel ML1, later model A16C
- Build date: 1951-1967
- Total produced: 47
Specifications
- Configuration
  - UIC: GM1-11 A1A-A1A; GM12-47 Co-Co
- Gauge: 1,435 mm (4 ft 8 1/2 in) standard gauge
- Fuel type: Diesel
- Prime mover: EMD 16-567B [GM1 - GM11] EMD 16-567C [GM12 - GM47]
- Engine type: V16
- Cylinders: 16
Performance figures
- Power output: GM1-11 1,119 kW (1,501 hp), GM12-47 1,305 kW (1,750 hp)
Career
- Operators: Commonwealth Railways
- Number in class: 47
- Numbers: GM1-GM47
- Preserved: GM1, GM2, GM28, GM36
- Current owner: Aurizon; Southern Shorthaul Railroad
- Disposition: 6 in service, 2 preserved, 10 stored, 29 scrapped

The GM class are a class of diesel locomotives built by Clyde Engineering, Granville for the Commonwealth Railways in several batches between 1951 and 1967. As of July 2025, some remain in service with Aurizon and Southern Shorthaul Railroad.

== History ==
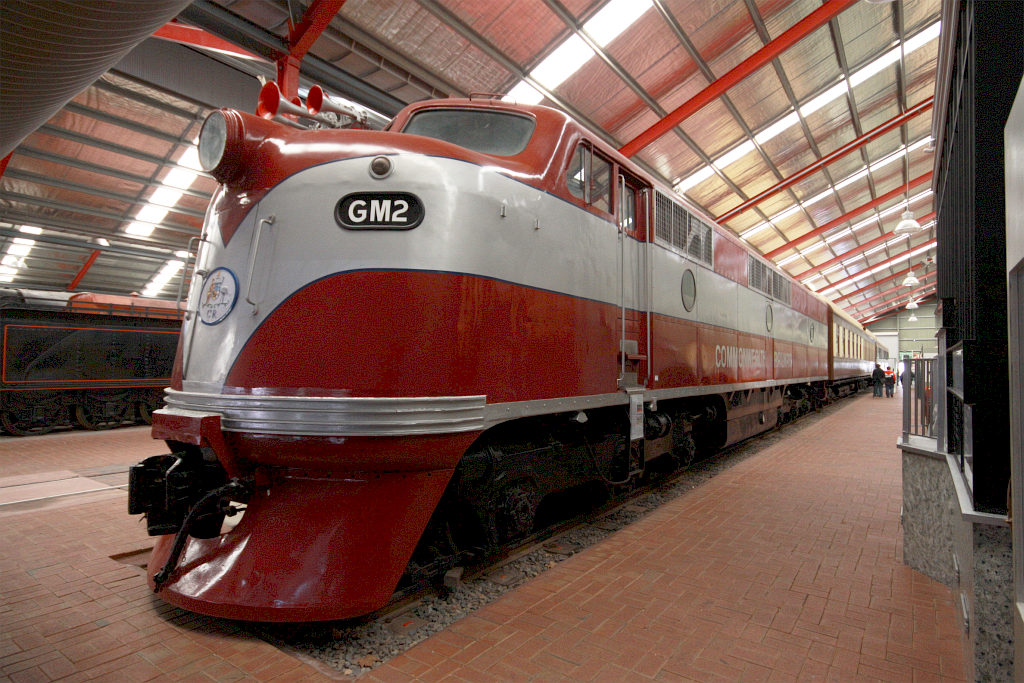
Preserved GM2 at the National Railway Museum in July 2010

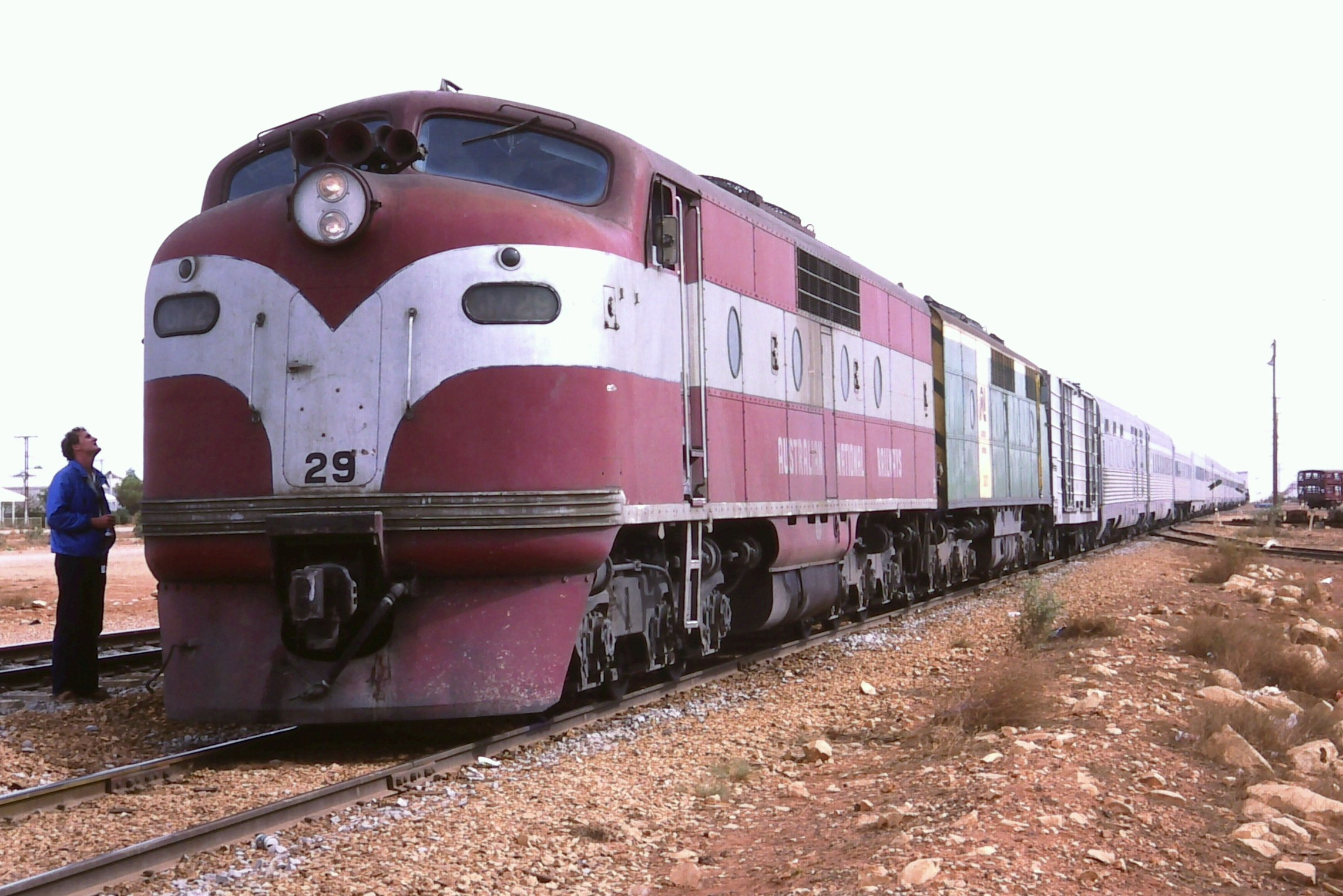
Two GM class on the Trans-Australian at Rawlinna in May 1986

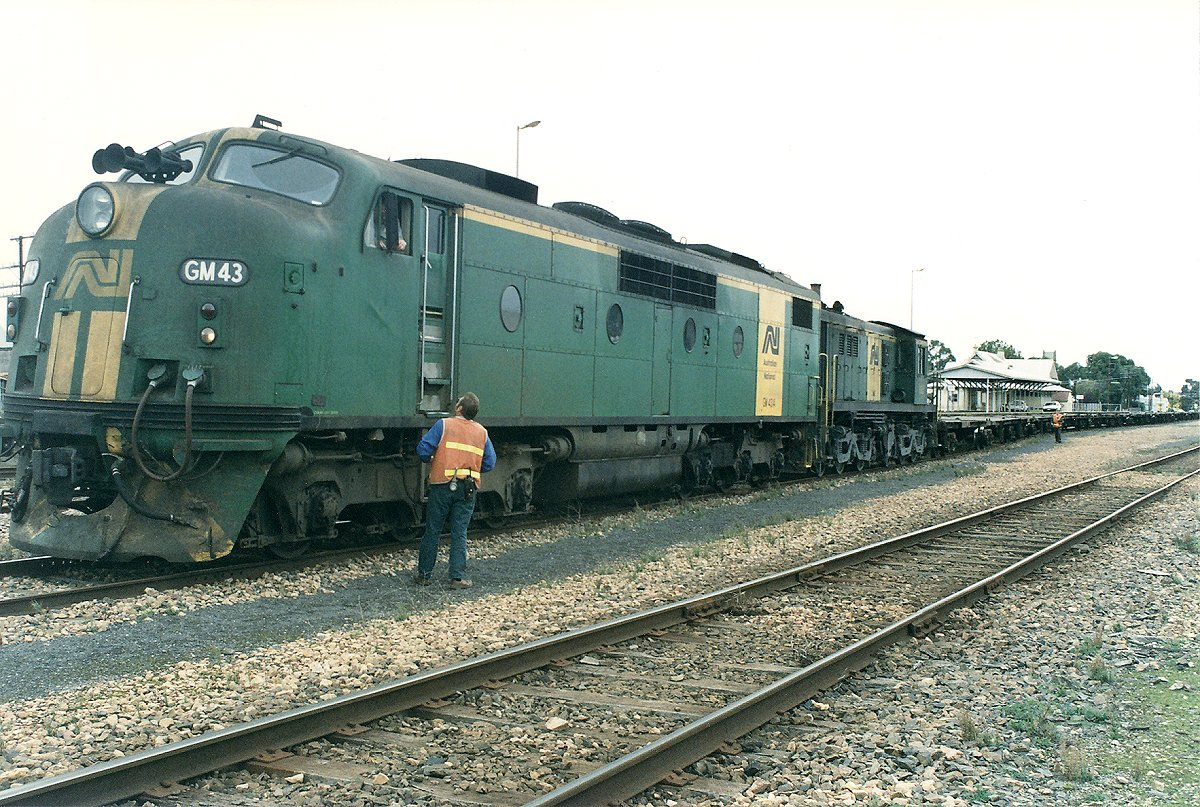
GM43 at Mount Gambier while on broad gauge in April 1995

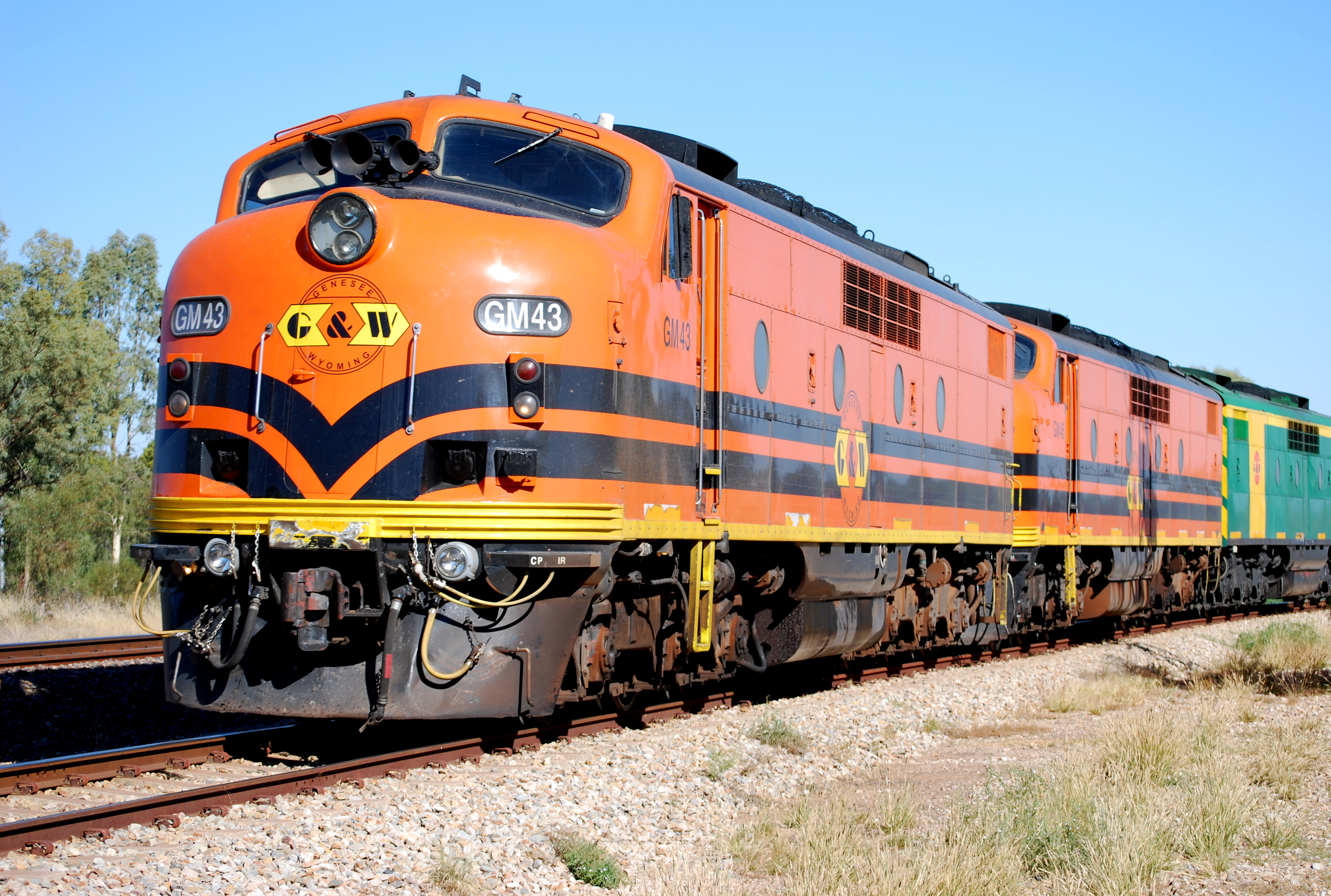
Aurizon GM43 locomotives

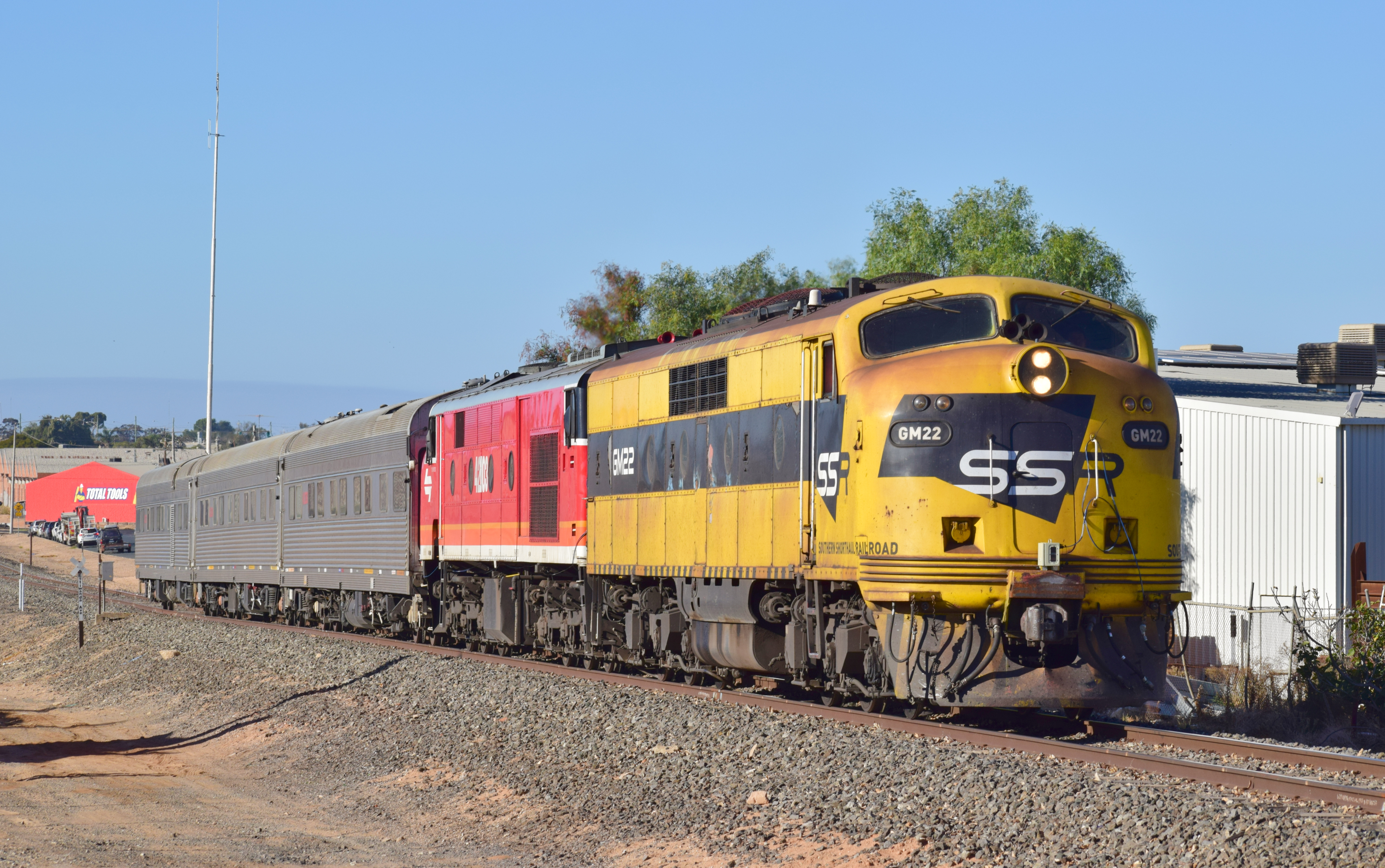
GM22 and 42103 lead the AK cars from Ouyen to Yelta through Mildura.

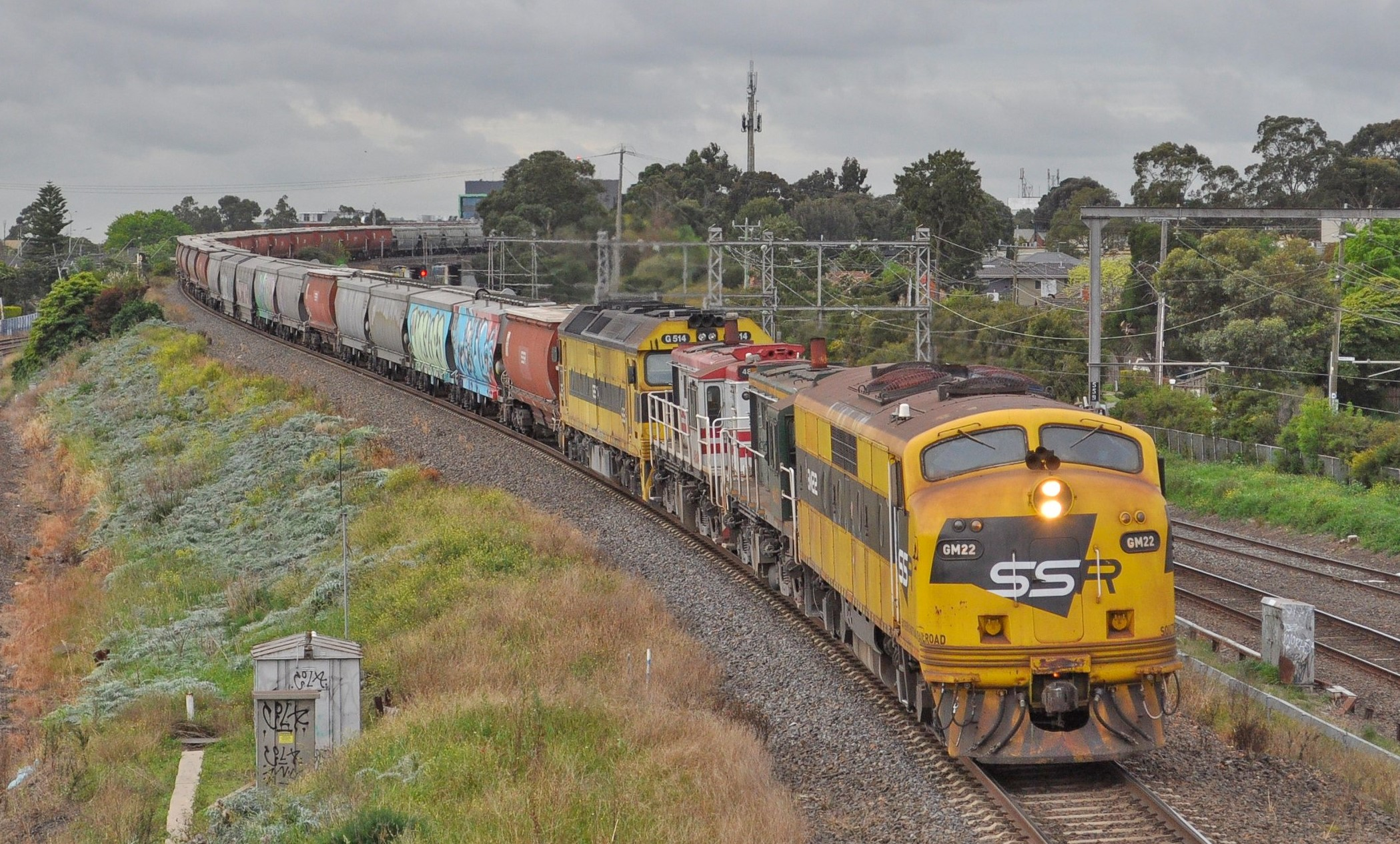
GM22, 48s35, 48s34, and G514 lead a grain train from Maldon NSW to Birchip at Jacana.

The design was based on the Electro-Motive Diesel EMD F7 locomotive. The first 11 were delivered with EMD 16-567B, 1,119 kW (1,501 hp) engines and four powered axles with the remainder having 16-567C, 1,305 kW (1,750 hp) engines and six powered axles. The final 11 were fitted with dynamic braking.

Delivered to operate on the standard gauge Trans-Australian Railway, they first entered service in September 1951. Further orders saw 47 in service by December 1967. They operated on all of Commonwealth Railways's standard gauge lines including those to Broken Hill, Alice Springs, Marree and Adelaide when converted to standard gauge in 1970, 1980 and 1982 respectively.

In January 1972, three (31, 32 & 34) were loaned to the Victorian Railways for use on the North East line, initially for only a six-month lease. After a year in Victorian Railways' service the mufflers on the engines were converted to the type fitted to local locomotives, in order to reduce sparks being emitted in the summer season. The latter two were returned in May 1976, the former in November 1976.

In July 1975, all were included in the transfer of Commonwealth Railways to Australian National. In 1979, a few operated to Lithgow, New South Wales on trials, while in October 1983, three (23, 24 & 28) were hired to V/Line returning in October 1985.

The GM class were manufactured for standard gauge use, some of the locomotives were converted to operate on 5 ft 3 in (1,600 mm) broad gauge for some of their lives.

Apart from one destroyed in an accident in 1985, withdrawals began in 1988. GM1 was placed on a plinth in Port Augusta, GM2 was donated to the National Railway Museum, Port Adelaide and GM3 to Clyde Engineering, Kelso. By October 1994, only 15 remained in service. A locomotive shortage saw Australian Southern Railroad return GM1 to service in December 1997.

In 1998, Great Northern Rail Services purchased 12 from Australian Southern Railroad. Most were scrapped for parts with only three returning to service seeing use in Melbourne and Sydney. Following Great Northern ceasing operations in 2003, these were sold to Chicago Freight Car Leasing Australia before being resold to Southern Shorthaul Railroad.

In May 2005, Australian Railroad Group forwarded GM30 to Forrestfield workshops to be receive a 2,237 kW (3,000 hp) engine, as fitted to the CLs. The project was never completed and the shell was scrapped.

In November 2010, the Department for Infrastructure & Transport placed GM1 in the custody of Rail Heritage WA. In May 2012, Clyde Engineering sold GM3 to Southern Shorthaul Railroad and it was transferred to their Lithgow State Mine Heritage Park & Railway workshop for overhaul.

As of October 2023, all but 1 of the Aurizon units are operational due to more modern power available for freight services in South Australia With 3 Stored Operational while the Southern Shorthaul Railroad units are used on infrastructure and grain trains in New South Wales and Victoria.

GM10 is the oldest locomotive in regular freight service in Australia.

== Aurizon ownership ==
After the ARG split up G&W retained 11 GMs (ARG retaining GM30 for an ambitious project but was then scrapped) They regularly worked grain trains in SA on the pinaroo line; after its closure some of the fleet were stored (GM32 & GM34 being scrapped and GM44 being stored at Port Augusta). Over the years the fleet was stored at Dry Creek until ORA ownership; in 2022 ORA experienced a loco shortage and brought some back into service. Later in the year Aurizon bought ORA and the GMs became shunters. They currently work in these positions:

GM32 - Scrapped

GM34 - Scrapped

GM37 - Operational Pt Augusta (Fitted with ICE radio)

GM38 - Stored Dry Creek

GM40 - Stored Dry Creek

GM42 - Stored Dry Creek

GM43 - Stored Dry Creek

GM44 - Stored Port Augusta

GM45 - Stored Dry Creek

GM46 - Operational Dry Creek (Fitted with ICE radio)

GM47 - Stored Whyalla (Fitted with ICE radio)

== Status table ==
Key:	In service	Stored	Preserved	Converted	Under Overhaul	Scrapped

Locomotive	Entered service	Current Owner	Livery	Status
GM1	September 1951	Rail Heritage WA	CR Maroon/Silver	Under Overhaul
GM2	November 1951	National Railway Museum	CR Maroon/Silver	Static Display
GM3	December 1951	Southern Shorthaul Railroad	CR Maroon/Silver	Stored
GM4	January 1952	Australian National	Australian National green & yellow	Scrapped
GM5	January 1952	Australian National	Australian National green & yellow	Scrapped
GM6	February 1952	Australian National	Australian National green & yellow	Scrapped
GM7	March 1952	Australian National	Australian National green & yellow	Scrapped
GM8	March 1952	Australian National	Australian National green & yellow	Scrapped
GM9	April 1952	Australian National	Australian National green & yellow	Scrapped
GM10	June 1952	Southern Shorthaul Railroad	SSR Yellow	Operational
GM11	July 1952	Australian National	Australian National green & yellow	Scrapped
GM12	October 1955	Southern Shorthaul Railroad	Australian National green & yellow	Scrapped
GM13	November 1955	Australian National	Australian National green & yellow	Scrapped
GM14	April 1956	Australian National	Australian National green & yellow	Scrapped
GM15	April 1956	Australian National	Australian National green & yellow	Scrapped
GM16	July 1956	Australian National	Australian National green & yellow	Scrapped
GM17	March 1957	Australian National	Australian National green & yellow	Scrapped
GM18	April 1957	Australian National	Australian National green & yellow	Scrapped
GM19	May 1957	Railpower	Australian National green & yellow	Under Overhaul
GM20	June 1957	Australian National	Australian National green & yellow	Scrapped
GM21	July 1957	Australian National	Australian National green & yellow	Scrapped
GM22	July 1962	Southern Shorthaul Railroad	SSR Yellow	Operational
GM23	August 1962	Australian National	Australian National green & yellow	Scrapped
GM24	September 1962	Australian National	Australian National green & yellow	Scrapped
GM25	October 1962	Australian National	Australian National green & yellow	Scrapped
GM26	November 1962	Australian National	Australian National green & yellow	Scrapped
GM27	January 1963	Southern Shorthaul Railroad	DP World Wrap	Operational
GM28	February 1963	Seymour Railway Heritage Centre	CR Maroon/Silver	Engine removed & replaced with a mancave
GM29	March 1963	Australian National	Australian National green & yellow	Scrapped
GM30	December 1964	Australian National	Australian National green & yellow	Scrapped
GM31	January 1965	Australian National	Australian National green & yellow	Scrapped
GM32	January 1965	Aurizon	Australian National green & yellow	Scrapped
GM33	March 1965	Australian National	Australian National green & yellow	Scrapped
GM34	April 1965	Aurizon	Australian National green & yellow	Scrapped
GM35	April 1966	Australian National	Australian National green & yellow	Scrapped
GM36	May 1966	Seymour Railway Heritage Centre	CR Maroon/Silver	Under Overhaul
GM37	June 1966	Aurizon	ORA Orange With Aurizon Logos	Operational
GM38	June 1966	Aurizon	Australian National green & yellow	Stored
GM39	July 1966	Australian National	Australian National green & yellow	Scrapped
GM40	January 1967	Aurizon	Australian National green & yellow	Stored
GM41	February 1967	Australian National	Australian National green & yellow	Scrapped
GM42	February 1967	Aurizon	ORA Orange	Stored
GM43	March 1967	Aurizon	ORA Orange	Stored
GM44	April 1967	Aurizon	ORA Orange	Stored
GM45	May 1967	Aurizon	ORA Orange	Stored
GM46	June 1967	Aurizon	Australian National green & yellow	Operational
GM47	December 1967	Aurizon	ORA Orange	Stored
