= Trans-Australian Railway =

Railway between Port Augusta and Kalgoorlie in Australia

Route map
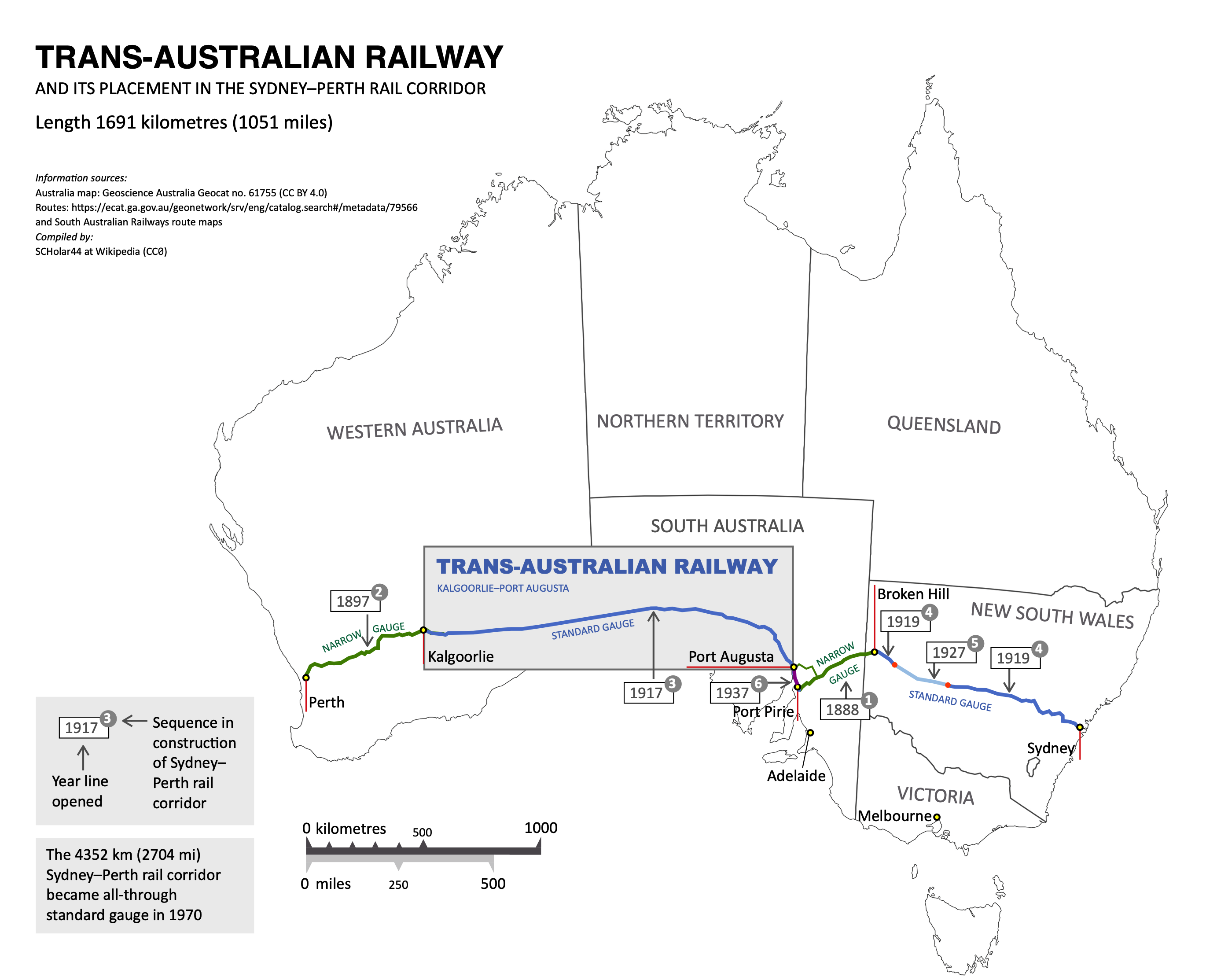

The Trans-Australian Railway, opened in 1917, runs from Port Augusta in South Australia to Kalgoorlie in Western Australia, crossing the Nullarbor Plain in the process. Built to 1435 mm (4 ft 8 1/2 in) standard gauge, its length is 1691 kilometres (1051 miles). As the only rail freight corridor between Western Australia and the eastern states, the line is economically and strategically important. The railway includes the world's longest section of completely straight track.

The inaugural passenger train service was known as the Great Western Express; later, it became the Trans-Australian.

Until 1970, the Trans-Australian Railway linked to pre-existing 1067 mm (3 ft 6 in) narrow-gauge lines at each end. With the completion of a standardisation project in that year, it became a component of the 4352 kilometres (2704 miles) Sydney–Perth rail corridor. As of 2024, two passenger services use the line, both of them experiential tourism services: the Indian Pacific for the entire length of the railway, and The Ghan between Port Augusta and Tarcoola, where it leaves the line to proceed north to Darwin.

== History ==
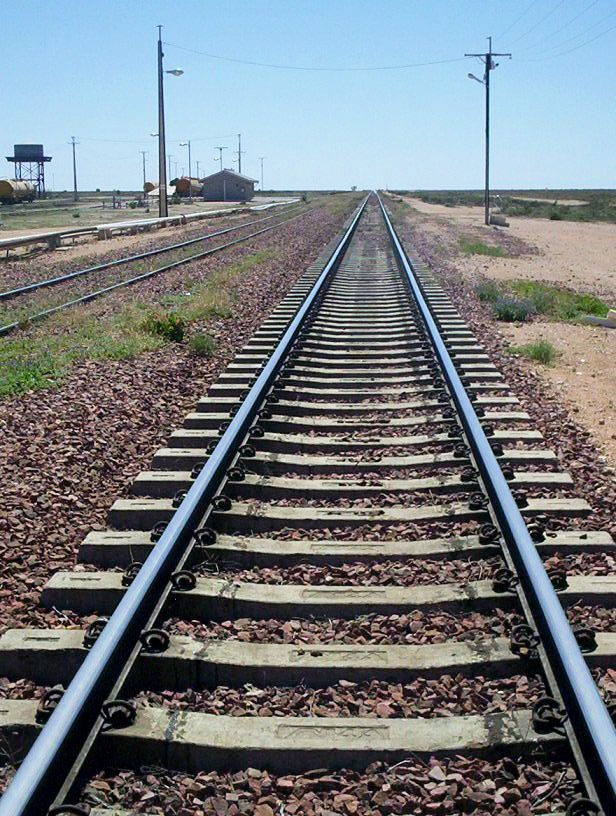
The single-track Trans-Australian Railway at Cook, once a major servicing point. When continuous welded rail, reinforced concrete sleepers and spring rail fasteners were installed on top of deeper ballast, maintenance requirements were drastically reduced. Contractors using modern track maintenance machinery replaced onsite maintenance crews and employees did not need permanent accommodation, so the stations were closed.

In 1901, the six Australian colonies federated to form the Commonwealth of Australia. At that time, Perth, the capital of Western Australia, was isolated from the remaining Australian states by thousands of kilometres of desert terrain and the only practicable method of transport was by sea. The voyage across the notoriously rough Great Australian Bight was time-consuming, inconvenient and often uncomfortable. One of the inducements held out to Western Australians to join the new federation was the promise of a federally funded railway line linking Western Australia with the rest of the continent.

In 1907, legislation was passed, allowing for the route to be surveyed. The survey, completed in 1909, endorsed a route from Port Augusta (the existing railhead at the head of Spencer Gulf in South Australia's wheatfields) via Tarcoola to the gold mining centre of Kalgoorlie in Western Australia, a distance of 1,063 miles (1,711 km). The line was to be built to the standard gauge of 4 ft 8 1/2 in (1,435 mm), even though the state railway systems at both ends were narrow gauge at the time. Its cost was estimated at £4,045,000, equivalent to A$642 million in 2022.

Legislation authorising the construction was passed in December 1911 by the Fisher Commonwealth Government. Work commenced in September 1912 in Port Augusta.

Work proceeded eastwards from Kalgoorlie and westwards from Port Augusta through the years of the First World War. Tracklaying proceeded briskly when materials were available. At its peak, up to 2 1/2 miles (4.0 km) of track were laid each day, and 442 miles (711 km) were completed in one calendar year – both Australian tracklaying records. By 1915, the two ends of the line were just over 600 miles (966 km) apart with materials being delivered daily. Construction progressed steadily as the line was extended through mainly dry and desolate regions until the two halves of the line met at Ooldea on 17 October 1917.

Under the aegis of the federal department of transport, the Commonwealth Railways was established in 1917 to operate the line. Once passenger trains started to run, maintenance staff found that the high mineral salt content of bore water available along the route was playing havoc with steam locomotive boilers: repairs to boilers at one time accounted for an extraordinary 87 per cent of all locomotive maintenance. The problem was only arrested with the introduction of barium carbonate water treatment plants at watering points.

In 1937, the eastern end was extended 90 kilometres (56 miles) south to Port Pirie. Soon afterwards, the South Australian Railways extended its 1,600 mm (5 ft 3 in) broad-gauge line 47 km (29 mi) north to Port Pirie from Redhill. These two projects made redundant the indirect 290 kilometres (180 miles), 1,067 mm (3 ft 6 in) narrow-gauge connection from Terowie via Peterborough and Quorn, resulting in a much shorter and more comfortable journey to Adelaide. These two projects eliminated one break of gauge in the journey across Australia, but they turned Port Pirie Junction yard into a complex three-gauge facility. Railway engineers, however, were able to construct the new yards with no more than minimal dual-gauge track and the complex signalling that would have been incurred.

The long-anticipated conversion of the entire line between Sydney and Perth to standard gauge occurred in 1970.

In 2004, the gap in standard gauge connections between the mainland state capitals was finally closed with a connection between Port Pirie and Adelaide, thence Melbourne, and by completion of the northern component of the Adelaide–Darwin railway line, which diverges from the Trans–Australian Railway at Tarcoola.

In 2008, the engineering heritage of the railway was recognised by the Engineering Heritage Recognition Program of Engineers Australia when markers were installed on the platform at the Port Augusta station in South Australia and the ticket office at Kalgoorlie station in Western Australia.

On 17 October 2017, centenary celebrations were held at Ooldea.

== Named services ==
When the line was inaugurated, the passenger service was named as the Great Western Express. Later, the train became known as the Trans-Australian or, colloquially, "The Trans". After the Sydney–Perth route was converted to standard gauge in 1970, the railway was no longer flanked at both ends by narrow-gauge lines and an all-through service, called the Indian Pacific, was started. Although passengers no longer had to move to different carriages at change-of-gauge localities, Commonwealth Railways remained responsible for the service where it operated between Port Pirie and Kalgoorlie, with its crews and locomotives taking over at those stations. In 1975, Commonwealth Railways was absorbed into an enlarged federal government corporation, Australian National Railways Commission, branded as Australian National Railways and later as "Australian National", which continued to operate the Trans Australian. In 1993, Australian National took over operation of the entire coast-to-coast service following agreement with the governments of Western Australia and New South Wales.

In 1997, following the privatisation of Australian National, the Indian Pacific was sold to a company, Great Southern Rail (as of 2020 trading as "Journey Beyond"). As of 2020, the Indian Pacific is a weekly, all-through, experiential tourism service.

From the start of construction until 1996, the Tea and Sugar supply train carried vital provisions to the work sites and localities, all of them isolated, along the route: a butcher and banking and postal services were among the facilities provided.

== Terrain ==
The length of the line, as constructed, was 1051.73 mi (1692.60 km), slightly less than the original survey.

Although there are several hundred curves and gradients on the line, the route includes the longest length of straight track in the world, at 478.193 kilometres (297.135 miles). (Note: In the original survey of the track in the early 1900s, the length was recorded as 297 miles, 8.5 chains – equating to 478.147 kilometres (297.107 miles). In 1990, using recently acquired Global Positioning System (GPS) capabilities, Geoscience Australia measured the length as 478.193 kilometres, a difference of only 46 metres (50 yards).) A Commonwealth Railways map marked the western end as 793 miles (1,276 km) from Port Augusta, between Loongana and Nurina, and states: "The 'Long Straight' extends from this point for a distance of 297 miles and terminates at the 496 miles [sic] between Ooldea and Watson." (Note: The metric equivalents to the mileages on the map are: western end 1276.2 km from Port Augusta, eastern end 798.2 km from Port Augusta; length 478.0 km. Details measured via Google Earth are: western end 30°58′33″S 126°40′07″E, eastern end 30°28′10″S 131°37′37″E – a distance of 478.193 km.)

According to South Australian astronaut Andy Thomas, the line is identifiable from space because of its unnatural straightness: "It's a very fine line, it's like someone has drawn a very fine pencil line across the desert".

At no point along the route does the line cross a permanent fresh watercourse. Bores and reservoirs were established at intervals, but the water was often brackish and unsuitable for steam locomotive use, let alone human consumption, so water supplies had to be carried on the train. In the days of steam locomotion, about half the total load was water for the engine. In later years, condenser plants were built at several major stations.

== Names of stopping places ==
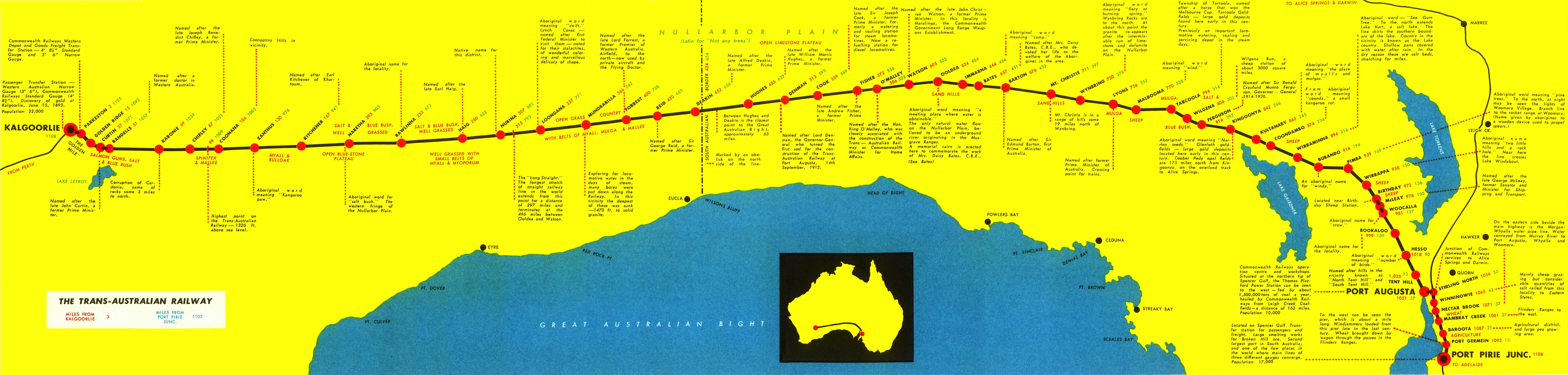
A map on one side of a leaflet provided to passengers showing all localities on the Trans-Australian Railway at the time and the origins of their names (click to enlarge)

Reflecting the line's ownership by the Commonwealth Government, eight of the localities were named (or renamed) after Australian Prime Ministers. Other prominent people's names were also allocated, as shown on the adjacent map.

== Operations ==
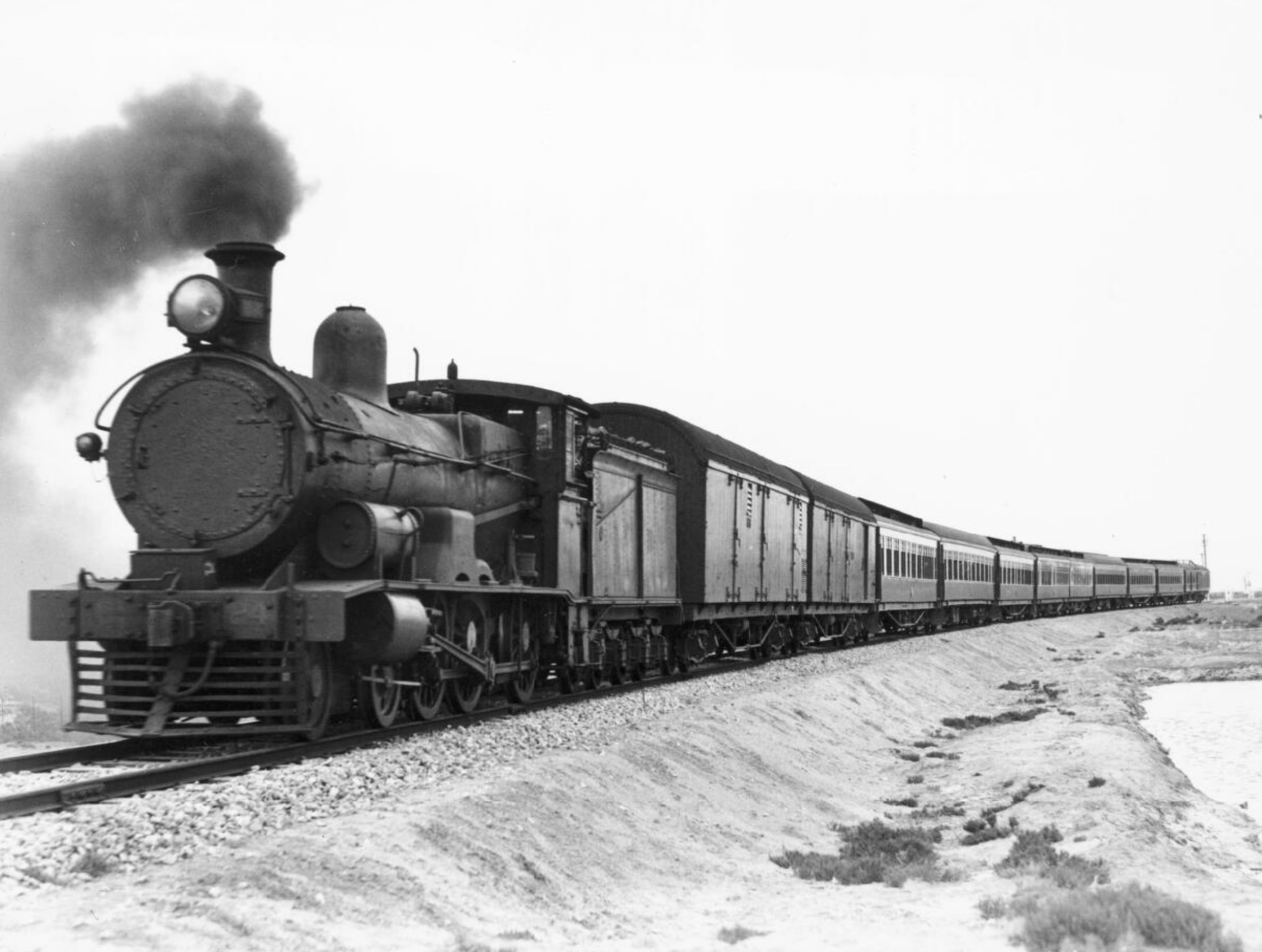
The Trans-Australian proceeding from Port Pirie Junction to Port Augusta and Western Australia in 1938, soon after the Trans-Australian Railway was extended to Port Pirie

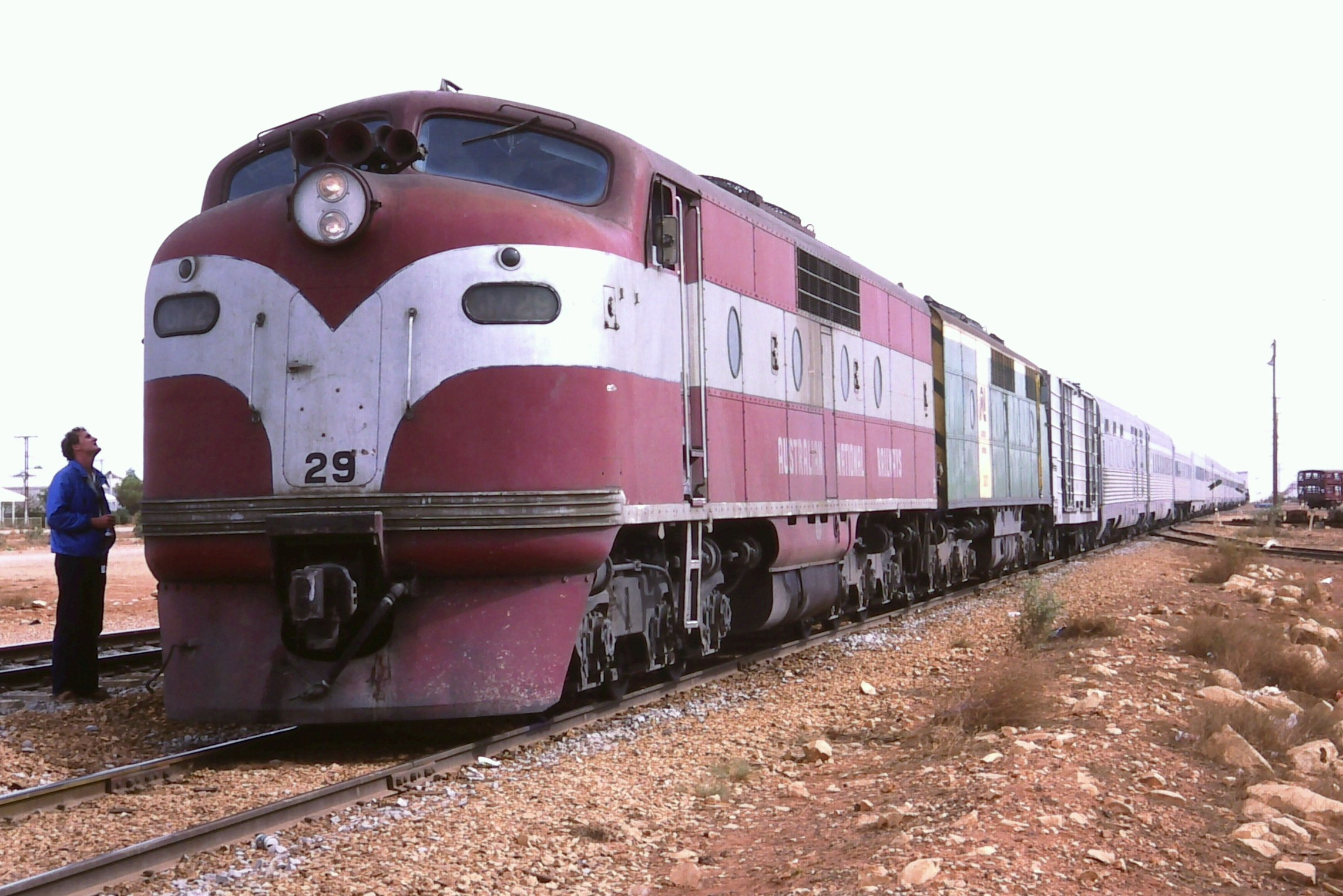
In 1986 the Trans-Australian at Rawlinna, WA is bound for Port Pirie. It would be another 18 years before all mainland state capitals were connected by standard gauge tracks.

Because of the inevitable problems of finding suitable water for steam locomotives in a desert, the original engineer, Henry Deane envisaged diesel locomotives for the line and made inquiries with potential manufacturers, although the technology was not well developed at the time. Unfortunately, a scandal involving the supply of sleepers led to Deane's resignation before the proposal had advanced.

Initially trains were hauled by G class locomotives and from 1938 by C class locomotives, both steam. From 1951, diesel-electric locomotives hauled passenger services, using the new GM class locomotives.

The railway originally had 400 m (1,300 ft)-long crossing loops (passing sidings) every 100 km (62 mi) or so. As traffic increased the number of crossing loops increased. To handle longer trains, crossing loops were lengthened so that in 2008 they were all at least 1,800 m (5,900 ft) long and spaced about 30 km (19 mi) to 60 km (37 mi) apart.

Most crossing loops are unattended and train crew operate the turnouts as required. Crossing loops have self-restoring points, so that points are reset to the straight route when a train departs from a crossing loop. The loops are fitted with radio controls so that train crew can set the points as they approach. Locomotive cabs are fitted with an activated points system (ICAPS) to set the required route without having to stop the train.

Safeworking is by train orders between Parkeston and Cook with the Parkeston controller,, and between Cook and Tarcoola with the Cook controller. The section between Tarcoola and Port Augusta is controlled by signals.

== Disruptions ==
In the time of the operation of the railway, 'washaways' and 'flooding' in most cases rendered the railway inoperable at a range of locations. Washaways usually removed ballast, leaving rails suspended above the flooding areas.

In most cases the underlying ballast was removed, and required replacing. Significant events on the line were in 1921, 1930, 1937 and 2022. The 1930 flooding delayed two trains on sections of the line.

== See also ==
- Transcontinental railroad

== Sources ==
- Brennan-Mills, Maddison (21 November 2026). "Geography Facts That'll Completely Ruin Every Map You've Ever Trusted". News.com.au. "The longest straight stretch of railway in the world is on the Nullarbor, where the Trans-Australian Railway runs 478 km without a single bend."

== Select bibliography ==
- Adam-Smith, Patsy (1974) The Desert Railway. Adelaide: Rigby ISBN 0-85179-675-3
- Anchen, Nick (2017). Iron Roads in the Outback: The Legendary Commonwealth Railways. Ferntree Gully, Vic: Sierra Publishing. ISBN 9780992538828.
- Avery, Rod (2006). Freight Across the Nation: The Australian Superfreighter Experience. Brisbane: Copyright Publishing Co. ISBN 1876344474.
- Buckland, J.L. (1965) Canadian and American Locomotives in Wartime Service on the Trans-Australian Railway Australian Railway Historical Society Bulletin, September 1965.
- Burke, David, (1991) Road Through the Wilderness: The Story of the Transcontinental Railway, the First Great Work of Australia's Federation. Kensington, N.S.W.: New South Wales University Press. ISBN 0-86840-140-4
- Cree, Patricia (2012). The Trans-Australian Railway: Bringing the nation together. Canberra Airport, ACT: Australasian Railway Association. ISBN 9780646584249.
- Henshaw, C.H. (1964) Overland to Perth in 1928 Australian Railway Historical Society Bulletin, April 1964.
- Luke, Monte (1997). Riders of the Steel Highways: The History of Australia's Commonwealth Railways 1912-1975. Port Augusta, SA: VM & BM Luke. ISBN 0646346520.
- Spear, R. Clarke (1917) The Golden West: Trans-Australian Christmas number Perth, Western Australia "The Golden West, Vol. 13, December 1917."
