= Pirie =

Pirie is a Scottish surname of French origin, meaning "pear tree".

People with the name include:

- Alexander Fraser Pirie (1849–1903), Canadian journalist and newspaper editor
- Antoinette Pirie (1905–1991), British biochemist
- Billy Pirie (1949–2025), Scottish footballer
- Bob Pirie (1916–1984), Canadian swimmer and three time Olympic gold medalist
- Brad Pirie (born 1955), Canadian former ice hockey player
- Charles Pirie (1897–1960), Scottish chess player
- Daphne Pirie (1931–2022), Australian athlete and sports administrator
- David Pirie, English screenwriter, film producer, critic and novelist
- Denis Pirie (fl. 1960s–1980s), British far right politician
- Douglas J. Pirie (c. 1907–1935) English motorcycle racer
- Duncan Pirie (1858–1931), Scottish Liberal politician
- Elizabeth Pirie (1932–2005), British numismatist and museum curator
- George Pirie (disambiguation)
- Gordon Pirie (1931–1991), English long-distance runner and orienteerer
- Harvey Pirie (1878–1965), Scottish bacteriologist
- Irene Pirie (1914–1998), Canadian freestyle swimmer
- Jacqueline Pirie (born 1975), Scottish actress
- James Pirie (1853–1934), Major League Baseball shortstop
- Jane Pirie (1779–1833), Scottish educator
- Sir John Pirie, 1st Baronet (died 1851), alderman and Lord Mayor of the city of London
- John Pirie (MP) (died 1402 or later), Member of Parliament for Canterbury, Kent in 1401
- Julia Pirie (1918–2008), British MI5 spy
- Lockwood Pirie (1904–1965), American competitive sailor
- Madsen Pirie (born 1940), British researcher, author and educator
- Mark Pirie (born 1974), New Zealand poet, writer, literary critic, publisher and editor
- Morag Pirie (born 1975), Scottish football referee
- Norman Pirie (1907–1997), British biochemist
- Peter J. Pirie (1916–1997), English musicologist and critic
- Robert Pirie (disambiguation)
- Tom Pirie (1896–1966), Scottish footballer
- William Robinson Pirie (1804–1885), Scottish minister and educator

== See also ==
- Piri (disambiguation)
- Pirrie, a surname, including a list of people
- Jacob Piry (1920–?), Indonesian politician
- John Pirie (ship), built in 1827, sailed to South Australia 1836
