= John Pirie (disambiguation) =

John Pirie may refer to:

- Sir John Pirie, 1st Baronet (1781–1851), British shipbroker and Lord Mayor of London
- John Pirie (MP) (fl. 1401), English member of parliament for Canterbury, Kent
- John Pirie (ship) built 1827, part of the First Fleet of South Australia in 1836
