= Port Pirie (disambiguation) =

Port Pirie is a city in South Australia.

Port Pirie may also refer to:

- City of Port Pirie, a former local government area in South Australia
- Electoral district of Port Pirie, a former state electoral district
- Port Pirie Regional Council, a local government area in South Australia
- Port Pirie Post Office, a post office in South Australia
- Port Pirie Airport, airport in South Australia
- Roman Catholic Diocese of Port Pirie, a diocese in South Australia

== See also ==
- Port Pirie railway station (disambiguation)
- Pirie (disambiguation)
- Port Pirie South, South Australia
- St Mark's Cathedral, Port Pirie
- Sir John Pirie, 1st Baronet
