= Petrel Cove =

Petrel Cove may refer to:

- Petrel Cove, Antarctica
- Petrel Cove, South Australia
