= List of shipwrecks in December 1837 =

The list of shipwrecks in December 1837 includes ships sunk, foundered, wrecked, grounded, or otherwise lost during December 1837.

== 1 December ==
List of shipwrecks: 1 December 1837
Ship	State	Description
Bon Père	France	The ship was wrecked on the St. Lazaro Reef. She was on a voyage from Laguna to Havana, Cuba.
Cornelius	United Kingdom	The ship was driven ashore near "St. James's Castle. She was on a voyage from Malta to Smyrna, Ottoman Empire. Cornelius was later refloated and resumed her voyage.
Haabet	Denmark	The ship was driven ashore at "Naderoe". She was on a voyage from Bristol, Gloucestershire, United Kingdom to Copenhagen.
Indian	United Kingdom	The ship was driven ashore on Terschelling, Friesland, Netherlands. She was on a voyage from Riga, Russia to London.
Maria Agnes	United Kingdom	The ship was driven ashore on the Seaton Rocks. She was later refloated and taken into South Shields, County Durham.

== 2 December ==
List of shipwrecks: 2 December 1837
Ship	State	Description
John	United Kingdom	The ship was driven ashore and severely damaged at Wick, Caithness. She was refloated the next day and taken into Wick.
Means	United Kingdom	The ship was wrecked on Scroby Sands, Norfolk. Her crew survived. She floated off on 4 December and came ashore at Great Yarmouth, Norfolk
Melantho	United Kingdom	The ship was wrecked at Veracruz, Mexico.

== 3 December ==
List of shipwrecks: 3 December 1837
Ship	State	Description
Britannia	(United Kingdom of Great Britain and Ireland) Jersey	The ship ran aground at Flamborough Head, Yorkshire. She was on a voyage from London to South Shields, County Durham. Britannia was refloated and taken into Bridlington, Yorkshire.
Emelie Constantia	Duchy of Holstein	The ship was driven ashore at "Hogen". She was on a voyage from Saint Thomas, Virgin Islands to Flensburg.
Swallow	United Kingdom	The ship was in collision with a brig off Padstow, Cornwall. Both vessels sank. The crew of Swallow were rescued by Lord Nelson (United Kingdom). Swallow was on a voyage from Neath, Glamorgan to Teignmouth, Devon.

== 4 December ==
List of shipwrecks: 4 December 1837
Ship	State	Description
Maid of Bute	United Kingdom	The paddle steamer caught fire at Rothesay, Isle of Bute and was severely damaged.

== 5 December ==
List of shipwrecks: 5 December 1837
Ship	State	Description
Jane	United Kingdom	The ship sank in Dundrum Bay with the loss of two of her crew.
Vasco de Gama	Portugal	The ship was driven ashore at "Osterlit". Her crew were rescued. She was on a voyage from Porto to Hamburg.

== 6 December ==
List of shipwrecks: 6 December 1837
Ship	State	Description
Colte	France	The ship departed from Havre de Grâce, Seine-Inférieure for New York. No further trace, presumed foundered with the loss of all hands.
Dauntless	United Kingdom	The ship was driven ashore at Cuxhaven. She was on a voyage from Hamburg to Bridlington, Yorkshire. Dauntless was refloated on 9 December and proceeded with her voyage.
Merchant	United States	The ship was driven ashore in the Mississippi River downstream of New Orleans, Louisiana.
New England	United States	The ship was driven ashore in the Mississippi River downstream of New Orleans.

== 7 December ==
List of shipwrecks: 7 December 1837
Ship	State	Description
Jules et Eugenie	Belgium	The fishing vessel was wrecked south of Lybster, Caithness, United Kingdom. Her six crew were rescued.
Mary White	United Kingdom	The ship struck the Kentish Knock and was then driven ashore at Harwich, Essex. She was on a voyage from Onega, Russia to Gloucester. Mary White was refloated on 9 December and taken into Harwich.

== 8 December ==
List of shipwrecks: 8 December 1837
Ship	State	Description
Hawk	United Kingdom	The ship struck the Corton Sand, in the North Sea off the coast of Suffolk and sank. Her crew were rescued.
Louisa	Denmark	The ship was driven ashore near Varbla, Russia. She was on a voyage from Riga, Russia to Copenhagen.
South Australian	United Kingdom	The ship was driven onto an inshore reef at Rosetta Harbour in Encounter Bay in South Australia by a south-easterly gale whilst at anchor. The vessel was completely wrecked and was partially salvaged during the following fortnight.
Tiger	United Kingdom	The ship was driven ashore at Point Aldersen, Massachusetts, United States. She was on a voyage from St. Ubes, Portugal to Miramichi, New Brunswick, British North America. Tiger was refloated on 10 December and was beached.

== 9 December ==
List of shipwrecks: 9 December 1837
Ship	State	Description
Anna Maria	Hamburg	The ship was wrecked on Scharhörn. She was on a voyage from Copenhagen to Altona.
Maria	Portugal	The schooner was driven ashore and wrecked on Ilhéu de Rosto de Cão, off São Miguel Island, Azores.
Pa Dalgada	Portugal	The schooner was driven ashore and wrecked on Ilhéu de Rosto de Cão.
Yvone	France	The ship capsized off Gibraltar. Her crew were rescued. She was on a voyage from Buccari, Kingdom of Croatia-Slavonia to Bordeaux, Gironde.

== 10 December ==
List of shipwrecks: 10 December 1837
Ship	State	Description
Britannia	United Kingdom	The ship departed from Savanilla, near Puerto Colombia, for Liverpool, Lancashire. No further trace, presumed foundered with the loss of all hands.
Irene	United Kingdom	The ship capsized off Gibraltar. Her crew were rescued.
Selina	United Kingdom	The ship was wrecked at Porto, Portugal. She was on a voyage from Newfoundland to Porto.
Sir William Cumming	United Kingdom	The ship was holed by her anchor and sank at Lossiemouth, Lothian.

== 11 December ==
List of shipwrecks: 11 December 1837
Ship	State	Description
Hope	United Kingdom	The brig ran aground and was severely damaged at King's Lynn, Norfolk. She was on a voyage from Stockton-on-Tees, County Durham to King's Lynn.
Ringdove	United Kingdom	The ship capsized in the River Tyne. She was later refloated.

== 12 December ==
List of shipwrecks: 12 December 1837
Ship	State	Description
George Lockwood	United Kingdom	The ship struck rocks off the Isles of Scilly. She was consequently beached at Penzance, Cornwall. She was on a voyage from Quebec City Lower Canada, British North America to London. George Lockwood was refloated on 23 December and taken into Penzance.
Johanna	(Russian Empire) Grand Duchy of Finland	The ship lost her rudder off Dunkirk, Nord, France and was abandoned by her crew. She was on a voyage from Oulu to London, United Kingdom. Johanna was driven ashore and damaged at Ostend, West Flanders, Belgium on 14 December. She was later refloated and taken into Ostend.

== 13 December ==
List of shipwrecks: 13 December 1837
Ship	State	Description
Albion	United Kingdom	The ship ran aground on the North Gar and was damaged. She was taken into Stockton-on-Tees, County Durham for repairs.

== 14 December ==
List of shipwrecks: 14 December 1837
Ship	State	Description
Betsey	United Kingdom	The ship was driven onto the Whitburn Steals and severely damaged. She was on a voyage from London to South Shields, County Durham. Betsey was refloated the next day and taken into South Shields.
Catherine	United Kingdom	The ship sprang a leak and was beached at Cork. She was on a voyage from Cardiff, Glamorgan to Limerick.
Maria Eliza	United Kingdom	The ship was driven ashore at Cork. She was later refloated.
Mary	United Kingdom	The ship was wrecked on the Globe Rock, off Girvan, Ayrshire. She was on a voyage from Glasson Dock, Lancashire to Ayr.
Mary and Bell	United Kingdom	The ship was driven ashore at Dundalk, County Louth.
Pandora	United Kingdom	The ship was driven ashore at Westport, County Mayo.
Mary and Betty	United Kingdom	The ship was driven ashore and severely damaged at Whitehaven, Cumberland.
St. Johnston	United Kingdom	The steamship struck a rock off Warkworth, Northumberland. She capsized and sank. Her crew were rescued.

== 15 December ==
List of shipwrecks: 15 December 1837
Ship	State	Description
Catharine	United Kingdom	The ship sprang a leak and was beached at Cork. She was on a voyage from Cardiff, Glamorgan to Limerick.
Venus	United Kingdom	The ship was wrecked on the Hoxley Rocks. Her crew were rescued. She was on a voyage from South Shields, County Durham to Dundee, Forfarshire.

== 16 December ==
List of shipwrecks: 16 December 1837
Ship	State	Description
Cervantes	United Kingdom	The ship was wrecked on Anegada a Fuera. She was on a voyage from Liverpool, Lancashire to Veracruz, Mexico.
Happy Return	(United Kingdom of Great Britain and Ireland) Guernsey	The ship departed from Guernsey for São Miguel Island, Azores. No further trace, presumed foundered with the loss of all hands.
Monarch	United Kingdom	The paddle steamer ran aground near "Ost". She was on a voyage from Hull, Yorkshire to Hamburg.
Thomas and Mary	United Kingdom	The ship struck the Haisborough Sands, in the North Sea off the coast of Norfolk and sank. Her crew were rescued. She was on a voyage from Newport, Monmouthshire to Newcastle upon Tyne, Northumberland.

== 17 December ==
List of shipwrecks: 17 December 1837
Ship	State	Description
Bride of Abydos	United Kingdom	The schooner was driven ashore and wrecked at Aveiro, Portugal. Her crew were rescued. She was on a voyage from London to Ancona, Papal States.
Fennegina	Netherlands	The ship was wrecked on the Oosterbank, in the North Sea. She was on a voyage from Cardiff, Glamorgan, United Kingdom to Rotterdam, South Holland.
Venus	United Kingdom	The ship was wrecked at the mouth of the River Tay with the loss of all ten crew.

== 18 December ==
List of shipwrecks: 18 December 1837
Ship	State	Description
Exchange	(United Kingdom of Great Britain and Ireland) Jersey	The brig was driven into London Bridge at Southwark, Surrey and was severely damaged.
Gambia	United Kingdom	The ship was wrecked at Beaver Harbour, New Brunswick, British North America. She was on a voyage from Jamaica to Saint John, New Brunswick.
Indus	United Kingdom	The ship was driven ashore at Cape Hatteras, North Carolina, United States. She was on a voyage from Jamaica to Norfolk, Virginia, United States.

== 19 December ==
List of shipwrecks: 19 December 1837
Ship	State	Description
Caroline	United Kingdom	The ship was wrecked on Paroquet Island, New Brunswick, British North America.
Chance	United Kingdom	The ship ran aground off "Hornbeck". She was on a voyage from Saint Petersburg, Russia to Stettin. Chance was consequently condemned.
Edward	United Kingdom	The ship was driven ashore near Ballymacan, County Tyrone. Her crew were rescued. She was on a voyage from Cork to Waterford.
Good Agreement	United Kingdom	The brig was driven ashore and wrecked near Hartlepool, County Durham with the loss of two of her crew.
Harmonie	France	The ship struck the pier at Bremen and was severely damaged. She was on a voyage from Bordeaux, Gironde to Bremen.
Queen	(United Kingdom of Great Britain and Ireland) Jersey	The ship foundered off Corcubión, Spain.

== 20 December ==
List of shipwrecks: 20 December 1837
Ship	State	Description
Betsey	United Kingdom	The ship was driven ashore at Warkworth, Northumberland.
Diligence	United Kingdom	The schooner ran aground on the Lynch Sandbank, in the Bristol Channel off the coast of Glamorgan. Her crew were rescued. She was on a voyage from Hayle, Cornwall to Swansea, Glamorgan. Diligence was refloated on 23 December.
Hope	United Kingdom	The brig was driven ashore at South Foreland, Kent. She was on a voyage from Portsmouth, Hampshire to Sunderland, County Durham. Hope was later refloated and take into Ramsgate, Kent.
James Turean	United Kingdom	The ship was driven ashore at Liverpool, Lancashire. She was on a voyage from Calcutta, India to Liverpool.
James Watt	United Kingdom	The paddle steamer ran aground in the Elbe at Altona. She was on a voyage from Hamburg to Leith, Lothian.
Palmyra	United Kingdom	The ship was driven ashore near Liverpool. She was on a voyage from Liverpool to Demerara. Palmyra was refloated on 22 December and taken into Liverpool.
Rebecca	United Kingdom	The ship was driven ashore and wrecked at Newbiggin-by-the-Sea, Northumberland. Her crew were rescued. She was on a voyage from London to Sunderland.
Schah	(United Kingdom of Great Britain and Ireland) New South Wales	The schooner was wrecked 2 nautical miles (3.7 km) east of Ram Head with the loss of ten of the 23 people on board. She was on a voyage from Hobart, Van Diemen's Land to a port in New South Wales.
Townsend	United Kingdom	The brig was driven ashore at Aberavon, Glamorgan. Her crew were rescued. She was on a voyage from Limerick to Kilrush, County Clare.
William and Ann	United Kingdom	The ship was driven ashore and wrecked at Winterton-on-Sea, Norfolk. She was on a voyage from Great Yarmouth, Norfolk to Leeds, Yorkshire.

== 21 December ==
List of shipwrecks: 21 December 1837
Ship	State	Description
Amelia	United Kingdom	The ship was wrecked on the Hook Sand, in the Bristol Channel with the loss of all hands. She was on a voyage from Cardiff, Glamorgan to Bristol, Gloucestershire.
Amiable Lucette	France	The ship foundered in the English Channel off the Pierres de Lecq, Jersey, Channel Islands. The body of one of her eleven crew was found. She was on a voyage from Buenos Aires, Argentina to Rotterdam, South Holland, Netherlands.
Dove	United Kingdom	The brig was driven ashore and wrecked at Flamborough Head, Yorkshire with the loss of all hands. She was on a voyage from London to Scarborough, Yorkshire.
Ellen and Sarah	United Kingdom	The sloop was driven ashore in a capsized state at Hayburn Wyke, Yorkshire with the loss of all hands.
Faithful	United Kingdom	The brig was driven ashore at Flamborough Head, Yorkshire with the loss of her captain. Twelve crew were rescued. She was on a voyage from London to Newcastle upon Tyne, Northumberland.
Fame	United Kingdom	The ship was driven ashore and wrecked at Staintondale, Yorkshire with the loss of all but two of her crew. She was on a voyage from Middlesbrough, Yorkshire to London.
Friendship	United Kingdom	The ship was driven ashore near Whitby, Yorkshire. Her crew were rescued. She was on a voyage from London to Hartlepool, County Durham. Friendship was refloated on 1 January 1838 and towed into South Shields, County Durham.
Hebe	United Kingdom	The ship was driven ashore near Cleethorpes, Lincolnshire. She was later refloated and put into Grimsby, Lincolnshire.
John Botcherby	United Kingdom	The ship was driven ashore near Whitby. Her crew were rescued. She was on a voyage from London to Middlesbrough. John Botcherby was refloated on 1 January 1838 and taken into Whitby.
Laura	Sweden	The brig was driven ashore north of Flamborough Head with the loss of three of her crew. She was on a voyage from Gävle to Kingston upon Hull, Yorkshire.
Matilda	United Kingdom	The ship was abandoned in the North Sea. Her crew were rescued by the Whitby Lifeboat. She was on a voyage from Newcastle upon Tyne, Northumberland to Rochester, Kent. Matilda was taken into Whitby, Yorkshire on 24 December.
Middlesbrough	United Kingdom	The ship was driven ashore and wrecked near Whitby with the loss of two of her crew. She was on a voyage from Middlesbrough to London. Peace was later refloated and taken into Bridlington.
Peace	United Kingdom	The ship was driven ashore and wrecked south of Scarborough, Yorkshire. Her crew were rescued.
Peak	United Kingdom	The ship was driven ashore at Staithes, Yorkshire. Her crew were rescued. Peak was refloated on 1 January 1838 and taken into Whitby.
Providence	United Kingdom	The ship ran aground on the Mouse Sand, in the North Sea off the coast of Essex. She was on a voyage from London to Stockton-on-Tees, County Durham. Providence was refloated and taken into Sheerness, Kent.
Skylark	United Kingdom	The ship was driven ashore near Cleethorpes. She was on a voyage from Rochester to Sunderland, County Durham. Skylark was refloated and taken into Grimsby.
Thistle	(United Kingdom of Great Britain and Ireland) Van Diemen's Land	The ship was driven ashore at Port Fairy, New South Wales.
United States	United States	The ship was driven ashore and severely damaged in Bootle Bay. She was on a voyage from Charleston, South Carolina to Liverpool, Lancashire, United Kingdom. She was refloated on 28 December and taken into Liverpool.
William and Ann	United Kingdom	The sloop was driven ashore and wrecked at Winterton-on-Sea, Norfolk. Her crew were rescued. She was on a voyage from Great Yarmouth, Norfolk to Leeds, Yorkshire.
Williams	United Kingdom	The ship was driven ashore and wrecked near Hartlepool. Williams was refloated on 5 January 1838 and taken into Sunderland.

== 22 December ==
List of shipwrecks: 22 December 1837
Ship	State	Description
Baltic	United Kingdom	The ship was driven ashore at Mundesley, Norfolk. Her crew were rescued.
Britannia	United Kingdom	The ship was driven ashore at the mouth of the River Dee. She was on a voyage from Lisbon, Portugal to Liverpool, Lancashire. Britannia was refloated on 25 December and taken into Liverpool.
Preston	United Kingdom	The ship was driven ashore near Mundesley. Her crew were rescued. She was on a voyage from Sunderland, County Durham to London.
Schah	(United Kingdom of Great Britain and Ireland) New South Wales	The ship was wrecked in Twofold Bay with the loss of ten of the 24 people on board. She was on a voyage from Hobart, Van Diemen's Land to Sydney.
Shaw	United Kingdom	The ship was driven ashore at Pile Foundry, Cumberland. She was refloated on 2 January 1838 and taken into Whitehaven, Cumberland.
Socrates	Greece	The ship ran aground off Grado, Kingdom of Lombardy–Venetia and sank. She was on a voyage from Salonica to Trieste.
Uncertain	United Kingdom	The ship was driven ashore near Mundesley. Her crew were rescued by the Mundesley Lifeboat. She was on a voyage from Sunderland to London.

== 23 December ==
List of shipwrecks: 23 December 1837
Ship	State	Description
Ariel	United States	The schooner was driven ashore and wrecked at Veracruz, Mexico.
Bearnais	France	The full-rigged ship was driven ashore and wrecked at Veracruz.
Brothers	(United Kingdom of Great Britain and Ireland) New South Wales	The cutter was wrecked off Nobbys Island. Her eight crew were rescued by Tamar ( (United Kingdom of Great Britain and Ireland) New South Wales).
Emelie	Kingdom of Sardinia	The brig was destroyed by fire at Trieste.
Enigheden	Hamburg	The ship ran aground at Glückstadt, Duchy of Holstein. She was on a voyage from New Bedford, Massachusetts, United States to Hamburg.
France	United Kingdom	The full-rigged ship was driven ashore and wrecked at Veracruz.
Isabella	United Kingdom	The ship was driven ashore near "Fauleigh". She was on a voyage from London to Hobart, Van Diemens Land. Isabella was refloated on 6 January and taken into Portsmouth, Hampshire.
Lord Stewart	United Kingdom	The ship struck a rock and was beached near Sunderland, County Durham.
Melanchto	United Kingdom	The ship was driven ashore and wrecked at Veracruz.

== 24 December ==
List of shipwrecks: 24 December 1837
Ship	State	Description
Enegheden	Norway	The ship was wrecked on the Atherfield Ledge. Her crew were rescued. She was on a voyage from St. Ubes, Portugal to Christiansand.
Janet	United Kingdom	The ship departed from Newcastle upon Tyne, Northumberland for Alexandria, Egypt. No further trace, presumed foundered with the loss of all hands.
Latona	United Kingdom	The ship was beached on Flores Island, Azores.

== 25 December ==
List of shipwrecks: 25 December 1837
Ship	State	Description
Cyrus	United Kingdom	The ship was driven ashore at Sandgate, Kent. She was on a voyage from Sunderland, County Durham to Bordeaux, Gironde, France. Cyrus was refloated and taken into Dover, Kent.
Friendship	United Kingdom	The ship sank at Ramsgate, Kent, having previously been ashore near Dover, Kent. She was on a voyage from Sligo to London.
Good Luck	United Kingdom	The ship was driven ashore near Marsala, Kingdom of the Two Sicilies. She was on a voyage from Kerch, Russia to London.
Itherfanster	Norway	The ship was driven ashore at Ambleteuse. She was on a voyage from Cette, Hérault, France to Stavanger.
Lord Wellington	United Kingdom	The schooner was driven ashore and wrecked at Ambleteuse, Pas-de-Calais, France. She was on a voyage from Portsmouth, Hampshire to Sunderland, County Durham.
Storfursten	Sweden	The ship was driven ashore and wrecked at Ambleteuse.
Vera Cruzano	Mexico	The ship was wrecked on the Anegadadue.

== 26 December ==
List of shipwrecks: 26 December 1837
Ship	State	Description
Euphemia	United Kingdom	The ship was wrecked on the coast of Campeche, Mexico. Her crew were rescued.

== 27 December ==
List of shipwrecks: 27 December 1837
Ship	State	Description
Ellen and Sarah	United Kingdom	The ship foundered in the North Sea off Scarborough, Yorkshire with the loss of all hands. She was on a voyage from Spalding, Lincolnshire to Newcastle upon Tyne, Northumberland.

== 28 December ==
List of shipwrecks: 28 December 1837
Ship	State	Description
Dream	United Kingdom	The ship was destroyed by fire at Southwark, Surrey.
Victoria	United Kingdom	The Yorkshire Billyboy was destroyed by fire at Southwark.
Water Witch	United Kingdom	The ship struck the Blackwater Bank, in the Irish Sea and sank. Her crew were rescued. She was on a voyage from Liverpool, Lancashire to Barbados.

== 29 December ==
List of shipwrecks: 29 December 1837
Ship	State	Description
Campbell	United Kingdom	The ship ran aground at Liverpool, Lancashire. She was on a voyage from Paraíba, Brazil to Liverpool.
Caroline	United States	Caroline. Caroline affair: The paddle steamer was set afire, set adrift, and carried over Niagara Falls with the loss of one life.
Hebe	United Kingdom	The sloop was driven ashore on the Abertay Sands. She was on a voyage from Hartlepool, County Durham to Dundee, Forfarshire. Hebe was refloated but consequently beached on the Buddon Sands. She was then taken into Dundee.
Helena	France	The ship was driven ashore south of Helsingør, Denmark. She was on a voyage from Stettin to Bordeaux, Gironde.
John Pirie	(United Kingdom of Great Britain and Ireland) South Australia	The ship was driven ashore at Rosetta Harbour, Encounter Bay, South Australia. She was refloated and continued her journey, arrived Hobart on 16 January 1838.
Solway	(United Kingdom of Great Britain and Ireland) South Australia	The barque was driven ashore at Rosetta Harbour in Encounter Bay. Her crew were rescued. The anchor was recovered in the 1960s and is on display outdoors, with a plaque, at Victor Harbor. It is reported to have been a 337-ton, 3-masted wooden ship that had transported 57 German immigrants, along with sheep and cargo, to the fledgling colony of South Australia.

== 30 December ==
List of shipwrecks: 30 December 1837
Ship	State	Description
Commerce	United Kingdom	The ship was driven ashore and wrecked near Youghal, County Cork. Her crew were rescued. She was on a voyage from Swansea, Glamorgan to Youghal.
Huzza	Hamburg	The ship was abandoned in the Atlantic Ocean. Her crew were rescued by Douglastown (United Kingdom). Huzza was on a voyage from Hamburg to Saint John, New Brunswick, British North America.
New London	United States	The ship foundered in the Atlantic Ocean. She was on a voyage from New York to New Orleans, Louisiana.
Tanna Sautjer	Bremen	The ship was driven ashore south of Helsingør, Denmark. She was on a voyage from Rotterdam, South Holland, Netherlands to Bremen.

== 31 December ==
List of shipwrecks: 31 December 1837
Ship	State	Description
Mary	United Kingdom	The ship departed from Helsingør, Denmark for Aberdeen. Presumed to have subsequently foundered off Christiania, Norway.
Mercury	United Kingdom	The ship departed from Helsingør for Aberdeen. Presumed to has subsequently foundered off Christiania.
Thistle	United Kingdom	The ship was wrecked in the River Tay with the loss of her captain. The remaining four crew were rescued.

== Unknown date ==
List of shipwrecks: Unknown date in December 1837
Ship	State	Description
Aisthorp	United Kingdom	The ship was driven ashore and wrecked near Dundalk, County Louth.
Amaranth	United Kingdom	The ship was wrecked on Mud Island. She was on a voyage from Shelburne, Nova Scotia, British North America to New York City, United States.
Amelia	United Kingdom	The ship was driven ashore at Pensacola, Florida, United States. She was on a voyage from Natchez to Liverpool, Lancashire.
Bienfaisance	France	The ship was abandoned in the North Sea 20 leagues (60 nautical miles (110 km)) off Terschelling, Friesland, Netherlands on or before 7 December.
Bolivar	United Kingdom	The ship was driven ashore near "Dunnose". She was on a voyage from London to Berbice, British Honduras. Bolivar was later refloated and taken into Portsmouth, Hampshire.
Charlotta Wilhelmina	Hamburg	The ship was driven ashore and severely damaged on the coast of Norway. She was on a voyage from Hammerfest, Norway to Hamburg. Charlotta Wilhelmina was later refloated and taken into "Hennoe".
Elizabeth	United Kingdom	The sloop was driven ashore and severely damaged at St. Andrews, Fifein late December. She was refloated on 31 December and taken into St. Andrews.
Express	United Kingdom	The ship was driven ashore at Saltfleet, Lincolnshire. She was refloated on 4 January 1838 and taken into Grimsby, Lincolnshire.
George	United Kingdom	The ship foundered with the loss of all hands. She was on a voyage from Saint Petersburg, Russia to North Shields, County Durham.
George	United Kingdom	The ship was driven ashore at Penzance, Cornwall. She was on a voyage from Quebec City, Lower Canada, British North America to London. George was refloated on 22 December and taken into Penzance.
Hope	United Kingdom	The ship was wrecked at Ventava, Courland Governorate before 3 December. Her crew were rescued.
Jane	United Kingdom	The ship was driven ashore on Fish Island, New Brunswick, British North America. She was on a voyage from Miramichi, New Brunswick to Cardiff, Glamorgan. Jane was consequently condemned.
John Dougan	United Kingdom	The ship departed from South Shields, County Durham for Gibraltar in mid-December. No further trace, presumed foundered with the loss of all hands.
Miranda	United Kingdom	The ship was lost off the coast of County Donegal on or before 5 December.
Orelia	United Kingdom	The ship was driven ashore at Bearhaven, County Cork before 10 December. She was on a voyage from Quebec City, Lower Canada, British North America to Cork. Orelia was refloated on 10 December.
Pauline	United Kingdom	The ship departed from Sydney, Nova Scotia, British North America for New York, United States. No further trace, presumed foundered with the loss of all hands.
Pepito	Spain	The ship departed from Vigo for Seville in mid-December. No further trace, presumed foundered with the loss of all hands.
Robert	United Kingdom	The ship was driven ashore whilst on a voyage from Havre de Grâce, Seine-Inférieure, France to Newcastle upon Tyne, Northumberland. Robert was refloated and put into Ramsgate, Kent in a sinking condition on 26 December.
Rover	United States	The whaler was lost at Monterey, California.
