= Pirih =

Pirih is a Slovenian surname. Notable people with the surname include:

- Metod Pirih (1936–2021), Slovenian Roman Catholic prelate
- Miha Pirih (born 1978), Slovenian rower
- Tomaž Pirih (born 1981), Slovenian rower, brother of Miha

== See also ==
- Pirie
