= South Australian (1836) =

Barque shipwreck in South Australia

History

United Kingdom
- Name: Marquess of Salisbury (1819–1824)
- Owner: Captain Sutton (1819–1824)
- Builder: Richard Symons, Little Falmouth
- Laid down: 1817
- Launched: 1819
- Fate: Sold in 1824

United Kingdom
- Name: HMP Swallow
- Acquired: July 1824
- Fate: Sold in 1836.

United Kingdom
- Name: South Australian (1836–1837)
- Owner: South Australian Company (1836–1837)
- Fate: Wrecked in Rosetta Harbour, Encounter Bay, South Australia, on 8 December 1837
- Notes: Protected shipwreck site

General characteristics
- Type: barque
- Tons burthen: 236 (bm)
- Length: 87 ft
- Beam: 25 ft
- Draught: 6 ft

HMP Swallow (also incorrectly referred to as HMS Swallow), was a barque launched as the packet ship Marquess of Salisbury (sometimes incorrectly cited as Marquis of Salisbury (Note: The ship was officially named Marquess of Salisbury, but is listed in Lloyd's Register of Shipping and some other sources as Marquis of Salisbury.)) in 1819. She was acquired by the Royal Navy in July 1824 and renamed Swallow, and sold in 1836 to the South Australian Company, which renamed her South Australian. After being used as one of the colony of South Australia's first immigrant ships, she was wrecked off the south coast of South Australia on 8 December 1837, becoming South Australia's oldest known shipwreck. The ship was also significant for having transported the first Aboriginal man accused of murdering a European, Reppindjeri. The wreck site was discovered in 2018, and is protected under national shipwreck legislation.

== History ==
Marquess of Salisbury, a barque to be used as a packet ship, was built in Little Falmouth, Cornwall. Launched in 1819, Howat (1984) reports that she was built by Richard Symons for Captain Sutton, but an article published in 2026 by the Australian National Maritime Museum says that the "builder, owner, and master" was former Royal Navy officer Thomas Baldock, who had served in North America during the War of 1812 before being invalided out in 1816. The ship was registered at Falmouth on 13 November 1820. Its length was 87 ft (26.6 m) and it had a breadth of 25 ft (7.7 m). Its first entry in Lloyd's Register recorded that its hull had copper sheathing. It was outfitted with two decks, and the height between them was 6 ft. There was a space of 1.8 m (5 ft 11 in) between its two decks.

Marquess of Salisbury undertook the Atlantic crossing three times, its first departure from Falmouth being on 20 April 1821, bound for Halifax, Nova Scotia. After stops in New York and Bermuda, she arrived back in Falmouth four months later. In 1822 and 1823 she operated as a civilian packet between the same ports, her final run in this role beginning in November 1823 under acting command of Lt. Robert Bradley Roe, returning on 12 March 1824. From 24 October 1821 Baldock was her master.

After being acquired by the Royal Navy in July 1824, the ship was renamed HMP (Her Majesty's Packet) Swallow, (Note: Howat says HMS Swallow.) and commissioned in the Admiralty Packet Service, as the Admiralty took over the Post Office service after the Napoleonic wars. The ship was sometimes described as a brig (or "packet brig") while used by the Navy, despite retaining the three masts that classed it as a barque, and was equipped with six guns. and delivered mail around the British Empire as a naval packet.

Baldock was reappointed as Lieutenant in the Navy in September 1824, and again commanded his former ship. After some refitting, including new copper sheathing, Swallow began service as a naval packet across the Atlantic a year later, travelling between Falmouth, North and Central America, and the Caribbean. The vessel was under the command of Baldock for four voyages, before Lieutenant Smyth Griffith assumed command on 25 November 1831. The first crossing under his command was to South America in late 1832. The vessel was then repaired and refitted at Devonport, Plymouth before returning to service in Falmouth by the end of April 1833. She was assigned to the North America and West Indies Station in 1834 and also sailed to Halifax that year.

On 16 October 1834, HMP Swallow capsized in the Gulf of Mexico during a strong gale or hurricane. Her masts were cut off and her guns were thrown overboard before she was righted. One seaman died. She put into Havana, Cuba for repairs. She returned to Falmouth on 15 January 1835. After a trip to the Caribbean, the vessel voyaged to Brazil in July of that year. In Rio de Janeiro, Swallow picked up one passenger, four prisoners, and a consignment of "treasure" (valued at £8,756), returning to Falmouth late in 1835 on its last trip as a packet. She was placed in ordinary (out of service) at Plymouth and was paid off on 14 January 1836.

On 8 September 1836, Edmund John Wheeler, manager of the to the South Australian Company, paid £1,000 to purchase the ship, and ownership was officially transferred on 20 October 1836. After refitting and recladding the hull with copper, the vessel was renamed South Australian. Chartered to carry free colonists and cargo to the colony of South Australia, she sailed from Portsmouth on 22 December 1836 under the command of Captain Alexander Allen, arriving at Nepean Bay on Kangaroo Island on 23 April 1837. On board were 70 British and German emigrants, including company commercial manager David McLaren and Henry Richard Mildred, superintendent of the first shipyard. At least three of the crew were listed as "harpooners", who would stay on South Australian after the passengers had disembarked, as it was intended that South Australian sail on to the British Southern Whale Fishery in the South Pacific Ocean.

After the cargo was unloaded and passengers disembarked, South Australian was prepared for whaling. She left Kangaroo Island for Rosetta Harbour in Encounter Bay on the morning of 23 May, arriving there 12 hours later. Most of the crew, as well as several passengers, stayed on to work at the whaling station. Captain Allen died four months later, and John Boyd Thorburn MacFarlane, a headsman at the company fishery, assumed command. The ship was fitted out to be used for "cutting-in" (removing blubber from whales, also known as flensing), and was thereafter stationed for four months at Encounter Bay.

In early November 1837, the ship was used to transport Reppindjeri, (Note: Also spelt Reppeenyere, and also known as Elick, Alick and Ronculla.) who had allegedly murdered European whaler John Driscoll, and was the first Aboriginal person recorded as killing a European in the colony of South Australia, to Kangaroo Island. Driscoll "was reportedly living with one of Reppindjeri's wives, Popalbe, in an arrangement to which the Aboriginal man consented"; however, "Driscoll had apparently molested [Popalbe]". Governor Hindmarsh, who heard the case, concluded that the killing was not murder, but justifiable homicide. Reppindjeri was chained up before being put on board. It is thought that he probably escaped from custody on Kangaroo Island. The case is significant because "there were no mechanisms in colonial law for prosecuting Reppindjeri". (Note: "The immediate difficulty was occasioned by the fact that the only witnesses to the slaying were Reppindjeri's wives, but under British law, their evidence was not valid since, being 'heathens', they could not take the oath…") William Wyatt, Protector of Aborigines in SA, advocated for Reppindjeri, and condemned the practices of the whalers, who mistreated Aboriginal women. In March 2006, a musical based on the story of Reppindjeri was presented by the Blackwood Reconciliation Group at Scotch College.

On 23 November 1837, South Australian left Kingscote on Kangaroo island for its last journey, under Captain MacFarlane.

== Fate ==
After arriving at Rosetta Harbour, the crew of South Australian began preparing the 200 barrels of whale oil and 10 tons of whalebone produced by the whaling station to load it aboard another South Australian Company vessel, the Solway. South Australian was wrecked during a storm while at anchor in Rosetta Harbour on 8 December 1837. There were also some passengers aboard, who were some of the earliest immigrants to the colony. Despite various measures taken by the seamen, at 5:30 pm, the vessel hit Black Reef, which crosses Encounter Bay, causing first one hawser, and then the port anchor cable, to break, and South Australian drifted shorewards, becoming grounded in front of the Fountain Inn on the shoreline. The passengers included David McLaren; the son of Governor Hindmarsh, also named John Hindmarsh; and Sir John Jeffcott, the first judge in the South Australian Supreme Court. The passengers and luggage were taken safely to shore, and no loss of life was recorded. Extensive salvaging of the ship was undertaken under the lead of Captain MacFarlane, but flooding of the lower hold prevented the crew from retrieving many of the provisions and other articles stored there.

South Australian thus became the oldest known shipwreck in South Australia. Later in December, two ships ran into trouble at the same site soon afterwards: Solway was wrecked (all crew saved), and John Pirie was blown ashore in a storm in December 1837 while anchored, but was able to be refloated.

== Wreck site ==
For several years, the masts were visible, and in the 1930s, wreckage was visible on the sea floor. In the 1990s, the Department of Environment and Heritage) made two attempts to rediscover the wreck, but its location was not found then.

The wreck site was located in April 2018 by a team including personnel from the following organisations: the Department for Environment and Water, the Silentworld Foundation, the South Australian Maritime Museum, the Australian National Maritime Museum (ANMM), Flinders University Maritime Archaeology Program, and the MaP Fund. It is one of several shipwrecks in Victor Harbor, and lies directly in front of the heritage-listed "Yelki by the Sea" (formerly Fountain Inn at Yilki), approximately 300–400 m (980–1,310 ft) offshore and at a depth of 2–3 m (6 ft 7 in – 9 ft 10 in).

On 5 July 2018, a protected zone was declared under the state's Historic Shipwrecks Act 1981 over the wreck site at 35°34.641′S 138°36.213′E. This prohibits all vessels and people from entering a 30-metre (98 ft) zone around the wreck without a permit.

The wreck includes some of the wood framing and hull, copper bolts on the keel, along with pieces of glass and pottery. The site was not able to be fully explored until after the 2020–2021 COVID-19 pandemic, when ANMM maritime archaeologists, an archaeological conservator from the Silentworld Foundation, along with a number of volunteers, travelled to the site to continue work there, which included photogrammetric 3D recording and mapping of the wreck site. Some items were recovered from the wreck, including: a gun flint, decorated ceramic pieces, various fasteners, glass bottles, and a whetstone. Researchers from the Department for Environment and Water and its partners continued to visit the site, to monitor sediment levels and to record newly-exposed parts of the wreck.

In 2024 to late 2025, an exhibition titled A Graphic Tale of Shipwreck – Rediscovering South Australian was held at the ANMM. After its closure, the wreck artefacts were transferred to the National Trust Museum in Victor Harbor, where they are on permanent display as of 2026.

During 2026, the site is being buried in 2026 using geotextile, sandbags, and marine sediment in order to protect and preserve the wreck.

== Significance and impact ==
James Hunter, curator of naval heritage and archaeology at ANMM, notes that the wreck's historical significance "cannot be overstated" for its potential to expand the current understanding of the colonisation of South Australia and subsequent occupation, in particular including the trade based on whaling, and the interactions between the new settlers and Aboriginal peoples. South Australian is one of only two wrecks of 19th-century British sailing packet ships to have been examined by archaeologists, and recent changes to the seabed in the area are in danger of uncovering the site, so there is some urgency attached to stabilising the wreck.

The digital 3D model of the site has formed the basis of a virtual reality experience developed by the University of Applied Sciences, Kaiserslautern, Germany. There was also a graphic novel based on the history of the ship, including its original logbook, being developed in 2023.

== See also ==
- List of shipwrecks of Australia

== Citations ==
=== Sources ===
- Howat, J.N.T. (1984). South American packets : the British packet service to Brazil, the River Plate, the West Coast (via the Straits of Magellan), and the Falkland Islands, 1808-80. York, England: Postal History Society in Association with William Sessions. ISBN 0900657952.
