= South Australian (disambiguation) =

(A) South Australian is a person or thing from the state of South Australia in Australia (adjective or noun).

South Australian may also refer to:

- The South Australian, a newspaper published in Adelaide from 1838 to 1851
- South Australian (1836), a barque wrecked in Encounter Bay, South Australia, in December 1837
- South Australian (clipper ship), a ship built in 1868, sunk in the Bristol Channel in 1889
