= George Pirie (publisher) =

Canadian newspaper publisher (1799–1870)

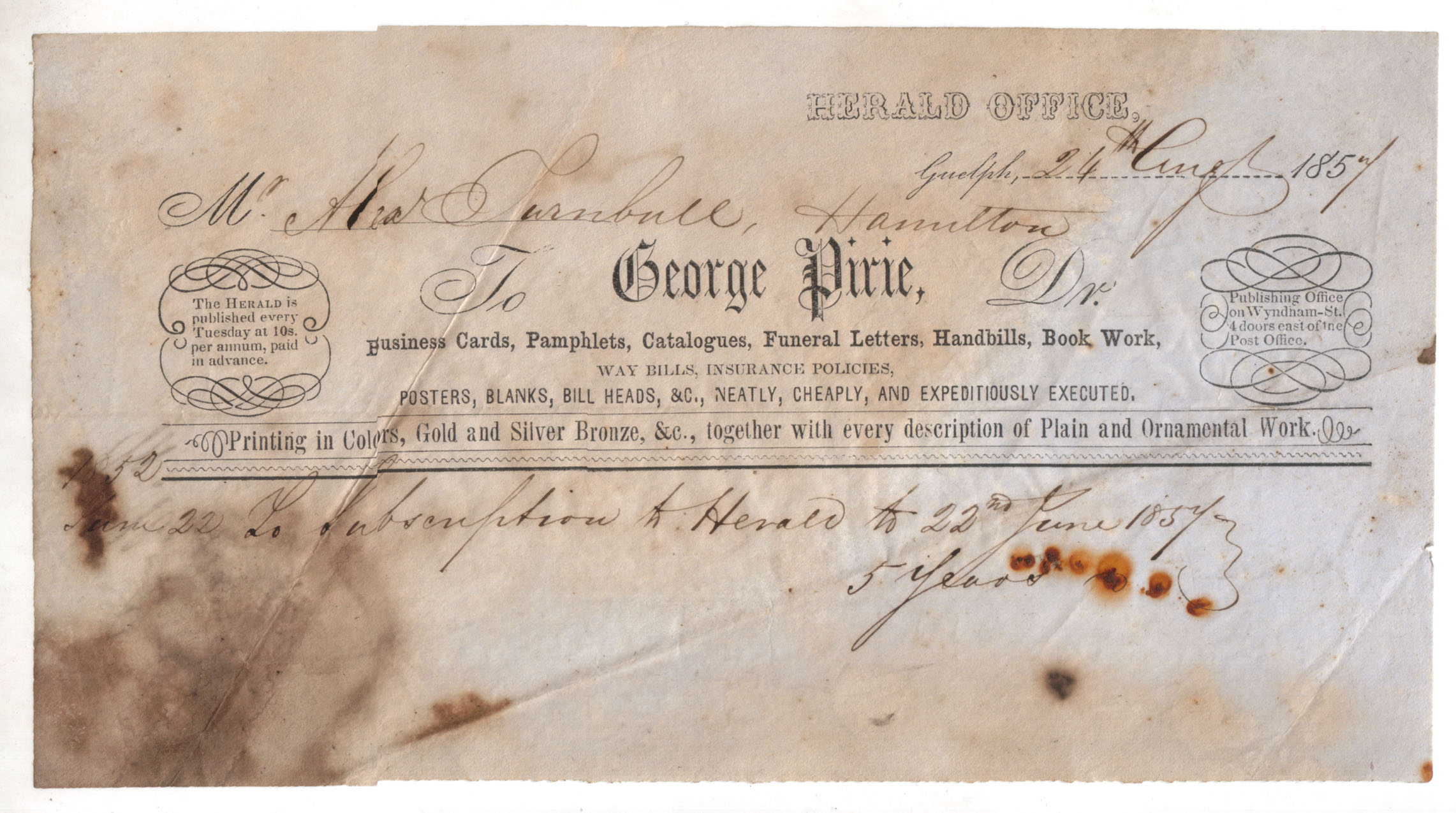
Guelph Herald Invoice 1857

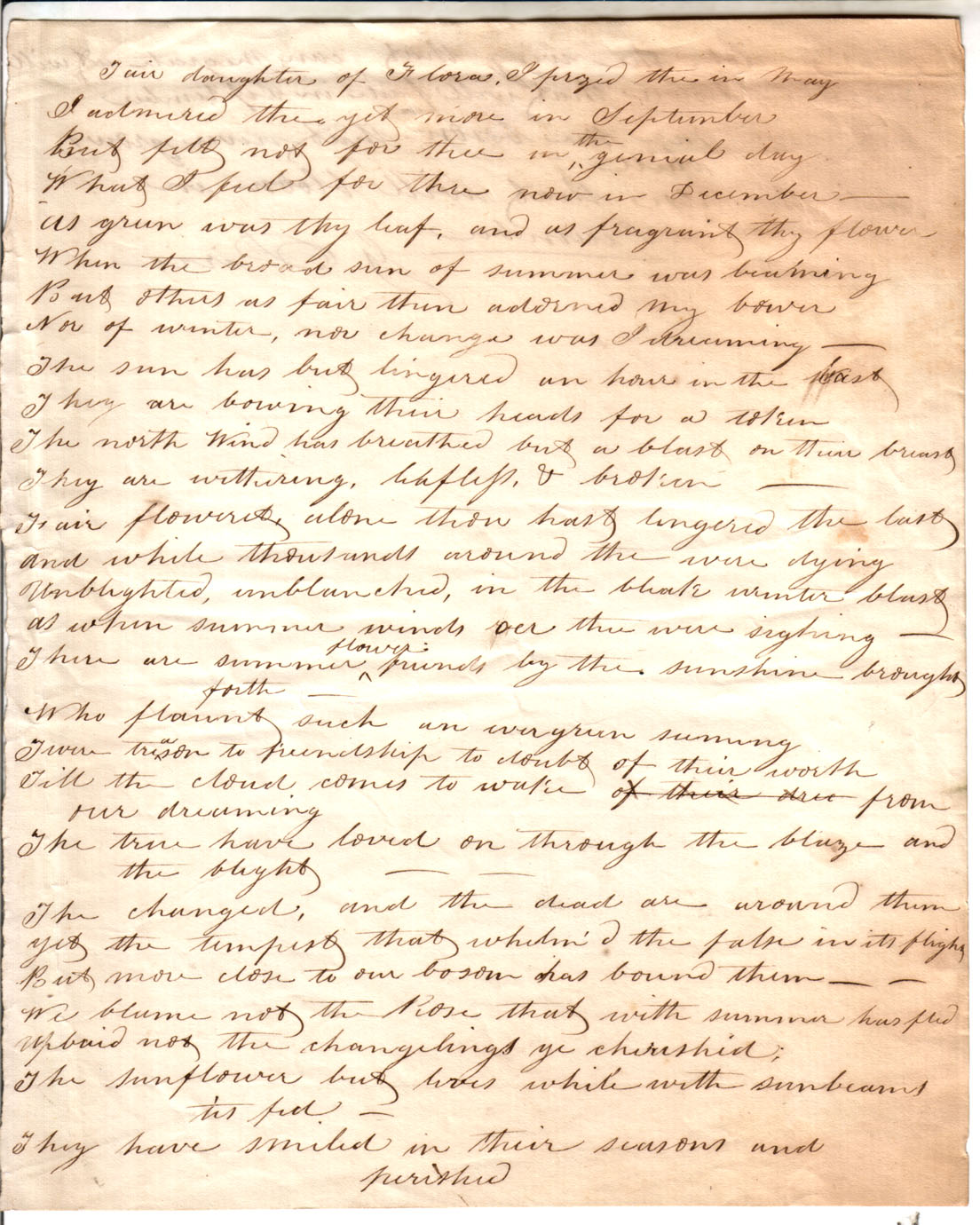
Fair Daughter of Flora by George Pirie. Original draft circa 1850s.

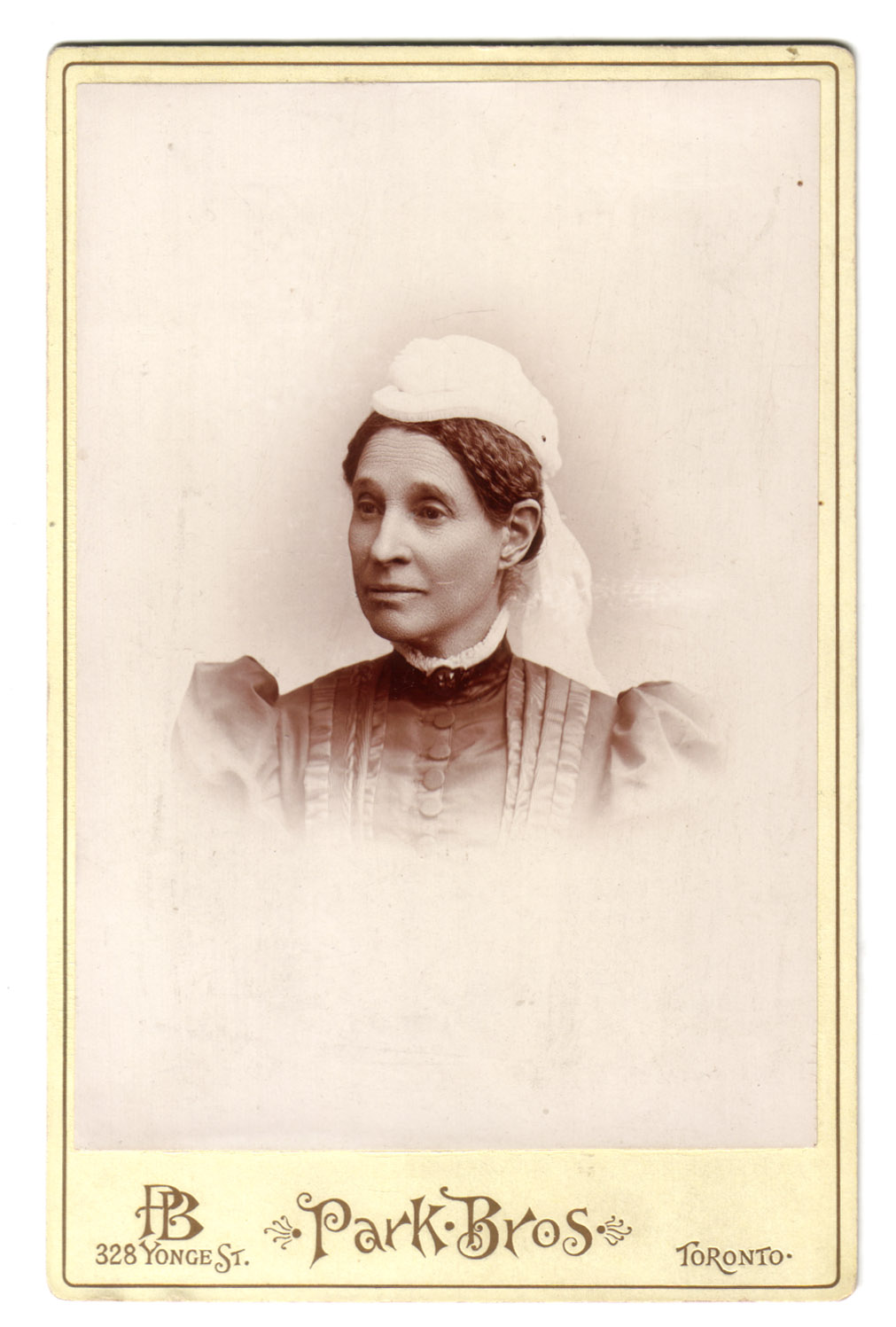
Jane Booth, 1825–1895

George Pirie (1799–1870) was a Canadian newspaper publisher.

He emigrated to Canada from Aberdeen, Scotland. His father, also George Pirie, was a prominent Aberdeen merchant and ship owner. His mother was Katherine (Catherine) Mitchell Pirie, a daughter of the Rev. Thomas Mitchell, of the parish of Tarves, Aberdeenshire. He was educated in Scotland and in London, where he was apprenticed to his relative, Sir John Pirie, at one time the Lord Mayor of London.

Pirie and his first wife, Mary Robieson, and their children, arrived in Canada in 1838. They settled in a Scottish settlement named Bon Accord after the town motto of Aberdeen. This settlement was located in Upper Nichol Township near present-day Elora. The transition to Canadian pioneer life was much more difficult than had been anticipated during the planning stages in Scotland. Pirie's wife died a few years later and was one of the earliest burials from the settlement. The Piries, formerly residents of downtown Aberdeen, had no prior experience with farming.

Pirie decided to abandon farming and purchase a newspaper. In 1848, he took over the two-year-old Guelph Herald and moved with his family to downtown Guelph. The printing and publishing office for the Herald was on Wyndham Street. The paper was printed once weekly and the office covered job printing and issued marriage licenses.

Pirie's correspondence to his eldest son George Mitchell Pirie detailed his struggles to make the newspaper profitable and collect payment for advertisements and subscriptions. He also faced lawsuits over content. They were often short staffed with his son, Alexander Fraser Pirie, running the Washington Press, and his second wife, Jane Booth, at work in the office – "Mamma is run off her feet". Another son, Charles Napier Pirie, worked at the paper, and other children may have assisted. During this time his priority was to pay his staff and in one letter to his son he wrote that they were now dangerously low in candles. In many cases he asked his son to search for potential advertisers in Hamilton, or chase after missed payments. In one case his son suggested that Pirie might attempt to take some work on the Canadian census to help make ends meet. The sale of his original farm Maryville was also a headache. His son arranged for the sale but the new landowner felt that he had overpaid and that the land was impossible to work and unprofitable.

Pirie was a poet, and was remembered as one of Canada's Scottish Canadian poets in a 1900 book published in Toronto by the Caledonia Society. His poetry generally dealt with Canadian patriotism, and social issues such as poverty, and temperance. One of his best known poems was "The Volunteers of Canada". He also tackled contemporary issues such as Louis Riel in his poem entitled "The Murder of Thomas Scott". He wrote on the Fenian Raids, the difficulties faced by new immigrants, the exploitation of textile workers, and Scottish history. His private and unpublished papers included some romantic poems, and poems relating to death and mourning. A selection of his poems were published in pamphlet form by the Guelph Herald as "Lyrics of the Late George Pirie, Esq." Much of his writing was lost in a house fire, although a booklet of handwritten unpublished poetry, primarily romantic, has been preserved.

His poetry in some cases reflected the particular experience of the displaced Scotsman in Canada:

Far from Clan Alpine Dhu,
Wanders the bonnet blue;
Still to that magnet true,
Turns his heart thither.
Far though his fate may part,
Land of his love thou art,
Ever the Scottish heart
Warms to the heather.

As to his writing ability, the following statement appeared in Selections from Scottish Canadian Poetry (1900): "William Lyon Mackenzie, a Scotsman like himself, although opposed to him in politics, said of him that he was one of the ablest writers in Canada."

Pirie' Canadian patriotism was evident not only in his poetry:

So enthusiastic was his patriotism, that at the time of the Trent Affair (1861) though then a feeble old man, he gallantly joined the Scottish company formed in the town at that time, and drilled night after night, to be able to take his place among his country's defenders.

Pirie was particularly close to his son George Mitchell Pirie. The younger Pirie was a merchant in Dundas, Ontario. Mr. G. M. Pirie assisted Pirie on many business matters including the sale of his Bon Accord farm, and following up on newspaper advertising clients in the Dundas and Hamilton area. The correspondence between father and son are preserved today in the form of about 20 letters.

By November 1869, Pirie was quite ill due to complications from severe asthma. He felt that he had first acquired the condition in 1819 during a visit to the island of Anticosti after which he had his first attack. After that he was often ill – "...it was long a matter of wonder how he bore up so well under his affliction." He continued to write for the newspaper until just 3 weeks before his death. His correspondence was as frequent and as clear as ever and he was busily conducting his business affairs up to his last days through numerous letters to his son in Dundas, Ontario.

His funeral was described as "one of the most mournful sights ever seen in Guelph". His obituary in the Guelph Herald included the following statement about Pirie's character:

Although ever ready to assist the poor emigrant or wayfarer, no matter what his nationality might be, he loved his native land and his "brither Scots" with a love which was unquenchable. We have often, when speaking of his native land and its dearly cherished associations, seen his lips quiver, and the tear start in his eye, as with faltering accents he recounted its history, dwelt lovingly on its scenery, or recalled his youthful days spent there, with all their fondly remembered reminiscences.

Pirie has numerous descendants across Canada, the United States, England, Australia, New Zealand, and Costa Rica. He is buried at Woodlawn Cemetery (formerly Union Cemetery) in Guelph, Ontario, and his grave is one of the earlier burials.
