= Alexander Fraser Pirie =

Canadian journalist and newspaper editor

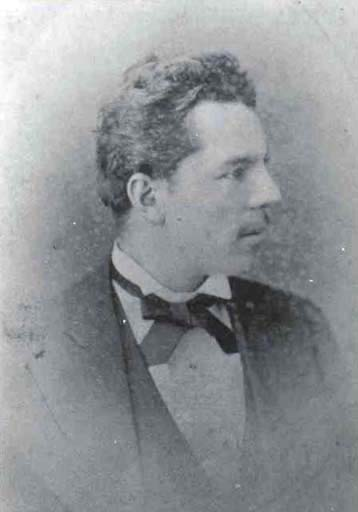
- Alexander Fraser Pirie, 1849-1903
- Born: October 1, 1849; Guelph, Canada West
- Died: August 15, 1903 (aged 53); Dundas, Ontario, Canada
- Occupations: journalist, newspaper editor

Alexander Fraser Pirie (October 1, 1849 – August 15, 1903) was a Canadian journalist and newspaper editor.

== Life ==
Pirie was born in Guelph, Upper Canada, to George Pirie, a native of Aberdeen, Scotland. His mother was Jane Booth, born in Lonmay Aberdeenshire to a family from the Isle of Noss in the Shetland Islands.

George Pirie emigrated to Upper Canada with a group of Aberdeen merchants and businessmen. The family arrived in 1838 and joined the Bon Accord settlement located in the vicinity of Elora. He arrived with his first wife, Mary Robieson, and their children. She died not long after her settlement in Canada, and Mr. Pirie married Miss Jane Booth.

In 1848, George Pirie became the publisher of the Guelph Herald newspaper after his attempt at farming in the Bon Accord community. The farm was sold and the family moved to Guelph where he ran the Guelph Herald publishing and printing office on Wyndham Street. The elder Pirie was a staunch conservative and Scottish Canadian poet.

As a young man, Alexander Fraser Pirie assisted at his father's newspaper office. The paper struggled to maintain circulation and relied upon job printing work. Imprint magazine later described these early days in a profile of Pirie:

"He first saw the light of publication day in his father's office, the Guelph Herald, in 1849, and was brought up to the sound of the mallet and planer, the hammering of wooden quoins in the chases and the incessant cry of "Color!" on the part of the man who pulled the lever of the Washington press. The principal event of his early life was stirring the glue and molasses over a hot fire when the foreman decided to cast a new roller, the making of a new roller being at that time regarded as an epoch in the history of all well-regulated country printing offices."

At 21 years of age, after his father's death in 1870, Pirie became publisher of The Herald. During this time he took on the numerous duties of a local newspaper which included the issuing of marriage licenses. At this time he received a letter from John A. Macdonald authorizing him as the local agent for these licenses. However, Pirie had a great desire to work as a journalist in a larger city, and two years later moved on to Toronto. In 1924, The Herald was absorbed by the Guelph Mercury.

By 1874, Pirie was working at The Toronto Sun as a columnist. From a circa 1876 article:

"The Sun...still retains one of the most fertile humorists in Canada in the person of Mr. Alexander Pirie, commonly known as the "Sun Skit Urchin". This gentleman, who is still very young, finds plenty of work for the scissors of his contemporaries in a daily column of "Sun Skits." They abound in reckless humor, sparing no one, and have just the pleasant bitterness of a dry curacoa. They have now flowed forth in an uninterrupted stream for nearly two years, and neither the supply nor quality shows any signs of falling off".

A caricature of Pirie as the "Sun Skit Urchin" appeared in Grip magazine at this time. Grip magazine was Canada's version of the satirical British magazine Punch. While Pirie was also a contributor to Grip, these contributions were submitted anonymously. He also penned several articles for Saturday Night. "Rambles About Rimouski" was a story of the history of Rimouski, Quebec.

Pirie was a popular editorial columnist, as well as social figure and public speaker. During the 1870s, he lived with his mother and other family members on Mutual Street in Toronto. This house, now demolished, was in the vicinity of where Toronto Metropolitan University now stands. He was in demand as a public speaker, and known for his use of political humour. Throughout his years in Toronto Pirie was present at many of the city's social events, such as an 1885 reading by Robert Kirkland Kernighan. His speaking engagements ranged from reviews of his European travels to speeches in support of Liberal political candidates.

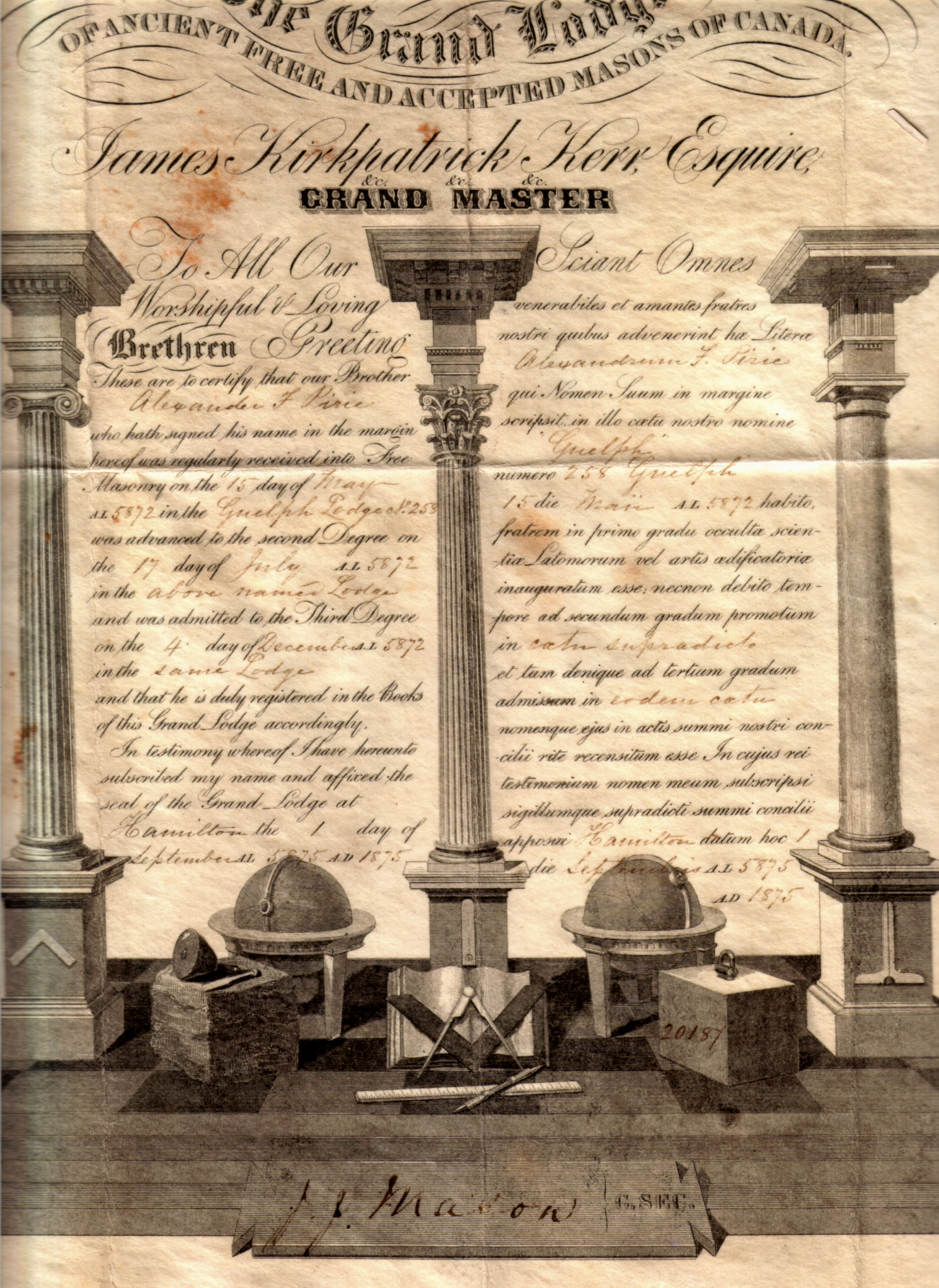
A. F. Pirie's Masonic Certificate, 1875.

Pirie was accepted as a Mason on September 1, 1875, at the Grand Lodge at Hamilton, Ontario. This would have enhanced many social connections in Victorian era Toronto.

In 1876, Pirie joined the Toronto Telegram. He was best known as the second editor of the Telegram, a role he held until 1888. The Telegram was founded in 1876 by John Ross Robertson as a paper devoted to Toronto's interests, and, as Robertson described it, devoted to "today's news to-day"

Pirie spent his first year at the Telegram working under the historian John Charles Dent. After that he took on the role of editor which he held until 1888.

A 1923 review of the history of Toronto newspapers commented on Pirie's time at the Telegram: "Then came Mr. A. F. Pirie, one of the wittiest and most companionable of men, whose paragraphs, straight-flung and barbed at the point, enlarged public interest in the enterprise".

In 1886, Pirie participated in a literary debate relating to Canada's role in North America and her relationship with the United States. Articles under the heading "Canadian Prospects and Politics" were submitted to The North American Review for the January 1886 issue (Volume 142, Issue 350) by the Marquis of Lorne and A. F. Pirie with a brief note from Sir John A. Macdonald.

In February 1893, Pirie was elected president of the Canadian Press Association. In this capacity he spoke on behalf of Canadian interests at the World Press Conference in Chicago, Illinois. In a May 29, 1893, article from the Toronto Mail, "Good Words for Canada: Plain Talk at the Press Convention", it was reported that Canada had the "honor of closing the proceedings of the ninth annual convention of the National Editorial Association" with the last address delivered by A. F. Pirie. Mr. Pirie also represented the Canadian Press Association at the World's Press Congress. The reporter felt that "He said some good words for Canada, reminding his hearers that there were a hundred thousand Canadians in Chicago alone..." Also, that Pirie had noted the role women had been taking in the press congress and stated that as the public journals were made for men and women, ..."there seemed to be no good reason that women as well as men should not bear a part in making them". Finally, he made a strong plea for closer trade relations between the U.S. and Canada: "...holding it to be a shame and an outrage that Canadian workmen should be shut out of the United States, and Canadian products subjected to a high duty, after all the Canadians had done for the United States at the time of the civil war, when 40,000 took up arms for the union, and all that Canadians in the States are still doing in building up that country". He appealed to the journalists of America for fair play for Canada.

Pirie's work attracted many admirers. Imprint magazine, in profiling the new President of the Canadian Press Association wrote in reference to his 1889 William Notman portrait which was published within the article: "The portrait does not do justice to its subject: to do so it would require to be a "speaking likeness", for our friend is just as handy with his tongue as he is with his pen—he is a born orator as well as journalist." Commenting on his career, Imprint noted: "Mr. Pirie is a writer of great versatility, a capital speaker, one of the best-natured men in the profession, and publishes a model country weekly..."; and on his popularity: "He is one of the most popular of our Canadian journalists, a believer in his country and its future, and is a good representative of the men who make Canadian newspapers."

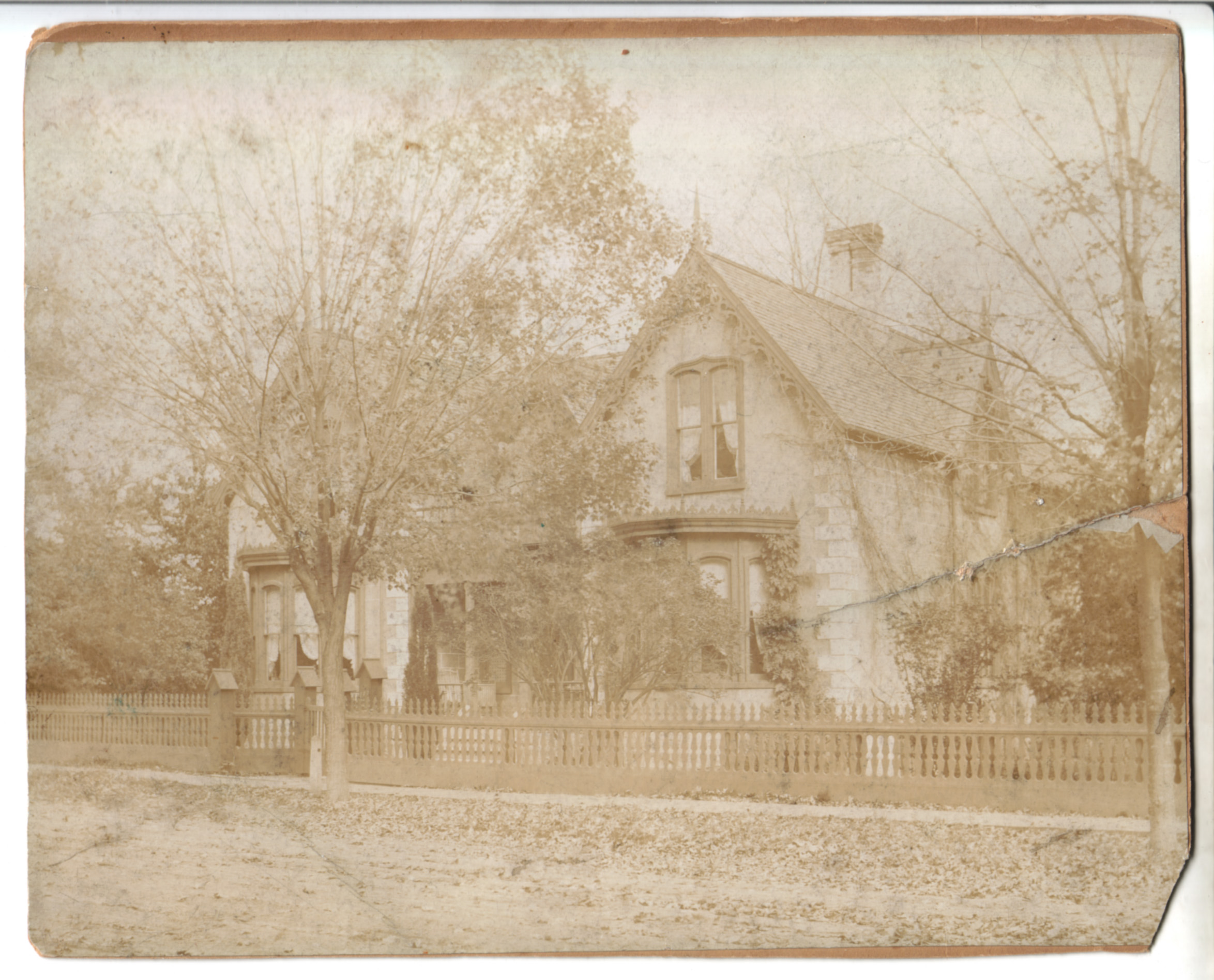
Mr. & Mrs. A. F. Pirie's residence, Sydenham Lodge, Dundas, Ontario, Canada. Circa 1890s.

He married Hester Emma McCausland in Toronto on June 12, 1889, at her father's home on Jarvis Street. Miss McCausland's father Joseph McCausland had been in Toronto since the 1820s and was a native of Armagh, Ireland, and founder of a successful Toronto stained glass window firm. The newly married couple moved to Montreal where Pirie briefly worked as an Editor at the Montreal Star. At this time, they were photographed by Canada's top portrait photographer William Notman. By 1889, they returned to Dundas, Ontario and purchased a home on Sydenham Street that they named "Sydenham Lodge". Four children were born in Dundas during the 1890s: Russell Fraser, Elsie Gowan, Jean Booth and Goldwin McCausland. In recent years, this home was used for the filming of one episode in Season Six of The West Wing.

In 1895, Pirie lost his mother, Jane (Booth) Pirie, who fell ill after a visit to Dundas from her Toronto home. Jane Pirie had actively assisted in her husband's publishing and printing business in Guelph, and in the 1890s had drafted an account of her travels to Western Canada which Mr. Pirie published in the Dundas Banner.

Pirie was interested in politics and during the Parliamentary session of 1888 he had represented the Montreal Star in the press gallery at Ottawa.

In the Provincial General Election of 1898, Pirie had received a Reform nomination as a candidate for North Wentworth. This was not successful, and afterwards he worked for the Liberal Party of Canada, often appearing as a public speaker, or editing work destined for publication. He appeared in Brantford, Ontario, on behalf of the Hon. William Paterson for the election of 1900. At that time, the audience rose to its feet in a standing ovation. Pirie began his speech noting that his reputation as a humorist preceded him, however, in this case, he had some serious issues to cover.

Pirie's wife died of pneumonia in 1901 after a brief illness. She was only 43 years old. After this time, Pirie's health broke down and he limited his public engagements. He continued some of his work for the Liberal Party of Canada and public speaking engagements. According to newspaper accounts after his death, his relatives noted that he began to stay indoors for much of the time. His cousin, Robinson Pirie of Hamilton, began to visit him to urge him to get out. In 1901, he attended a conference for the Canadian Press Association held in Charlottetown, P.E.I. Pirie wrote to his sister-in-law in Toronto (Mrs. Boyce Thompson) that many events had lost their lustre. He told her that he and his wife had always dreamt of returning to Toronto after the children grew up. He described the regular visits he made to his wife's grave on Sundays.

In July 1903, Pirie visited relatives in Brandon, Manitoba, in conjunction with some work for the Liberal party. Relatives hoped that this trip might improve his state of mind. After his return to Dundas, he died at home on August 15, 1903. This event shocked the community. In a letter preserved at the Whitehern museum archives, Mrs. McQuesten wrote to her son Rev. Calvin McQuesten in Montreal about the event.

Pirie's pallbearers included John Ross Robertson of the Toronto Telegram. He was buried in Grove Cemetery next to his wife. Four children were left without parents. The children's guardian was their paternal aunt, Ada L. Pirie (Mrs. Walpole Murdoch), who had been assisting Pirie since the death of her sister-in-law.

Pirie's youngest son, Goldwin McCausland Pirie (1894–1915), died of wounds received at the Second Battle of Ypres during the First World War. A soldier with the 1st Battalion Western Ontario Regiment, Goldwin Pirie was selected to work as a bomb thrower due to his athletic ability. He had attended Trinity College School in Port Hope where he was well respected as a member of their football rugby team. The 1st battalion participated in a counterattack after the gas attacks, and Goldwin Pirie was hit by a shell during this assault. He lay wounded for several days upon the battlefield before he was picked up and transported for further care. He died at Netley (Royal Victoria Hospital) in England about two months after he was wounded. Pirie, known as Goldie, sent several articles back to Dundas for publication in the Dundas Star in 1914 while he was in training at Valcartier Camp, Quebec. He wrote his articles with a humorous bent in the tradition of his father.

In 1918, The Hamilton Review published an article on Pirie by Sir John Willison (of The Globe) who had been profiling political and public personalities from Canada's past. He wrote:

"But Mr. Pirie was more than a jester. He had qualities of heart and mind which were seldom revealed and only to those who had his affection and confidence. These were few, for beneath an apparent openness and spontaneity there was a reserve which was not easily penetrated. He got much out of life, but not all that he desired. Happy but often anxious and foreboding...when I think of Pirie I recall what was said of Shelley: 'He passed through life like a strange bird upon a great journey, singing always of the paradise to which he was travelling, and suddenly lost from the sight of men in the midst of his song.' "

== Gallery ==
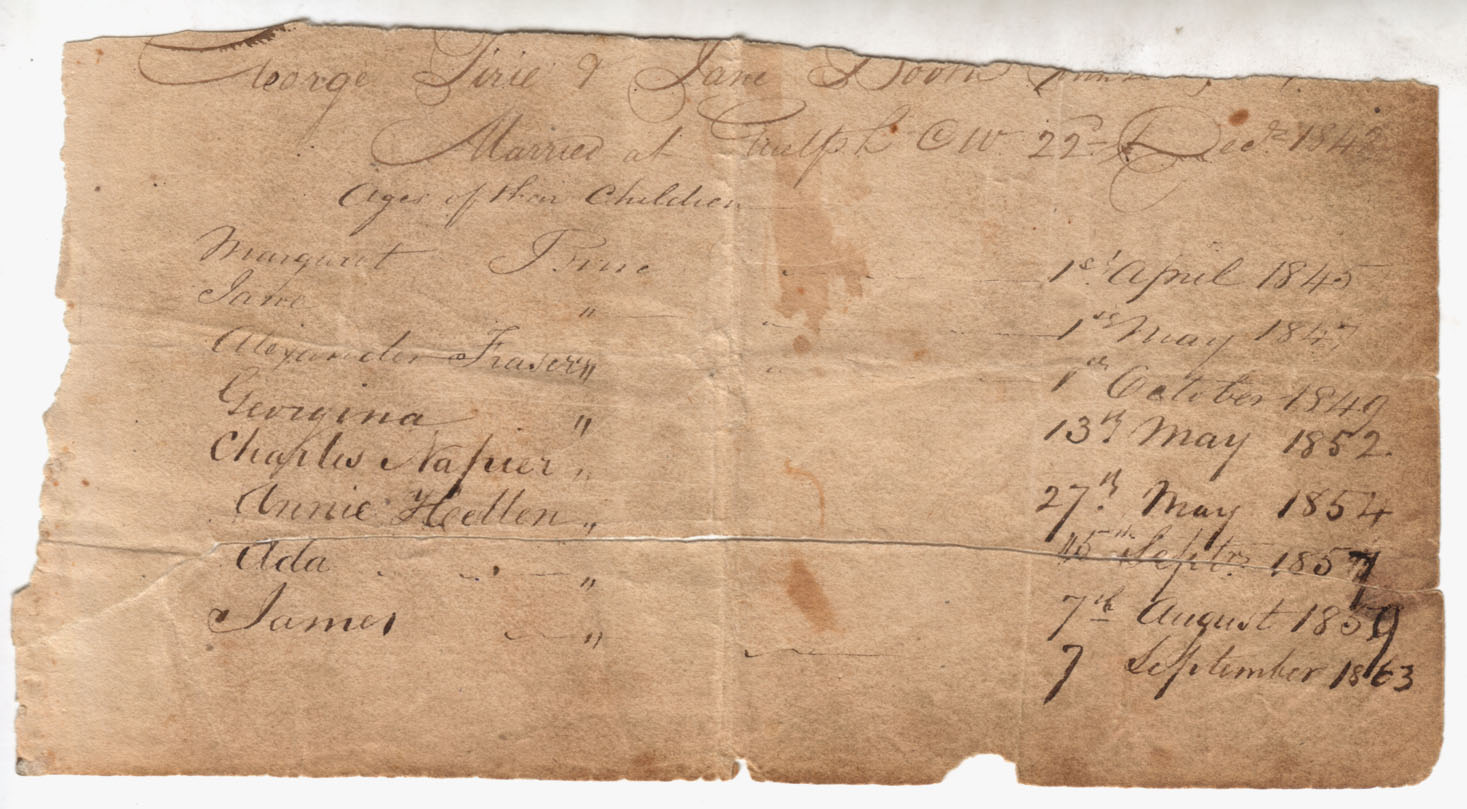
Original handwritten family record for the children of George Pirie and Jane Booth, Guelph, Ontario.

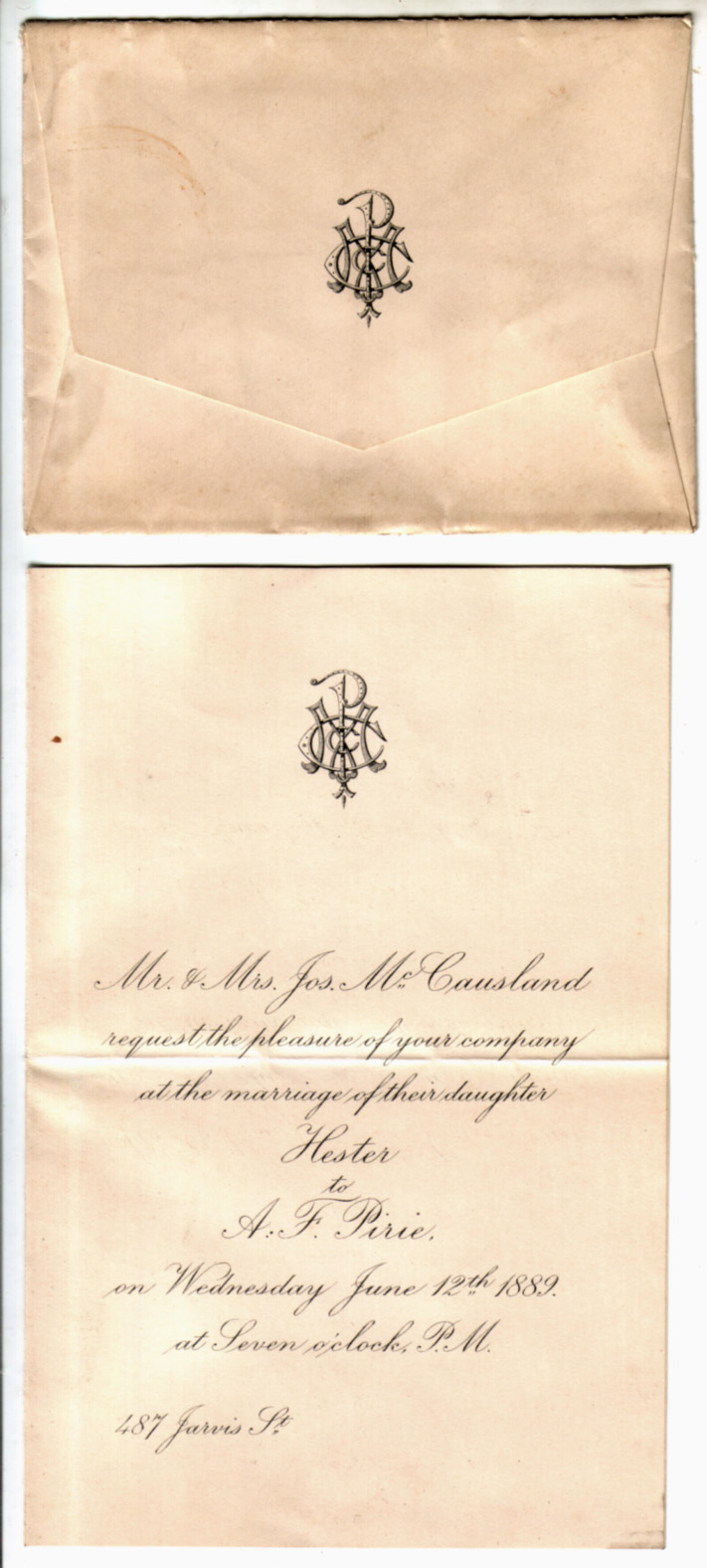
Original Wedding Invitation for the marriage of Alexander Fraser Pirie & Hester Emma McCausland, June 12, 1889, Toronto, Ontario, Canada.

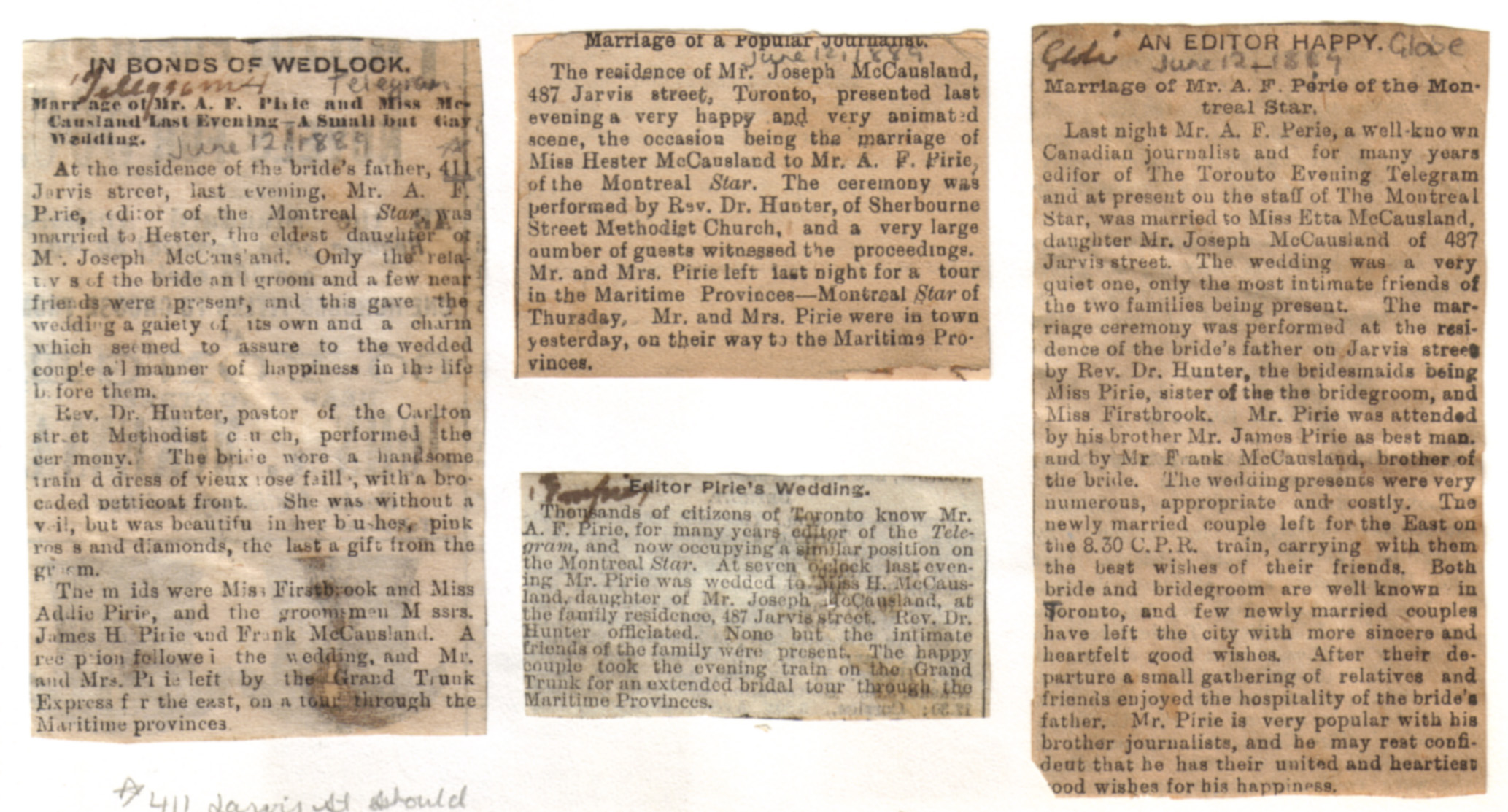
Notices appearing in the Canadian newspapers regarding A. F. Pirie's marriage in 1889 (Toronto).

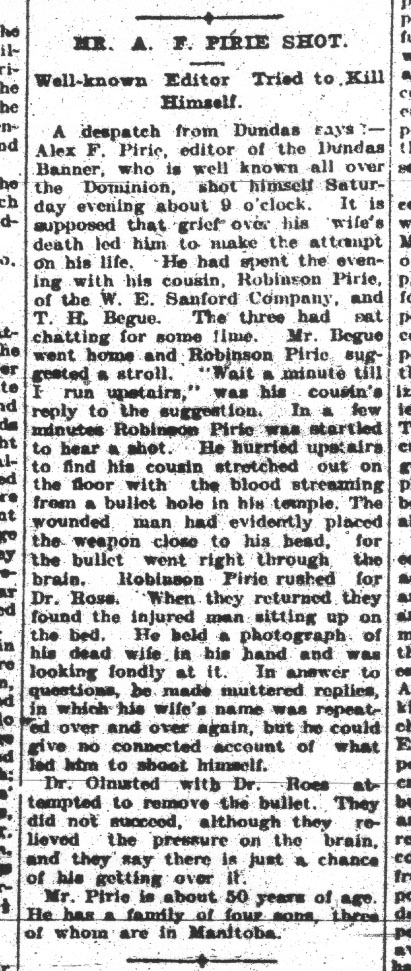
"Mr A. F. Pirie Shot" August 12, 1903, Burlington Gazette, pg. 2.

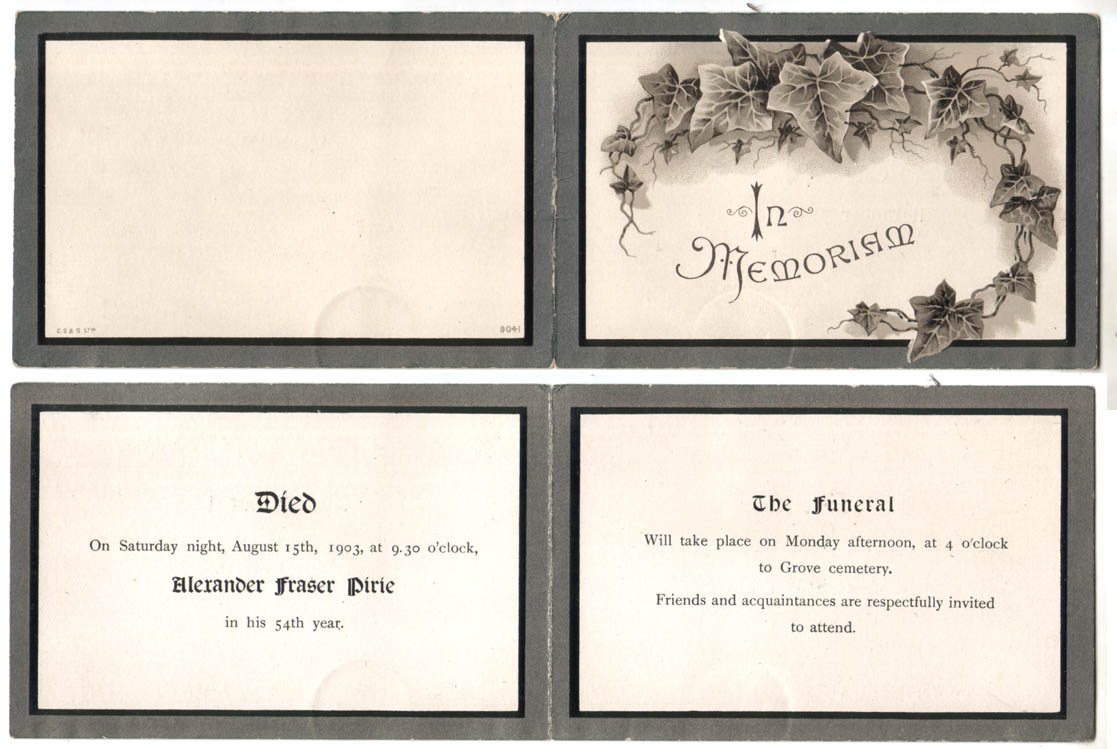
A. F. Pirie's Original Funeral Card, Dundas, Ontario, August 1903.

== Sources & further reading ==
- The Macmillan Dictionary of Canadian Biography. Fourth edition. Edited by W. Stewart Wallace. Revised, enlarged, and updated by W.A. McKay. Toronto: Macmillan of Canada, 1978.
- The Canadian Men and Women of the Time. First edition. Edited by Henry James Morgan. Toronto: Wm. Briggs, 1898. A. F. Pirie: pg. 822.
- Toronto: Past and Present / A Handbook of the City. C. Pelham Mulvany (Toronto: W. E. Caiger Publisher, 1884). A. F. Pirie (on his role as editor of the Telegram): pp. 123, 218. Toronto Evening Telegram history: pp. 193–194.
- The Municipality of Toronto / A History. Volume I. Toronto, 1923. "The Newspapers of Toronto". Mr. Pirie's role at the Evening Telegram is discussed on pg. 426.
- "Canadian Prospects and Politics". The North American Review. January 1886 (Volume 142, Issue 350). Articles by the Marquis of Lorne and A. F. Pirie with a brief note from Sir John A. Macdonald. A. F. Pirie, pp. 45-49.
- Imprint. Toronto & Winnipeg, June 1893 Vol. 1, No. 2. Publication of A. F. Pirie's speech at the 9th annual convention of the National Editorial Association at Chicago on May 7, 1893.
- Imprint. Toronto & Winnipeg, July–August 1893 Issue. Vol. 1, No. 3. Profile of Mr. Pirie as the new President of the Canadian Press Association.
- "Good Words for Canada – Plain Talk at the Press Convention". Toronto Mail, May 29, 1893.
- "Reminiscences of Late A. F. Pirie". Author: Sir John Willison for The Hamilton Review, June 14, 1918. Originally published in the Canadian Magazine.

== Newspaper articles ==
The following are a list of articles appearing shortly before Mr. Pirie's death, or obituaries.

Toronto Star – August 10, 11, 14, 15, 17, 1903. Toronto Evening Telegram – August 17, 1903. Globe (Toronto) – August 10, 11, 13, 17, 1903 Hamilton Spectator – August 10, 11, 12, 13, 1903. Burlington Gazette – August 12, 1903, pg. 2 & 4. August 19, 1903. Dundas Banner – August 20, 1903. Calgary Herald – August 17, 1903.

The Brandon Daily Sun – August 10, 1903. Link to Original August 17, 1903. Link to Original August 21, 1903. Link to Original

Other articles:

The Imprint, Vol. 1, No. 2, June 1893 "The Great Press Congress" Chicago, Illinois. Address delivered by A. F. Pirie

The Imprint, Vol. 1, No. 3, July-August 1893 "President of the Canadian Press Association". Background information about A. F. Pirie, the new President

Pirie attends Toronto reading by Robert Kirkland Kernighan in 1885.

== Correspondence ==
Private Collection (Marika Pirie):

- A. F. Pirie to R. Fraser Pirie: August 3, 1900.
- A. F. Pirie to Ida (McCausland)Thompson: August 12, 1901, September 30, 1902, and May 2, 1903.
- Re: Charlottetown Press Conference: December 19, 1901.
- A. F. Pirie to Boyce Thompson: February 14, 1901.
- Whitehern Archives, Hamilton, Ontario holds 3 letters referring to Mr. Pirie: W5063 TO [REV.] CALVIN MCQUESTEN from his sister Hilda McQuesten (1903/8/10). W5074 TO [REV.] CALVIN MCQUESTEN from his mother, Mary Baker McQuesten (1903/8/14). W5078 - TO [REV.] CALVIN MCQUESTEN from his mother, Mary Baker McQuesten (1903/8/18)
