= Robert Pirie =

Robert Pirie may refer to:

- Robert S. Pirie (1934–2015), American bibliophile and lawyer
- Robert B. Pirie (1905–1990), Vice Admiral in the United States Navy
- Robert B. Pirie Jr. (born 1933), Assistant Secretary of the United States Navy
- Bob Pirie (1916–1984), Canadian freestyle swimmer

== See also ==
- Pirie (disambiguation)
