= George Pirie =

George Pirie may refer to:

- George Pirie (publisher) (1799–1870), Canadian newspaper publisher
- Sir George Pirie (artist) (1863–1946), Scottish artist
- George Alexander Pirie (1864–1929), Scottish radiologist
- Sir George Pirie (RAF officer) (1896–1980), British air marshal
- George Pirie (politician), Canadian politician, elected to the Legislative Assembly of Ontario in 2022
- George Pirie (mathematician), Scottish mathematician
