= Pirie (disambiguation) =

Pirie is a surname.

Pirie may also refer to:

- Pirie Peninsula, Laurie Island, British Antarctic Territory
- Pirie Street, Adelaide, South Australia
- HMAS Pirie (J189), a Royal Australian Navy Second World War corvette
- HMAS Pirie (ACPB 87), a patrol boat
- Pirie MacDonald (1867–1942), American portrait photographer, civic leader and peace activist
- Karen Pirie, a fictional Scottish detective created by Val McDermid

== See also ==
- Port Pirie (disambiguation), articles associated with the city in South Australia
- Piri (disambiguation)
