= Port Pirie Post Office =

Heritage-listed post office in Australia

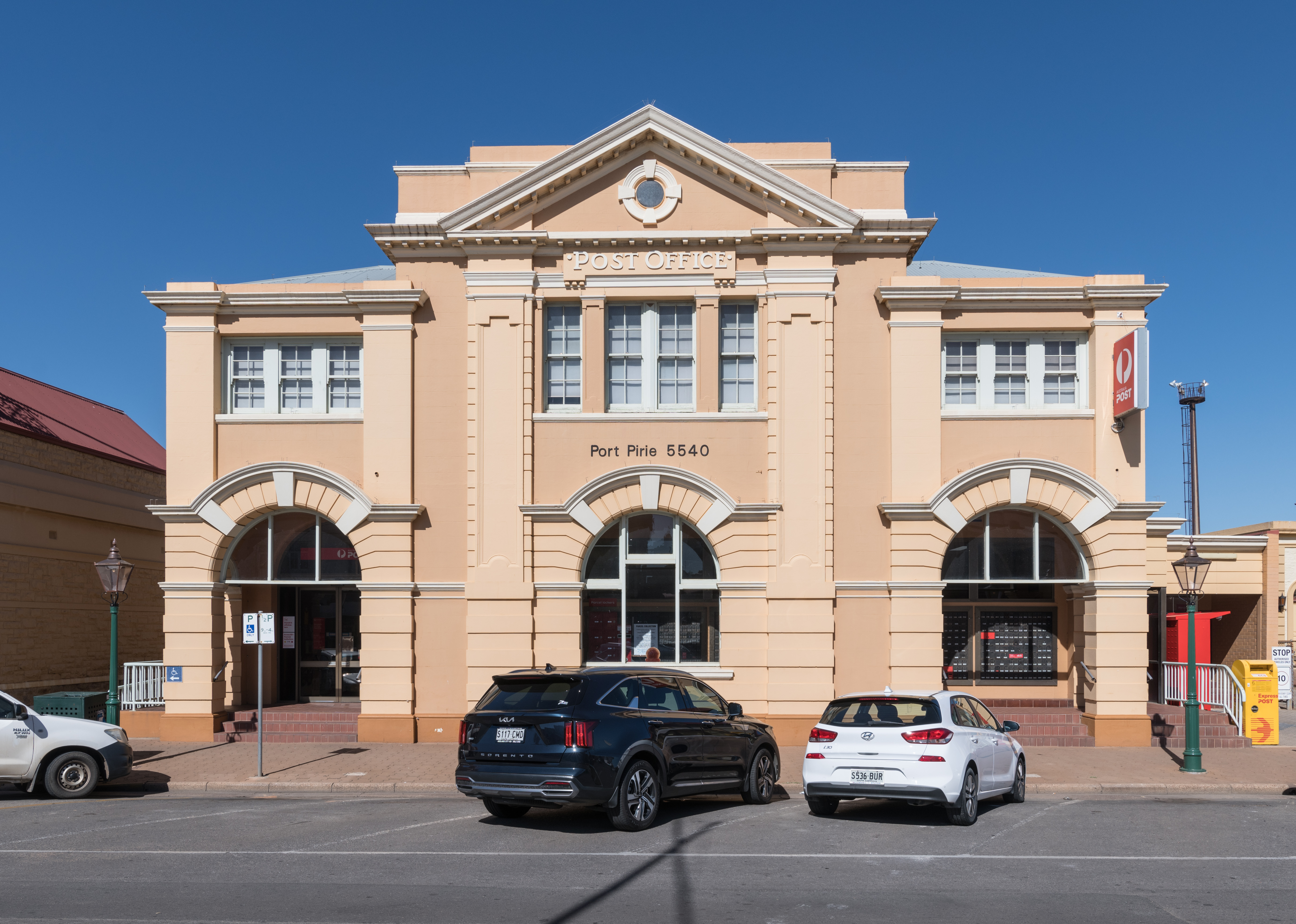

- Location within South Australia
- 33°10′34″S 138°00′38″E
- Location: 79–83 Ellen Street Port Pirie, South Australia, Australia

Commonwealth Heritage List
- Type: Listed place (Historic)
- Designated: 8 November 2011
- Reference no.: 106137

The Port Pirie Post Office is a heritage-listed post office at 79–83 Ellen Street, Port Pirie, South Australia. It was designed by Edward Woods and built in 1880, with extensions designed by Charles Owen-Smyth built in 1905–1907. It was added to the South Australian Heritage Register on 12 October 1995 and added to the Commonwealth Heritage List on 8 November 2011.

== Significance ==
The Port Pirie Post Office, constructed in 1880 and expanded in 1905, reflects the prosperity and consolidation of the town in this period, as it evolved into an important port serving an agricultural region in South Australia. The post office also retained an important role in the town after it experienced further expansion in the twentieth century, in line with the town's association with the BHP lead smelter, established in 1889 and by the mid-1930s the largest single-unit lead-smelting works in the world. By the 1950s, Port Pirie had attained the status of South Australia's first provincial city. The post office, as one of an important group of commercial and public buildings in Port Pirie, helps demonstrate the economic development of the region.

Typologically, Port Pirie is a relatively externally intact example (intact to its 1905 form) of a second generation post office designed to service a large regional centre. It also contains elements of Port Pirie's first permanent post office at the rear. Major alterations early in the building's history reflect the significantly increased volume and status of the place, and enhanced the primary concept of public frontal components with duality relating to post and telegraphic functions. Although altered, the original recessed porches are evident and the internal planning still demonstrates programmatic requirements and the inclusion of a first floor residential component. Stylistically, the post office is an accomplished and bold example of Edwardian Baroque Revival architecture, the first applied to post office design in South Australia, and subsequently favoured by Government architect, Charles Edward Owen Smyth. Important characteristics include the large scale, strong civic presence and monumentality, and relationship with other important civic buildings and nearby administrative functions including rail transport.

Port Pirie Post Office is a prominent building in an historic streetscape which in turn contains a collection of robust civic buildings, including the adjoining and exuberant former railway station with which the post office has an important visual relationship. More generally, the post office maintains its expressive qualities and a harmonious relationship with its surroundings. The 1905 form and appearance) is a highly accomplished example of the Edwardian Baroque Revival and the first thoroughgoing, grand manner, modern Baroque Revival post office in South Australia. The building also has social value as a prominent public building in an important historic streetscape and the main commercial and civic precinct of Port Pirie, which has had an enduring association with the Port Pirie community for over 120 years through the provision of postal and telecommunication services.

The significant components of Port Pirie Post Office include the main postal building comprising fabric dating from 1880 through 1905, with the main façade to Ellen Street dating from the latter works.

== History ==
The first post office in Port Pirie opened in 1873, at a time of economic growth and development which in turn was a consequence of agricultural expansion in this area of South Australia, with the town fulfilling the need for a port to serve the agricultural region. Money order facilities were also established and a telegraph office opened in 1874. Tenders were called for the construction of a new post office building in 1880. The tender was awarded to J Fitzpatrick on 27 May 1880, who completed the building in December of that year. The town of Port Pirie then underwent new development after the opening of a lead smelter by BHP in 1889; this was later further expanded until, by 1934, it was the largest single-unit lead-smelting works in the world. Alterations were also carried out in 1898–1899 to the post office, with the addition of two lobbies, one for telegraph purposes and the other for money order and savings bank business. Photos from c. 1905 and 1907 also show the addition of a new two-storied front in this period which effectively buried the 1880 design; the new addition had Edwardian Baroque detailing. The residential quarters were moved upstairs, indicated by two recessed balconies on either side of a central breakfront. Based on historic photographs, these were probably glassed in after the 1930s. A verandah canopy was added in 1920 and removed in 1945. (Warmington and Ward; SA State Heritage Register assessment) In the 1950s Port Pirie was proclaimed as South Australia's first provincial city.

Architects:

- Architect-in-Chief: Edward Woods (1880 work)
- Superintendent of Public Buildings: Charles Owen-Smyth (1905–07 work)
- Commonwealth Department of Works and Railways: (1921–22 work)

=== Timeline ===
- 1880: Original single-storey post office constructed
- 1899: Telephone exchange added and lobbies for telegraph and money order-banking added around this time.
- 1905–07: Two-storey Edwardian Baroque front added to building providing postmaster's quarters at first floor, effectively burying the original building. This included two recessed upstairs balconies and two arched openings providing access to the central postal hall. It would appear that these alterations also included an additional bay along the north side elevation and the reconstruction of part of the original roof directly behind the new two-storied section and over the north bay to create a lantern over a new mail room (now post shop). The new upstairs component, quite shallow in plan, was delineated by two open, but recessed, balconies and a domestically figured central upper window (the balconies were filled in around the 1940s). It was connected to the ground floor by a square stairwell placed where the front entry had previously been.
- 1919–22: Commonwealth Works and Railways alterations including a triple-arched cast iron verandah (removed in 1945).
- c.1940s: Enclosure of first floor balconies.
- 1945–56: Acquisition of site for Postmaster's residence (separate allotment which would have involved the subsequent removal of this function from the original building).
- 1949–59: Acquisition of additional land (unknown but possibly for construction of south wing mail room).
- 1966: The northeast corner was filled in as part of a new storage and toilet area and a cream brick mail room was constructed on the southern side of the building. The upper floor was subsequently converted to a lunch room and staff facility which involved the incorporation of the southern balcony into the kitchen area and removal of a partition wall between a former bedroom and sitting room.
- 1970s: Staff amenities were refurbished.
- 1981: Major internal and external refurbishment works including alterations within front bay to create new post box area, loggia and entrance.
- 1996: Construction of new loading dock shelter, disabled access ramp and internal refurbishment of post shop area. This work involved the reconfiguration of the front ground floor bay to provide additional post boxes and loggia/porch and new post shop area in the former mail room. This work involved the removal of the main entrances to the former postal hall, creation of a new arched entrance at the northwest corner, incorporation of the former postmaster's office at the northwest corner into the new post shop and incorporation of the former telegraph room into the post box room. Ramps and awnings in the rear yard were also constructed at this time. A skillion roofed side canopy may date from this later period.

== Description ==
The post office site is located within the principal commercial and civic precinct in Port Pirie. It is flanked to the north by the former railway station, to the south by the former customs house and to the east by the rail yards and port. When constructed, and until c.1937, the railway ran along Ellen Street, in front of the building. The rear asphalted yard is accessed via a driveway situated on the southern side of the building. It contains a freestanding steel-clad shed and gates in the side fences link the yard with the adjoining rail yards and port area. The driveway is partly covered by a steel-framed loading bay canopy which dates from 1996.

The core of the current Post Office is a stone Italianate building, single-storied, constructed in 1880. This had stucco quoins, boxed eaves with intermittent paired brackets, round-arched windows with heavy stone sills, a cast-iron verandah and a central pediment, broken on the underside to allow a clock installation. The south side elevation of Woods’ design remained visible from an oblique angle from Ellen street until the construction of an enlarged mail room in 1966; for purposes of the ‘original’ building, though, the 1899–1905 alterations have been in place for over 100 years. What remains of the 1880s structure is buried at the centre of the complex, making up part of the present back office, counter area and toilets.

As viewed from Ellen Street, the Port Pirie Post Office is a double-storey, symmetrical composition of rendered brick construction with a central pediment break front. The central bay is flanked by a pair of arched entrances, and the ground floor dado is defined by heavily rusticated banding and voussoirs to each of the three arched openings at that level. The central bay has since been opened to the flanking porches to provide a continuous ‘loggia’ in front of private letter box bays. The northern porch provides the main entrance to the present post shop, a conversion of the former mail room, which is defined by a roof lantern. The southern porch has been screened by a covered walkway on the south side, linking the front loggia with a 1960s wing to the south of the main building which is also fronted by private box bays. The original private entrance is located at the junction of these wings.

At first floor level, the flanking bays, originally open porches, have been infilled with timber-framed double-hung window sashes. The floor levels are linked by full height stylised pilasters. The north side elevation steps down from two floor levels at the front, to single storey at the rear, the latter relating to the lantern-roofed mail room. Each bay contains round-arched window openings, unified by continuous string courses and archivolts. It would appear unlikely that any original fabric from the 1880s side porch in this location remains intact, though it may be evident at plinth level. Beyond this to the east, a much lower non-original concrete block structure wraps around the northeast corner of the original 1880s wing.

== Condition and integrity ==
At the time of its Commonwealth Heritage List listing, the Port Pirie Post Office was found to have a reasonably high level of intactness and integrity to its 1905 date of development when viewed from the street. Despite the integration of the central hall space into the flanking porches, the construction of rear and side additions, and the infill to the first floor porches, the building retains the ability to demonstrate its dual functionality, its stylistic qualities and architectural conception. This ability is heightened by the relationship which is maintained between the post office and the adjoining civic buildings and port.

Internally, a succession of alterations associated with changes to the program and general refurbishment have greatly diminished the building's ability to demonstrate the original planning and function, particularly at ground floor level. By contrast, the first floor area retains a much higher level of intactness with respect to planning, form and fabric, albeit refurbishment on a superficial level.

Internally and externally, the building appears to be in relatively sound structural condition with the exception of some wall cracking and water ingress at first floor level.

== Official values – Commonwealth Heritage List ==
Criterion A – Processes

The Port Pirie Post Office, constructed in 1880 and expanded in 1905, reflects the prosperity and consolidation of the town in this period, as it evolved into an important port serving an agricultural region in South Australia. The post office also retained an important role in the town after it experienced further expansion in the twentieth century, in line with the town's association with the BHP lead smelter, established in 1889 and by the mid-1930s the largest single-unit lead-smelting works in the world. By the 1950s, Port Pirie had attained the status of South Australia's first provincial city. The post office, as one of an important group of commercial and public buildings in Port Pirie, helps demonstrate the economic development of the region.

The significant components of Port Pirie Post Office include the main postal building comprising fabric dating from 1880 through 1905, with the main façade to Ellen Street dating from the latter works.

Criterion D – Characteristic values

Port Pirie Post Office is an example of:

- Post office and telegraph office with quarters (second generation typology 1870–1929)
- Edwardian Baroque Style
- The work of Government architect, CT Owen-Smyth

Typologically, Port Pirie is a relatively externally intact example (intact to its 1905 form) of a second generation post office designed to service a large regional centre. It also contains elements of Port Pirie's first permanent post office at the rear. Major alterations early in the building's history reflect the significantly increased volume and status of the place, and enhanced the primary concept of public frontal components with duality relating to post and telegraphic functions. Although altered, the original recessed porches are evident and the internal planning still demonstrates programmatic requirements and the inclusion of a first floor residential component.

Stylistically, the post office is an accomplished and bold example of Edwardian Baroque Revival architecture, the first applied to post office design in South Australia, and subsequently favoured by Government architect, CE Owen Smyth, whose hand is clearly evident in the design. Important characteristics include the large scale, strong civic presence and monumentality, and relationship with other important civic buildings and nearby administrative functions including rail transport.

Criterion E – Aesthetic characteristics

Port Pirie Post Office is an important and prominent building in an historic streetscape which in turn contains a collection of robust civic buildings, including the adjoining and exuberant former railway station with which the post office has an important visual relationship. More generally, the post office maintains its expressive qualities and a harmonious relationship with its surroundings and is a powerful component of the main Port Pirie commercial and civic precinct, together with the nearby docks and neighbouring former police station and customs house.

Criterion F – Technical achievement

Port Pirie Post Office (1905 form and appearance) is a highly accomplished example of the Edwardian Baroque Revival and the first thoroughgoing, grand manner, modern Baroque Revival post office in South Australia.

Criterion G – Social value

The building, due it being a prominent public building in an important historic streetscape and the main commercial and civic precinct of Port Pirie, and which has had an enduring association with the Port Pirie community for over 120 years through the provision of postal and telecommunication services, has the potential to reach CHL threshold for this value.
