= Piri (disambiguation) =

Piri is the stage name of British musician Sophie McBurnie.

Piri may also refer to:

== People ==
=== Given name ===
- Piri Halasz (fl. 1966–2009), American art critic, educator and writer
- Piri Mehmed Pasha (died 1533), Grand Vizier of the Ottoman Empire in 1517
- Piri Peéry (born 1962), Hungarian actress
- Piri Poutapu (1905–1975), New Zealand Māori master carver and carpenter
- Piri Reis (c. 1465–c. 1554), Ottoman Empire admiral, geographer and cartographer
- Piri Thomas (1928–2011), writer and poet
- Piri Vaszary (1901–1965), Hungarian film actress
- Piri Weepu (born 1983), New Zealand rugby union footballer

=== Surname ===
- Hajji Piri (died 1690s), controller of the assay of the Safavid Empire in the early 1690s
- Kati Piri (born 1979), Hungarian-born Dutch politician and Member of the European Parliament (MEP)
- Mahdi Khajeh Piri (born 1955), founder of Noor International Microfilm Center, New Delhi
- Onurcan Piri (born 1994), Turkish footballer

== Places ==
- Piri, Angola, a town and commune
- Piri Planitia, a geological feature on Pluto
- Piri Rupes, a geological feature on Pluto

== Other ==
- Piri language, a Bantu language of the Democratic Republic of the Congo
- Piri (instrument), Korean woodwind musical instrument
- Piri (Sikhism), former missionary activities in Sikhism
- Miri piri, a concept in Sikhism

== See also ==
- Piri piri, a cultivar of Capsicum frutescens, one of the sources of chili pepper
- Peri (disambiguation)
- Pirie (disambiguation)
