= Robert Kirkland Kernighan =

Canadian journalist

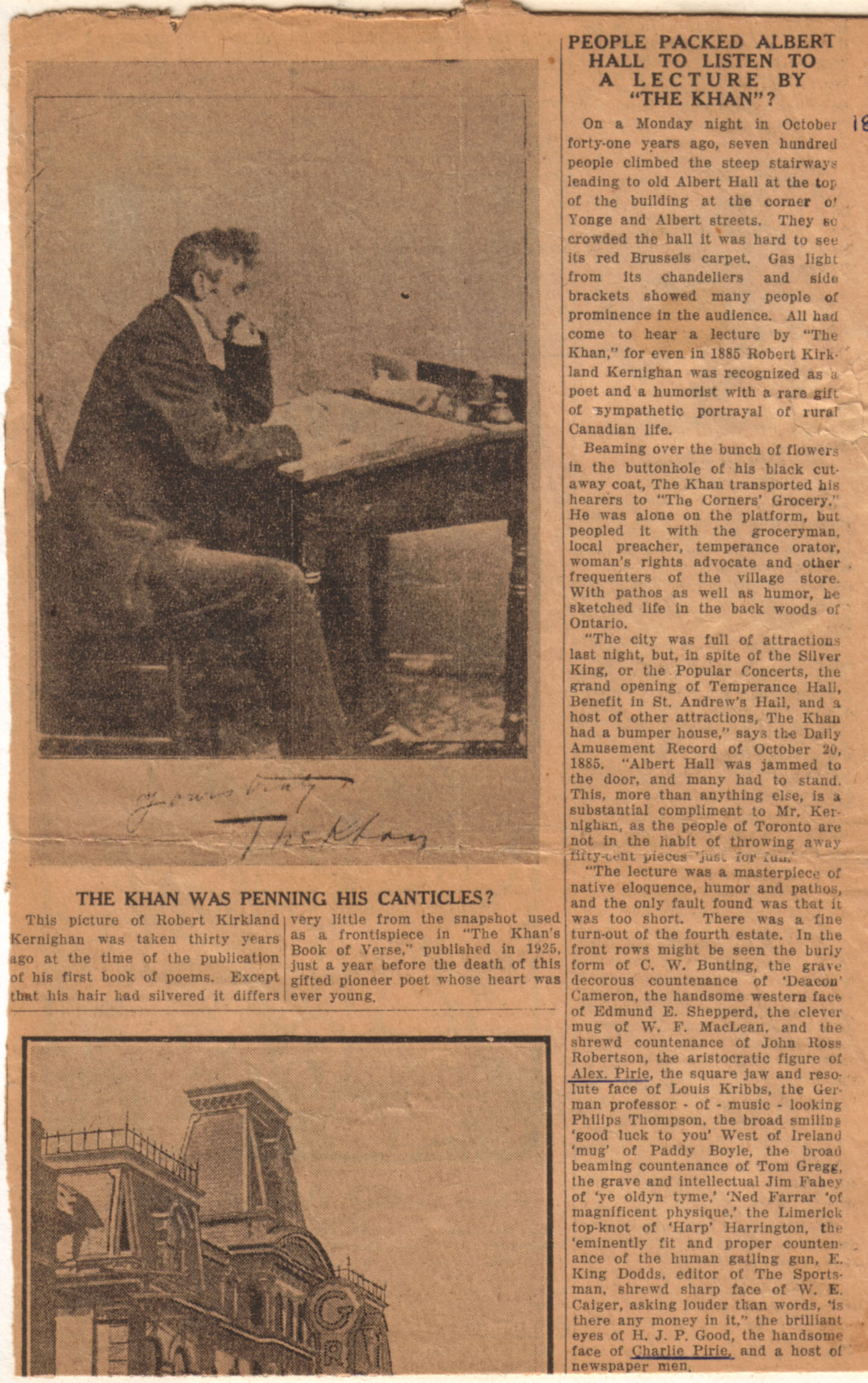
The Khan Speaks in Toronto, 1885

Robert Kirkland Kernighan (25 April 1854 – 3 November 1926) was a Canadian poet, journalist, and farmer.

== Early life and career ==
Born at Rushdale Farm, Rockton, Canada West, he apprenticed as a journalist on the Hamilton Spectator staff. About 1876, the paper printed his first poetry. Kernighan lived in Western Canada for a while working for the Winnipeg Sun. Short thereafter, he returned to Hamilton to farm. He worked exclusively for many years for the Toronto Telegram writing a column titled, "The Khan's Corner." The nickname "Khan" was given to him by a young French-Canadian woman who could not pronounce his name.

It was the opinion of Canadian Prime Minister John A. Macdonald that if Canada ever went to war the soldiers would march to battle singing Kernighan's poem "The Men of the Northern Zone".

In an article reviewing personalities from Hamilton history, Kernighan was praised as a "...poet and humourist with a rare gift of sympathetic portrayal of rural Canadian life."

The Khan appeared in Toronto at old Albert Hall on October 20, 1885 to a packed house. Toronto's Daily Amusement Record reported: "Albert Hall was jammed to the door, and many had to stand. This, more than anything else, is a substantial compliment to Mr. Kernighan, as the people of Toronto are not in the habit of throwing away fifty-cent pieces 'just for fun'." Kernighan's lecture was attended by notable local personalities who were described in the Amusement Record as the "Fourth Estate". The reviewer concluded: "The lecture was a masterpiece of native eloquence, humour and pathos, and the only fault found was that it was too short."

"The Khan's Canticles", a hardcover book containing his poetry, was published by the Hamilton Spectator Printing Company in 1896. "The Khan's Book of Verse" was published in 1925.

== Tribute ==
The Kernighan (Hamilton, Ontario) neighbourhood on the Hamilton, Ontario Mountain was named after him. It is bound by the Lincoln M. Alexander Parkway (north), Stone Church Road West (south), West 5th Street (west) and Upper James Street (east). Landmarks in this neighbourhood include Yuk Yuk's Comedy Club and Kernighan Park (Hamilton, Ontario), also named after him.
