= Rosetta Head =

Headland on the south coast of South Australia

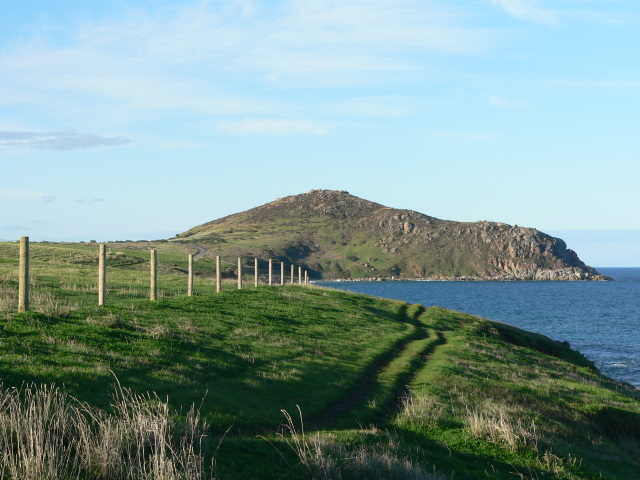
- Rosetta Head, west side

- Coordinates: 35°35′29″S 138°36′14″E
- Country: Australia
- State: South Australia
- LGA: City of Victor Harbor
- Elevation: 97 m (318 ft)
- Postcode: 5211

Rosetta Head, commonly known as The Bluff, known as Longkewar or Kongkengguwar by the Ramindjeri people, is a headland located on the south coast of Fleurieu Peninsula in the Encounter Bay, South Australia, within the local government area of the City of Victor Harbor. To its north-west is Rosetta Harbour, and to the south-east, Petrel Cove. The Bluff is a prominent landmark on the coast, about 77 kilometres (48 miles) south of the state capital of Adelaide, and used as a recreational reserve. It was formed by glaciation.

== History ==
=== Aboriginal occupation ===
Although traditional ownership of Encounter Bay has long been ascribed to the Ramindjeri clan of the Ngarrindjeri people, linguist Rob Amery of the University of Adelaide suggested in a 1998 paper that Kaurna traditional lands "may have extended as far eastward as Encounter Bay and that the occupation of Encounter Bay by the Ramindjeri in the late 1830s may have been a response to the activities of whalers in the area". He also notes that the "Encounter Bay people" mentioned in 1836 by Colonel Light and his party at Rapid Bay in 1836 spoke the Kaurna language.

The Ramindjeri people settled in the area owing to the abundance of food.

Around 2020, Aboriginal skeletal remains were found that were dated to 200 years earlier.

=== European discovery and use ===
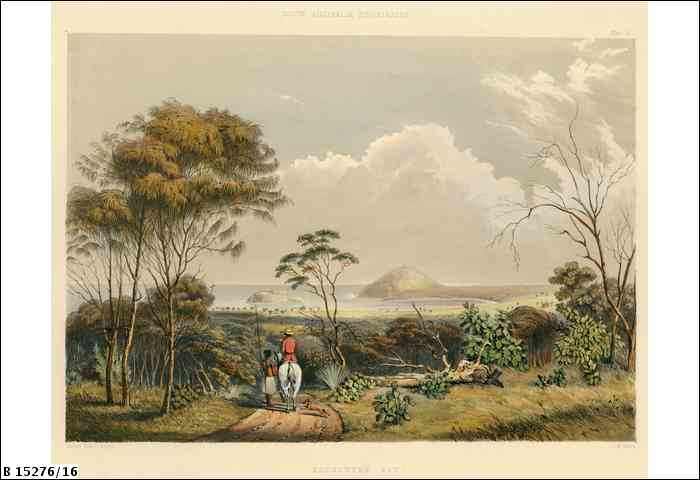
Painting by George French Angas c.1846 depicting Rosetta Head from the east

Rosetta Head was the site of a whaling station, with its peak used as a look-out point to locate whales. The station was established in 1837 and operated until the early 1860s, and was also referred to as Rosetta Harbour. Aboriginal people were employed at the station, which is now a heritage-listed site.

In December 1837 three ships ran into trouble at Rosetta Harbour, as it was referred to then: South Australian, which is the oldest known shipwreck in South Australia; Solway was wrecked, with all crew saved; and John Pirie was blown ashore in a storm while anchored, but was able to be refloated. The wharf, an adjacent sea wall and the connecting road were completed in 1856 by the Government of South Australia to assist whaling industry activity. The wharf was known as the "Lilliputian Jetty" due to its relatively small size, i.e. 12.7 metres (42 feet) wide by 4.6 metres (15 feet) deep.

The Coolanine mine was established on Rosetta Head in 1863, after some copper and gold had been found. It closed a year later, but reopened in 1882 when lead was discovered, and this was mined along with silver and tin oxide.

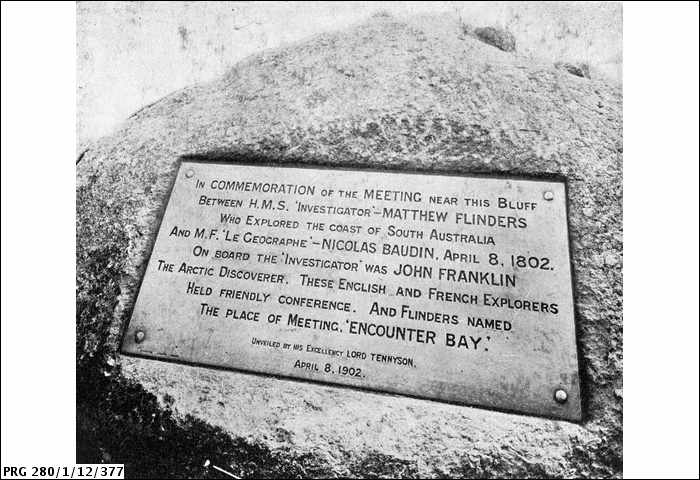
Plaque unveiled on 8 April 1902 to commemorate the meeting of Matthew Flinders and Nicolas Baudin in 1802

A tablet set into a granite boulder located near Rosetta Head's summit was unveiled on 8 April 1902 by the Governor of South Australia, The Right Honourable Hallam, Baron Tennyson to commemorate the centenary of the meeting of the European explorers, Matthew Flinders and Nicolas Baudin, in nearby waters.

In 2023 a master plan for The Bluff was published. The plan, undertaken in consultation with traditional owners and local community, is a guide to guide development on The Bluff until 2043, and takes into account social, community, cultural, environmental, and economic impacts.

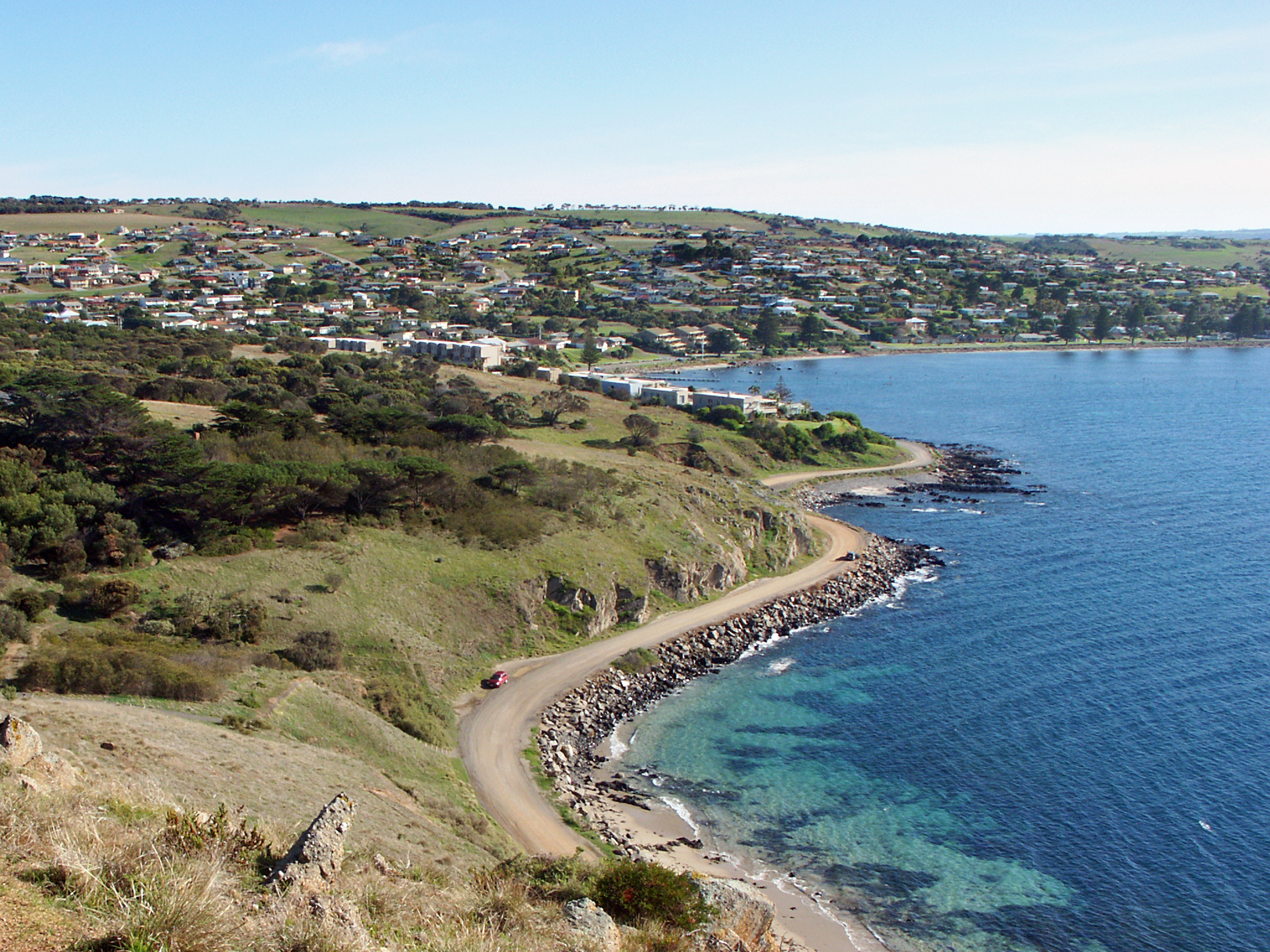
View of Victor Harbor from Rosetta Head

== Naming ==
The Bluff is known as Longkuwar/ Longkewar, or Kongkengguwar in the Ramindjeri language. The Ramindjeri name for Encounter Bay was Ramong, although some sources ascribe this name to The Bluff only.

Rosetta Head was given its modern name in 1839 after Rosetta French, the wife of George Fife Angas, reportedly by George Gawler, the second Governor of South Australia.

The use of the name "The Bluff", which is the most commonly used name for the headland, is attributed to whalers operating in the locality prior to the adoption of the name Rosetta Head.

== Description ==
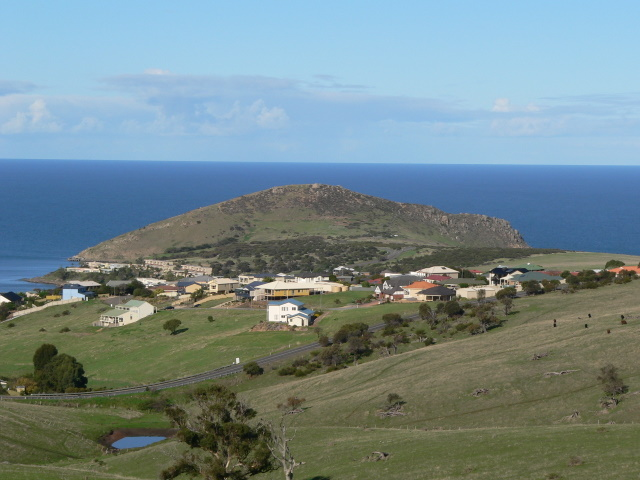
View of Rosetta Head from the north

Rosetta Head is located in the suburb of Encounter Bay about 3.9 kilometres (2.4 miles) south-west by south of the centre of Victor Harbor and about 77 kilometres (48 miles) south of Adelaide. When viewed from a platform such as a ship, it appears as being "a grassy mound, 97 metres (318 feet) high, cliffy on its E[ast] side, and covered with granite boulders; it is steep-to on its E[ast] and S[outh] sides." Its southern tip is considered by Australian authorities as being the western extent of Encounter Bay.

On its north (western) side, there is a small wharf which is connected to the adjoining urban area by a road and which adjoins a body of water is known as Rosetta Harbour to the west.

On its southern (eastern) side, there is a small cove called Petrel Cove.

== Formation, geology, and oceanography ==
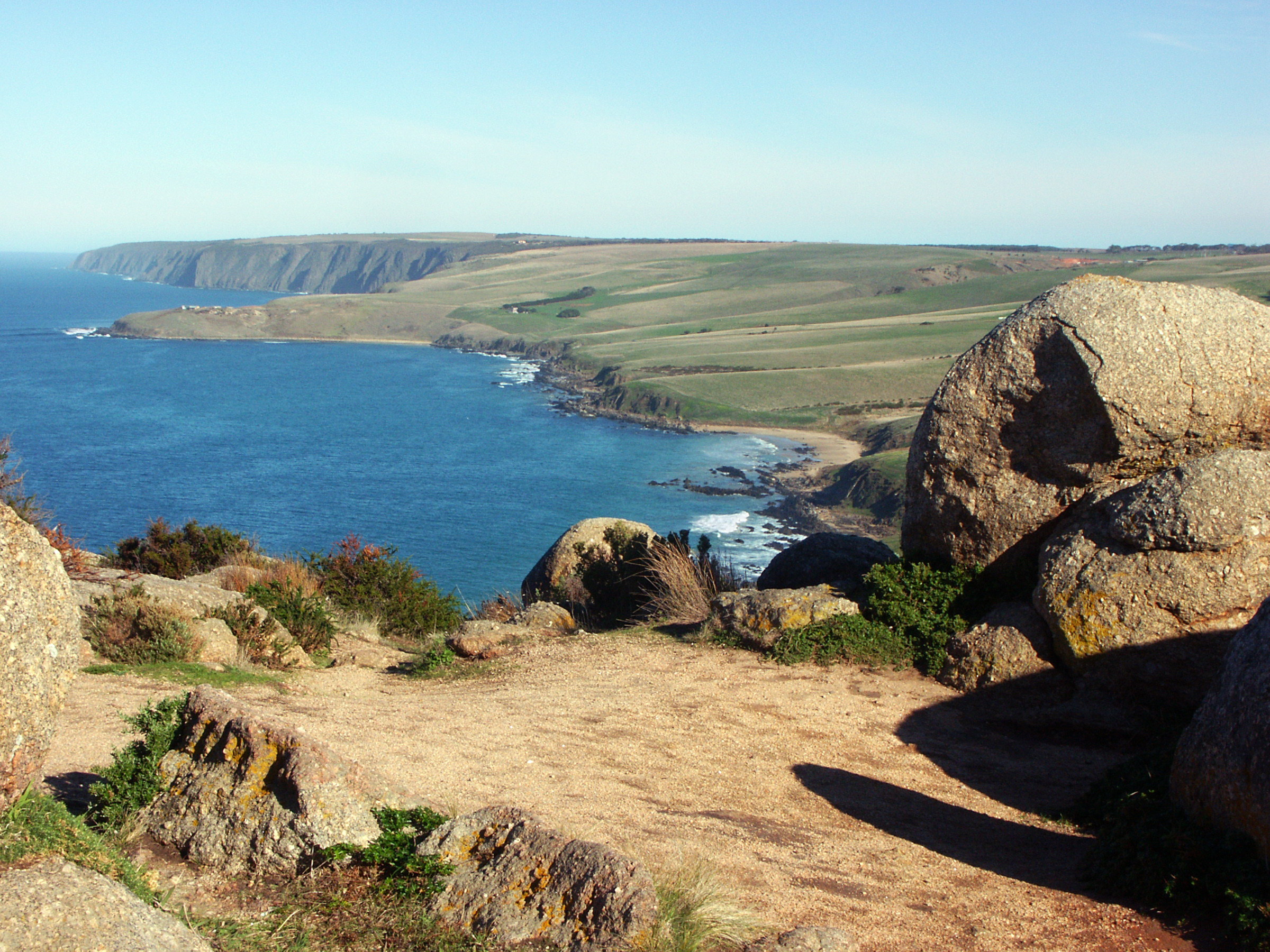
View of coastline west of Rosetta Head

Rosetta Head as a headland was formed when the sea reached its present level (97 m (318 ft) above sea level) 7,500 years ago after sea levels started to rise at the start of the Holocene. As a landform, it is a large domed inselberg which is considered to be "the most prominent feature along Encounter Bay coastline" and whose form is due to its origins via the geological processes of metamorphism and intrusion followed by two phases of erosion; firstly via the action of a northward-moving glacier during the Permian which created the distinctive dome shape and then by wave action from the south due to the sea level rise during the Holocene. When viewed from the adjoining coastline, it is considered to be a typical example of a glacial terrain known as a roche moutonnee.

Geologically, Rosetta Head is the result of the intrusion of molten granite (known as Encounter Bay Granite) into a grey metamorphic rock (known as the Kanmantoo group), which was subsequently elevated as part of a mountain-building event known as the Delamerian Orogeny between 475 and 500 million years ago.

The water adjoining the base of Rosetta Head drops to a maximum depth of 12.8 metres (42 feet) within a distance of 100 metres (330 feet) of its shore.

== Heritage listings ==
Rosetta Head was listed on the now-defunct Register of the National Estate on 21 October 1980.

It was listed on the South Australian Heritage Register on 1 September 1983.

The Rosetta Head Well and Whaling Station Site (former Encounter Bay Whaling Station) was designated as a place of archaeological significance by Victor Harbor Council, and confirmed as a State Heritage Place in the SA Heritage Register on 5 August 2021. The statement supporting its designation reads: "As one of the first examples of a shore-based whaling station operated by the South Australian Company and one of the State's earliest organised industries, the Rosetta Head Whaling Station played a significant role in the State's early economic development. In an industry where such establishments rarely lasted longer than five years, and most for considerably less time, Rosetta Head's continuous operation for 15 years was the longest of South Australia's known whaling stations". The 200-year-old Aboriginal skeletal remains discovered around 2020 further shows the significance of the site, as it may yield further evidence of interactions between the Ramindjeri people (some of whom were employed at the station) and the early whalers.

== Land use and recreation ==
Rosetta Head is used as a public recreation reserve which is managed by the City of Victor Harbor. A 600-metre (2,000 ft) walking and cycling trail ascends to the summit where views of the adjoining coastline including the Victor Harbor urban area and the nearby islands are available as well as the opportunity to observe southern right whales in the nearby waters between the months of June and October. Dogs are allowed on the trail.

The Heysen Trail starts at Petrel Cove. There is also a designated half-day hike of around 6 km (3.7 mi) from The Bluff via Petrel Cove along the Victor Harbor Heritage Trail onto Kings Beach, then past King Head

A sandy beach on the north side of Rosetta Head is notable as a site for swimming while the wharf is used for recreational fishing. A sandy beach on the south side of the head at Petrel Cove is known for its surfing and surf fishing, but is considered to be a hazardous location for swimming. The sea around Rosetta Head is a popular site for recreational diving and is notable as a place to see Leafy sea dragons.
