= John Pirie (MP) =

English politician

John Pirie of Canterbury, Kent (died 1402 or after), was an English politician.

Nothing is recorded of his family. Pirie was a Member of Parliament for Canterbury, Kent in 1401.
