= John Pirie (ship) =

Ship in the First Fleet of South Australia

History

United Kingdom of Great Britain and Ireland
- Name: John Pirie
- Owner: John Pirie before 1836; South Australian Company from 1835
- Builder: Alexander Hall and Company
- Fate: Wrecked near Furneaux Group

General characteristics
- Tons burthen: 105 tons
- Length: 62 feet 3 inches (19.0 m)
- Beam: 20 feet 1 inch (6.1 m)
- Depth of hold: 11 feet 1 inch (3.4 m)
- Sail plan: schooner
- Complement: 3 Officers; 5 crew

John Pirie was a schooner, and the smallest of the ships in the First Fleet of South Australia that carried colonists and supplies to the Colony of South Australia in 1836. It was the first ship to set sail for the South Australian Company, only three days after the Letters Patent establishing the Province of South Australia were signed. It was built by Alexander Hall and Company at Aberdeen, Scotland in 1827.

== Career ==
The ship was named after John Pirie, a London merchant who initially owned half of the shares in the ship, and later took full ownership. It initially traded between Britain and Italy, Spain and Nova Scotia.

Pirie was a founding member of the South Australian Company, and sold the John Pirie to the company before it sailed to South Australia. For the journey, it was loaded with stores, farm animals, and 21 passengers. The skipper was George Martin, with two mates and five other crew. It sailed from London on 22 February 1836, and arrived at Nepean Bay on 16 August. Another of Pirie's ships, the Emma, was chartered by the company to also make the voyage to South Australia. Martin then sailed John Pirie to Hobart Town in Van Diemen's Land to collect more supplies.

John Pirie, along with the other South Australian Company ships, remained in Australia following delivery of its passengers. It transported goods and passengers between various settlements in South Australia, as well as settlements at Launceston, Hobart Town and Sydney. It was blown ashore in a storm in December 1837 while anchored near the whaling station at Rosetta Harbour (west of Victor Harbor) in Encounter Bay, but was refloated.

John Pirie was pushed on shore in another storm on 23 September 1841 at Aldinga Bay after breaking both anchor lines. It was refloated and sailed back to Port Adelaide for repairs several weeks later. At the same time, Sydney newspapers carried advertisements that the John Pirie would be for sale in excellent order when it reached Sydney. It remained under repair until the end of January 1842, at which time it sailed to New Zealand with 16 passengers and cargo.

== Fate ==
It departed Hobart Town for Port Albert, Victoria on 25 August 1848 where it loaded cattle to return to Hobart. It was overdue reaching Hobart Town at the end of 1848. Wreckage was discovered on 3 October 1850 on the southwestern side of Prime Seal Island in the Furneaux Group in Bass Strait.

== See also ==
- List of shipwrecks of Tasmania
