= Sir John Pirie, 1st Baronet =

Australian politician

Sir John Pirie Bt

Lord Mayor of London
- In office 1841–1842

Sheriff of London
- In office 1831–1832

Personal details
- Born: 1781
- Died: 26 February 1851 (aged 69–70) Champion Hill, Camberwell, London
- Resting place: West Norwood Cemetery
- Children: none
- Occupation: Shipbroker
- Known for: Financing establishment of South Australia

Sir John Pirie, 1st Baronet (1781 – 26 February 1851), was a British shipbroker and Lord Mayor of London. He was the largest shipbroker in London.

In the 1830s he started to uphold Wakefield's principles and became a founding director, and one of the largest financiers, of the South Australian Company. He was also a director of the New Zealand Company, and the East India Company.

One of the first three ships despatched in 1836 to found the new colony of South Australia was the 105-ton two-masted schooner named John Pirie.

Pirie was elected Sheriff of London for 1831–32 and Lord Mayor for 1841–42. He was created a baronet, of Camberwell in the County of Surrey, in 1842 on his retirement as Lord Mayor.

Pirie had no children and died at Champion Hill, Camberwell on 26 February 1851. Although he was a past director of City of London and Tower Hamlets Cemetery Co, he was buried at West Norwood Cemetery. The title died with him.

Pirie Street in Adelaide and the city of Port Pirie were also named after him.

Civic offices
Preceded by Thomas Johnson	Lord Mayor of London; 1841–1842	Succeeded by John Humphery
Baronetage of the United Kingdom
New creation	Baronet (of Camberwell); 1842–1851	Extinct
