= Owen railway station =

Former railway station in South Australia, Australia

Owen

General information
- Location: Railway Terrace, Owen, South Australia
- Coordinates: 34.26955906519865°S 138.54830217979662°E
- Owner: Aurizon
- Operator: Australian National
- Line: Hamley Bridge-Gladstone railway line
- Distance: 93.8 kilometres from Adelaide
- Platforms: 2
- Tracks: 1

Construction
- Structure type: Ground

Other information
- Status: Closed and demolished

History
- Opened: 15 January 1880
- Closed: 1982 (passengers); 2005 (freight)

Services
Preceding station	Aurizon	Following station
Stockyard Creek towards Adelaide	Gladstone railway line	Hoskin Corner towards Gladstone
Location

Owen railway station was located on the Hamley Bridge-Gladstone railway line. It served the rural community of Owen, South Australia.

== History ==
Owen railway station opened on 15 January 1880 when the narrow gauge railway line opened from Hamley Bridge to Balaklava (later extended to Blyth and Gladstone) by 1894). The station was named after John Owen, the person who possessed the land in the locality. When the station first opened, it only consisted of a platform and a siding but improvements like a new station building with a station master appointed and a goods platform with a crane were added.

On 1 August 1927, the line through Owen was gauge converted to 5 ft 3 in (1,600 mm).

Barley silos were built in the 1960s, and the later one doubled the storage space.

In 1978, the station and all associated infrastructure was included in the transfer of South Australian Railways to Australian National. The Bluebird railcar service to Gladstone ceased by 1982. The station was most likely demolished sometime after leaving only the railway yards, silos and the siding. In 1997, the railway line and yards were included in the transfer of Australian National's freight assets to Australian Southern Railroad (later known as One Rail Australia.) Grain trains last used the silos at Owen in 2005. The railway line and yards were included in Aurizon's purchase of One Rail Australia in 2022.
