= Saddleworth railway station, South Australia =

Former railway station in South Australia, Australia

Saddleworth

General information
- Coordinates: 34.08741418879942°S 138.78270604728928°E
- System: Former Australian National regional rail
- Operator: Australian National
- Line: Roseworthy-Peterborough line
- Distance: 112 kilometres from Adelaide
- Platforms: 1
- Tracks: 1

Construction
- Structure type: Ground

Other information
- Status: Closed and demolished

History
- Opened: 1870
- Closed: December 1986

Services
Preceding station	Aurizon	Following station
Riverton towards Adelaide	Roseworthy-Peterborough railway line	Manoora towards Peterborough
Location

Saddleworth railway station was located on the Roseworthy-Peterborough railway line. It served the town of Saddleworth, South Australia.

== History ==
=== Opening ===
The first stage of the broad gauge Burra line from a junction at Roseworthy to Forresters (now Tarlee) opened on 3 July 1869. It extended to Manoora on 21 February 1870, Burra on 29 August 1870, Hallett on 10 March 1878 and Terowie on 14 December 1880. Terowie was a break of gauge station with the line continuing north to Peterborough as a narrow gauge line, opening on 11 May 1881. The current Saddleworth railway station was built in 1897–98. It was identical to other stations along the line like Merildin, consisting of a station building and a hammered veranda edgingIt also consisted of a railway siding and a station master's garden.

== Closure and demolition ==
In 1978, the station and all associated infrastructure was included in the transfer of South Australian Railways to Australian National. The station closed for regular passenger use on 13 December 1986, but some special train tours used the station afterwards. The last passenger train, a SteamRanger tour hauled by former SAR steam locomotive 621 and recently acquired diesel locomotive 958 used the station on 19 September 1992. In 1997, the station and railway line were included in the transfer of Australian National's South Australian freight assets to Australian Southern Railroad (later known as One Rail Australia.) Grain trains last used the silos at Saddleworth in October 2005. The station remnants and railway line were included in Aurizon's purchase of One Rail Australia in 2022. The station has since been demolished.

== Proposed connections ==
A railway from Clare to Saddleworth was proposed in 1875 but it was rejected for various reasons. Another railway was proposed to branch off from the Morgan line at Kapunda but it was also rejected.
