= Stockyard Creek railway station =

Former railway station in South Australia, Australia

Stockyard Creek
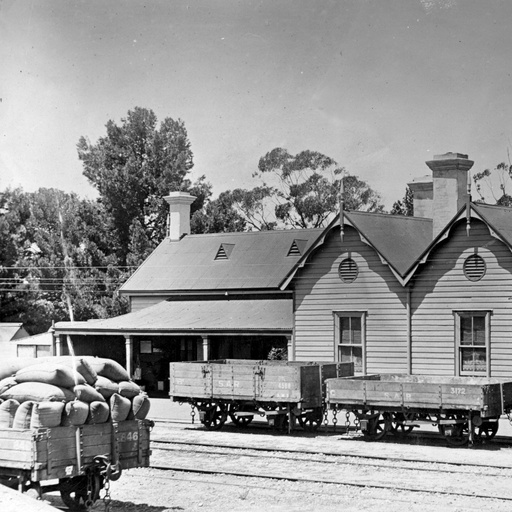
- Railway Station at Stockyard Creek (circa 1915)

General information
- Location: Barabba Road, Stockyard Creek, South Australia
- Coordinates: 34.29997925804535°S 138.5848988335971°E
- Owner: Aurizon
- Operator: Australian National
- Line: Hamley Bridge-Gladstone railway line
- Distance: 78.6 kilometres from Adelaide
- Platforms: 2
- Tracks: 1

Construction
- Structure type: Ground

Other information
- Status: Closed, mostly demolished

History
- Opened: 15 January 1880
- Closed: 1982 (passengers); 2005 (freight)

Services
Preceding station	Aurizon	Following station
Hamley Bridge towards Adelaide	Gladstone railway line	Owen towards Gladstone
Location

Stockyard Creek railway station was located on the Hamley Bridge-Gladstone railway line. It served the locality of Stockyard Creek, South Australia.

== History ==
On 15 January 1880, the railway line was built from Hamley Bridge north towards Balaklava (later extended to Blyth and Gladstone) by 1894). As part of this line, a railway station, goods shed and a siding accommodation was provided. The site where the station was built was formerly used as a stockyard by C.B Fisher hence the station was named Stockyard Creek. On 1 August 1927, the line through Stockyard Creek was gauge converted to 5 ft 3 in (1,600 mm).

In 1978, the station and all associated infrastructure was included in the transfer of South Australian Railways to Australian National. The Bluebird railcar service to Gladstone ceased by 1982. In 1997, the railway line and yards were included in the transfer of Australian National's freight assets to Australian Southern Railroad (later known as One Rail Australia.) Grain trains last used the line through Stockyard Creek in 2005. The railway line and yards were included in Aurizon's purchase of One Rail Australia in 2022.

As of 2024, the platform is the only evidence of the station remaining with the building, siding and goods shed being removed on an unknown date sometime before.
