= Ulooloo railway station =

Former railway station in South Australia

Ulooloo

General information
- Operator: South Australian Railways
- Line: Roseworthy-Peterborough line
- Platforms: 1

Construction
- Structure type: Ground

Other information
- Status: Demolished

History
- Opened: 1880
- Closed: December 1986

Services
Preceding station	Australian National Railways Commission	Following station
Hallett towards Adelaide	Roseworthy-Peterborough railway line	Whyte Yarcowie towards Peterborough

Ulooloo railway station was located on the Roseworthy-Peterborough railway line in the locality of Ulooloo, South Australia.

== History ==
Ulooloo railway station opened in 1880 when the broad gauge line from Adelaide to Peterborough was completed. Ulooloo consisted of a railway siding and a wooden railway station building. The line through Ulooloo was closed on 26 July 1988; there is no longer any trace of the station.
