= Roseworthy–Peterborough railway line =

Former railway line in South Australia

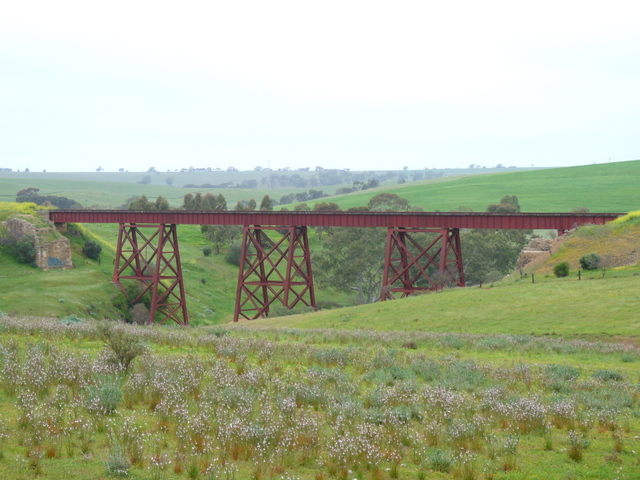
- Bridge over the Light River at Hamley Bridge (2010)

Overview
- Status: Partially closed and removed, remaining section dormant
- Locale: Mid North
- Termini: Roseworthy; Peterborough
- Continues from: Morgan line
- Continues as: Peterborough-Quorn line

Service
- System: South Australian Railways
- Operator(s): South Australian Railways; Australian National Australian Southern Railroad

History
- Opened: Roseworthy-Forresters: 3 July 1869; Forresters-Manoora: 21 February 1870; Manoora-Burra: 29 August 1870; Burra-Hallett: 10 March 1878; Hallett-Terowie: 14 December 1880; Terowie-Peterborough: 11 May 1881
- Closed: Hallett-Peterborough: 26 July 1988; Burra-Hallett: 14 November 1990; Saddleworth-Burra: 12 March 2004; Roseworthy-Saddleworth: 31 October 2005; Gawler-Roseworthy: 11 October 2007

Technical
- Line length: 199.1 km (123.7 mi)
- Track gauge: 1,600 mm (5 ft 3 in)
- Old gauge: 1,067 mm (3 ft 6 in) north of Terowie until 1970

The Roseworthy–Peterborough railway line is a closed railway line in South Australia. It was first opened from a junction at Roseworthy on the Morgan railway line through Hamley Bridge, Riverton, initially to Tarlee, then extended in stages to Peterborough. The line was closed in sections in the 1980s with the final section from Gawler to Roseworthy being used in 2007.

== History ==
=== Proposal and Opening ===
The Burra Burra railway was initially proposed as early as 1850, before any other railways north from Port Adelaide. Before anything was done about this, the Gawler railway line was built in 1857, and extended to Kapunda in 1860 (and eventually to Morgan in 1878, see Morgan railway line). The first stage of the broad gauge Burra line from a junction at Roseworthy to Forresters (now Tarlee) opened on 3 July 1869. It extended to Manoora on 21 February 1870, Burra on 29 August 1870, Hallett on 10 March 1878 and Terowie on 14 December 1880. Terowie was a break of gauge station with the line continuing north to Peterborough as a narrow gauge line, opening on 11 May 1881.

=== Full conversion to broad gauge and transfer to Australian National ===
On 12 January 1970, the 22.9-kilometre Terowie-Peterborough section was converted to broad gauge, thus making Peterborough the break of gauge point with the narrow gauge Peterborough to Quorn and standard gauge Port Pirie to Broken Hill lines. In March 1978, the line was included in the transfer of the South Australian Railways to Australian National.

=== Partial closure and removal ===
Regular Australian National passenger services ceased in December 1986, with the line north of Hallett closed on 26 July 1988, followed by the Burra to Hallett section on 14 November 1990. The line north of Burra was removed in 1992/93. The last passenger train to operate the full line to Peterborough was a Steamrail Victoria tour using Victorian locomotive R761. The last passenger train to use the remaining line to Burra was a SteamRanger tour hauled by former SAR steam locomotive 621 and recently acquired diesel locomotive 958 on 19 September 1992. 958 was used to lead the train back to Adelaide as the turntable at Burra was too small to turn 621.

=== Private ownership and full closure ===
On 1 November 1997, Australian Southern Railroad acquired a 50-year lease on the rail corridor and total ownership of the rail infrastructure as part of Australian National's South Australian freight assets sale to ASR. Grain services to Burra last operated in January 1999, with the line from Saddleworth to Burra last used by an Australian Railroad Group (formerly ASR) locomotive on 12 March 2004. In the same month, the last passenger train operated on the line, a Friends of Belair Railway Station charter to Riverton using 3000 class railcars. The last grain train to Saddleworth was operated on 31 October 2005, and the last grain train on the line was operated by Roseworthy by Genesee and Wyoming Australia (formerly ARG) on 2 February 2007. Stored hoppers were collected on 11 October 2007, marking the last use of the line. The lease of the land and ownership of the rail infrastructure passed to Aurizon in 2022, following their purchase of One Rail Australia (the final successor of Australian Southern Railroad).

=== Present day ===
Aurizon does not list the line as being open or in use, but it is available for access. The line has fallen into disrepair, being damaged by floods and bushfires. The line has been severed at several points for drainage and road surface improvements. Between 2014 and 2022, the line was blocked off from the Gawler line, and the wider Adelaide metropolitan network after a fence was installed at the Gawler River bridge.

== Line Guide ==
(Note: dates are those that are indicated in each individual article)

Station	Image	Opened	Additional information
Peterborough		1880	Terminus 1880–1986
Terowie		1880	Break of gauge 1880-1970; closed December 1986
Whyte Yarcowie		?	?
Ulooloo	?	?	Closed 1940
Hallett		?	Closed December 1986
Mount Bryan		?	Closed December 1986
Burra		1870	Terminus until 1880, Closed December 1986
Hanson		?	?
Farrell Flat		1899	Closed December 1986
Mintaro		1870	Closed December 1986
Manoora		?	Closed December 1986
Saddleworth		1870	Closed December 1986
Riverton		1870	Junction with the Spalding line, closed December 1986
Tarlee			Closed December 1986
Stockport		?	Closed December 1986
Hamley Bridge		1869	Junction with the Gladstone line, break of gauge until 1927, Closed December 1986
Wasleys		1869	Closed December 1986
Roseworthy		1860	Junction with the Morgan line, Closed December 1986
See Gawler railway line for intermediate stations between Gawler and Adelaide Station
Adelaide railway station		1856	
