= Mount Bryan railway station =

Former railway station in South Australia, Australia

Mount Bryan

General information
- Location: Railway Terrace, Mount Bryan, South Australia
- Coordinates: 33.55000973817814°S 138.89285465274065°E
- Operator: Australian National
- Line: Roseworthy-Peterborough line
- Distance: 178 kilometres from Adelaide
- Platforms: 1
- Tracks: 1

Construction
- Structure type: Ground

Other information
- Status: Closed

History
- Opened: 1880
- Closed: December 1986

Services
| Preceding station | Australian National Railways Commission | Following station |
|---|---|---|
| Burra towards Adelaide | Roseworthy-Peterborough railway line | Hallett towards Peterborough |
Location

Mount Bryan railway station was located on the Roseworthy-Peterborough railway line. It served the town of Mount Bryan.

== History ==
Mount Bryan railway station opened in 1880. By that time, the Burra Burra railway had been extended to Terowie. The line was later extended further to Peterborough on 11 May 1881.

The station consisted of a station master's office, goods shed, a cloakroom, cattle and sheep yards, cream and egg shed and wheat stack yard. About 44 trains per week rolled to a halt.

In 1978, the station and all associated infrastructure was included in the transfer of South Australian Railways to Australian National. The station closed for regular passenger use on 13 December 1986. The last passenger train, a Steamrail Victoria tour using Victorian locomotive R761 used the station on 6 June 1987. The line through Mount Bryan was taken up in 1992/93.

The unused platform, the goods crane and the station sign are all that remain of the station today.
