= Merildin railway station =

Former railway station in South Australia, Australia

Merildin
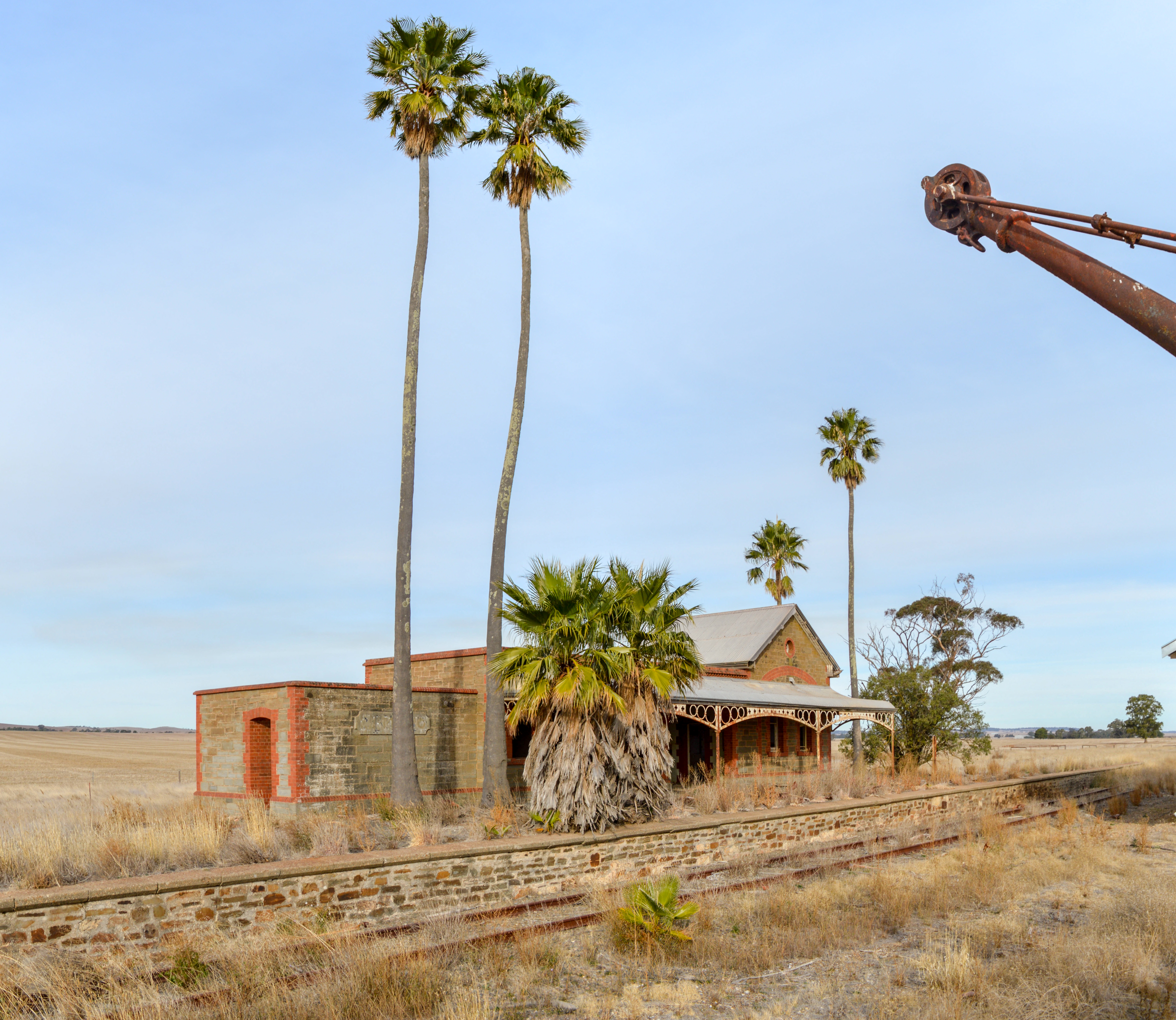
- Merildin railway station (2021)

General information
- Location: Bowmans Road, Mintaro, South Australia
- Coordinates: 33.90460777766914°S 138.78761347212622°E
- System: Former Australian National regional rail
- Operator: Australian National
- Line: Roseworthy-Peterborough line
- Distance: 134 kilometres from Adelaide
- Platforms: 1
- Tracks: 1

Construction
- Structure type: Ground

Other information
- Status: Closed

History
- Opened: 29 August 1870
- Closed: December 1986

Services
Preceding station	Aurizon	Following station
Manoora towards Adelaide	Roseworthy-Peterborough railway line	Farrell Flat towards Peterborough
Location

Merildin railway station was located on the Roseworthy-Peterborough railway line in the South Australian town of Mintaro.

== History ==
=== Opening ===
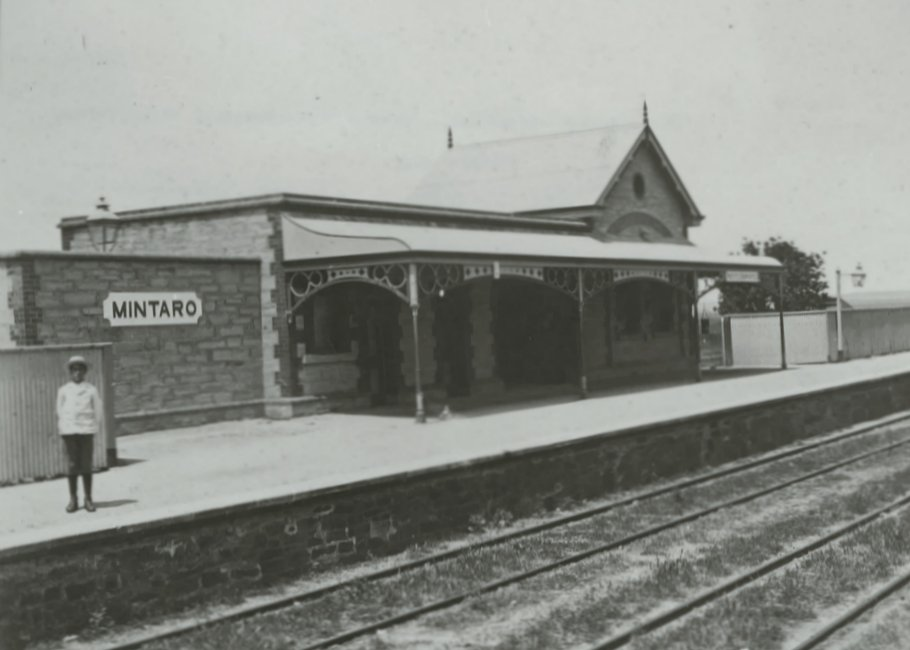
The railway station servicing Mintaro in 1901

Merildin railway station opened on 29 August 1870 when the broad gauge railway line was extended from Manoora to Burra. The original goods shed was erected in 1873 and the station building was erected in 1899 with a hammered veranda edging similar to the ones at Manoora, Saddleworth, Farrell Flat and other stations along the line. It also consisted of a railway siding and a station master's garden. The station siding was originally named after the town of Mintaro but the name was changed to Merildin in 1917 and the station itself was located quite some distance from the town.

=== Transfer to Australian National and closure ===
In 1978, the station and all associated infrastructure was included in the transfer of South Australian Railways to Australian National. On 12 January 1984, the station and yards were heritage listed. The station closed to regular passenger use in December 1986 but some special train tours used the station afterwards. The last passenger train to use the station was a SteamRanger tour to Burra hauled by former SAR steam locomotive 621 and recently acquired diesel locomotive 958 on 19 September 1992. In 1997, the station and railway line were included in the transfer of Australian National's South Australian freight assets to Australian Southern Railroad (later known as One Rail Australia.) Grain trains last used the line to Burra in March 2004. The station remnants and railway line were included in Aurizon's purchase of One Rail Australia in 2022.

=== Present day ===
The station has now fallen into a state of neglect and disrepair. It is now privately owned.
