= Wasleys railway station =

Former railway station in South Australia, Australia

Wasleys

General information
- Coordinates: 34.47175665660969°S 138.68299927851686°E
- System: Former Australian National regional rail
- Operator: Australian National
- Line: Roseworthy-Peterborough line
- Distance: 66.9 kilometres from Adelaide
- Platforms: 1
- Tracks: 1

Construction
- Structure type: Ground

Other information
- Status: Closed, mostly demolished

History
- Opened: 1869
- Closed: 31 December 1986

Services
Preceding station	Aurizon	Following station
Roseworthy towards Adelaide	Roseworthy-Peterborough railway line	Hamley Bridge towards Peterborough
Location

Wasleys railway station was located on the Roseworthy-Peterborough railway line in Australia. It served the town of Wasleys.

== History ==
Wasleys railway station opened along the first stage of the broad gauge Burra line from a junction at Roseworthy to Forresters (now Tarlee) opened on 3 July 1869. The station was erected on the land purchased by Joseph Wasley, one of the first settlers to the area. The station itself was also named after Joseph Wasley.

On 12 April 1970, a South Australian Railways Bluebird railcar bound for Gladstone and a double-decker bus carrying families from the Adelaide Gothic Hotel social club returning from a picnic at Wasleys, collided at a level crossing on the main road between Gawler and Wasleys (the present day Redbanks Road), killing 17 people and injured more than 40 others.

In 1978, the station and all associated infrastructure was included in the transfer of South Australian Railways to Australian National. The station closed for regular passenger use on 13 December 1986, but some special tours used the station up until 2004.

In 1997, the station and railway line were included in the transfer of Australian National's South Australian freight assets to Australian Southern Railroad (later known as One Rail Australia.) Most of the station infrastructure including the station building, goods shed, and the siding were demolished, except for the passenger platform.

The line through Wasleys was last used by a grain train in October 2005, and has since suffered damage during the 2015 Pinery Bushfire.
