= Manoora railway station =

Former railway station in South Australia, Australia

Manoora
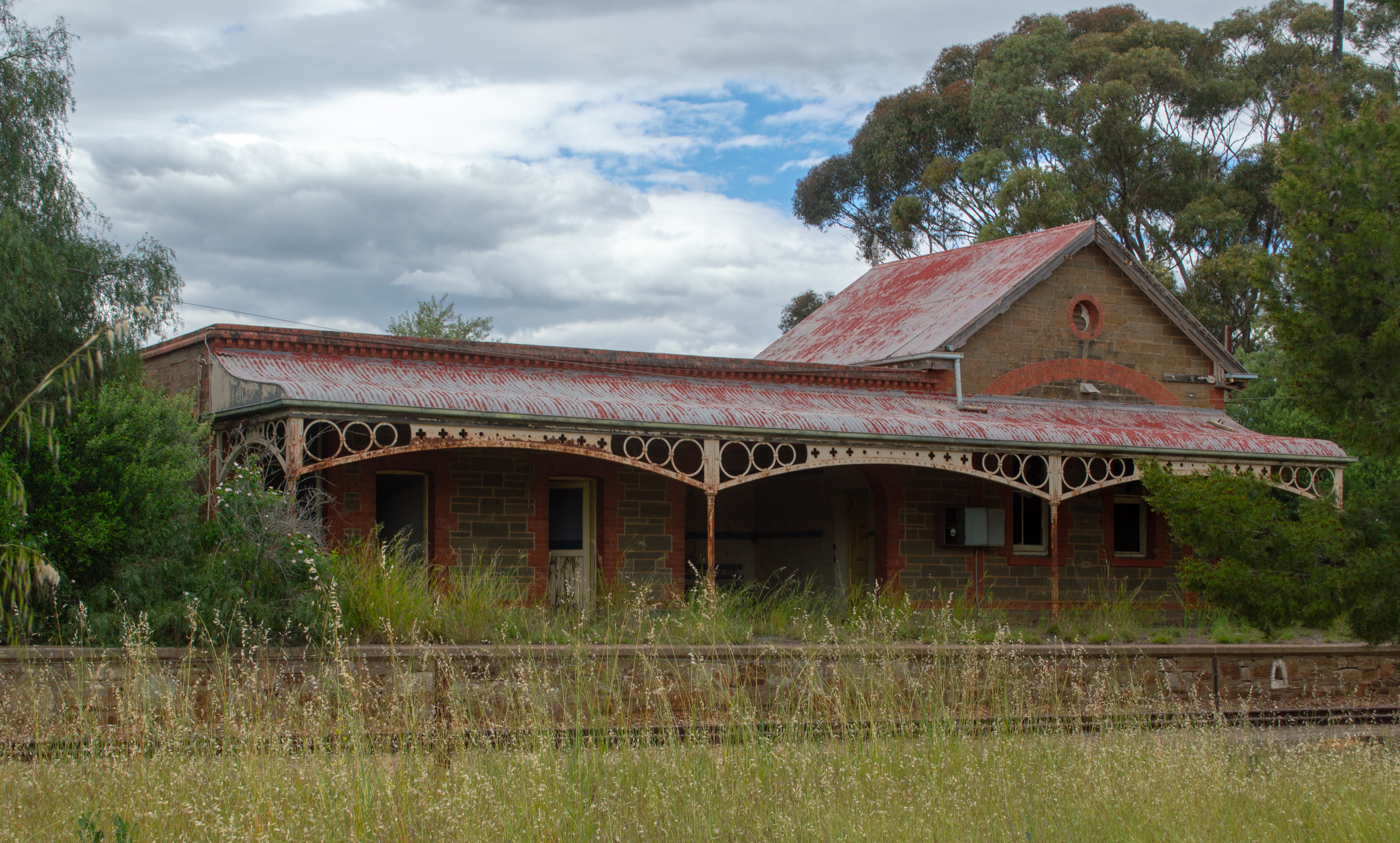
- Manoora railway station (2020)

General information
- Location: John Street, Manoora, South Australia
- Coordinates: 33.99937448848592°S 138.81932562149586°E
- System: Former Australian National regional rail
- Operator: Australian National
- Line: Roseworthy-Peterborough line
- Distance: 121 kilometres from Adelaide
- Platforms: 1
- Tracks: 1

Construction
- Structure type: Ground

Other information
- Status: Closed

History
- Opened: 1898
- Closed: December 1986

Services
Preceding station	Aurizon	Following station
Saddleworth towards Adelaide	Roseworthy-Peterborough railway line	Merildin towards Peterborough
Location

Manoora railway station was located on the Roseworthy-Peterborough railway line. It served the settlement of Manoora, South Australia.

== History ==
=== Opening ===
The first stage of the broad gauge Burra line from a junction at Roseworthy to Forresters (now Tarlee) opened on 3 July 1869. It extended to Manoora on 21 February 1870, Burra on 29 August 1870, Hallett on 10 March 1878 and Terowie on 14 December 1880. Terowie was a break of gauge station with the line continuing north to Peterborough as a narrow gauge line, opening on 11 May 1881. Manoora railway station was built in 1898. It was built of locally quarried stone and was identical to stations at Merildin, Saddleworth, Tarlee and Farrell Flat on the line.

=== Closure ===
In 1978, the station and all associated infrastructure was included in the transfer of South Australian Railways to Australian National. The station was heritage listed on 12 January 1984. The station closed for regular passenger use on 13 December 1986, but some special train tours used the station afterwards. The last passenger train, a SteamRanger tour hauled by former SAR steam locomotive 621 and recently acquired diesel locomotive 958 used the station on 19 September 1992. In 1997, the station and railway line were included in the transfer of Australian National's South Australian freight assets to Australian Southern Railroad (later known as One Rail Australia.) Grain trains last used the line through Manoora in March 2004. The station remnants and railway line were included in Aurizon's purchase of One Rail Australia in 2022.

=== Present day ===
The station, yard, including the goods shed, water tower and crane remain but the precinct has now fallen into a state of neglect and disrepair.
