= Roseworthy railway station =

Former railway station in Roseworthy, South Australia

Roseworthy
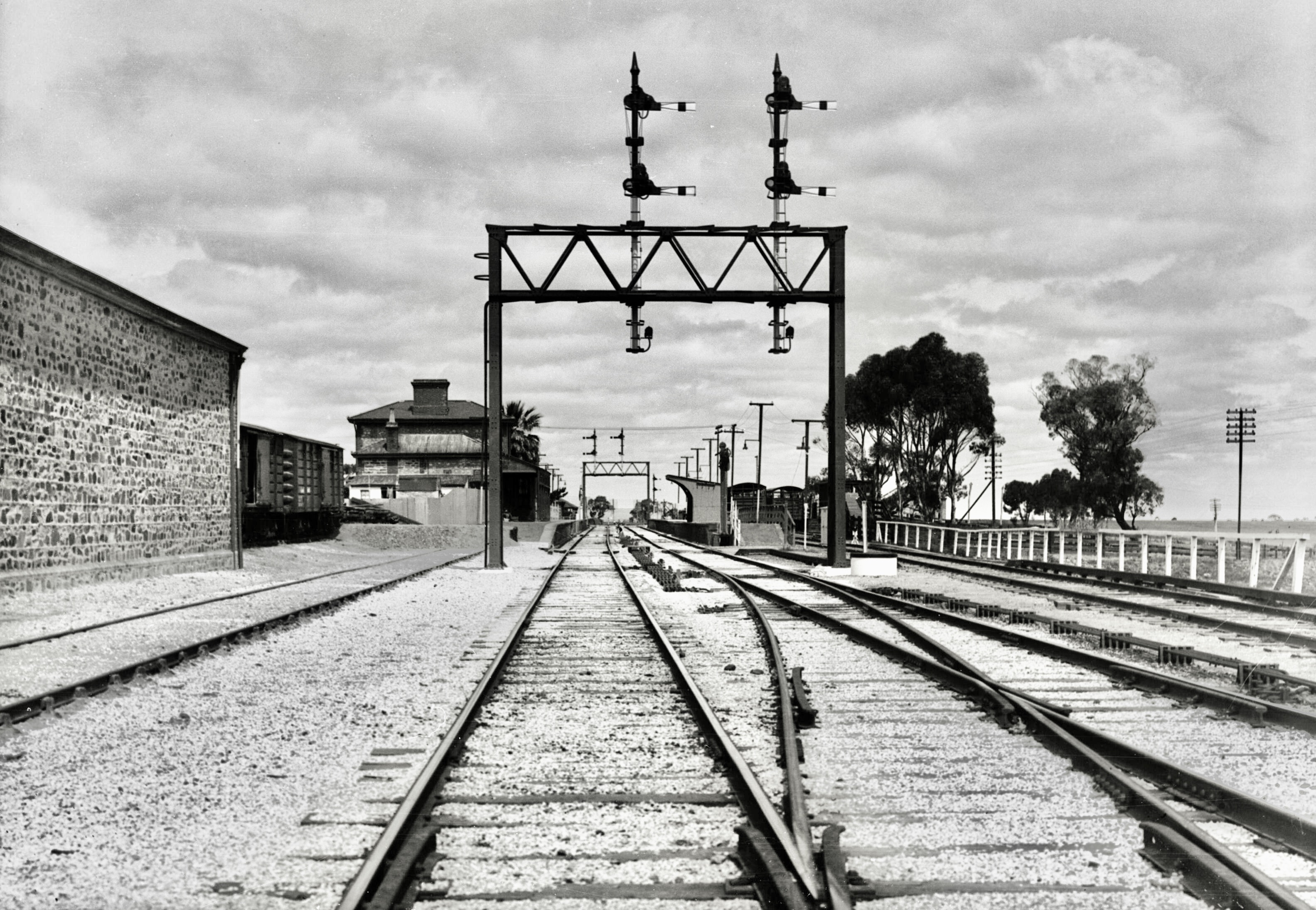
- The Roseworthy railway station yard, looking south towards Adelaide in 1929.

General information
- Location: Railway Terrace, Roseworthy, South Australia
- Coordinates: 34°31′59″S 138°44′47″E
- Elevation: 111 m (364 ft)
- System: Former Australian National regional rail
- Owner: South Australian Railways 1860 - 1978 Australian National 1978 - 1997 One Rail Australia 1997-2022 Aurizon 2022-present
- Operator: South Australian Railways 1860 - 1978 Australian National 1978 - 1986
- Line: Roseworthy-Peterborough line
- Distance: 49 kilometres from Adelaide
- Platforms: 2
- Tracks: 2

Construction
- Structure type: Ground

Other information
- Status: Closed, mostly demolished

History
- Opened: 13 August 1860
- Closed: December 1986

Services
Preceding station	Aurizon	Following station
Gawler towards Adelaide	Roseworthy-Peterborough railway line	Wasleys towards Peterborough
Preceding station	Aurizon	Following station
Gawler towards Adelaide	Morgan railway line	Freeling towards Morgan
Location

Roseworthy railway station was located at the junction of the Morgan railway line and the Roseworthy-Peterborough railway line. Situated in the town of Roseworthy, South Australia, it was located 49 kilometres from Adelaide by rail.

== History ==
=== Opening ===
Roseworthy railway station opened on 13 August 1860 as part of the extension of what was then known as the Northern Railway to Kapunda. The station was built on land within the Hundred of Mudla Wirra that was purchased by landowners William and Grace Gartrell. The station facilities included a two-storey stone station building and a stone goods shed. The design of the original station building was similar to the buildings that once existed at Dry Creek and Salisbury. The station became a junction station on 3 July 1869, with the opening of the railway line to Forresters (Now Tarlee.) The railway to Kapunda reached Morgan on 23 September 1878, providing a connection to the Murray River. The railway to Tarlee reached the Crystal Brook-Broken Hill railway line at Petersburg (now Peterborough) on 11 May 1881. The passenger platforms were extended in 1913 to allow for longer trains to stop at the station. In approximately the 1950s-1960s, the original 1860 two-storey station building was replaced with a single-storey building. In 1960, grain silos were provided at the station yard, allowing goods trains to load wheat from the area for export.

=== Closure and demolition ===
In 1978, the station and all associated infrastructure was included in the transfer of South Australian Railways to Australian National. The station closed for regular passenger use on 13 December 1986, but some special tours used the station up until 2004. In 1997, the station and railway line were included in the transfer of Australian National's South Australian freight assets to Australian Southern Railroad (later known as One Rail Australia.) The last light engine movement ran to Kapunda in May 2003. During May–June 2005, most station infrastructure, including the station building, water tower, and east-side platform were demolished. The last grain trains ran beyond Roseworthy in October 2005. Grain trains last used the silos at Roseworthy on 2 February 2007, and the remaining stored hoppers were collected on 11 October 2007. The station remnants and railway line were included in Aurizon's purchase of One Rail Australia in 2022.

=== Present Day ===
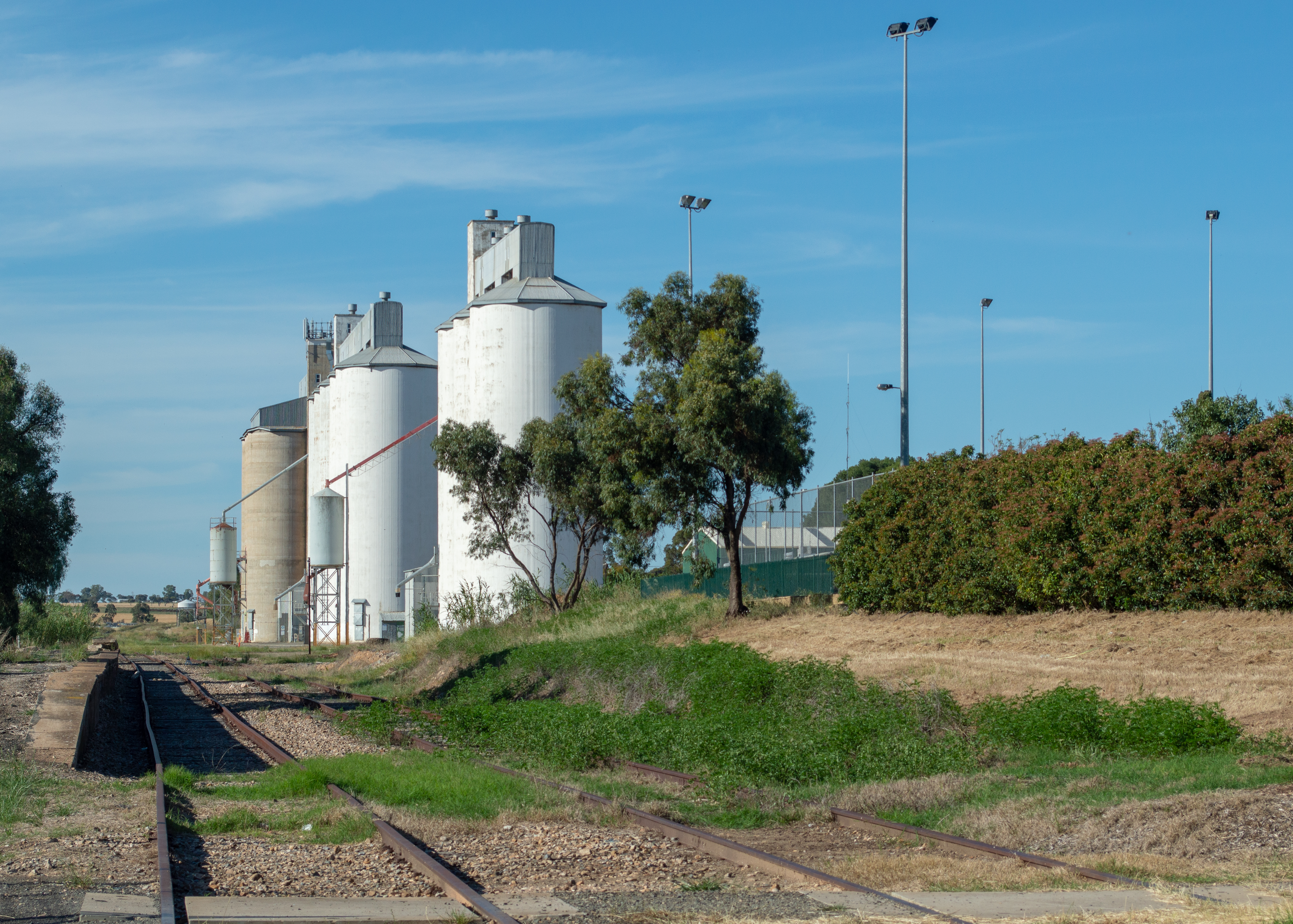
The east-side passenger platform, railway tracks and grain silos in 2012

Only the west-side platform, the railway tracks, and grain silos remain. The grain silos are still serviced by trucks, which use a gravel driveway constructed on the railway tracks. The goods crane has been moved to a park adjacent the former east-side platform, while the water column for steam locomotives was moved to the nearby primary school, displayed next to a semaphore signal similar to those used on the railway line.
