= Blue wren =

Blue wren is:

a colloquial name used to refer to several species of fairywren

- Superb fairywren, found in south-eastern Australia
- Splendid fairywren, found in central and south-western Australia

a Code Name

- Ana Montes, American, convicted Cuban spy
