= Burra railway station =

Former railway station in Burra, South Australia

Coordinates: 33.6742°S 138.9196°E

Burra
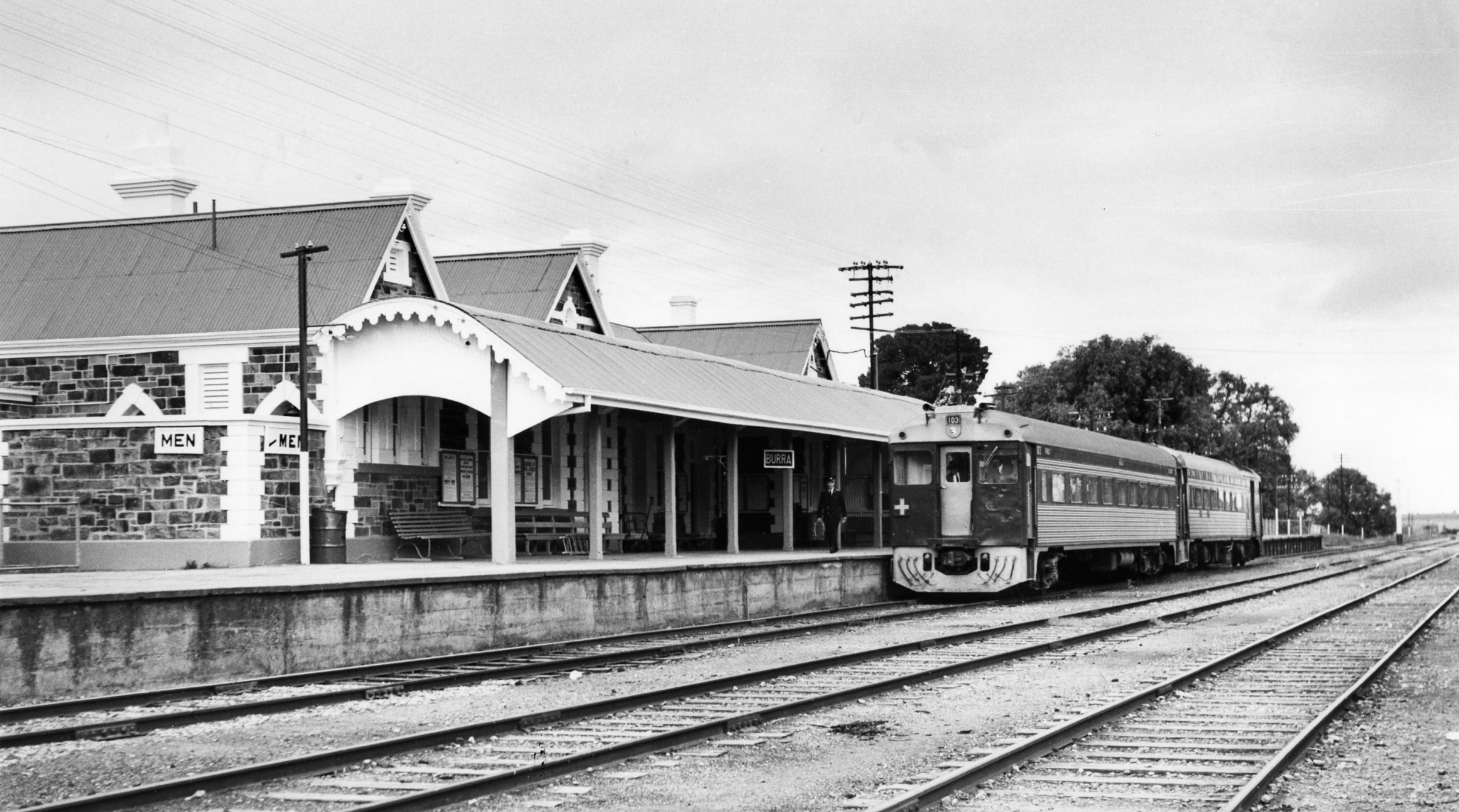
- Burra railway station in 1969, when Bluebird railcars provided a comfortable passenger service

General information
- Location: Railway Terrace, Burra, South Australia
- Elevation: 474 metres (1555 feet)
- Owner: South Australian Railways 1860–1978; Australian National 1978–1997
- Line: Roseworthy–Peterborough line
- Distance: 164 kilometres from Adelaide railway station
- Platforms: 2
- Tracks: 2

Construction
- Structure type: Ground

Other information
- Status: Closed

History
- Opened: 29 August 1870
- Closed: December 1986
- Rebuilt: 2016 (station building)

Services
Preceding station	Aurizon	Following station
Hanson towards Adelaide	Roseworthy-Peterborough railway line	Mount Bryan towards Peterborough
Location

Burra railway station was built on the Roseworthy-Peterborough railway line to serve the town of Burra, South Australia.

== Opening ==
Burra railway station opened on 29 August 1870 as part of the extension of what was then the Northern Extension Railway to Burra. The railway line was extended further north to Hallett and Terowie in 1880.

== Station upgrade ==
By 1883 the original wooden and corrugated iron station building was proving inadequate for the large numbers of passengers stopping for refreshments. A new stone Victorian-style building, complete with refreshment rooms, was opened in October of that year. An arched roof over the tracks and platforms was retained at that time, not being demolished until 1935. The refreshment rooms remained in service until 1936.

=== Closure ===
In 1978, the station and all associated infrastructure was included in the transfer of the assets of the South Australian Railways to the Australian National Railways Commission. Regular passenger services ceased in December 1986. By 1993 the line north of Burra was closed and removed. In 1997, Australian Southern Railroad (ASR) acquired a 50-year lease on the rail corridor and total ownership of the rail infrastructure as part of the sale of Australian National's South Australian freight assets to ASR. Grain services to Burra last operated in January 1999, with the final rail traffic to the town being a light engine movement by Australian Railroad Group (formerly ASR) locomotive 843 on 12 March 2004.

=== Revitalisation ===
In 2010, restoration works began on the station building, which by then was badly deteriorated. A community group, the Friends of the Burra Railway Station, was formed in 2014 to raise funds and do the work, including the restoration of a dining car that served the Trans-Australian Railway from 1917. The fully restored building includes, as of 2024, Victorian-themed bed-and-breakfast accommodation and a function centre, a museum and a Diprotodon display. Outside the building is the dining car at the platform, a large cast-iron water tank and water columns, and grain silos, now served by road.
