= Hamley Bridge railway station =

Station in South Australia, 1880 to 1986

Hamley Bridge
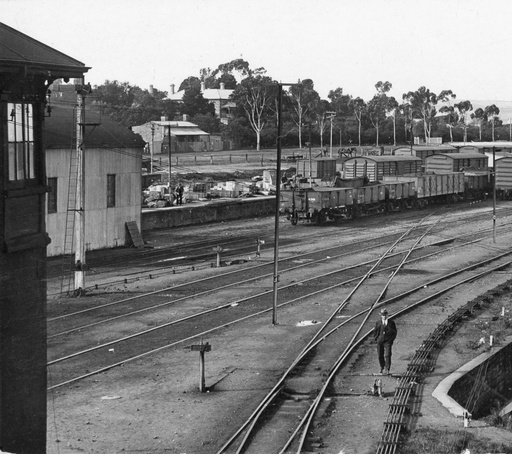
- In the late 1920s, the station yard looking due east, taken from the station building. The foreground tracks and rolling stock are broad gauge; beyond the goods-laden transfer platform is the narrow-gauge track.

General information
- Location: Railway Terrace, Hamley Bridge, South Australia
- Coordinates: 34°21′27″S 138°41′03″E
- Owner: South Australian Railways 1860–1978; Australian National Railways Commission 1978–1997; One Rail Australia 1997–2022; Aurizon 2022–present
- Operator: South Australian Railways 1860–1978 Australian National Railways Commission 1978–1986
- Line: Roseworthy–Peterborough line
- Distance: 76 kilometres from Adelaide railway station
- Platforms: 3
- Tracks: 2

Construction
- Structure type: Ground

Other information
- Status: Closed

History
- Opened: 1880
- Closed: 1986

Services
Preceding station	Aurizon	Following station
Wasleys towards Adelaide	Roseworthy-Peterborough railway line	Stockport towards Peterborough
Preceding station	Aurizon	Following station
Wasleys towards Adelaide	Gladstone railway line	Stockyard Creek towards Gladstone
Location

Hamley Bridge railway station, now closed, is located in the town of Hamley Bridge at the junction of the Roseworthy-Peterborough railway line and the Hamley Bridge-Gladstone railway line in South Australia.

== History ==
=== Opening ===
Hamley Bridge railway station opened on 3 July 1869 as part of the extension of what was then known as the Roseworthy-Forresters railway. It became a junction with the opening of the Hamley Bridge-Balaklava railway on 15 January 1880. The original station opened in 1880 and was a few hundred meters north of the original station originally called Alma. The station facilities included of a main building and four platforms. The foundation stone of the bridge was laid by Lady Edith Hamley, wife of Lt.-Col. Francis Gilbert Hamley, who was then the Governor of South Australia, on 25 July 1868. In 1925 the original stone bridge was demolished and a new bridge was erected in conjunction with the works to convert the narrow gauge line to broad gauge, despite this bridge already being broad gauge. Each platform was an island platform and a signal box was constructed. Silos, cranes and a goods shed were added. There were many sidings and tracks at the rail yards with the junction to the north and sidings for storing wagons to the south. The town of Hamley Bridge was named after the railway bridge over the Light River on the south side of the station for the Peterborough line. The bridge was 91 metres long and 24 metres high, in two spans on stone abutments and a cast iron cylindrical pier 1.8 metres in diameter.

=== Break of gauge ===
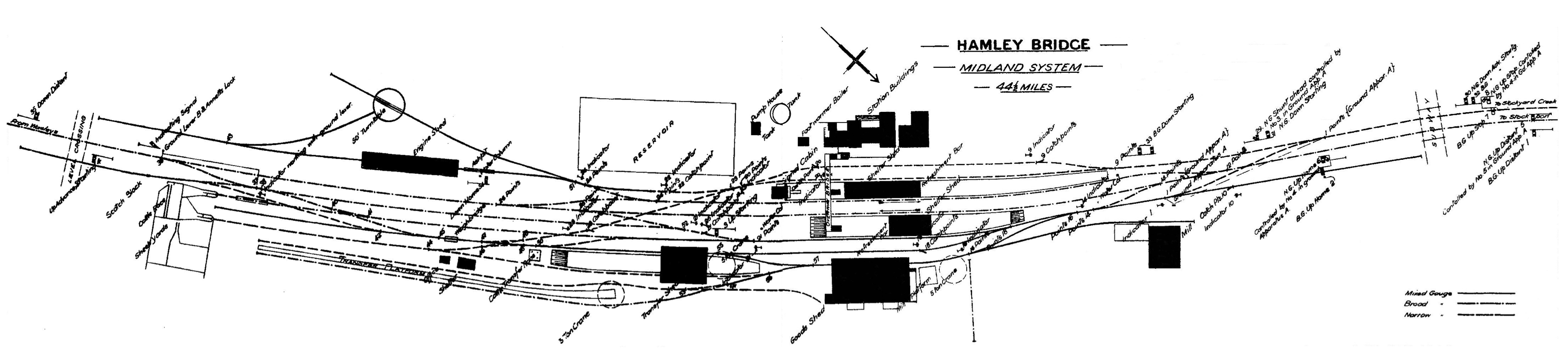
South Australian Railways signalling and track diagram of Hamley Bridge as a dual-gauge station, 1913

Hamley Bridge was a break of gauge station with the Hamley Bridge-Balaklava line being constructed as narrow gauge. The Peterborough line was constructed as broad gauge. This problem was solved when the line to Balaklava (later extended to Gladstone) was converted to broad gauge in 1927.

== Closure ==
In 1978, the station and all associated infrastructure was included in the transfer of South Australian Railways to Australian National. Regular passenger services ceased in December 1986 but some special train tours used the station up until 2004. In 1997, the station and railway lines were included in the transfer of Australian National's freight assets to Australian Southern Railroad (later known as One Rail Australia.) Grain trains last used the line to Balaklava in 2004 Grain trains last used the silos at Hamley Bridge on 31 October 2005. The station remnants and railway line were included in Aurizon's purchase of One Rail Australia in 2022.

== Present day ==
The platforms, railway tracks and the station building remain. The silos were demolished in October 2022. The station building has been converted into a private residence. The station is located in the local council of Wakefield.
