= Hallett railway station =

Former railway station in South Australia, Australia

Hallett

General information
- Location: Barrier Highway, Hallett, South Australia
- Coordinates: 33.42061382230848°S 138.89217144523084°E
- Elevation: 600 m (2,000 ft)
- Operator: Australian National
- Line: Roseworthy-Peterborough line
- Distance: 193 kilometres from Adelaide
- Platforms: 1
- Tracks: 1

Construction
- Structure type: Ground

Other information
- Status: Closed

History
- Opened: 10 March 1878
- Closed: December 1986
Location

Hallett railway station was located on the Roseworthy-Peterborough railway line. It served the town of Hallett, South Australia.

== History ==
Hallett railway station opened on 10 March 1878 as the short-lived terminus of the Burra Burra railway line which was extended to Terowie on 14 December 1880. Hallett was one of the highest railway stations in South Australia at 600 metres. In 1978, the station and all associated infrastructure was included in the transfer of South Australian Railways to Australian National. The station closed for regular passenger use on 13 December 1986. The last passenger train, a Steamrail Victoria tour using Victorian locomotive R761 used the station on 6 June 1987. The line through Hallett was taken up in 1992/93. The station is now a stop on the Heysen Trail and houses a walk-in site for travelers.
