= South Australian Railways 620 class =

Class of Australian 4-6-2 locomotives

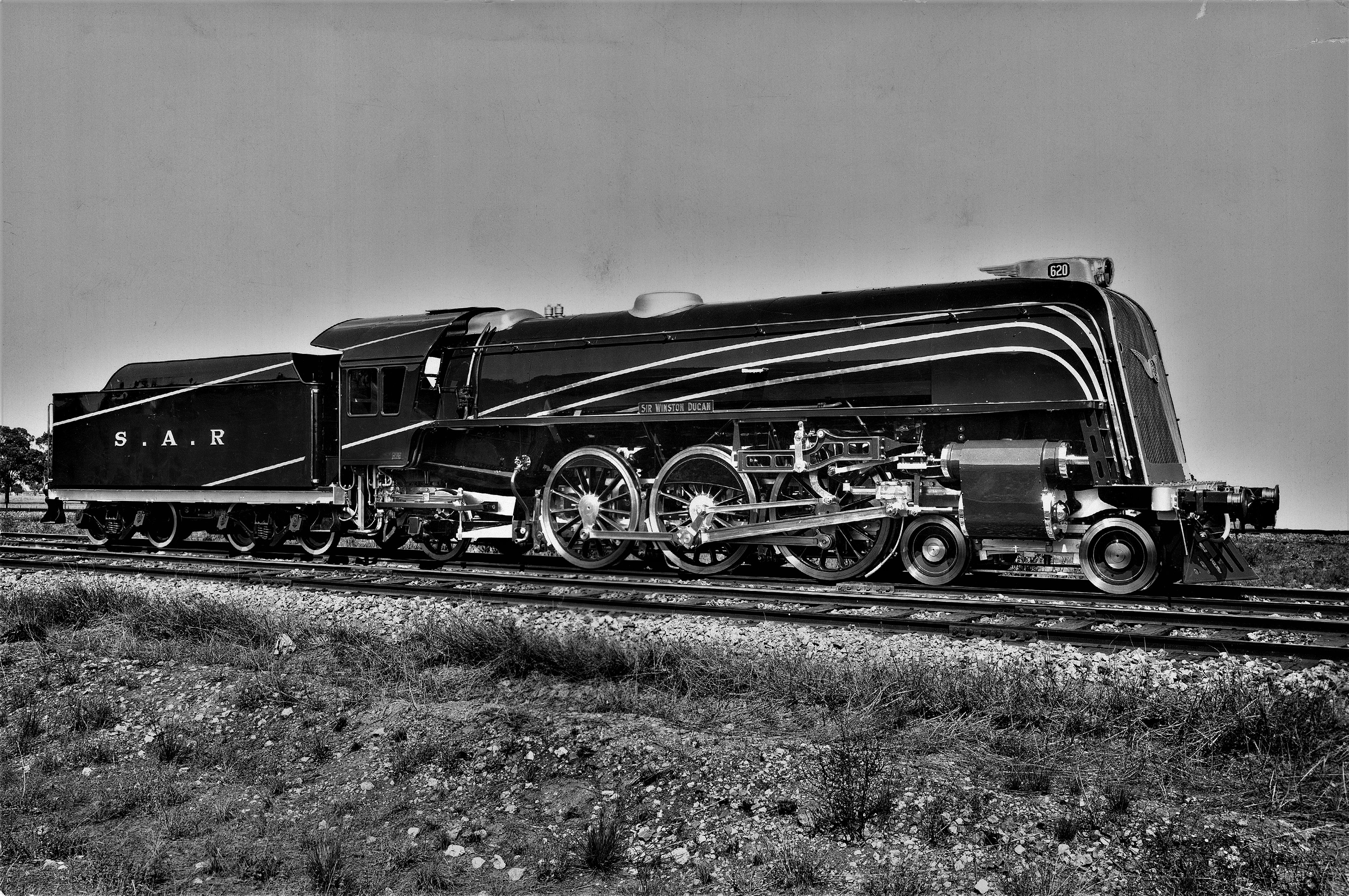
- South Australian Railways 620 class locomotive No. 620 "Sir Winston Dugan", 1936
Type and origin
- Power type: Steam
- Designer: Fred Shea
- Builder: Islington Railway Workshops
- Serial number: 620-629
- Model: 5782
- Build date: 1936-1938
- Total produced: 10
Specifications
- Configuration
  - Whyte: 4-6-2 2′C1′ 2′2′
- Gauge: 5 ft 3 in (1,600 mm)
- Leading dia.: 2 ft 9 in (838 mm)
- Driver dia.: 5 ft 6 in (1,676 mm)
- Trailing dia.: 3 ft 6 in (1,067 mm)
- Length: 69 ft 8 in (21.23 m)
- Height: 12 ft 6 in (3,810 mm)
- Axle load: 15 long tons 18 cwt (35,600 lb or 16.2 t); 17.8 short tons
- Adhesive weight: 47 long tons 5 cwt (105,800 lb or 48 t); 52.9 short tons
- Loco weight: 81 long tons 10 cwt (182,600 lb or 82.8 t); 91.3 short tons
- Total weight: 140 long tons 15 cwt (315,300 lb or 143 t); 157.6 short tons
- Fuel type: Coal
- Fuel capacity: 9 long tons 0 cwt (20,200 lb or 9.1 t); 10.1 short tons
- Water cap.: 5,200 imp gal (6,200 US gal; 24,000 L)
- Firebox
  - Grate area: 33.4 sq ft (3.10 m^{2})
- Boiler pressure: 200 psi (1,379 kPa)
- Heating surface
  - Firebox: 175 sq ft (16.3 m^{2})
  - Tubes: 1,560 sq ft (145 m^{2})
- Superheater
  - Heating area: 421 sq ft (39.1 m^{2})
- Cylinders: 2
- Cylinder size: 18.5 in × 28 in (470 mm × 711 mm)
- Valve gear: Baker
- Valve type: Piston
Performance figures
- Tractive effort: 24,684 lbf (109.80 kN)
- Factor of adh.: 4.2
Career
- Operators: South Australian Railways
- Class: 620
- Number in class: 10
- Numbers: 620-629
- First run: 26 June 1936
- Withdrawn: 1961-1969
- Preserved: 621 & 624
- Scrapped: 1963-1969
- Disposition: 2 preserved, 8 scrapped

The South Australian Railways 620 class is a class of 4-6-2 steam locomotives operated by the South Australian Railways.

== History ==
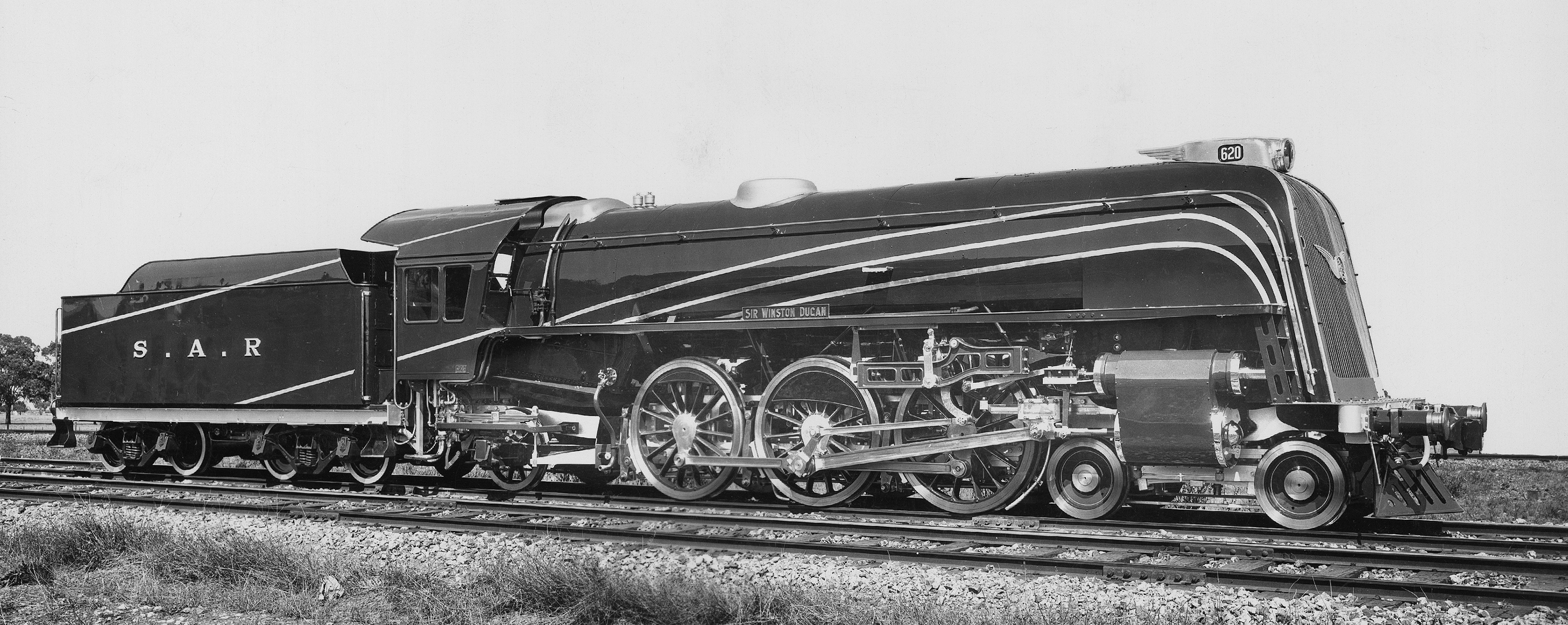
620 Sir Winston Dugan in decorated in green and silver for the Centenary Train which toured the state during the Centenary of South Australia in 1936

The completion of the South Australian Railway (SAR) broad gauge route between Adelaide and Port Pirie created a need for a fast, light passenger locomotive to haul this service, as well as other traffic on the lightly laid 60 lb/yd (29.8 kg/m) rail branch lines of the SAR. The specification included the ability to haul a 200-long-ton (224-short-ton; 203 t) train up a 1-in-45 (2.2%) grade at 25 miles per hour (40 km/h).

Fred Shea, Chief Mechanical Engineer of the SAR, designed a 140-long-ton (157-short-ton; 142 t) Pacific type. A notable feature of the design, unique to South Australian Railways, was the use of Baker valve gear in lieu of the more common Walschaerts valve gear. The first locomotive was completed at the Islington Railway Workshops in 1936; the last in 1938.

Class leader 620 was also notable for being Australia's first streamlined locomotive, the sloping smokebox being covered with a chromed steel grille similar to those fitted to motor cars of the period and painted in hawthorn green and silver. The press of the time described 620's appearance as "a bit of fluff". The remainder of the class was unstreamlined.

In service, the 620 class replaced the Q and S classes on branchline services, where they proved quite successful. With the introduction of the more powerful and modern 520 class from 1943, these locomotives were relegated to the Willunga, Bridgewater and Tailem Bend passenger services, as well as continued service on Murray Mallee line services. The locomotives' light axle loading providing good route ability plus the "get up and go" characteristics common to large wheeled Pacific type locomotives.

The 620 class was phased out in favour of Bluebird railcars, although a spate of railcar failures in 1954–55 saw the 620 class return to service on the Port Pirie line. All were withdrawn between 1964 and 1969.

== Preservation ==
Two have been preserved:

- 621 by SteamRanger
- 624 by the National Railway Museum, Port Adelaide

In 1994, 621 ran a one-off steam hauled tour into Victoria shortly before the Adelaide to Melbourne line was converted from broad gauge to a standard gauge. This was the first and only time a South Australian Railways steam locomotive had worked east into Victoria and with the gauge conversion imminent, the tour would also be the last. The train travelled as far east as Bacchus Marsh, due to the locomotive being too wide for the stations situated along the Melbourne suburban railway system. The locomotive combined with R761 for the majority of the tour from Wolseley in South Australia to Bacchus Marsh in Victoria.

== Class list ==
Number	Date in Service	Date Condemned	Name
620	26 June 1936	July 1961	Sir Winston Dugan
621	7 September 1936	Preserved, operational	Duke of Edinburgh
622	7 October 1936	February 1969	-
623	21 July 1937	July 1964	-
624	17 July 1937	Static Display	-
625	24 August 1937	June 1968	-
626	8 October 1937	February 1969	-
627	26 November 1937	February 1969	-
628	20 December 1937	June 1968	-
629	22 March 1938	February 1969	-
