= South Australian Railways Bluebird railcar =

Self-propelled rail vehicle of the South Australian Railways

Bluebird railcar
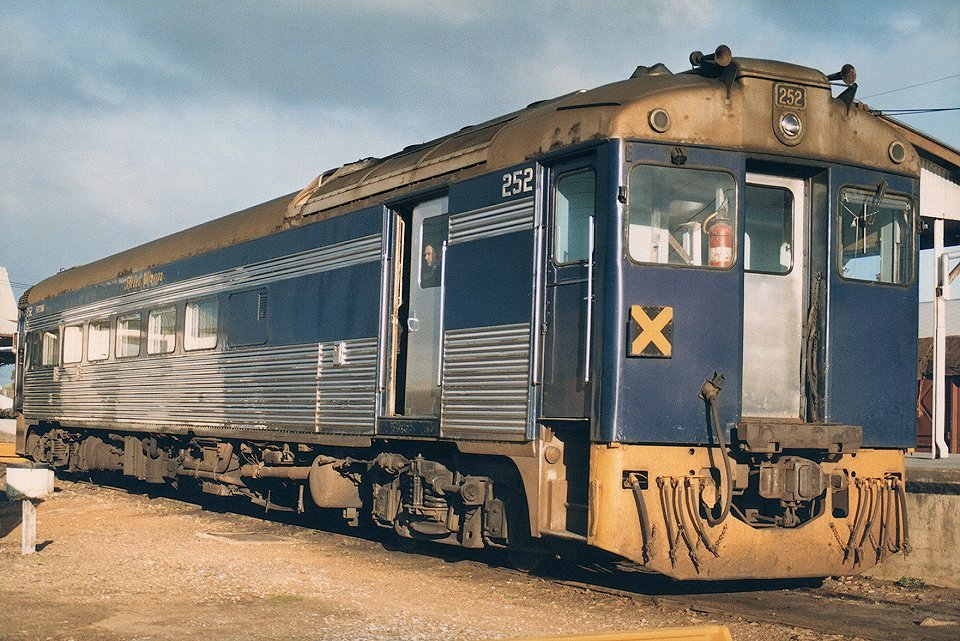
- Bluebird 252 "Blue Wren" at Millicent, July 1983
- Manufacturer: South Australian Railways
- Built at: Islington Railway Workshops
- Constructed: 1954–1959
- Number built: 21
- Number in service: 15 (as crew cars)
- Number preserved: 1
- Number scrapped: 5
- Fleet numbers: 100-106, 250-260, 280-282
- Capacity: 250 class: 56 (some reduced to 52); 100 class: 72; 280 class 20 tonnes (20 long tons; 22 short tons)
- Operators: South Australian Railways; Australian National and others

Specifications
- Car length: 100/250 class: 23.85 m (78 ft 3 in); 280 class: 20.42 m (67 ft 0 in)
- Width: 2.97 m (9 ft 9 in)
- Height: 4.17 m (13 ft 8 in)
- Maximum speed: 112 km/h (70 mph)
- Weight: 250/280 class: 60 tonnes (59.05 long tons; 66.14 short tons); 100 class: 42 tonnes (41.34 long tons; 46.30 short tons)
- Prime mover: 2 x Cummins NT-855
- Engine type: Diesel
- Cylinder count: 6
- Cylinder size: ?
- Auxiliaries: General Motors 3-71 cylinder diesel
- Bogies: Bradford Kendall
- Braking systems: Westinghouse air brakes
- Track gauge: 1,435 mm (4 ft 8 1/2 in) standard gauge 1,600 mm (5 ft 3 in)

The Bluebird railcars were a class of self-propelled diesel-hydraulic railcar built by the South Australian Railways' Islington Railway Workshops between 1954 and 1959.

== History ==
The horn of a Bluebird railcar

The Bluebird railcars were built to provide modern air-conditioned services on the country passenger rail system where the patronage did not warrant the use of locomotive hauled passenger trains, and to replace the ageing fleet of Brill railcars introduced in 1924.

In December 1948, tenders were called for 30 sets of engines, gearboxes, electrical assemblies and compressors. The contract for the engines was awarded to Cummins while the contract for the eight-speed gearboxes was awarded to Cotal of France. All of the engines had been received by May 1952, but problems with the gearboxes meant the first did not arrive until January 1954. Cotal subsequently ceased trading in April 1954 with only six gearboxes having been delivered, so an alternative source was found.

Twenty-one Bluebirds were manufactured by the South Australian Railways' Islington Railway Workshops. The fleet consisted of 11 second-class passenger power cars (250 class), three baggage power cars (280 class) and seven first-class passenger trailer cars (100 class). They were first introduced in October 1954; the last unit entered service on 12 November 1959. Their excellent ride, quietness and airconditioning set a new standard in Australian railcars.

The 100 and 250 class were named after birds; the unnamed 280 class baggage cars only carried road numbers. They operated services on the broad-gauge network from Adelaide to Burra, Gladstone, Moonta, Morgan, Mount Gambier, Nuriootpa, Port Pirie, Tailem Bend, Terowie (extended to Peterborough in 1970) and Victor Harbor.

Each Bluebird was powered initially by a pair of Cummins NHHS-600 engines, which were replaced between 1959 and 1965 by Cummins NHHRS engines and again by Cummins NT 855 engines between 1975 and 1977. Auxiliary power was provided by a General Motors 3-71 engine, later replaced by a Deutz unit. In 1971–72, cars 101, 105, 106, 250-253 and 257-259 were fitted with buffet facilities.

In March 1978, all Bluebirds were included in the transfer of the assets of South Australian Railways to Australian National. In 1986, a new computer system required the class leaders to be renumbered as the last member of the class: hence 100 became 107, 250 became 261 and 280 became 283.

By 1985, ten Bluebirds had been fitted with standard-gauge bogies for use on services to Port Pirie, Whyalla and Broken Hill. One was fitted with 20 poker machines, operating tours to Broken Hill from April 1988 to February 1993.

In 1989, shortly before all South Australian country passenger services were withdrawn, the 100 class trailers began to be used as sitting carriages on the Indian Pacific and The Overland. Some were also converted for use as crew carriages on Trans-Australian Railway services. Power car 259 was converted to locomotive-hauled car BM259 in 1990 and had its engines removed in 1991. The last were withdrawn in January 1993 and placed in store at Mile End and later Islington Railway Workshops. In May 1995, no. 257 was donated to the National Railway Museum, Port Adelaide.

In 1997, 15 of the railcars were sold to Bluebird Rail Operations, a business of C.O.C. Limited. In May 1998 Bluebird Rail Operations commenced operating the Barossa Wine Train from Adelaide to Tanunda via the Barossa Valley line with three refurbished Bluebirds (102, 251 and 252). The venture ceased in April 2003, after which the railcars were stored at the National Railway Museum, Port Adelaide.

In 1998, another four (106, 107, 254 and 255) were refurbished and hired to V/Line for Gippsland line services from Melbourne to Warragul and Traralgon. Following mechanical failures while being trialled on the Gippsland line, the railcars were returned in June 1999. One was sold to the Northern Rivers Railroad for use on its Murwillumbah line charter train.

In 2003, four returned to Victoria for a proposed service from Melbourne to Mildura, which did not materialise.

Starting in the 2000s, a majority of the railcars were converted to crew cars at Islington Railway Workshops for private freight operators. Following the sale of the former Barossa Wine Train set to One Rail Australia in 2021 and the sale of BM259 to their successor, Aurizon in 2023, all remaining railcars except 257 are in service as crew cars.

In 2013, 257 was restored to operational condition and is now part of the National Railway Museum's operational fleet. Previously, it had a period of public running in 1998 before being sidelined by electrical problems.

== Disposition ==
The following table shows the disposition of Bluebird railcars in 2024. To expand it, click [show] in the header cell titled "Notes".

Key:	In service	Withdrawn	Preserved	Scrapped

Number	Original name	Entered service	Withdrawn	Scrapped	Owner in 2023/Last Owner	Running no. in 2023/Last Running no.	Notes
250	Quail	October 1954	2012	2012	Genesee & Wyoming Australia	FDAY 4	Renumbered 261 in 1986. Withdrawn 1995 and sold to Bluebird Rail Operations. Converted to crew car FDAY 4 for FreightLink. Destroyed in a bridge washaway Katherine on 27 December 2011, scrapped.
251	Lowan	November 1954	2003		Aurizon	ADHY 251	Withdrawn 1995 and sold to Bluebird Rail Operations. Returned to service in 1998 for Barossa Wine Train and renamed Chardonnay. Stored at Islington Railway Workshops in 2003 and later moved to the National Railway Museum, Port Adelaide. Converted to crew car ADHY 251 for Aurizon in 2024.
252	Blue Wren	August 1955			Aurizon	ADHY 252	Fitted with a buffet in 1972, seating reduced to 52. Withdrawn 1995 and sold to Bluebird Rail Operations. Returned to service in 1998 for Barossa Wine Train and renamed Merlot. Stored at Islington Railway Workshops in 2003 and later moved to the National Railway Museum, Port Adelaide. Converted to crew car ADHY 252 for Aurizon in 2023.
253	Pelican	August 1955			SCT Logistics	PDAY 1	Fitted with a buffet in 1972, seating reduced to 52. Withdrawn 1995 and sold to Bluebird Rail Operations. Converted to crew car for SCT Logistics.
254	Brolga	September 1955			Rail First Asset Management	CDBY 254	Withdrawn 1995 and sold to Bluebird Rail Operations. Renumbered 801 and leased to V/Line 1998–1999. Converted to crew car for CFCLA in 2007.
255	Curlew	March 1956			Rail First Asset Management	CDBY 255	Withdrawn 1995 and sold to Bluebird Rail Operations. Renumbered 802 and leased to V/Line 1998–1999. Converted to crew car for CFCLA in 2007.
256	Kookaburra	December 1956			Aurizon	FDDY 5	Withdrawn 1995 and sold to Bluebird Rail Operations. Converted to crew car for FreightLink in 2003.
257	Kestrel	February 1957	March 1995		National Railway Museum		Fitted with a buffet in 1972, seating reduced to 52. Withdrawn 1995 and gifted to the National Railway Museum. Restored to operational condition 2012.
258	Goshawk	April 1957			SCT Logistics	PDAY 3	Withdrawn 1995 and sold to Bluebird Rail Operations. Converted to crew car for SCT Logistics in 2005.
259	Penguin	November 1957	December 1995		Aurizon		Fitted with a buffet in 1972, seating reduced to 52. Converted to locomotive hauled car BM 259 in 1990. Withdrawn 1995 and sold to International Development Services. Sold in 1998 to West Coast Railway. Sold to Rail Technical Services in 2004. Converted to crew car ADHY 259 for Aurizon 2024.
260	Corella	November 1959			SCT Logistics	PDAY 2	Withdrawn 1995 and sold to Bluebird Rail Operations. Converted to crew car for SCT Logistics in 2005.
280		December 1958	1995	1995			Renumbered 283 1986
281		December 1958	1995	1995			
282		May 1959	1995	1995			
100	Mopoke	September 1955			Pacific National	RZDY 100	Renumbered 107 1986. Withdrawn 1995 and sold to Bluebird Rail Operations. Renumbered 811 and leased to V/Line 1998–1999. Renumbered back to 100 and named Cabernet for Barossa Wine Train in 2001. Sold to CFCLA in 2002. Converted to crew car for Pacific National in 2006.
101	Grebe	October 1955			Aurizon	FDDY 1	Converted to locomotive hauled car BR 101 in 1990. Withdrawn 1995 and sold to Bluebird Rail Operations. Sold to FreightLink 2003 and converted to crew car in 2004.
102	Plover	November 1955			Aurizon	ADHY 102	Converted to locomotive hauled car BR 102 in 1990. Withdrawn 1995 and sold to Bluebird Rail Operations. Renamed Shiraz for Barossa Wine Train in 2001. Stored at Islington Railway Workshops in 2003 and later moved to the National Railway Museum, Port Adelaide. Converted to crew car ADHY 102 for Aurizon in 2023.
103	Ibis	June 1956			Pacific National	RZDY 103	Fitted with 20 poker machines, operating tours to Broken Hill from April 1988 to February 1993. Sold to Northern Rivers Railroad 1999. Sold to Pacific National and converted to crew car in 2006.
104	Avocet	February 1958			Aurizon	FDDY 2	Withdrawn 1995 and sold to Bluebird Rail Operations. Sold to FreightLink and converted to crew car in 2003.
105	Snipe	July 1958	2023	2023	Aurizon	FDDY 3	Converted to locomotive hauled car BR 105 in 1990. Withdrawn 1995 and sold to Bluebird Rail Operations. Sold to FreightLink and converted to crew car FDAY 3 in 2003. Destroyed in a collision with a truck at Katherine on 14 June 2023, scrapped.
106	Bittern	August 1958			Pacific National	RZDY 106	Converted to locomotive hauled car BR 106 in 1990. Withdrawn 1995 and sold to Bluebird Rail Operations. Sold to Great Northern Rail Services in 2001. Sold to CFCLA in 2002. Converted to crew car for Pacific National in 2006.

== Gallery ==
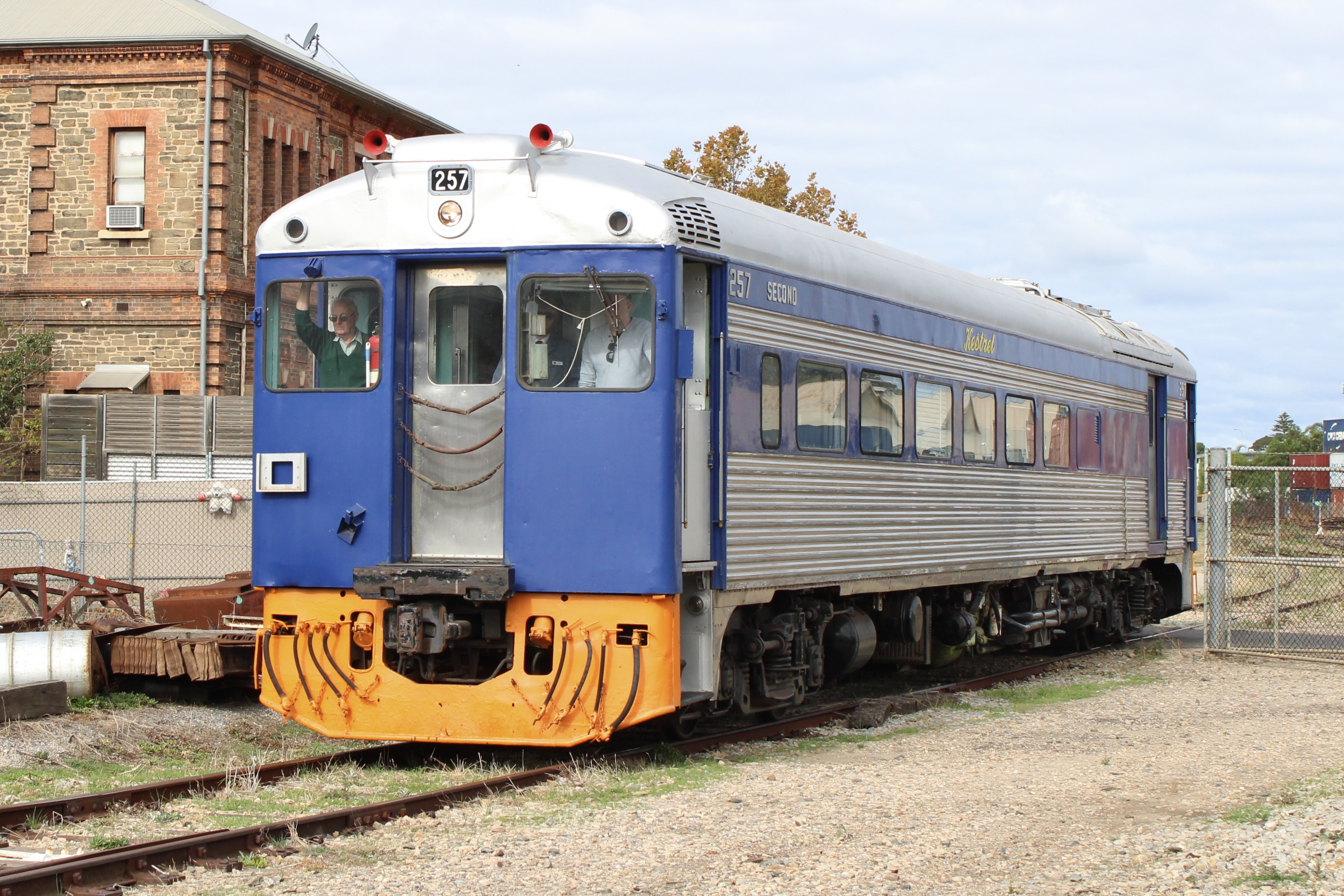
Preserved Bluebird no. 257 operating at the National Railway Museum, Port Adelaide, 2021

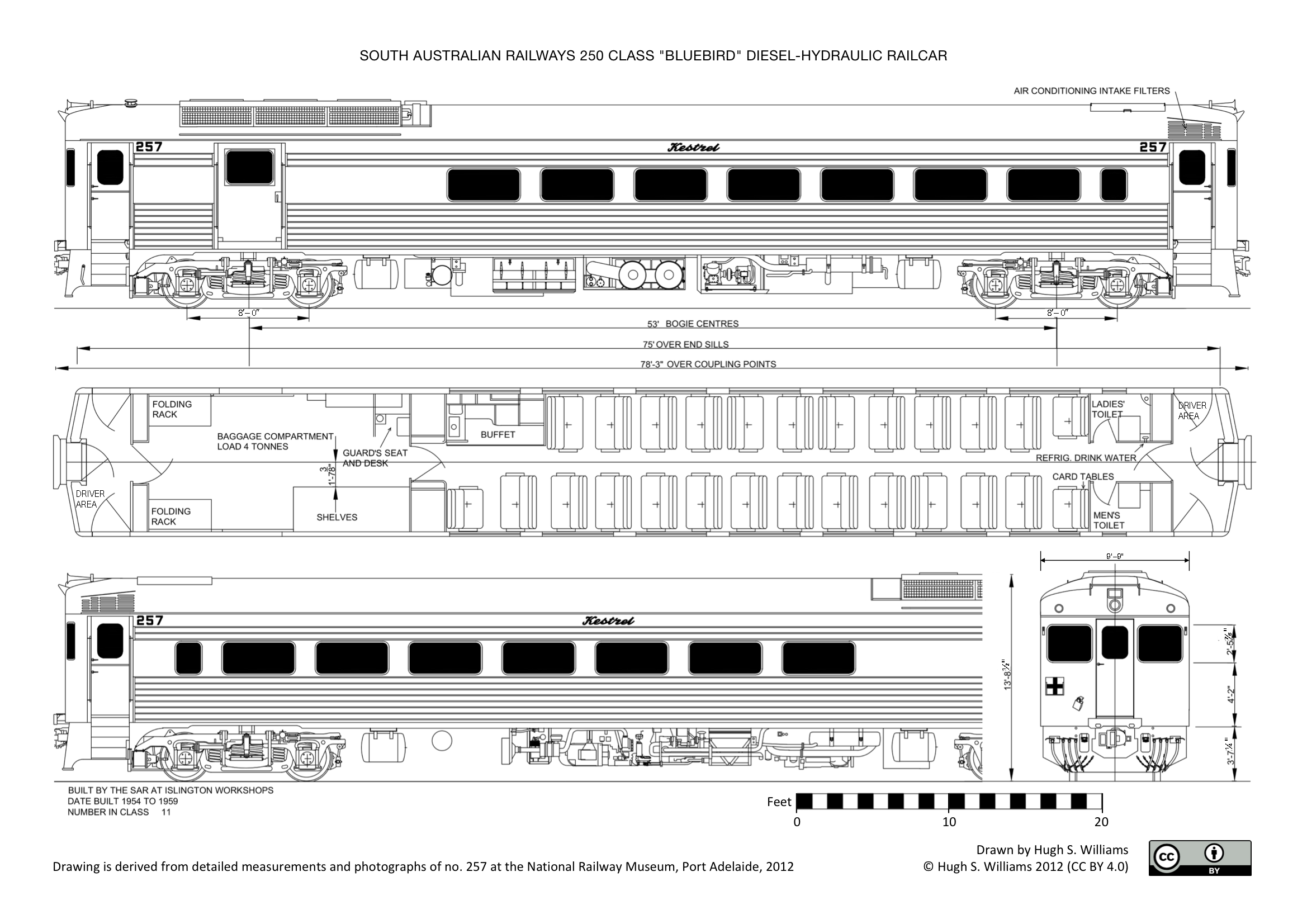
Drawing of South Australian Railways 'Bluebird' railcar 257

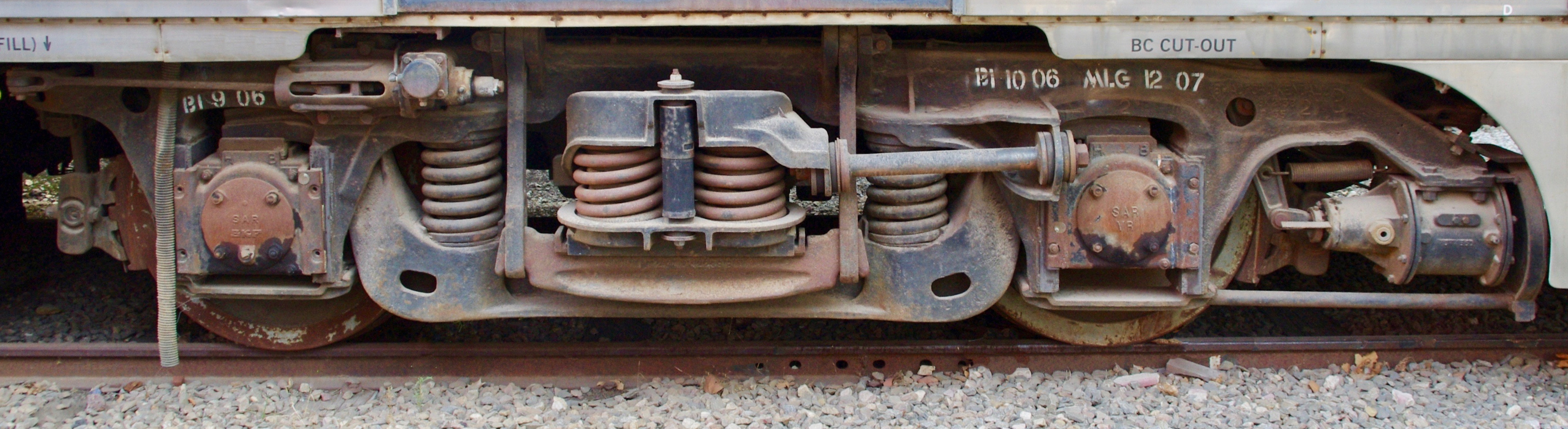
Commonwealth design truck (bogie) on South Australian Railways Bluebird railcar, National Railway Museum Port Adelaide

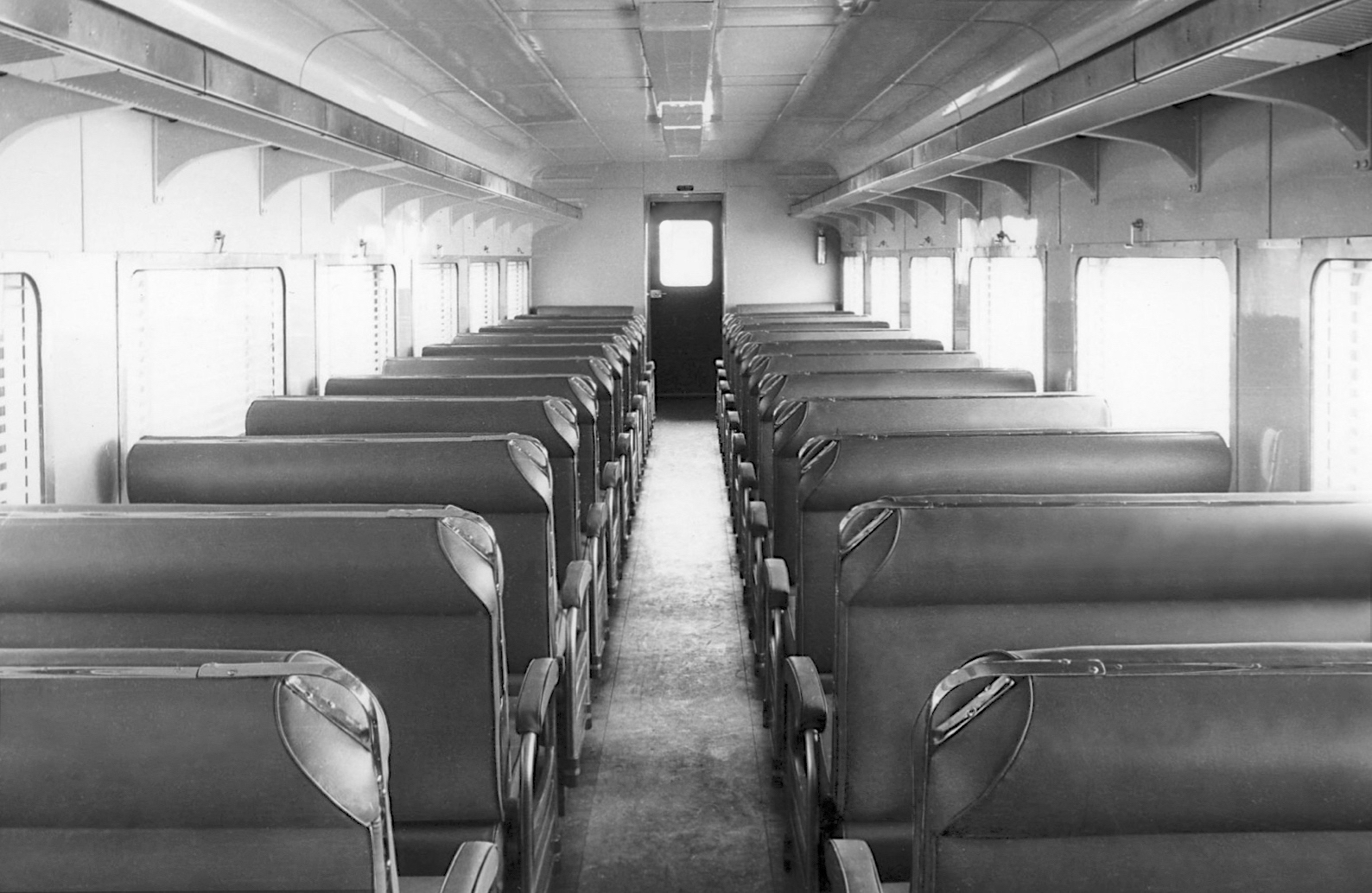
Interior of a South Australian Railways 'Bluebird' railcar (250 class second-class passenger power car)

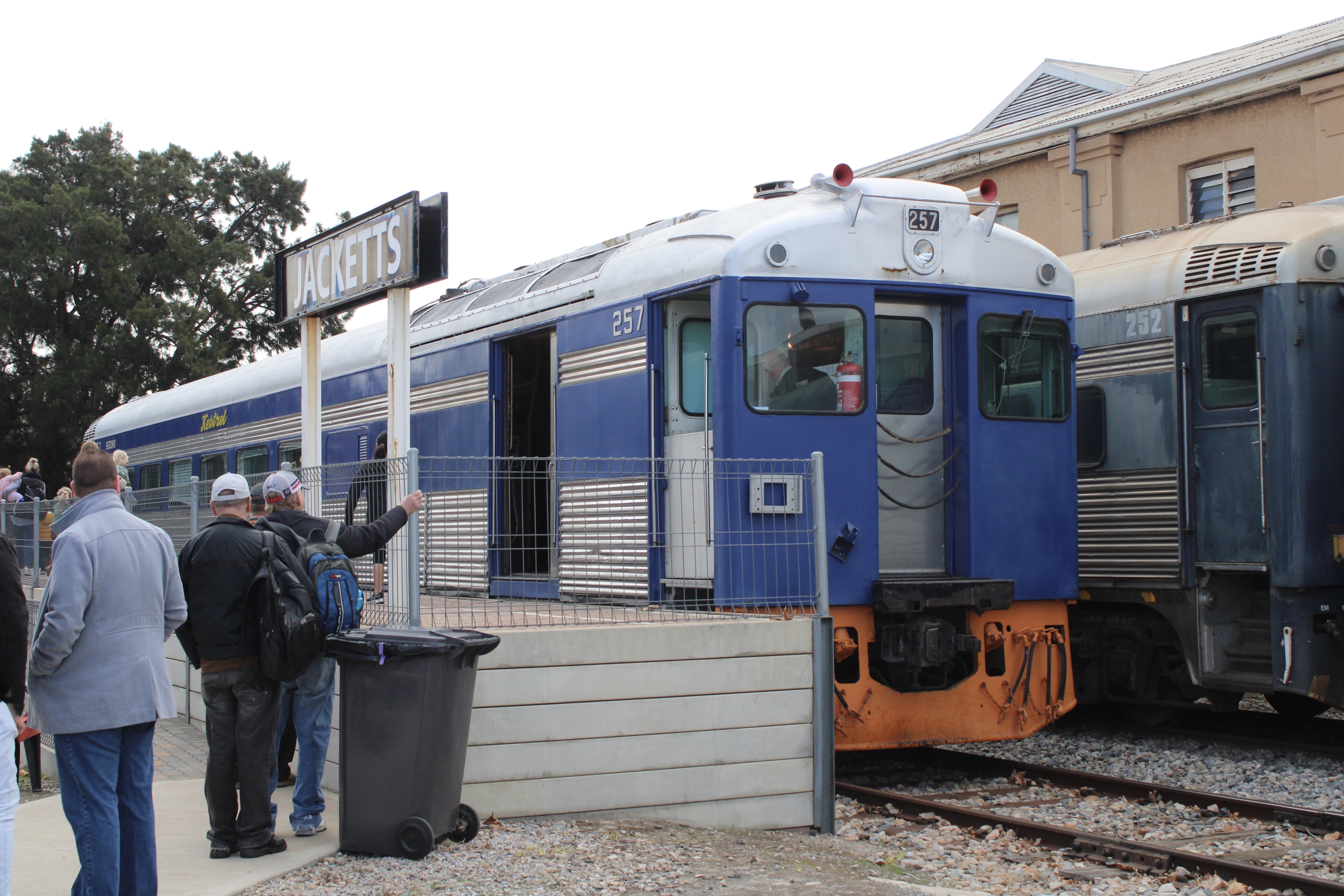
Bluebird 257 stopped at Jacketts siding, the National Railway Museum's station for broad gauge trains before it was demolished for the Port Dock extension project

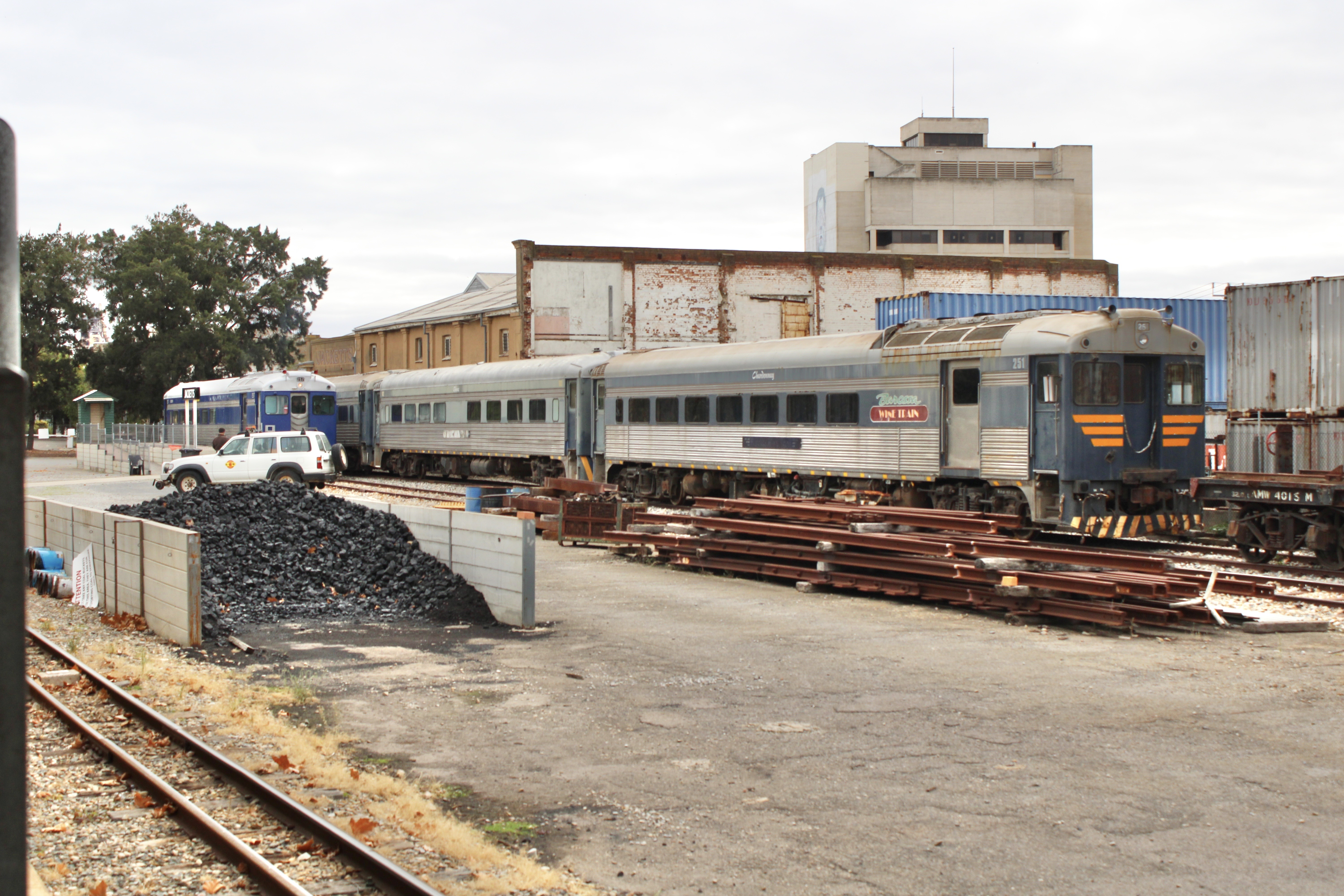
Preserved Bluebird 257 stopped at Jacketts Siding and Barossa Wine Train Bluebirds 251 - 102 - 252 stored at the National Railway Museum, Port Adelaide, 2021

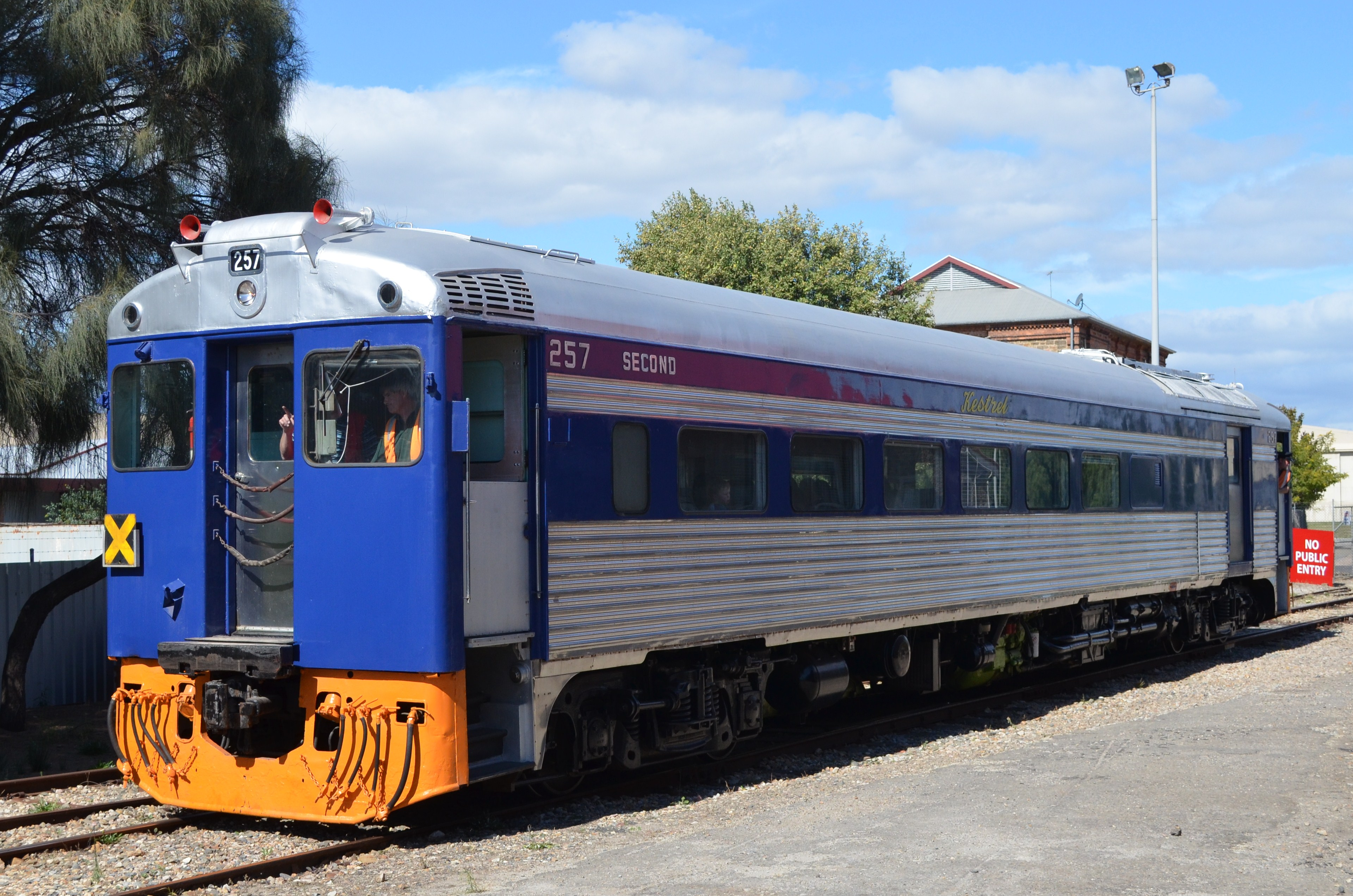
257 at the National Railway Museum, Port Adelaide, 2014

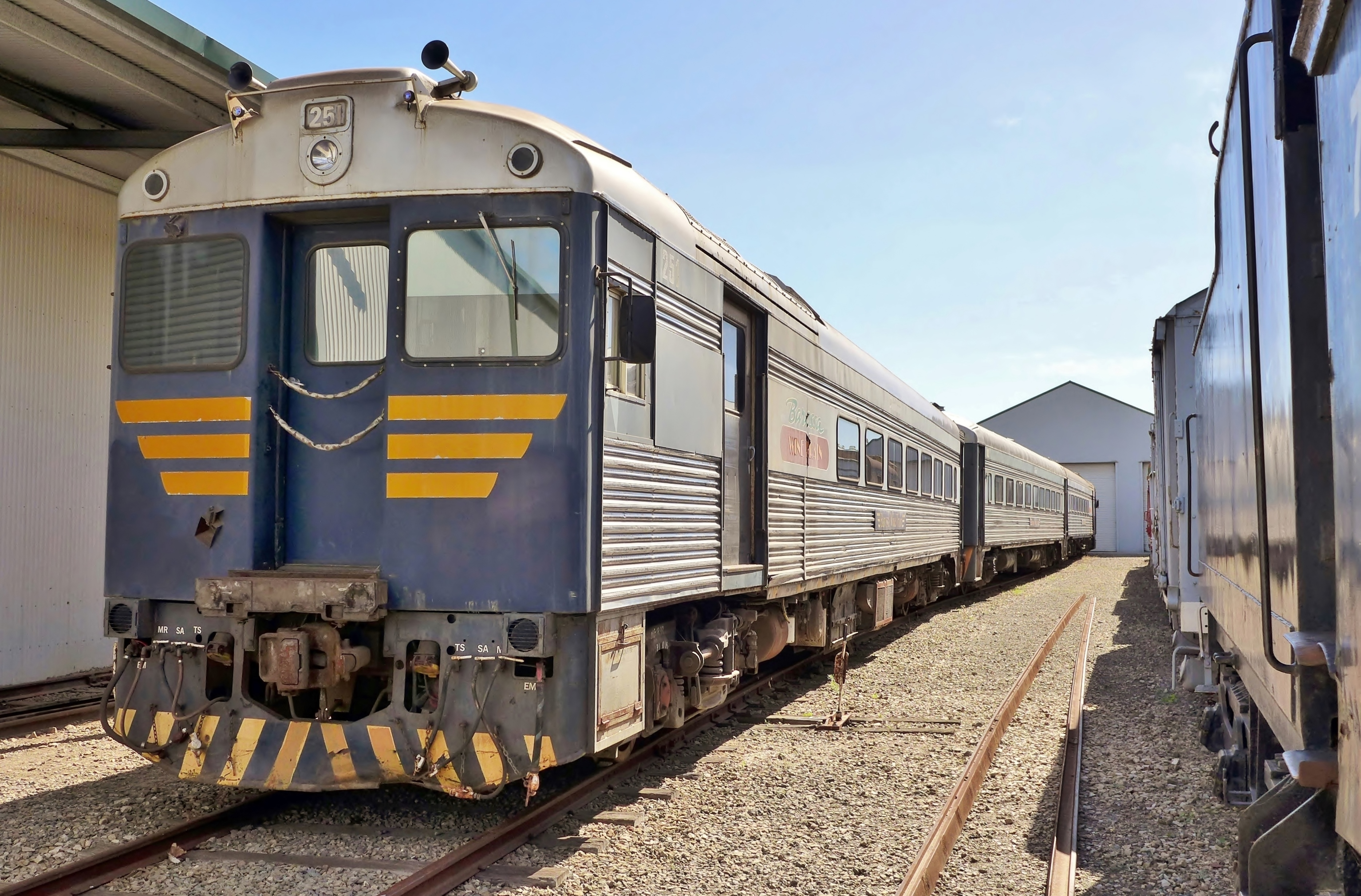
Barossa Wine Train Bluebirds 251 - 102 - 252 stored at the National Railway Museum, Port Adelaide, 2014

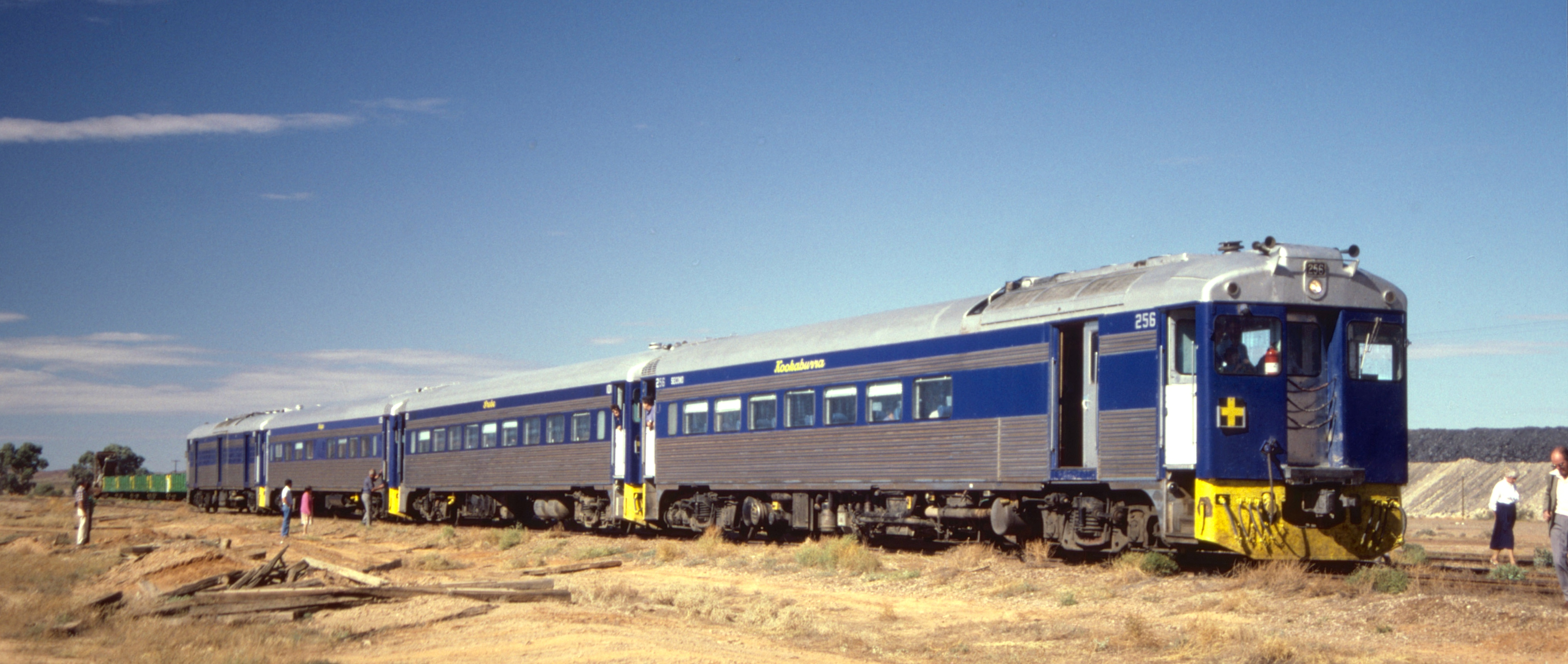
The three types of Bluebird railcars in May 1987 on a charter trip at Telford, South Australia: 250 class power car 256 Kookaburra, 100 class trailer cars 101 Grebe and 105 Snipe and 280 class powered baggage car 282

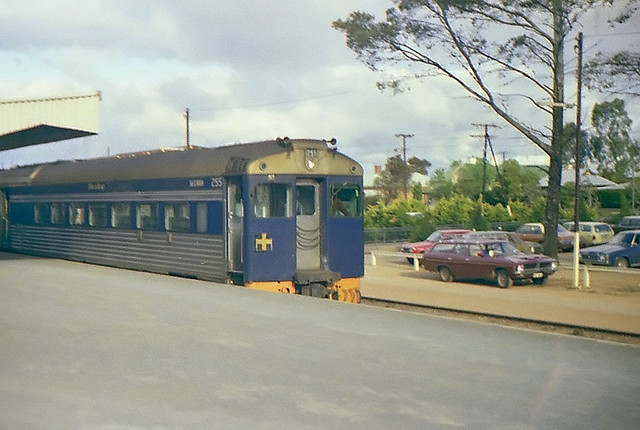
Broad gauge "Bluebird" railcar 255. Peterborough Centenary - 9 October 1976

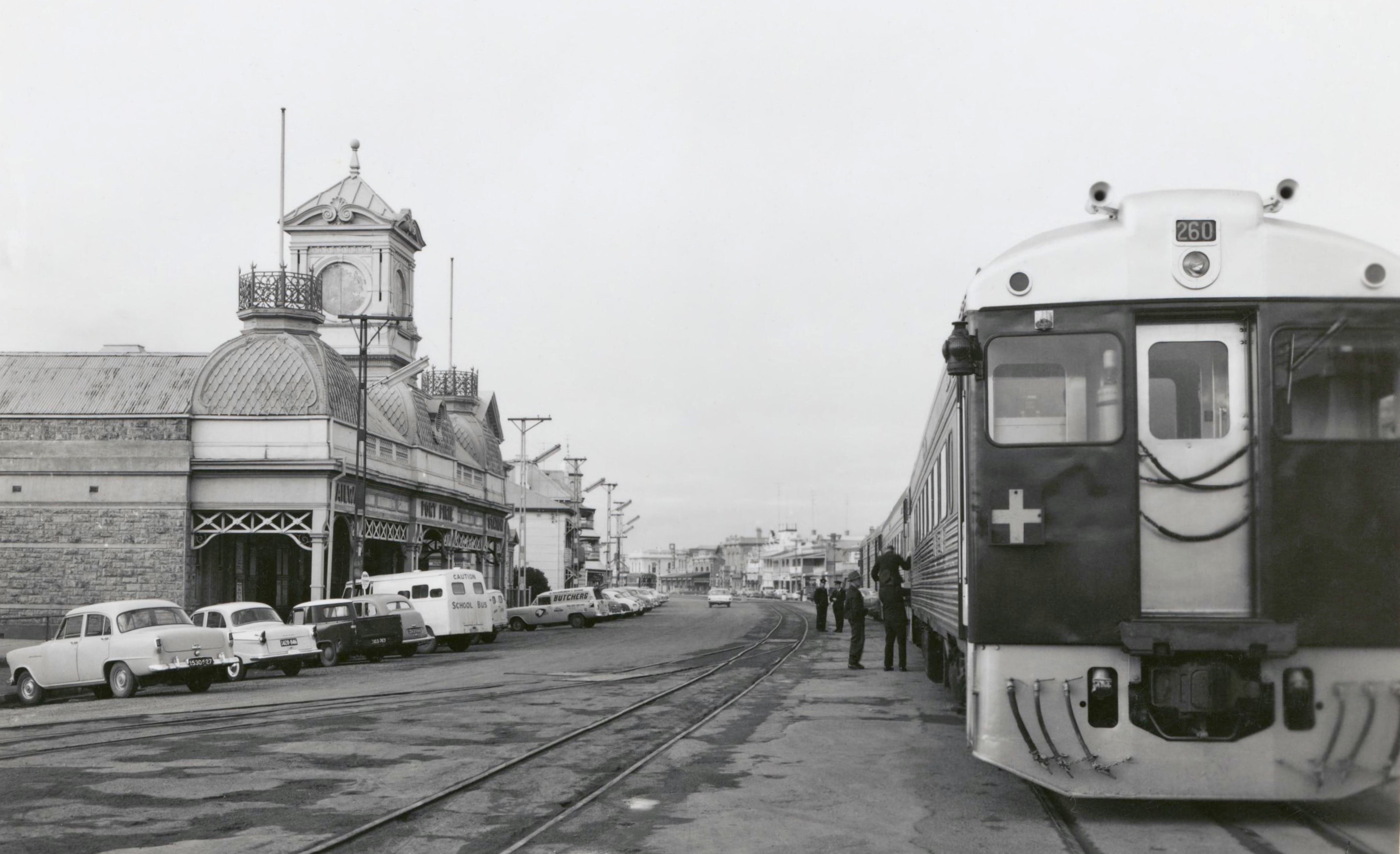
South Australian Railways Bluebird railcar 260 at Ellen Street railway station, Port Pirie, 1962

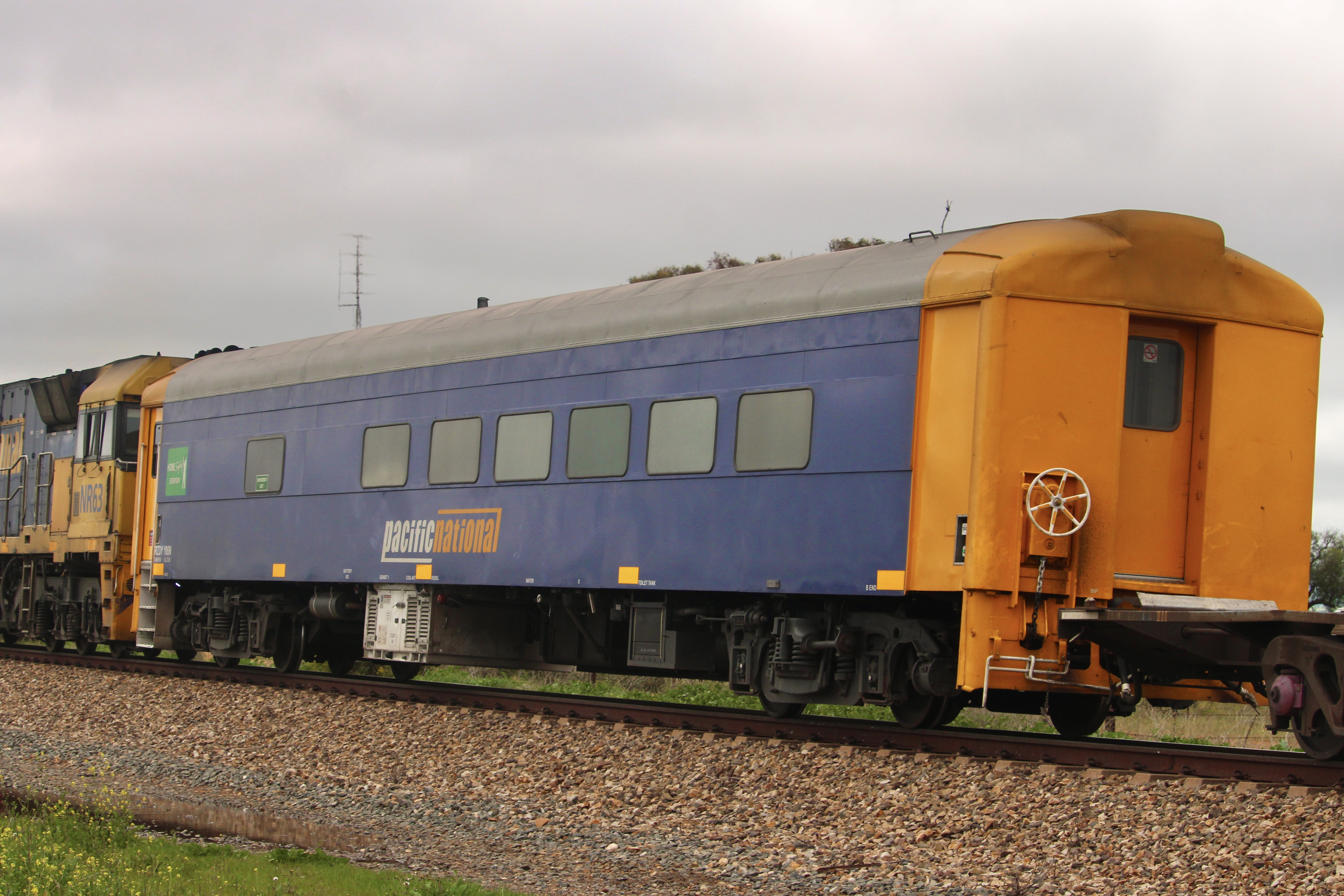
Crew car RZDY 106 (former Bluebird railcar 106 ‘Bittern’) on a Pacific National intermodal train at Snowtown, August 2023.

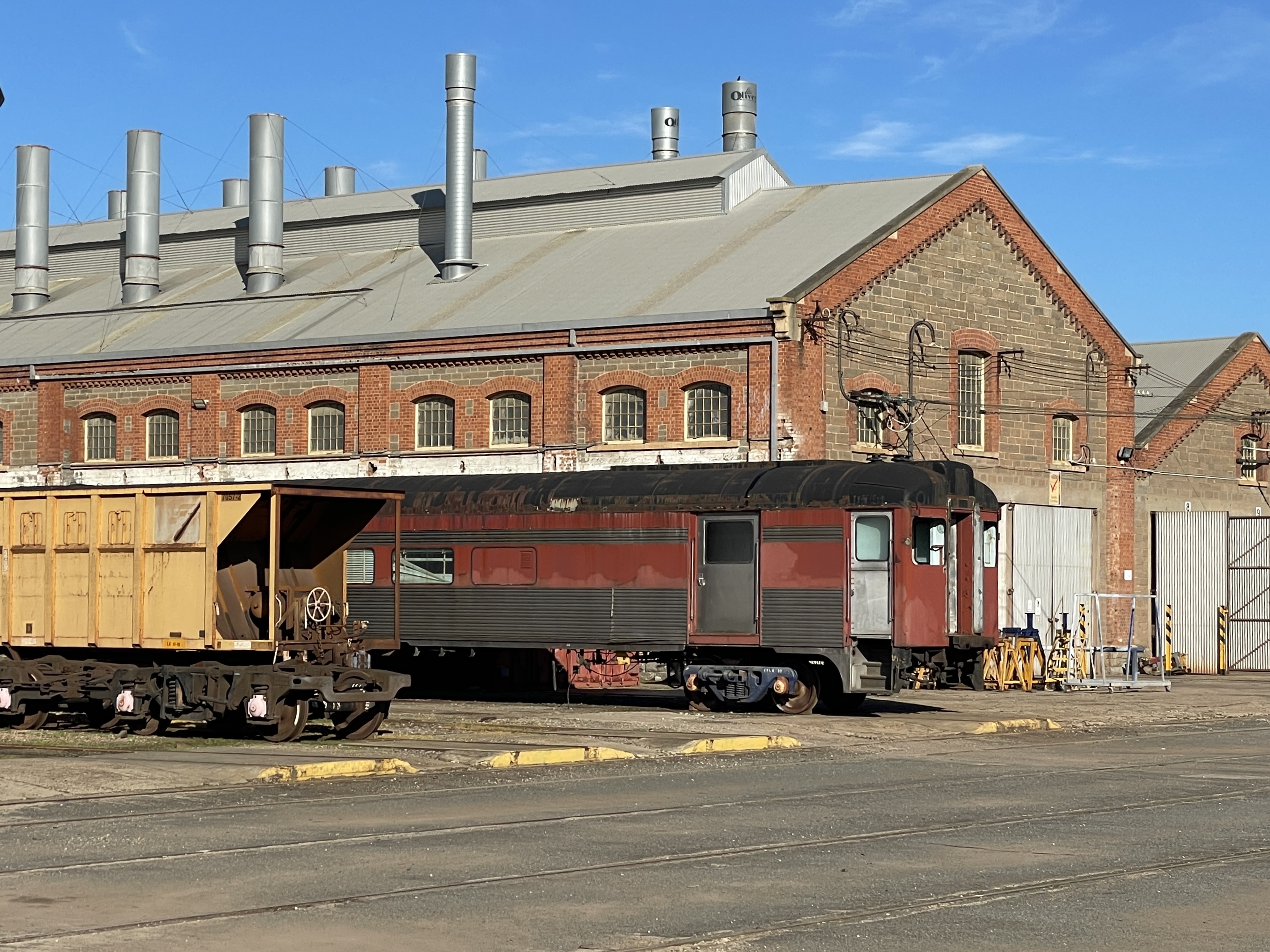
Locomotive-hauled car BM259 (former Bluebird railcar 259 ‘Penguin’) stored at Islington Railway Workshops awaiting conversion to a crew car, July 2023.

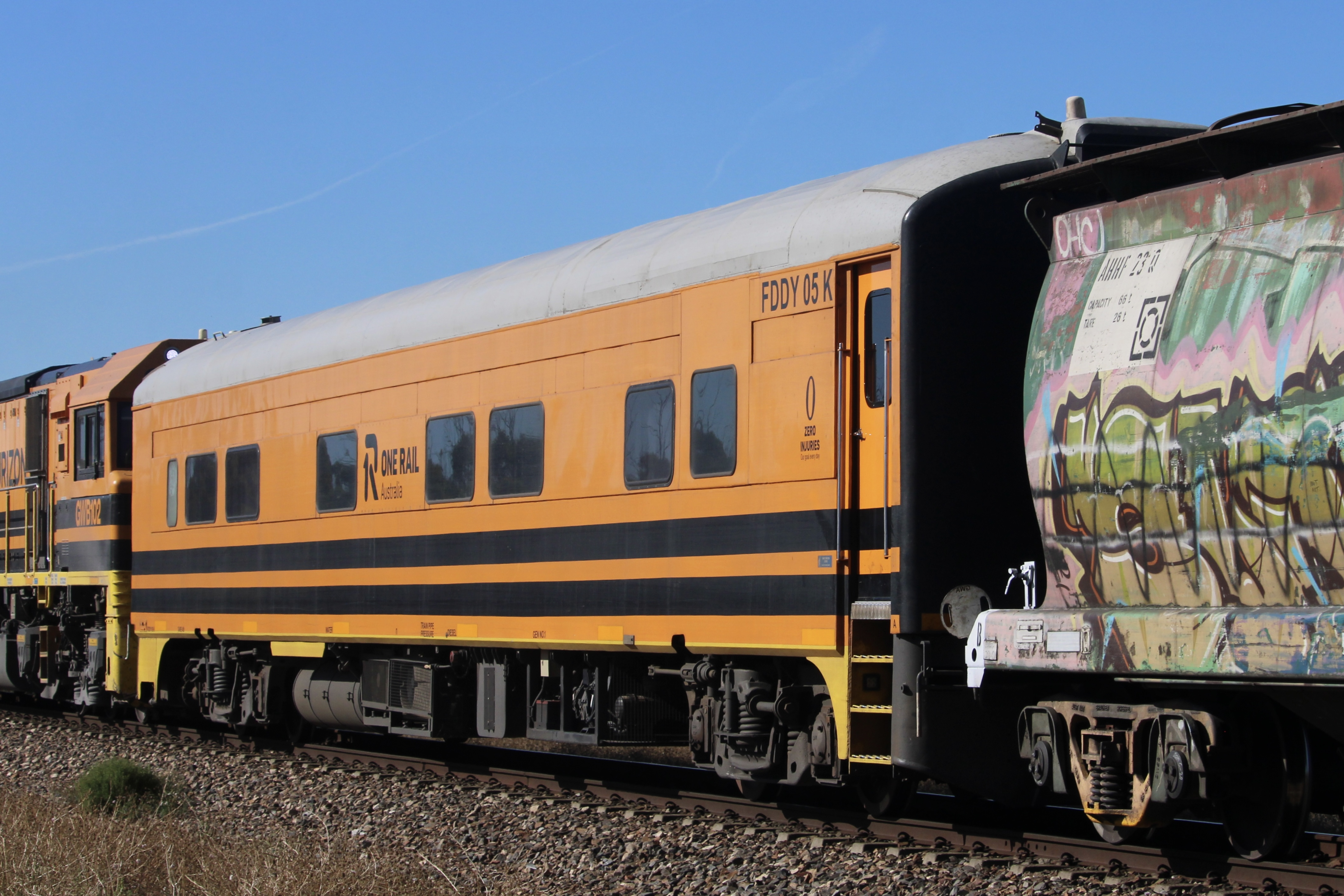
Crew car FDDY 5 (former Bluebird railcar 256 ‘Kookaburra’) on an Aurizon grain train at Yumali, April 2023.

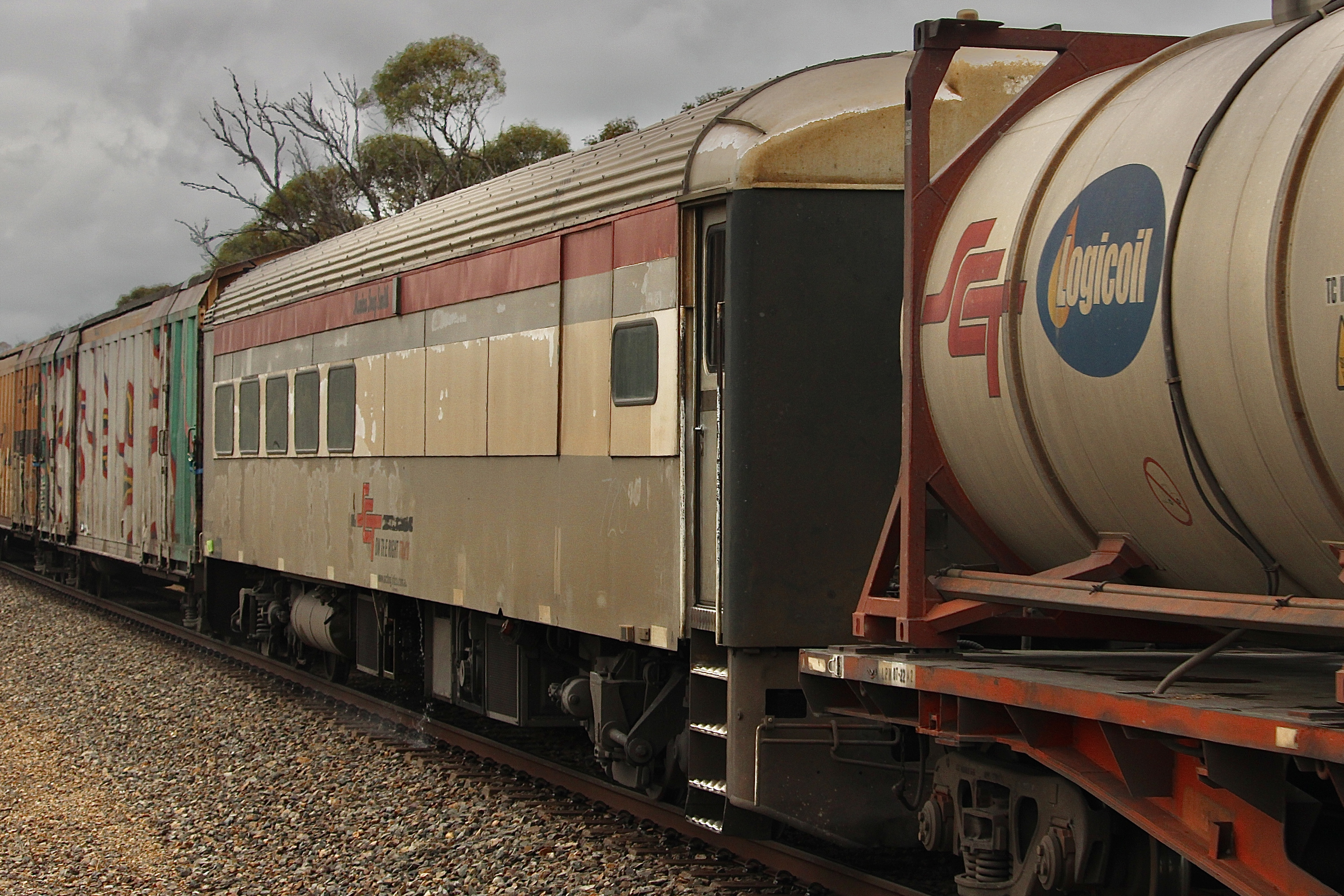
Crew car PDAY 3 (former Bluebird railcar 258 ‘Goshawk’) on a SCT intermodal train at Mallala, October 2022.

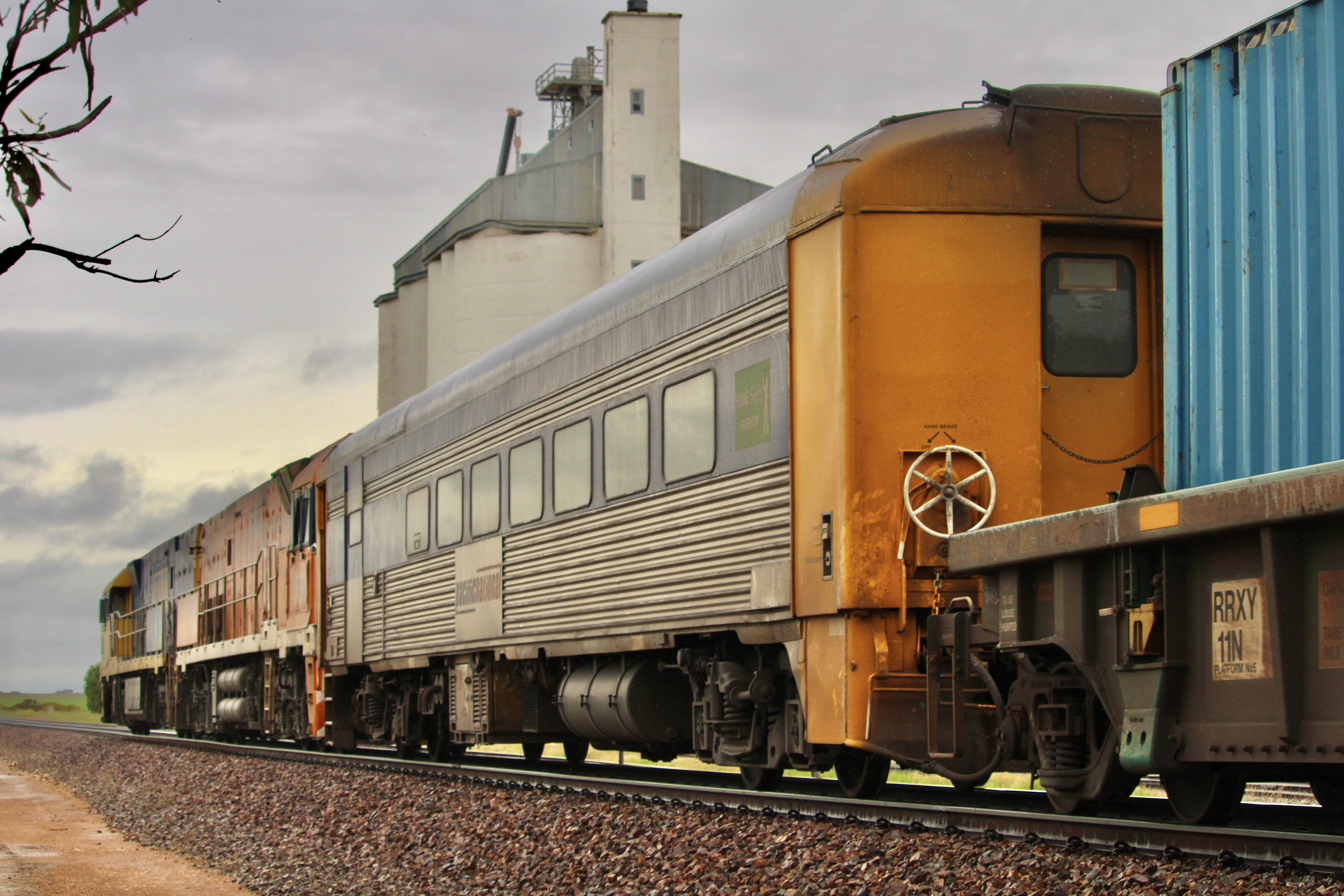
Crew car RZDY 255 (former Bluebird railcar 255 ‘Curlew’) on a Pacific National intermodal train at Long Plains, October 2022.

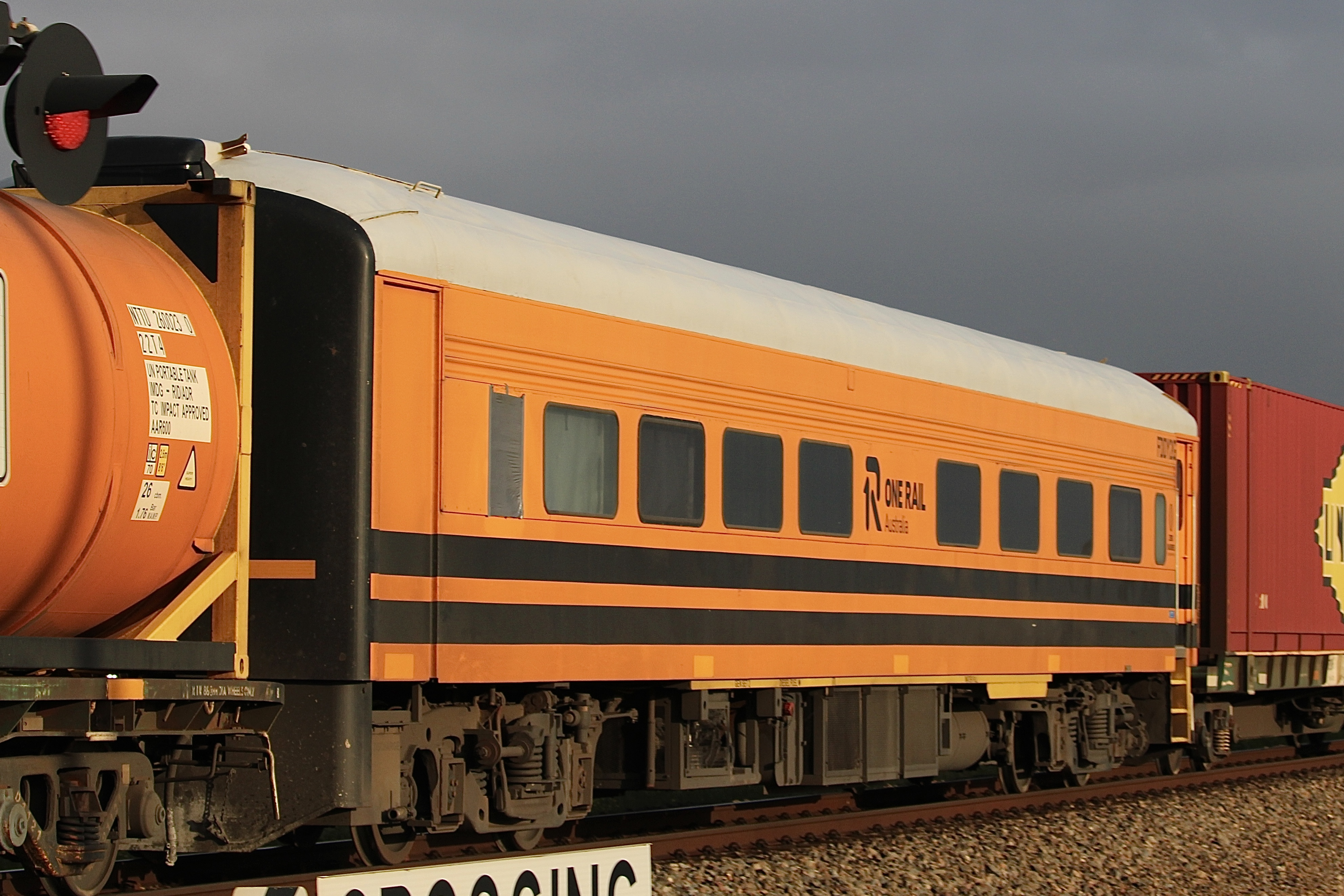
Crew car FDDY 2 (former Bluebird railcar 104 ‘Avocet’) on an Aurizon intermodal train at Virginia, September 2022.

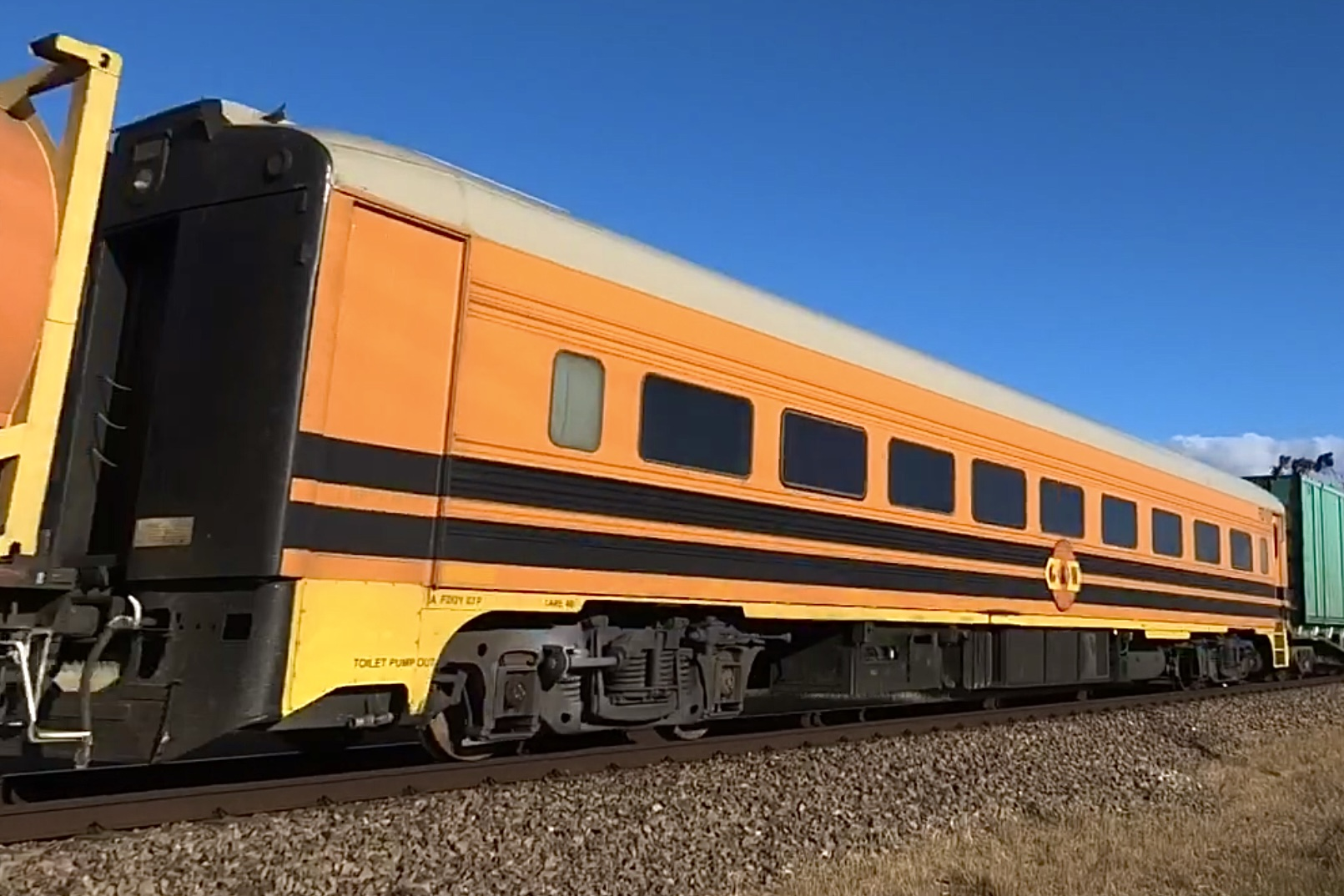
Crew car FDDY 3 (former Bluebird railcar 105 ‘Snipe’) on a One Rail Australia intermodal train at Virginia, October 2021.
