= Port Pirie railway station =

Port Pirie railway station may refer to one of the following railway stations in Port Pirie, South Australia:

- the inaugural railway station, at first named "Port Pirie railway station" and later "Port Pirie South railway station" – from 1876 to 1911
- Port Pirie railway station (Ellen Street) in central Port Pirie – from 1885 to 1967 (the 1902 rebuild continued as a heritage-listed museum building)
- Solomontown railway station, in the Port Pirie suburb of Solomontown – from 1911 to 1969
- Port Pirie Junction railway station, collocated with Solomontown station – from 1937 to 1967
- Port Pirie railway station (Mary Elie Street), in Port Pirie South – from 1967 to 1989
- Coonamia railway station, a "provisional stopping place" on the outskirts of Port Pirie – from 1929 (closed by 1970) and re-established from 1989 to the 2010s.

An overview is in the article about Port Pirie.

== See also ==
- Port Pirie (disambiguation)
