= Port Pirie railway station (Mary Elie Street) =

One of Port Pirie's six railway stations, in operation from 1967 to 1989

Port Pirie railway station (Mary Elie Street) (1967–1989)
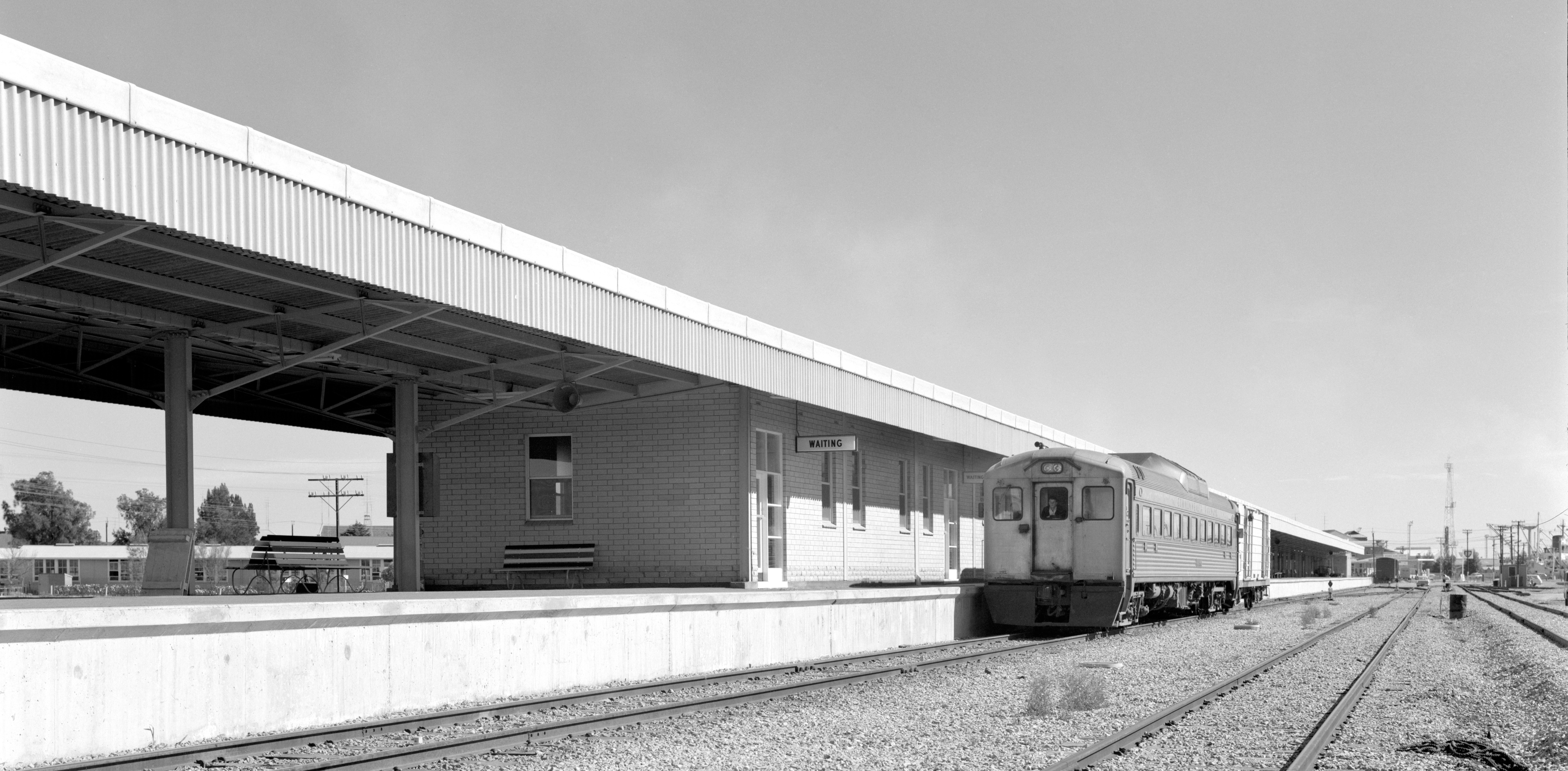
- Budd railcar CB2 and a luggage van waiting on the Commonwealth Railways (standard gauge) side of the Mary Elie Street platform, about half-way along its 700-metre (770-yard) length, about 1969. Broad-gauge South Australian Railways trains arrive on the other side.

General information
- Location: Entrance 3 Mary Elie Street, Port Pirie, South Australia; parallel to Wandearah Road
- Coordinates: 33°11′03″S 138°00′43″E
- Owner: South Australian Railways and Commonwealth Railways 1967–1975; Australian National Railways Commission 1975–1989
- Line: Adelaide to Port Pirie
- Gauge: Standard – 1435 mm (4 ft 8 1/2 in); Broad – 1600 mm (5 ft 3 in)
- Structure: Two concrete brick buildings: booking office and refreshment room
- Platform configuration: One raised island platform: broad gauge on western side (South Australian Railways), standard gauge on eastern side (Commonwealth Railways)
- Platform length: 700 metres (770 yards)
- Stopping: All through passenger trains on standard-gauge Sydney–Perth rail corridor Passenger trains on broad-gauge line to Adelaide
- Opened: 12 November 1967
- Closed: 1989
- Immediate predecessor stations: Ellen Street, 1885–1967; Solomontown, 1911–1970; Port Pirie Junction, 1937–1967
- Successor station: Coonamia provisional stopping place, 1989–2010s
Location

Port Pirie railway station (Mary Elie Street) was the fifth of six railway stations for passengers that operated at various times from 1876 to serve the small maritime town (later city) of Port Pirie, 216 kilometres (134 miles) by rail north of Adelaide, South Australia. As with several of Port Pirie's other stations before it, the station was built to accommodate a change of track gauge on railway lines leading into the town.

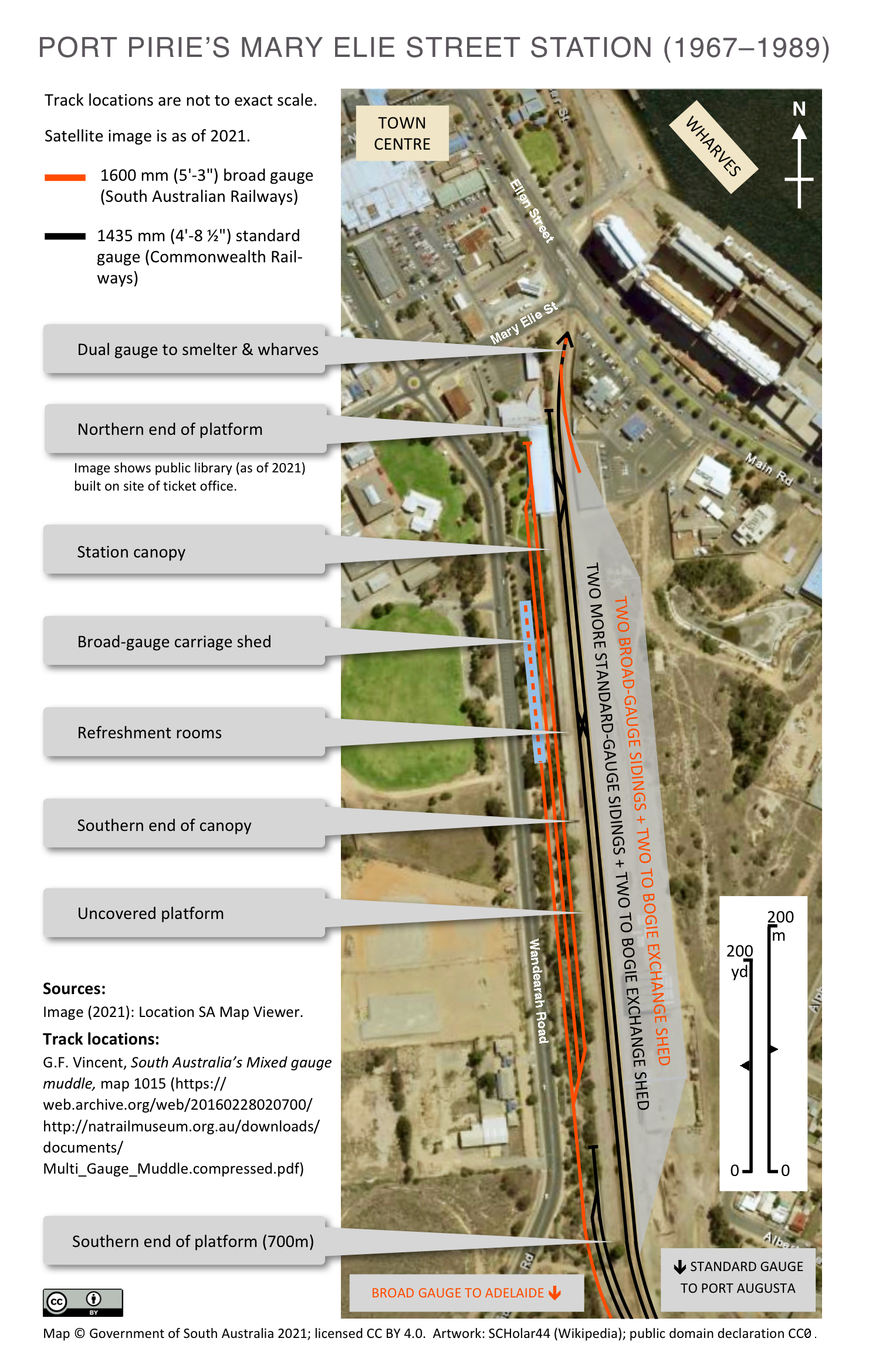
Layout of the station and sidings

Links to the articles about stations in Port Pirie
	Station	Duration	Gauge		
1	Port Pirie (at what became known as Port Pirie South)	1876 to after 1911	ng		
2	Ellen Street	1902–1967	ng	bg*	
3	Solomontown	1911–1967	ng		
4	Port Pirie Junction – also signposted as, and known colloquially as, Solomontown	1937–1967	ng	bg	sg
5	Mary Elie Street (this article)	1967–1989		bg	sg
6	Coonamia stopping place	1st, 1929 to after 1937; 2nd, 1989–2010s			sg
* In 1937, one of the two narrow-gauge tracks along Ellen Street was made dual-gauge by the addition of broad-gauge rails. Gauges are shown in these colours: narrow, broad and standard.

Port Pirie's six stations and the "multi‑gauge muddle"
At various times during a period of close to 140 years, Port Pirie had six railway stations. During the 45-year period 1937–1982, the city became well known as one of the few locations in the world having three railway gauges. (Note: The gauges were 1067 mm (3 ft 6 in), 1435 mm (4 ft 8 1/2 in), and 1600 mm (5 ft 3 in).) This situation was a result of South Australia's slow transition from lightly constructed narrow gauge to heavy-rail broad gauge (which predominated in the state at the time), then to standard gauge when lines between the mainland state capitals were at last unified. As a consequence, all Port Pirie stations that succeeded the inaugural station of 1876 were either built to accommodate a change of gauge or were affected by one. The timeline, reasons for change, and gauges involved are shown in the following graphic.

Timeline of Port Pirie's six railway stations

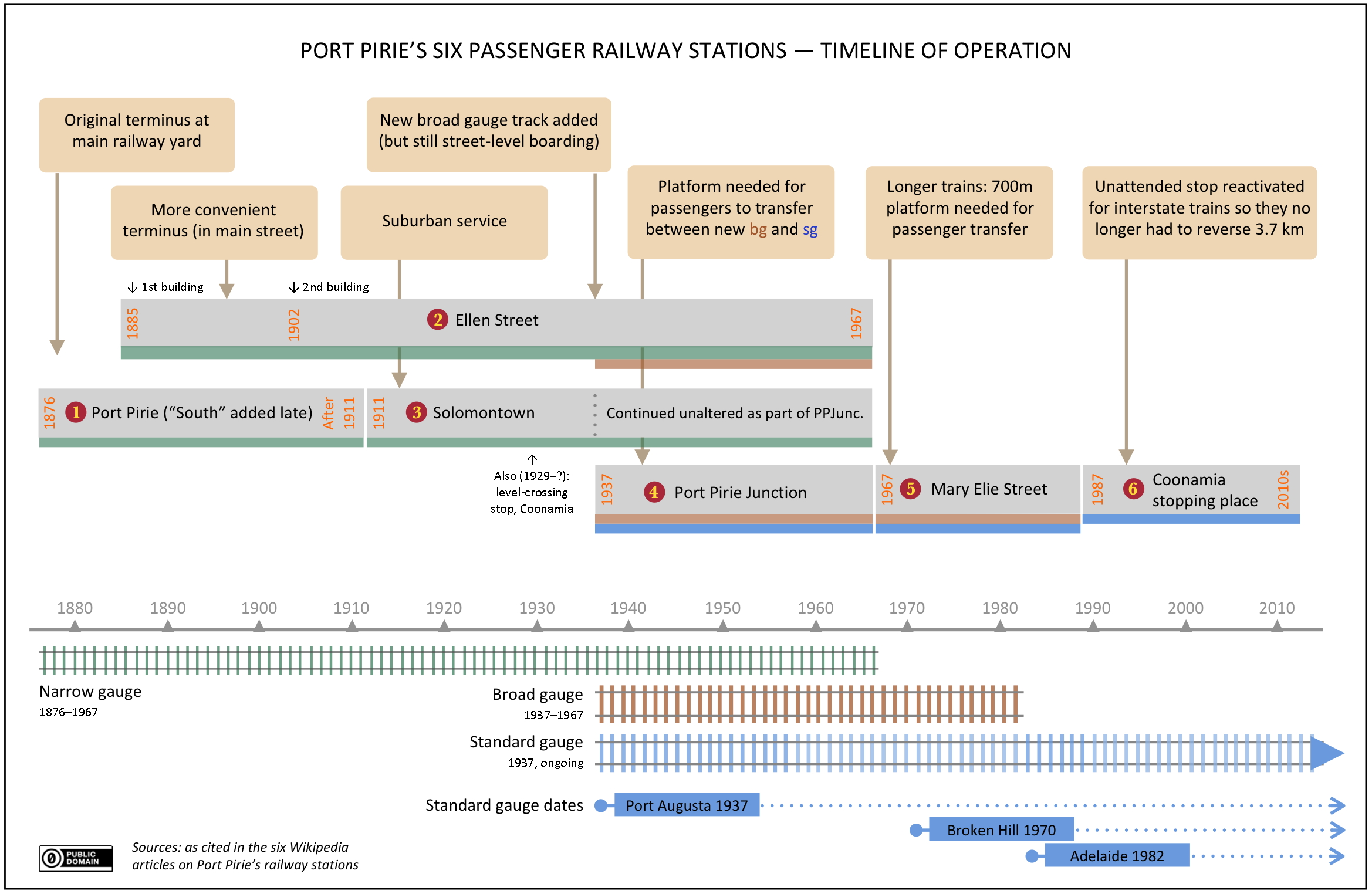

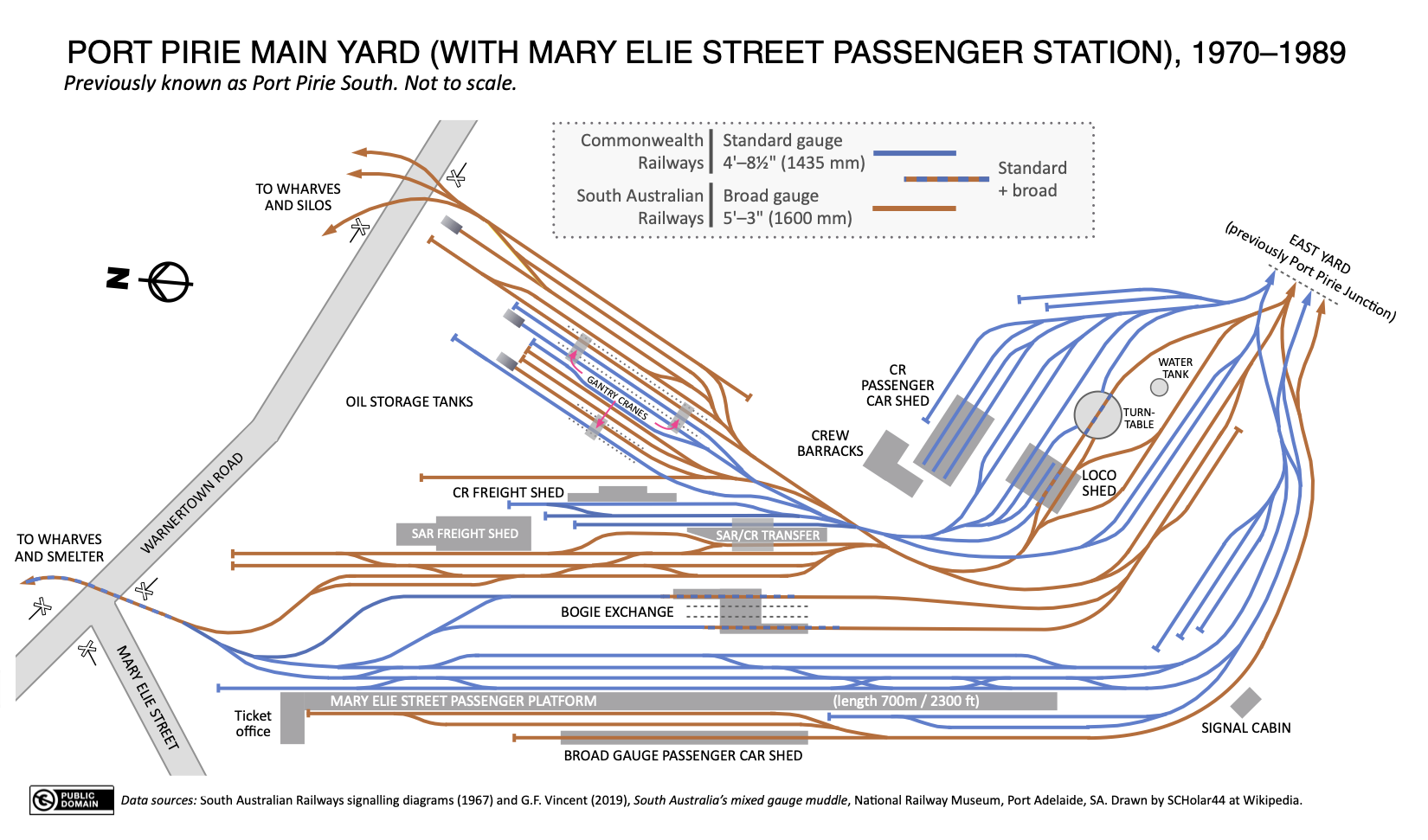
Mary Elie Street's passenger facilities were dwarfed by the sidings (standard gauge blue, broad gauge brown) installed in readiness for the conversion of the South Australian sector of the Sydney–Perth rail corridor to 1435 mm (4 ft 8 1/2 in) standard gauge. (Click to enlarge.)

== Need for a new station ==
In 1966, planning commenced for the long-overdue conversion to 1435 mm (4 ft 8 1/2 in) standard gauge of the South Australian Railways 1067 mm (3 ft 6 in) narrow gauge line from Port Pirie to the New South Wales border. This project was to culminate in 1970, when for the first time trains were able to travel the entire Sydney–Perth rail corridor without a change of gauge.

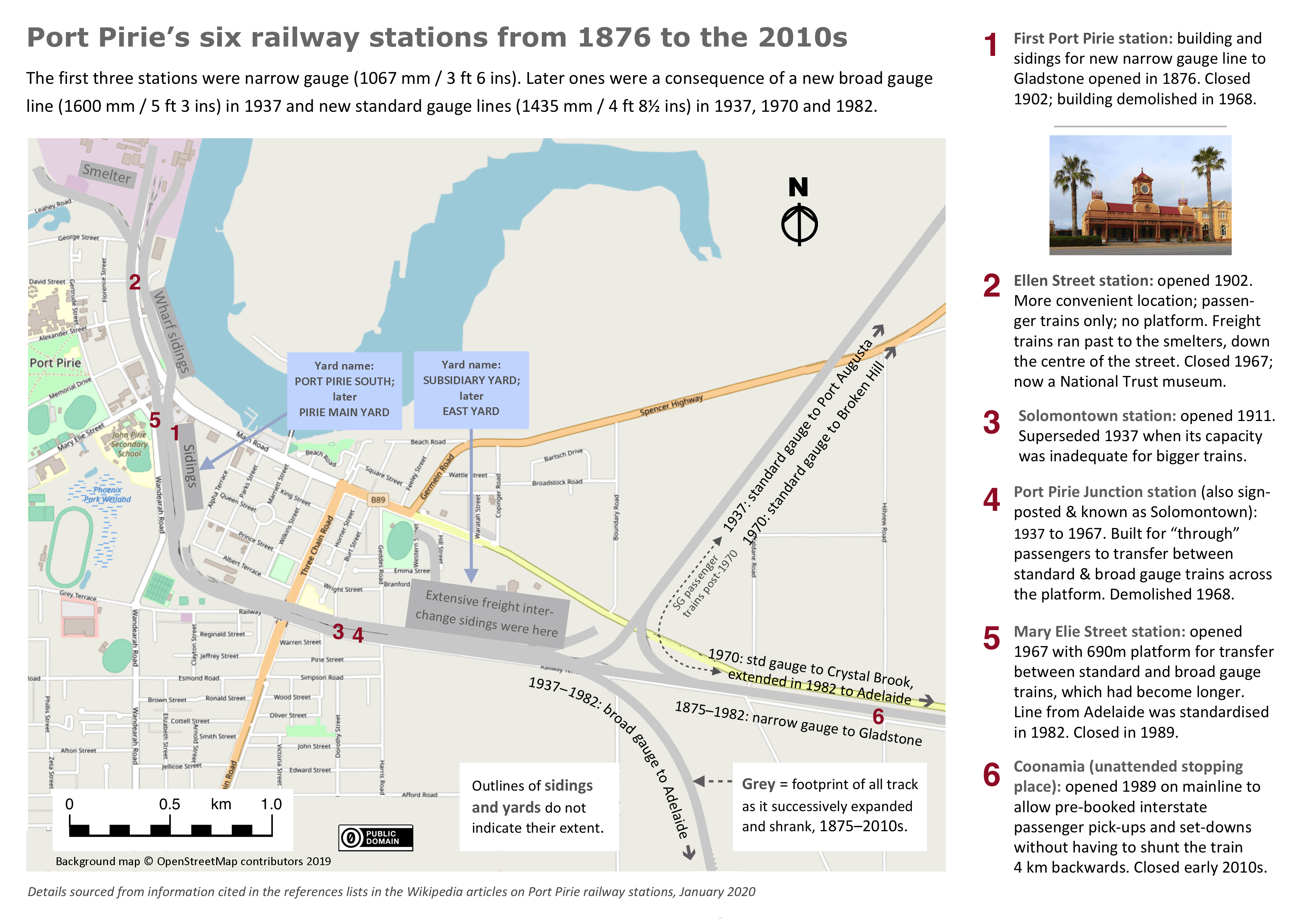
Map including the Mary Elie railway station (5) and the evolution of Port Pirie's three railway gauges (click to enlarge)

At Port Pirie, new standard-gauge sidings and other facilities would be needed to handle the increased freight and passenger traffic enabled by the upgraded line. At that time the city had three passenger stations:

- The first was the 1908-vintage Ellen Street station, on ground level at the end of a dual-gauge (broad and narrow) track that ran down the town's main street; it had become increasingly unpopular on account of congestion and safety concerns. It would close once the new line had been constructed, and would be re-purposed under new ownership.
- The second was Port Pirie Junction station, opened in 1937 to accommodate transfers between a new broad-gauge line to Redhill (thence Adelaide) and a new standard-gauge line to Port Augusta (thence Western Australia). Since its island platform would be far too short for the new Indian Pacific, it would be demolished.
- The third was the small, 1911-vintage Solomontown railway station. With ground-level boarding, it sat alongside the Port Pirie Junction station, its two tracks next to the junction station's two broad gauge tracks. The line it served, the 1878-vintage narrow-gauge route inland to Gladstone and beyond, carried ore trains from Broken Hill, and a railcar ran a service mainly for schoolchildren in the morning and afternoon – the remnant of more frequent services that existed when the railway was the principal means of transport. A broad-gauge track would be laid to take trains from Adelaide to the new station.

== Implementation ==
Although space was limited in Port Pirie's rail yards, standard-gauge and broad-gauge track would replace the narrow-gauge sidings (in new configurations) at Port Pirie South yard. Passengers, parcels and mail would transfer across a new island platform paralleling Wandearah Road; the station entrance would front Mary Elie Street. As before, broad-gauge trains came from Adelaide, to the south, and standard-gauge trains from Port Augusta, to the north; the new element was standard-gauge trains from Broken Hill, to the east.

The configuration of tracks and platform was not easily devised – the South Australian Railways insisted that all freight and passenger traffic from the rail corridor would enter the Port Pirie yard and station. Since there was no room for track to continue on at the northern end, the station would have to be a stub terminal, and without the capacity that would allow passengers to join or leave at the middle or either end of the train, a platform capable of holding an entire passenger train was necessary. The Indian Pacific, on its cross-continent journey due to commence in January 1970, would be much longer than the trains operating before then, namely the Trans-Australian to Western Australia, other standard-gauge services to Whyalla and Woomera, and the East–west Express and other trains to Adelaide. Therefore, the platform would need to be 700 metres (770 yards) long – the longest in Australia.

The new station, from which trains started to run on 12 November 1967, was well received by the town populace; Port Pirie Town Council had been advocating a terminal station there for more than 25 years.

== Facilities ==
Facilities constructed at the station included a waiting room, a refreshment room, a resthouse for train crew, a locomotive stabling depot, diesel fuelling, passenger car water supply, and a turntable. As had occurred at Port Pirie Junction station, a run-around loop on each side permitted locomotives to be detached and turned, and a shunting locomotive took the carriages away to be placed in the sequence needed for the return journey. (Note: Sequence of vehicles: almost invariably, trains from Adelaide to Port Pirie comprised two freight cars immediately behind the locomotive, three steel passenger cars – often two 700 or 600 (second-class) cars and one 780 or 500 (first-class) cars – followed by a 12-wheeled brakevan and (typically) three boxcars with passenger-car bogies. Sometimes, urgent interstate loading was also added behind the locomotive, such as up to three double-deck automotive carriers. When a cafeteria car was present, it was placed between the first-class and second-class cars. Steam locomotives (ending in 1977) were 600, 620, and 520 classes. Diesel locomotives were 900 and, less often, 930 class. In latter years especially, Bluebird railcars provided the service.) The Indian Pacific, which first arrived in Port Pirie on 24 February 1970, was the exception: since Port Pirie was only a pause in its journey, its carriages did not need to be rearranged. However, the entire train needed to be pushed back for 3.6 kilometres (2.2 miles) to return to the mainline and continue on its way – a time-wasting procedure. Much longer operating delays occurred with freight traffic, not only because of the dead-end configuration of the tracks but also because broad-gauge and standard-gauge bogies had to be exchanged on all freight cars that travelled between the South Australian Railways and Commonwealth Railways. A 1971 report stated: "It is expected that in the near future the Australian National Railways Commission will construct a by-pass line around the Port Pirie yard and station to facilitate the fast through movement of freight trains between Sydney and Perth."

In the event, the by-pass line was not laid around the Port Pirie's rail yards and station but on the mainline, where tracks forked out from the yards' exit: north to Port Augusta and south to Crystal Brook, the latter standardised in 1970. The "missing link" between them was completed in 1978 by 600 metres (660 yards) of new track to form the "Coonamia triangle", which not only enabled straight-through traffic but provided a useful means of turning locomotives and trains. (Note: Inwards traffic continued to be lead-zinc-silver ore for the Port Pirie smelter; outwards traffic was mainly bunker fuel for the power station at Broken Hill and sulphuric acid from the smelter.) By then, the Australian National Railways Commission had acquired the South Australian Railways and Commonwealth Railways, so locomotives did not have to be changed at Mary Elie Street when going to and from what had previously been separate systems. The Indian Pacific, however, did not bypass the station until 1986.

== Closure ==
Mary Elie Street station closed on 5 February 1989. It was still considered necessary to provide a facility for Port Pirie passengers of The Ghan, Indian Pacific, and (until June 1991, when it ceased) the Trans-Australian, so a tiny "provisional" stop was simultaneously re-established at Coonamia (see map, station 6), allowing trains to pick up and drop off Port Pirie passengers without having to go through the reversing procedure.

Nine months later, the federal House of Representatives Standing Committee on Transport, Communications and Infrastructure recommended that the Indian Pacific and Trans-Australian, which still ran over three different rail authorities' (Note: Western Australian government, New South Wales government, and Australian National.) tracks, be booked, staffed and controlled by Australian National and be upgraded, refurbished and marketed as luxury train journeys. Further, "Intra-state passengers should only be carried on a stand-by basis, and should rely on alternatives for their primary transport requirements". Australian National acted quickly to discontinue South Australian non-metropolitan intrastate train services, which it achieved in December 1989. (Note: Rail passenger services to Broken Hill and Whyalla were an exception, although they too ceased operating on 2 January 1991. The last Budd railcar to Whyalla ran on 31 December 1990.) Since it served interstate trains, Coonamia remained in use until the 2010s, although climbing down over the ballast shoulder and down to ground level was a difficult, undignified travel experience for the few people who persisted in travelling on a long-distance train within their state.

In 1990, tracks to, and at, the Mary Elie Street platform were lifted. Redevelopment of the northern (ticket office) end as the Port Pirie's tourist information centre, arts centre and public library was completed in 2009. Until 2012, a former Commonwealth Railways GM class locomotive and three 1950s-era passenger cars were stabled at the platform as a public display; one car was a restaurant providing on-the-job training for young people in the hospitality industry with the support of Port Pirie Regional Council and The Foundation for Young Australians.

As of 2021, the platform, its canopy and the block formerly used as a waiting room remained. A miniature railway operated in the garden surrounds. The forecourt served as a bus station.

== Post-closure ==
Following the station's closure, three types of railway operations continued at Port Pirie:

- at the Trafigura smelter and associated wharves: delivery of silver-lead-zinc ore from Broken Hill
- at the Viterra grain silos: delivery of wheat
- at the main and subsidiary yards: long sidings operated by Aurizon.

Preceding stations: Ellen Street, Port Pirie Junction, and Solomontown.

Concurrent station: none.

Subsequent station: Coonamia provisional stopping place.
