= Port Pirie railway station (Ellen Street) =

Former railway station in South Australia, Australia

Port Pirie (Ellen Street) railway station
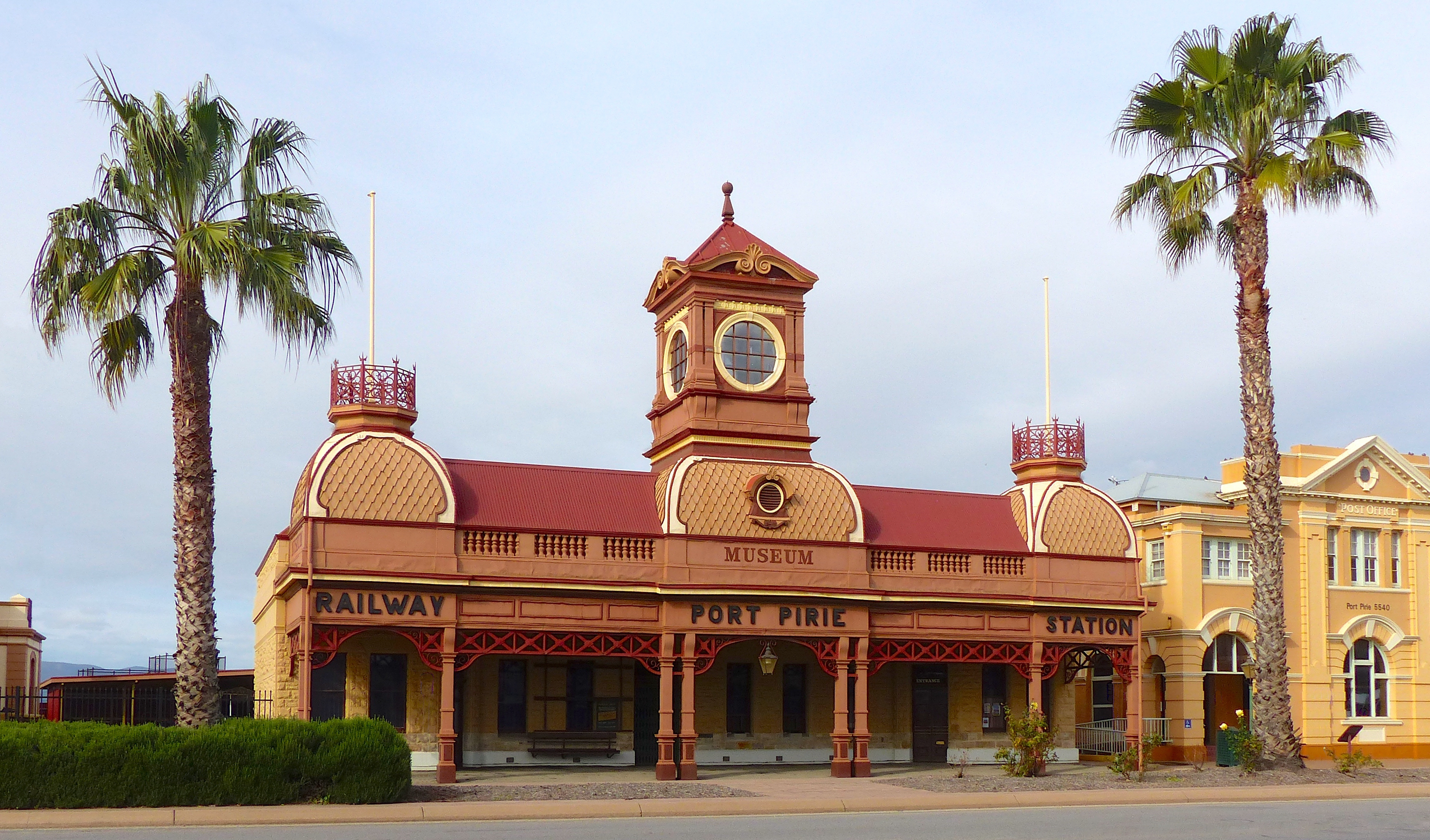
- Ellen Street station building is now a museum owned by the National Trust of South Australia

General information
- Location: 73–77 Ellen Street, Port Pirie, South Australia
- Coordinates: 33°10′33″S 138°00′37″E
- Owner: South Australian Railways until 1967; now National Trust of South Australia
- Lines: Narrow gauge: – Port Pirie to Gladstone, built 1875–1878 – to Petersburg 1881 – to New South Wales border 1888; Broad gauge: – to Redhill 1937
- Gauge: Narrow (1067 mm / 3 ft 6 in); dual after broad gauge (1600 mm / 5 ft 3 in) added in 1937
- Structure: Single-storey Gingerbread / Victorian Pavilion. Materials: stone and brick, with embossed sheet steel facade at front
- Platform: None; ground-level boarding
- Stopping: All passenger trains (terminus for Port Pirie)
- Opened: 1902
- Closed: 1967 (now a National Trust museum)
Location

Ellen Street railway station was the second of six stations that operated successively between 1875 and the early 2010s to serve the rural maritime town (later city) of Port Pirie, 216 km (134 mi) by rail north of Adelaide, South Australia. Soon after construction of the line towards Gladstone began in 1875, an impromptu passenger service commenced. The inaugural station, Port Pirie South, was 800 metres (870 yards) from the centre of the town. Since two tracks had already been laid down the middle of Ellen Street to the wharves, a small corrugated iron shed was erected as a ticket and parcels office. The street-side location was unusual for the South Australian Railways. In 1902, when passenger traffic had increased greatly, a stone building was erected in a striking Victorian Pavilion style. After the tracks were removed in 1967 and the station closed, the building's design assured its retention as a museum of the National Trust of South Australia.

Links to the articles about stations in Port Pirie
	Station	Duration	Gauge		
1	Port Pirie (at what became known as Port Pirie South)	1876 to after 1911	ng		
2	Ellen Street (this article)	1902–1967	ng	bg*	
3	Solomontown	1911–1967	ng		
4	Port Pirie Junction – also signposted as, and known colloquially as, Solomontown	1937–1967	ng	bg	sg
5	Mary Elie Street	1967–1989		bg	sg
6	Coonamia stopping place	1st, 1929 to after 1937; 2nd, 1989–2010s			sg
* In 1937, one of the two narrow-gauge tracks along Ellen Street was made dual-gauge by the addition of broad-gauge rails. Gauges are shown in these colours: narrow, broad and standard.

Port Pirie's six stations and the "multi‑gauge muddle"
At various times during a period of close to 140 years, Port Pirie had six railway stations – never more than two concurrently. During the 45-year period 1937–1982, the city became well known as one of the few locations in the world having three railway gauges. (Note: The gauges were 1067 mm (3 ft 6 in), 1435 mm (4 ft 8 1/2 in), and 1600 mm (5 ft 3 in).) This situation was a result of South Australia's slow transition from lightly constructed narrow gauge to heavy-rail broad gauge (which predominated in the state at the time), then to standard gauge when lines between the mainland state capitals were at last unified. As a consequence, all Port Pirie stations that succeeded the inaugural station of 1876 were either built to accommodate a change of gauge or were affected by one. The timeline, reasons for change, and gauges involved are shown in the following graphic.

Timeline of Port Pirie's six railway stations

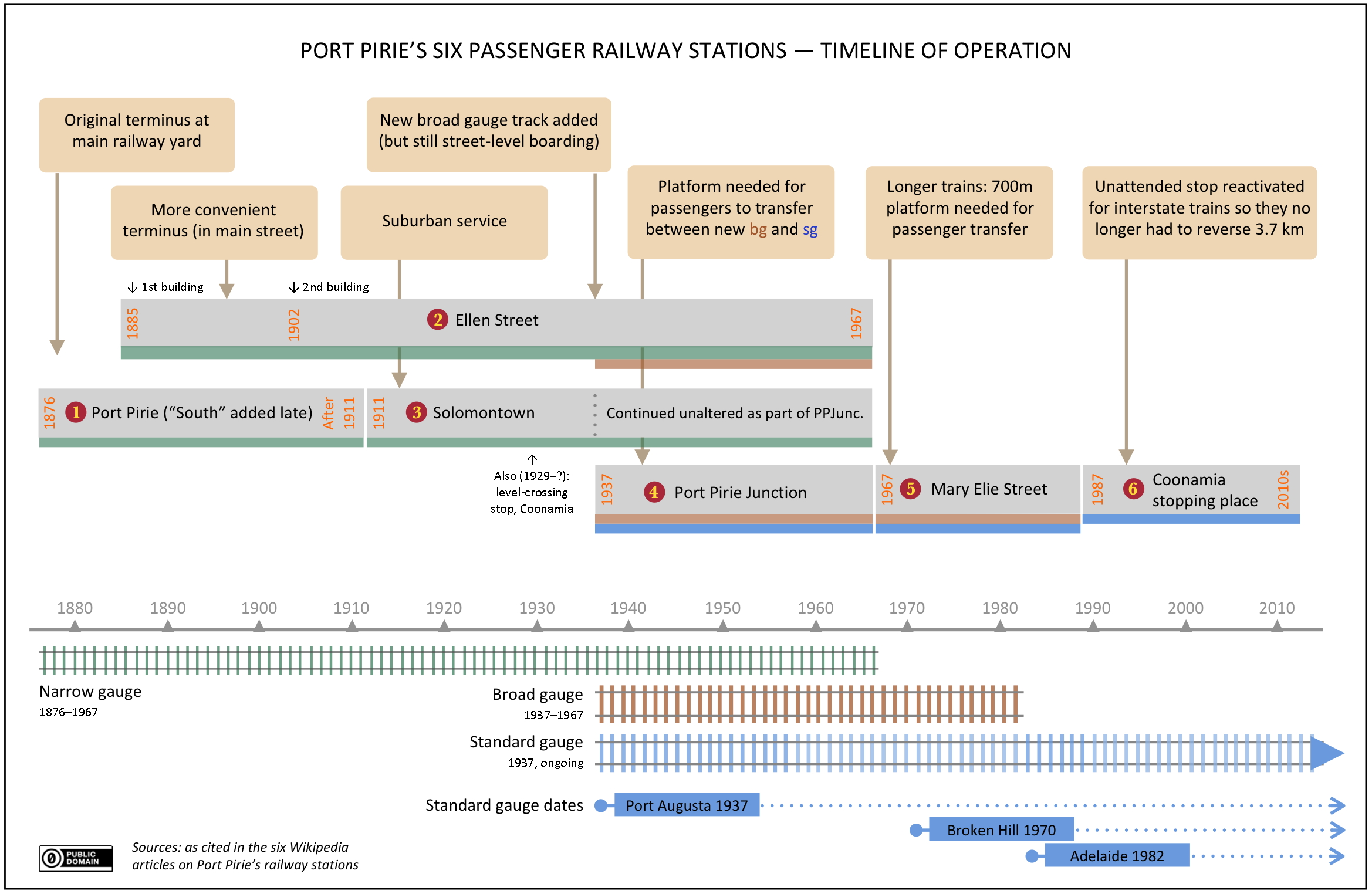

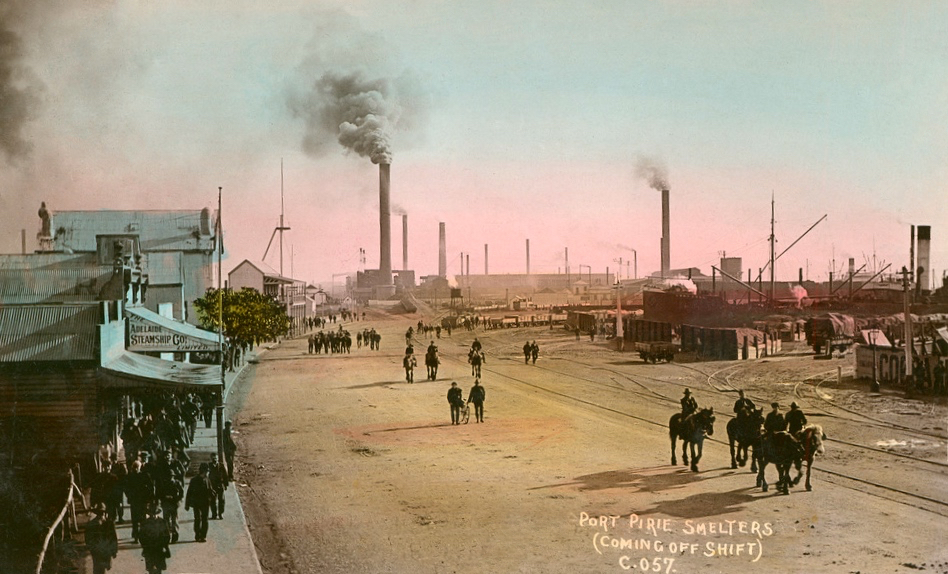
Smelter workers walking down Ellen Street at the end of the night shift about 1904; a double track is in the middle of the street, smelter sidings ahead, wharf sidings to the right

== Placement ==
Some time after the South Australian Railways commenced building a narrow-gauge (1067 mm / 3 ft 6 in) line inland from Port Pirie in 1875, track was extended about 900 metres (985 yards) from where the line had ended, the town's wharves. (Note: The track in Ellen Street went from 33°10′51″S 138°00′42″E to 33°10′26″S 138°00′43″E.) Two-thirds of this track was laid in Ellen Street, Port Pirie's main thoroughfare; the 30.5 metre (100 foot) width of the street provided ample room to lay a pair of tracks down the middle. For the first 13 years the line carried agricultural produce from the hinterland to the wharves for export – the purpose for which the government had built it. However, after 1888 the line also moved large amounts of silver-lead-zinc ore to Port Pirie from the New South Wales border near Broken Hill, 351 km (218 mi) away. Since the smelters had been built next to the northern end of the wharves, Ellen Street saw most of the inwards freight tonnage for Port Pirie, and sulphuric acid (a by-product sold to a fertiliser factory) outwards.

It was into this busy scene that the SAR decided, in late 1900, to introduce an on-street station for passenger services 400 metres (440 yards) short of the smelter gates. Tenders were called in June 1901 but offers were considered too high, so government employees built it. The keys were handed over without ceremony on 4 November 1902. The cost was £3760.

== Construction ==
The station comprised a single-storey building, with a full-length veranda over the footpath, and a smaller building behind. There was none of the infrastructure usually present around stations, since there was no railway yard, only the double tracks going past. The design was in a striking Victorian Pavilion style, uniquely among South Australian Railways buildings. Its structure was stone with some brick, with a facade largely finished with pressed steel panels. The roof was corrugated iron; three domes were finished in large zinc shingles. Stairs were built in the central dome to allow the clocktower above it to be used as a lookout.

== Operation ==
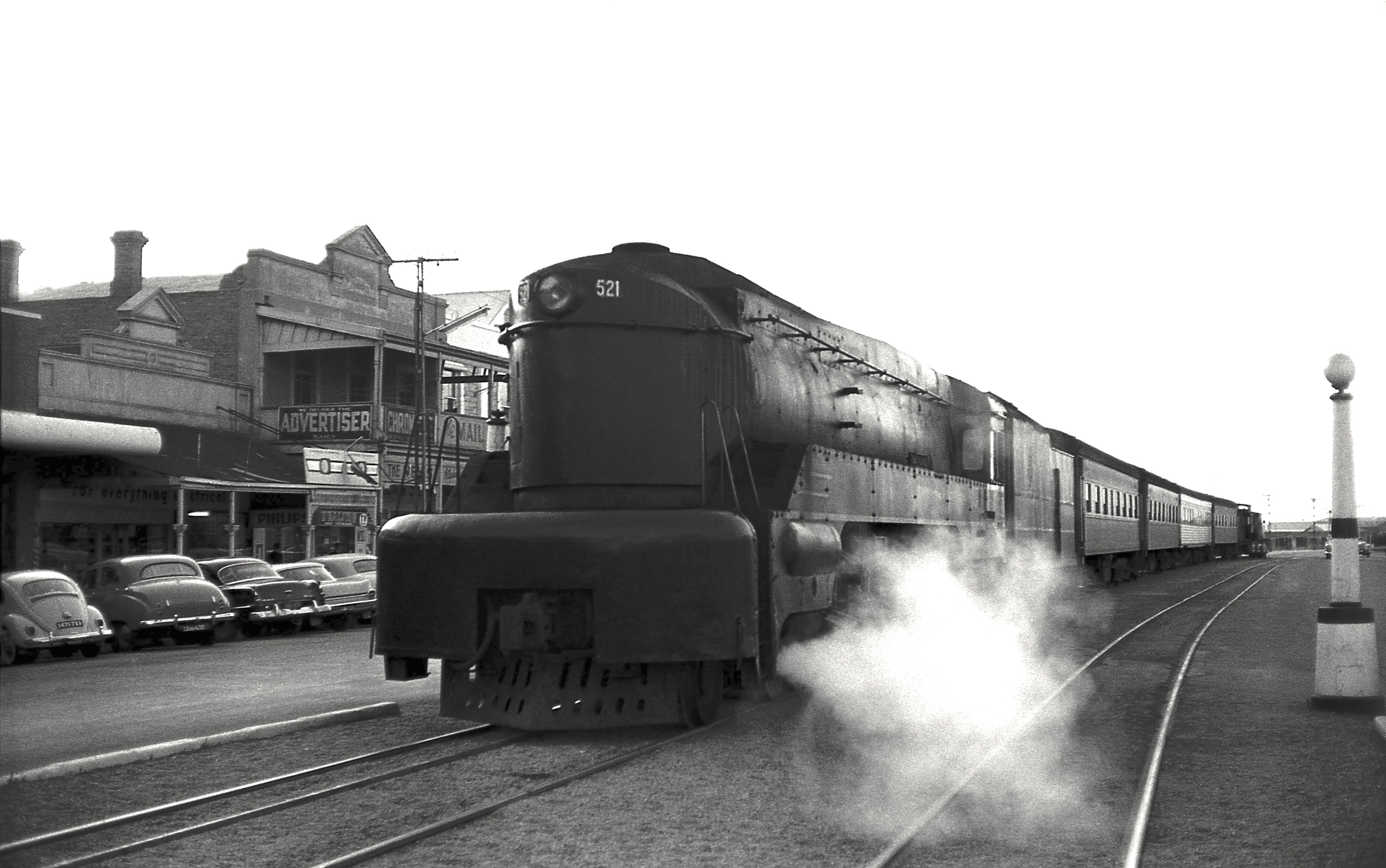
The evening train from Adelaide on the dual-gauge track in Ellen Street, 22 August 1963. The three passenger cars, cafeteria car and long brake van, hauled by a 520, 600 or 620 class locomotive, were typical of the Port Pirie passenger service during the 30 years of broad gauge operation.

As a terminus for passenger trains on a through route to the nearby smelters, the station lacked a turning facility for locomotives. In the days of the narrow gauge, the double track provided a loop allowing locomotives to run around the train to re-couple and haul it back. In 1937, one of the two narrow-gauge tracks in Ellen Street was modified to dual gauge for broad-gauge trains connecting with Adelaide on a new, much more direct route via a line from Redhill. There was no other broad-gauge track to run around the train; it therefore became necessary for the locomotive to push its consist backwards at very slow speed for 920 metres (1010 yards) on the public thoroughfare, under the guidance of the train’s guard. (Note: A typical Port Pirie broad gauge consist comprised, after the locomotive, two boxcars fitted with passenger-service bogies, three or four steel country-services passenger cars, a "long Tom" 12-wheel brake van, in later years a cafeteria car, and often one or more freight cars (especially those with urgent interstate cargo). Steam locomotives were usually a 620 class 4-6-2, a 600 class 4-6-2, or, after their construction in 1943, a 520 class 4-8-4, which were well suited to running at up to 113 km/h (70 mph) over the relatively flat route to Adelaide. Increasingly during the 1960s, 900 class diesels undertook the task.)

== Pressure to close ==
As motor vehicle traffic increased, freight and passenger trains were increasingly regarded as a hindrance in Ellen Street. In 1943, the Port Pirie Council urged the SAR to build a terminal passenger station at Mary Elie Street and remove all trains from Ellen street. The bid was unsuccessful; however, a councillor observed that the solution "did not seem a practical scheme in wartime, but it must be kept alive". In the meantime the council asked the railways to provide a safer area to the north of the station by bituminising between the rails and installing lights: since the brake van – the last vehicle – was positioned in front of the station to allow passengers to retrieve their baggage and other people to collect parcels in the least possible time, passengers from the front (northernmost) carriages had to climb down to street level well beyond from the station building on to a poorly lit surface.

== Closure ==
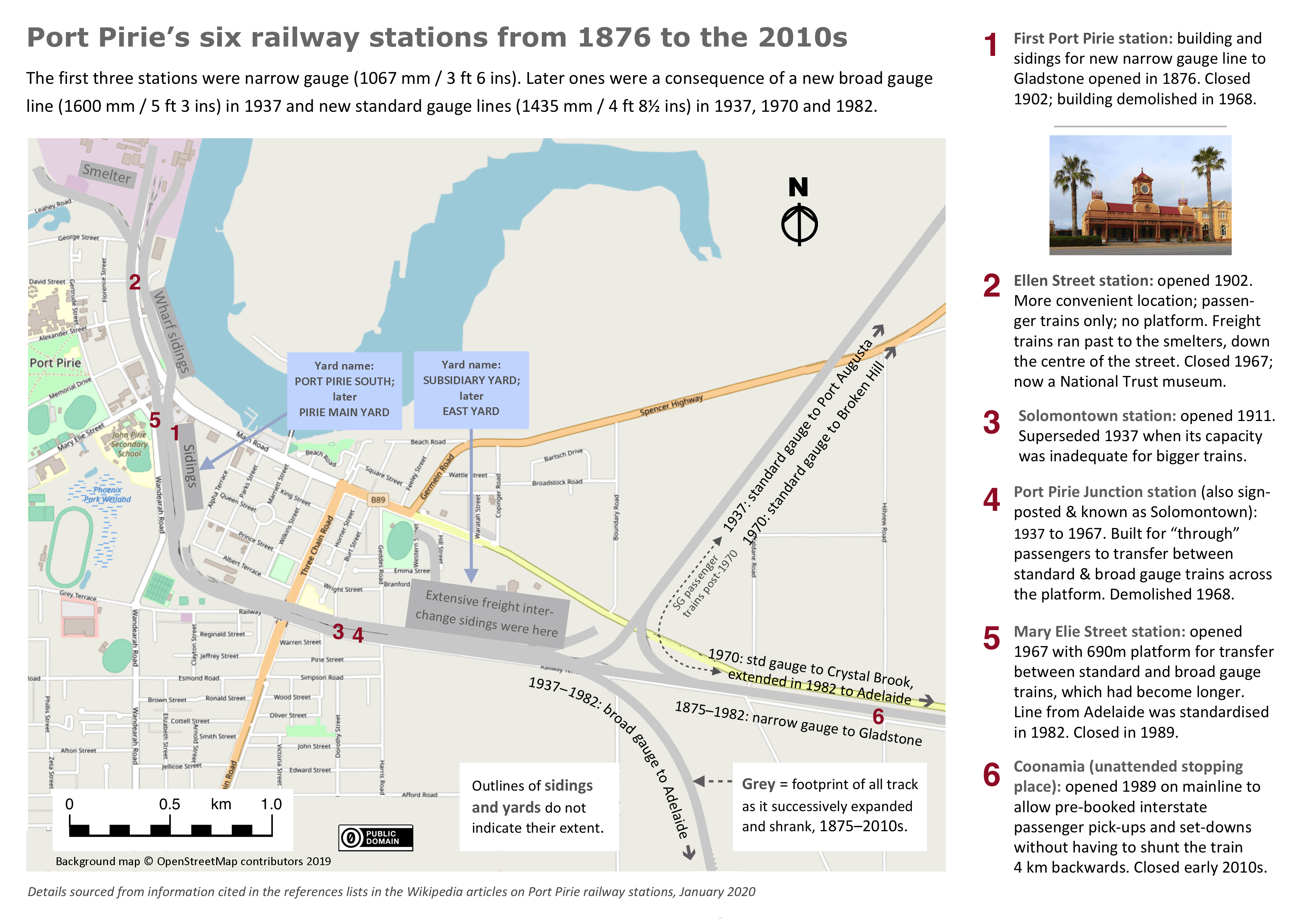
Map including the Ellen Street railway station and the evolution of Port Pirie's three railway gauges (click to enlarge)

Like four of Port Pirie's six railway stations, Ellen Street was superseded as a consequence of lines being constructed to wider gauges eventually entering the city. From 1970, when a standard-gauge line from Sydney via Broken Hill would be completed, a 213-metre (700-foot) platform would be necessary to provide for passengers on far longer trains to transfer across between broad and standard gauge. Unlike the arrival of the broad gauge in 1937, which was solved by adding a third rail down the street, this time a completely new station would be needed. In November 1967, a new station was opened in Mary Elie Street and Ellen Street station was closed – 24 years after the Port Pirie Council had requested it. (Note: The Port Pirie Junction station was closed at the same time.)

After the standard gauge arrived and narrow-gauge operations ceased, all tracks in Ellen Street were pulled up. Since the smelters beyond the station still had to be supplied with ore from Broken Hill, new standard gauge tracks paralleling the street were laid along the narrow corridor between the station building and the wharves.

== Museum ==
Externally unaltered since its erection in 1902, the building retains its prominent place in Port Pirie as a National Trust of South Australia museum, 58–59 years since it closed as a station.

Th building was listed on the National Trust of South Australia's Register of Historic Places in 1977, the now-defunct Register of the National Estate in 1978 and the South Australian Heritage Register in 1981.

Preceding station: Inaugural Port Pirie station, located at Port Pirie South.

Concurrent stations: Solomontown and Port Pirie Junction.

Subsequent station: Mary Elie Street.

== Gallery ==
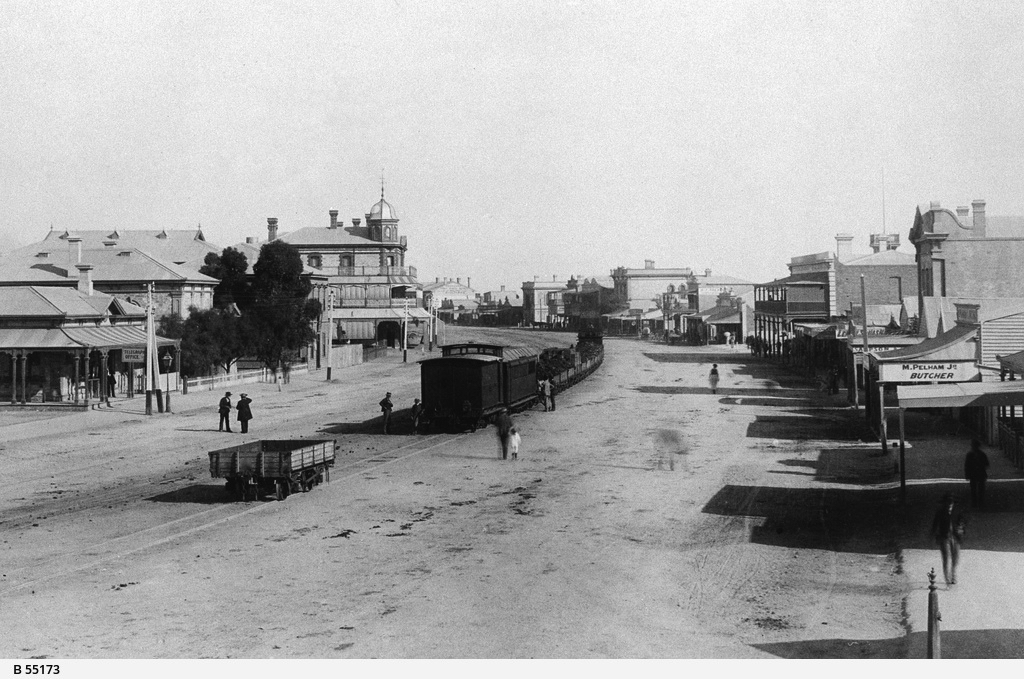

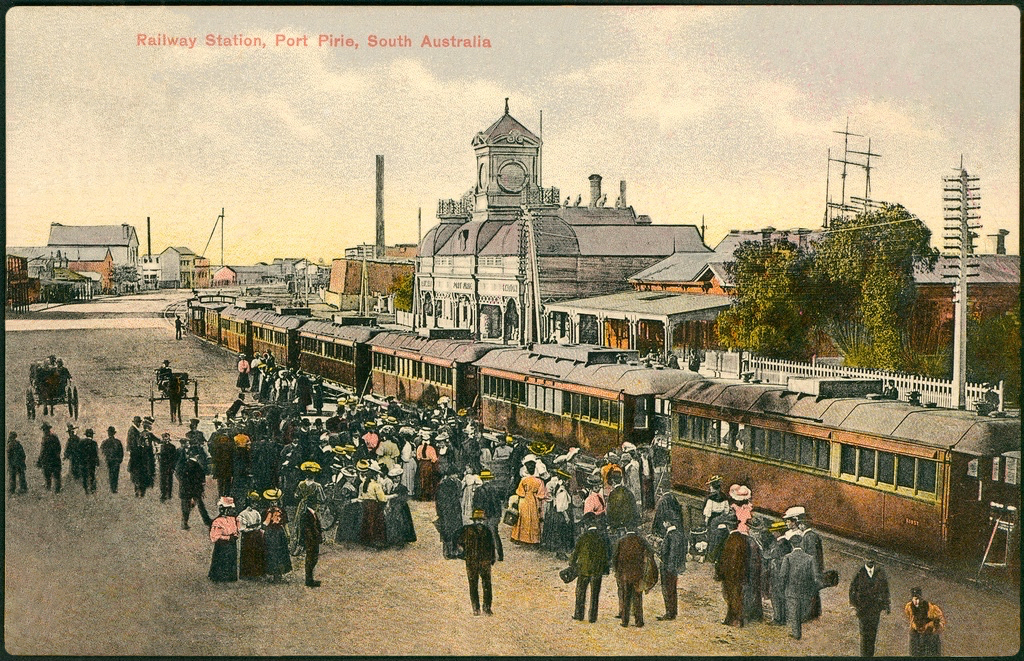

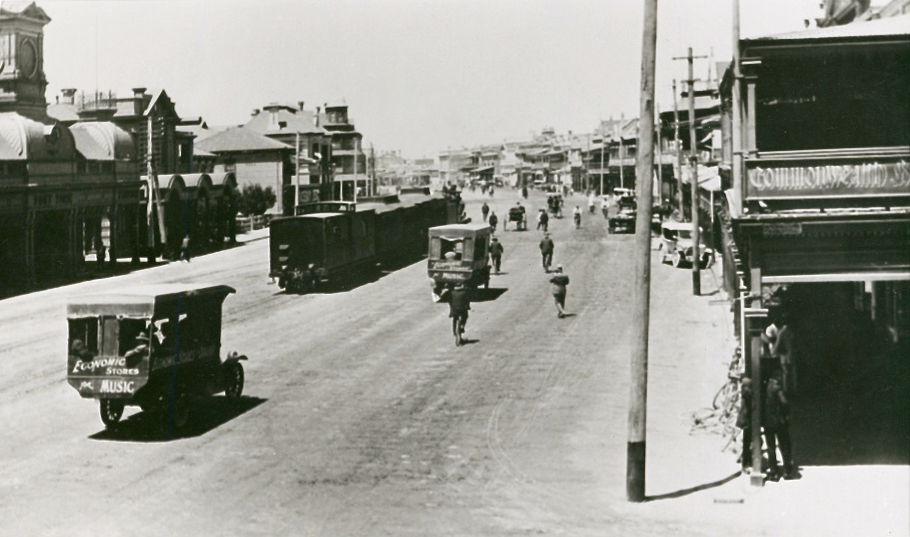

About 1900, there was ample space in Ellen Street for the small, short narrow-gauge trains to share the thoroughfare with pedestrians and horse-drawn vehicles

About 1904, passengers alighting after the long, roundabout journey from Adelaide were greeted outside the new station

About 1920, and motor vehicles (including two open buses in the foreground) were becoming more common

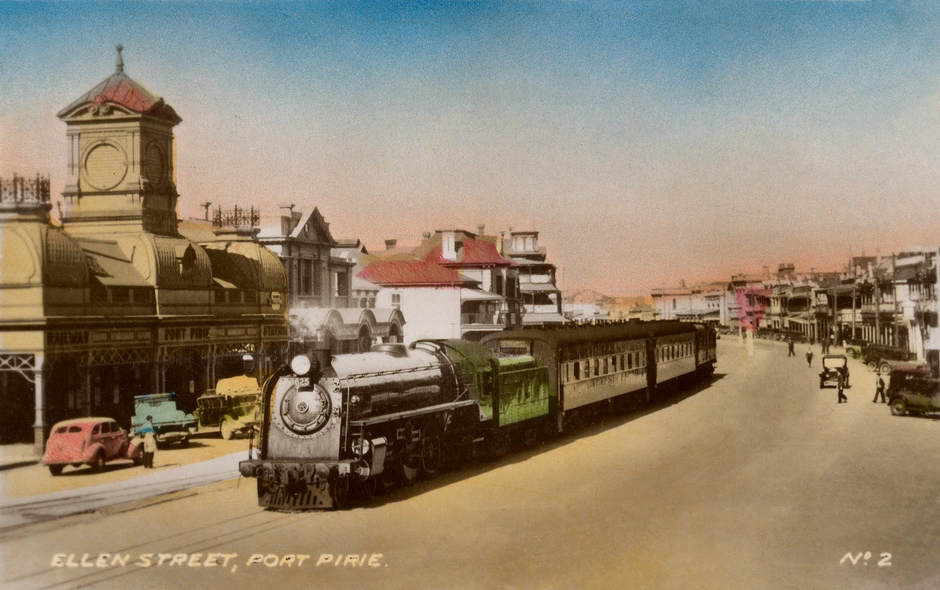

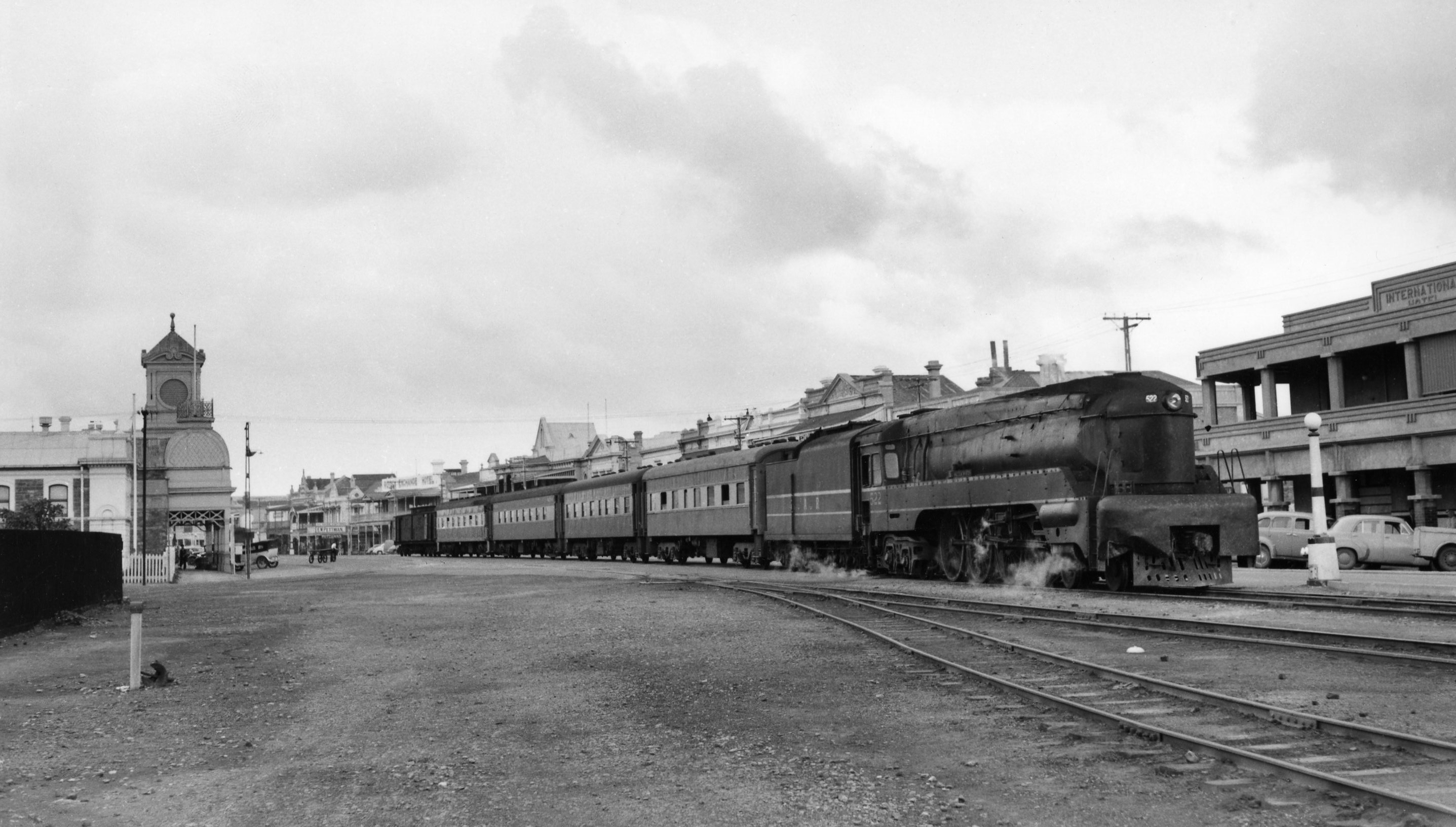

About 1930 and seven years before the broad gauge arrived, trains were hauled by diminutive locomotives such as the Y class

In 1940, a 620 class locomotive and passenger cars that were typical of the broad-gauge years 1937–1967 (and their problematic size and length)

Fast, roller-bearing 520 class locomotives introduced in 1943 were ideal for the easy route to Port Pirie (early 1950s photo)

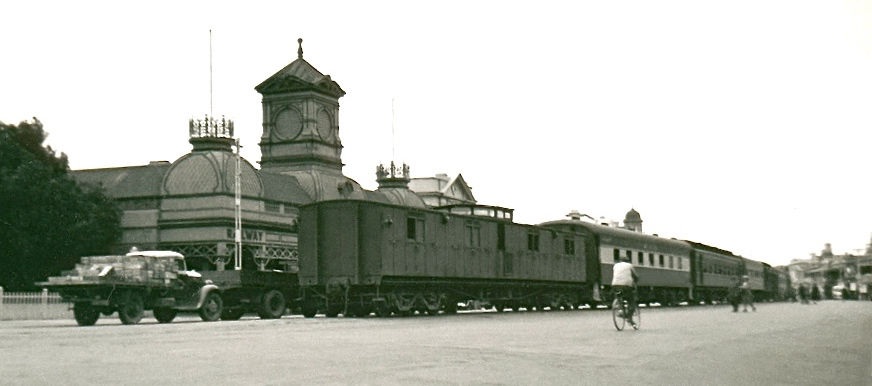

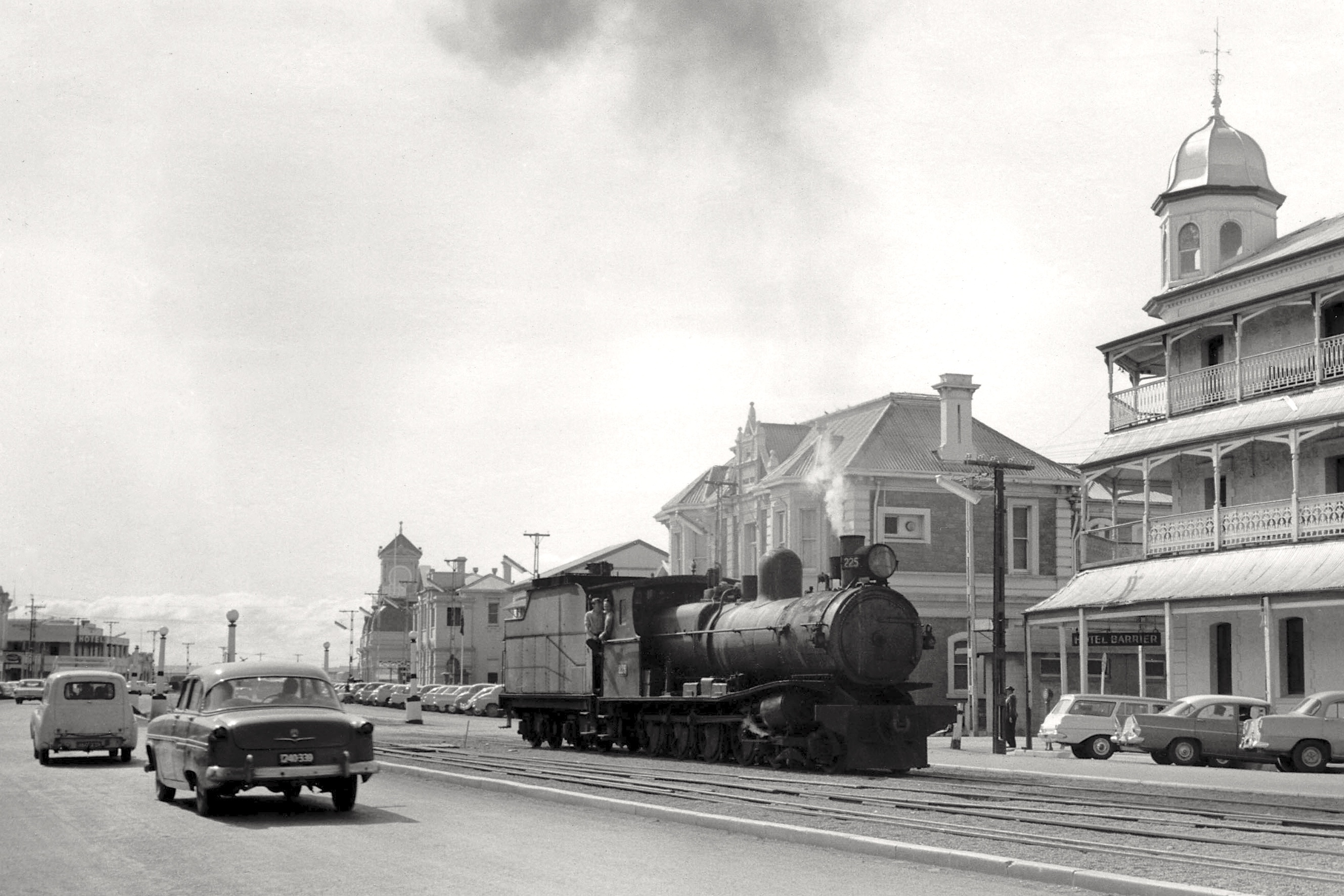

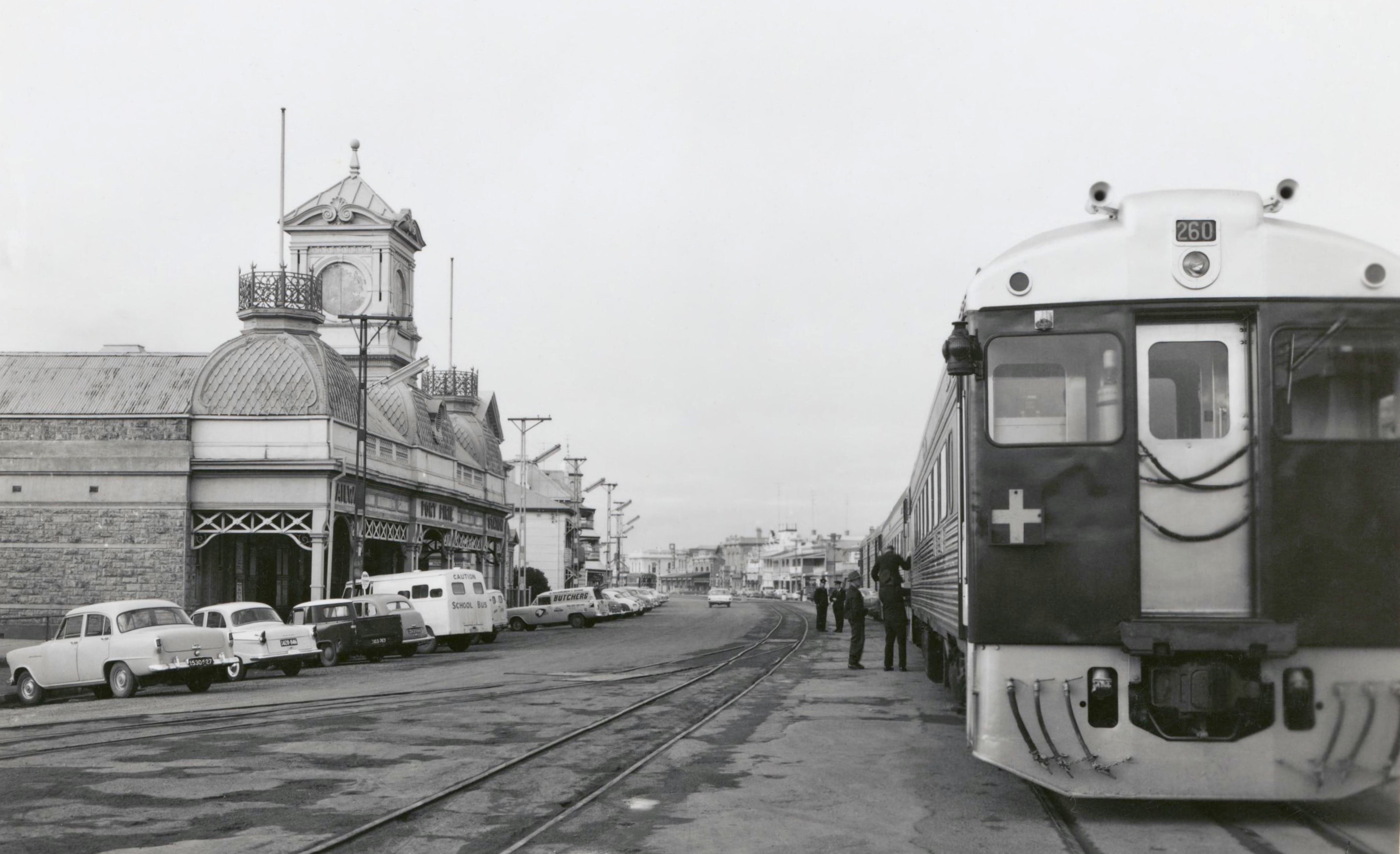

The brake van on passenger trains had to be positioned outside the station building to transfer parcels and boxes into the building or on to road trucks (1947 photo)

Shunting often took place on the narrow-gauge tracks in front of Ellen Street station, as with this T class steam locomotive near the Alexander Street intersection in 1963

In the 1960s, smooth-riding airconditioned Bluebird railcars kept the Adelaide–Port Pirie service popular (1962 photo)

== See also ==
- South Australian Railways
- Rail transport in South Australia
