= Coonamia =

Coonamia can refer to:

- a rural locality 4km east-south-east of the centre of the city of Port Pirie, South Australia
- a former stopping place on the Adelaide–Port Pirie railway line (now part of the Sydney-Perth and Adelaide-Darwin routes) at that locality.
