= Solomontown railway station =

Railway station in South Australia

Solomontown railway station, 1911–1937 (part of Port Pirie Junction station, 1937–1967)
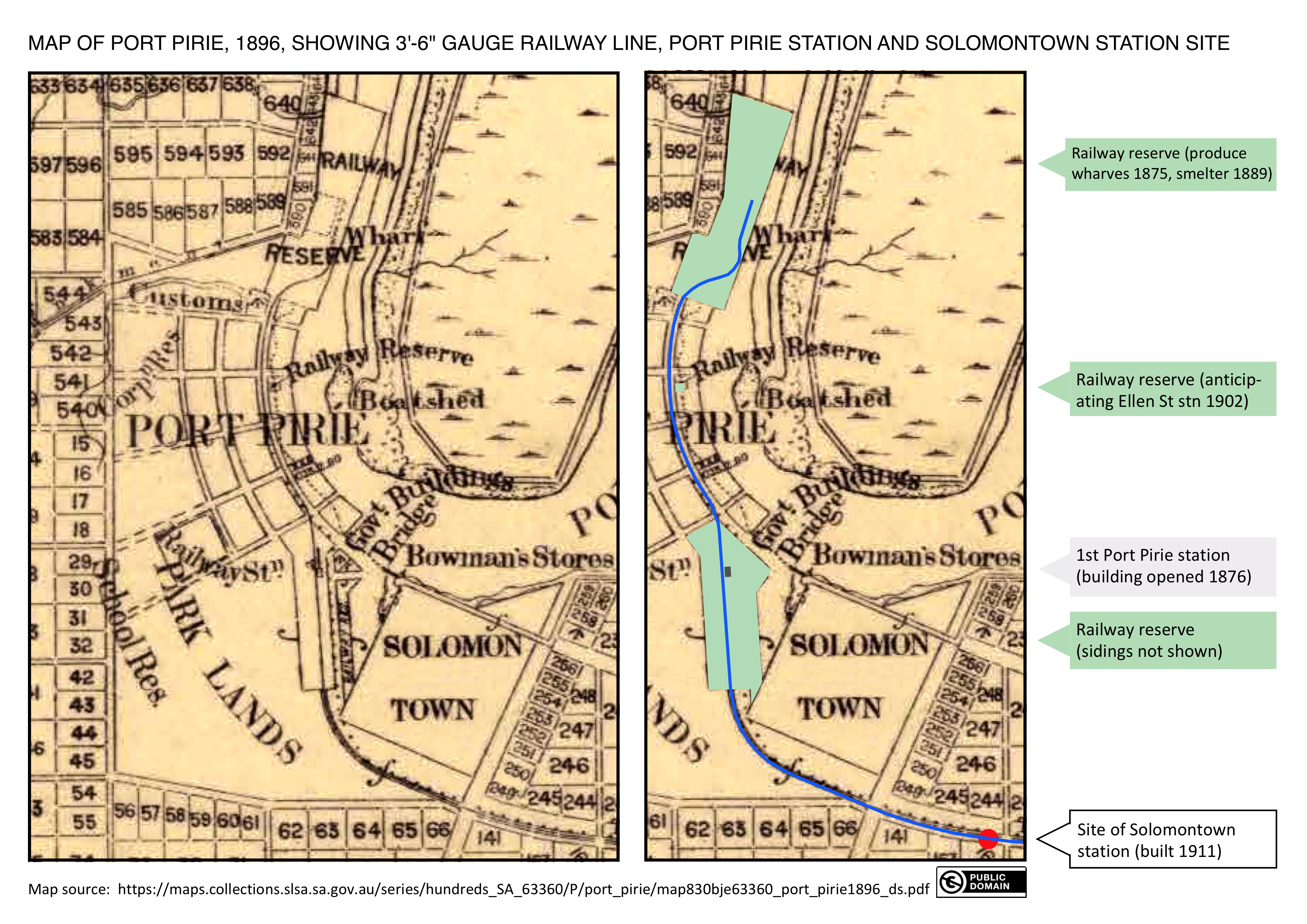
- Map of Port Pirie (part), its railway reserves and the site of Solomontown in 1896 (click to enlarge)

General information
- Location: Off Railway Terrace, between the intersections with Murn Street and Harris Road, Port Pirie, South Australia
- Coordinates: 33°11′29″S 138°01′16″E
- Owner: South Australian Railways
- Line: Port Pirie to New South Wales border
- Gauge: Narrow – 1067 mm (3 ft 6 in)
- Structure: Small wooden waiting shelter
- Platform: None; ground-level boarding
- Staffing: Unattended
- Stopping: Passenger trains on request by the passenger
- Opened: 1911
- Renamed: 1937: became part of Port Pirie Junction railway station
- Closed: 1967 (on cessation of narrow-gauge passenger services)
- Previous station: Port Pirie South
- Concurrent stations: Ellen Street (narrow gauge) and Port Pirie Junction (collocated) and
- Subsequent station: Mary Elie Street
Location

Articles about Port Pirie's six railway stations
	Known as	Duration	Gauge		
1	Port Pirie (name changed to "Port Pirie South" in 1902)	1876 to soon after 1911	ng		
2	Ellen Street	1902–1967	ng	bg*	
3	Solomontown (this article)	1911–1937, then part of Port Pirie Junction until 1967	ng		
4	Port Pirie Junction (also dual-signposted, and known colloquially, as "Solomontown")	1937–1967	ng	bg	sg
5	Mary Elie Street	1967–1989		bg	sg
6	Coonamia	1st, 1929 to after 1937 (marker at level crossing only); 2nd, 1989–2010s			sg
* In 1937, one of the two narrow-gauge tracks along Ellen Street was made dual-gauge as far as the station by the addition of a broad-gauge rail. Track gauges: narrow, broad and standard.

The "multi-gauge muddle" in Port Pirie

At various times during a period of close to 140 years, Port Pirie had six railway stations. During the 45-year period 1937–1982, the city became well known as one of the few locations in the world having three railway gauges. (Note: The gauges were 1067 mm (3 ft 6 in), 1435 mm (4 ft 8 1/2 in), and 1600 mm (5 ft 3 in).) This situation was a result of transitioning from lightly constructed developmental narrow gauge lines to heavier broad gauge (which predominated in the state at the time), then to standard gauge when lines between the mainland state capitals were at last unified. As a consequence, all Port Pirie stations that succeeded the inaugural station of 1876 were either built to accommodate a change of gauge or were affected by one. The timeline, reasons for change, and gauges involved are shown in the following graphic.

Timeline of Port Pirie's six railway stations (click to enlarge):

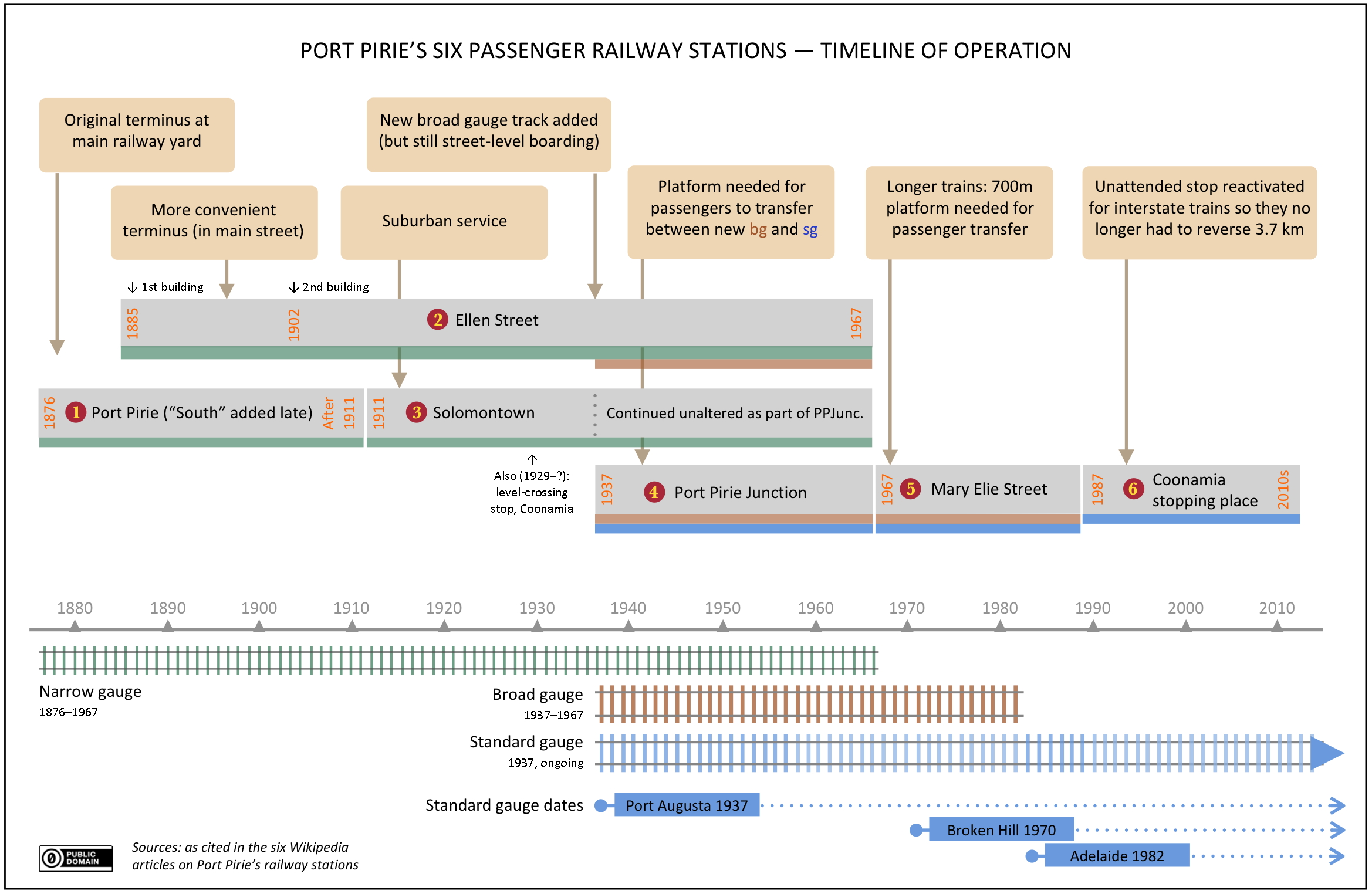

Solomontown railway station was one of a total of six stations that operated at various times between 1876 and the early 2010s to serve the rural maritime town (later city) of Port Pirie, 216 km (134 mi) by rail north of Adelaide, South Australia. It was opened in 1911 as the town's third (and ultimately final) narrow-gauge station. It was closed in 1967, when narrow-gauge passenger services ceased.

== Origins ==
In 1911, the South Australian Railways initiated a local passenger service on the narrow-gauge line leading into the hinterland from Port Pirie's docks. The service operated between the nearby Ellen Street terminus, and via Port Pirie South, 700 metres (770 yards) away to a developing suburban area 1.6 km (0.99 mi) further south. A station was declared at the latter location on Railway Terrace, which at that time was the southern boundary of a lightly inhabited area called Solomontown. Infrastructure consisted of only a signboard and a small wooden shelter; an unpaved compacted earth area for boarding trains from ground level served in lieu of a platform, as at all South Australian narrow-gauge stations. Without staff deployed there, it was officially known as a "provisional stopping place", marked on public timetables with an asterisk and a note stating "Stop, if required, to pick up or set down passengers".

== Multi-gauge era ==
In 1937, two new lines – broad gauge from Adelaide and standard gauge from Port Augusta – reached Port Pirie and the town became well known for having railways built to three gauges. A substantial broad- and standard-gauge station, Port Pirie Junction, was opened immediately opposite the Solomontown stopping place. No new facilities were built to handle narrow-gauge traffic. The "Solomontown" sign was removed, however, because the new Junction station now encompassed Solomontown. Soon afterwards, the Port Pirie Council succeeded in having the South Australian Railways append "Solomontown" under "Port Pirie Junction" on signboards on the new station's platform and signal box. In colloquial use among both residents of Port Pirie and railway employees, "Solomontown" was applied to the new station as well as the old one.

By 1967, long-distance broad-gauge and standard-gauge passenger trains had become much longer than the Port Pirie Junction platforms, necessitating a new station at Mary Elie Street, 1.6 km (1.0 mi) away. The following year, the Junction station was demolished and the track surrounding it, including that of the narrow-gauge stop, was reconfigured, consigning the infrastructure to history.

Previous stations: Port Pirie South; Ellen Street.

Concurrent stations: Port Pirie Junction (collocated with Solomontown); Ellen Street.

Subsequent station: Mary Elie Street.

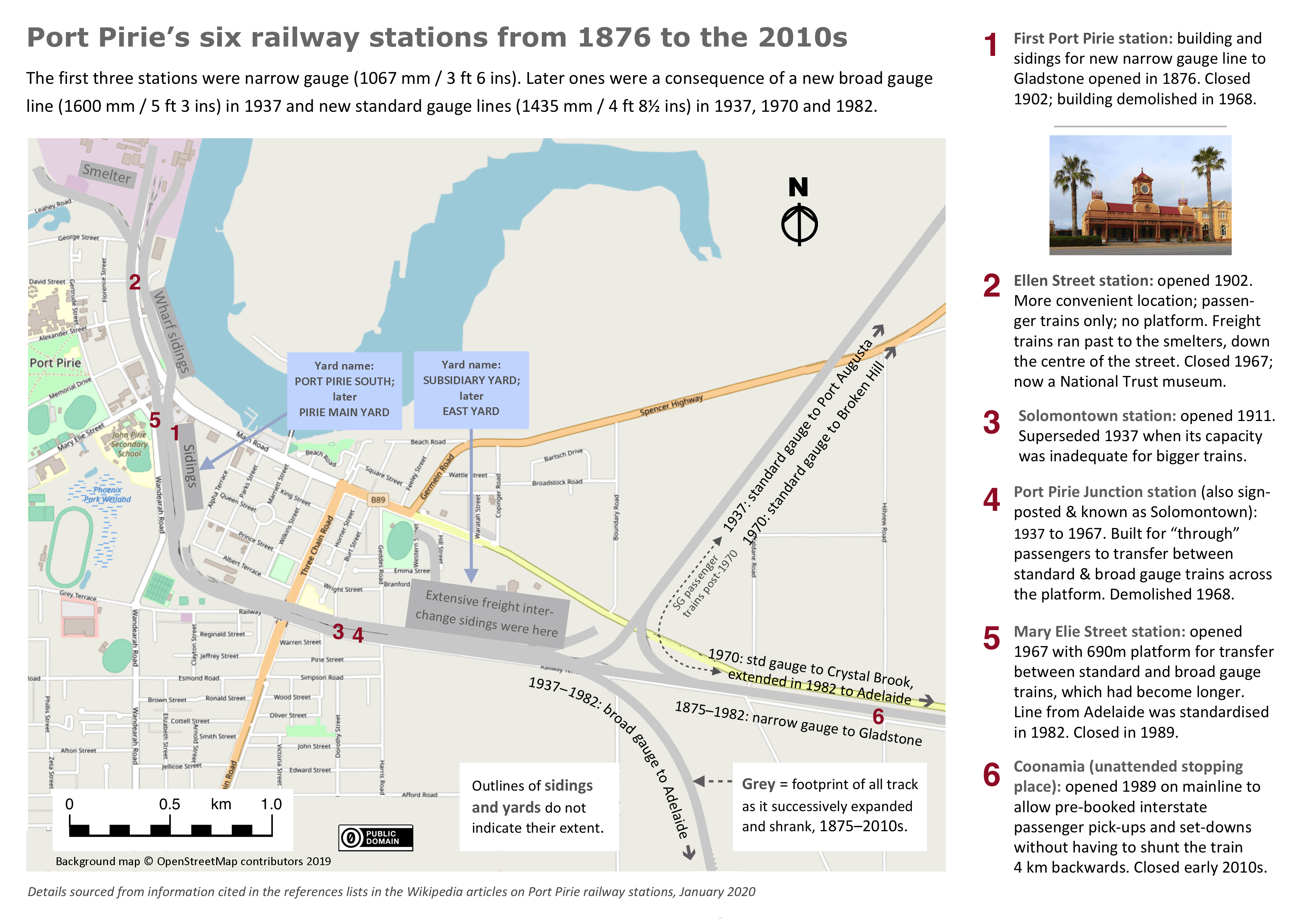

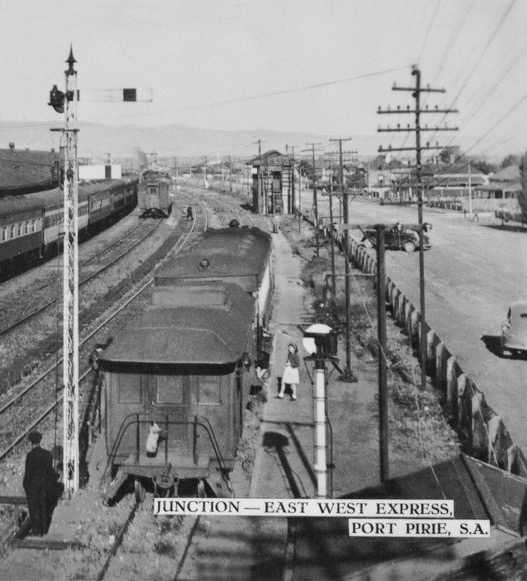

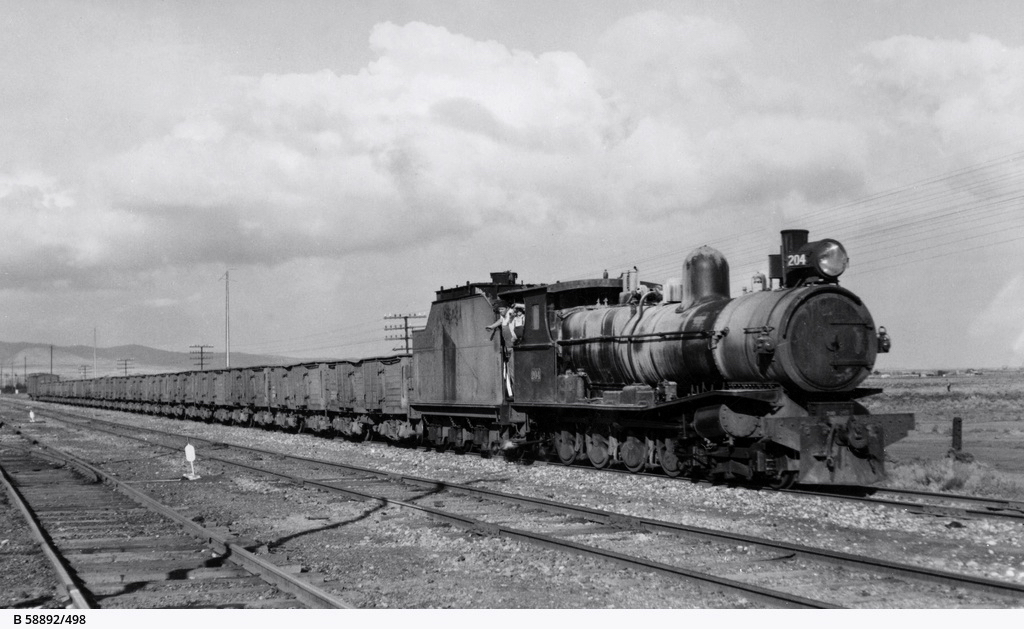

Solomontown station was the third of six built in Port Pirie, where eventually three railway gauges converged on the town. The sequence of construction is shown in the map (click to enlarge).

About 1950, looking east, the Solomontown "provisional stopping place", comprising a waiting shed and the hard standing in the centre of the photo. It had provided for passengers on narrow-gauge trains (such as this railcar-hauled school train to Gladstone) for four decades.

Silver-lead-zinc ore trains were the most frequent on the narrow-gauge line to the New South Wales border. About 1951 this train, hauled by oil-fired locomotive T204, was about to pass Solomontown

== See also ==
- South Australian Railways
- Transport in South Australia
