= Port Pirie South railway station =

Former railway station in South Australia

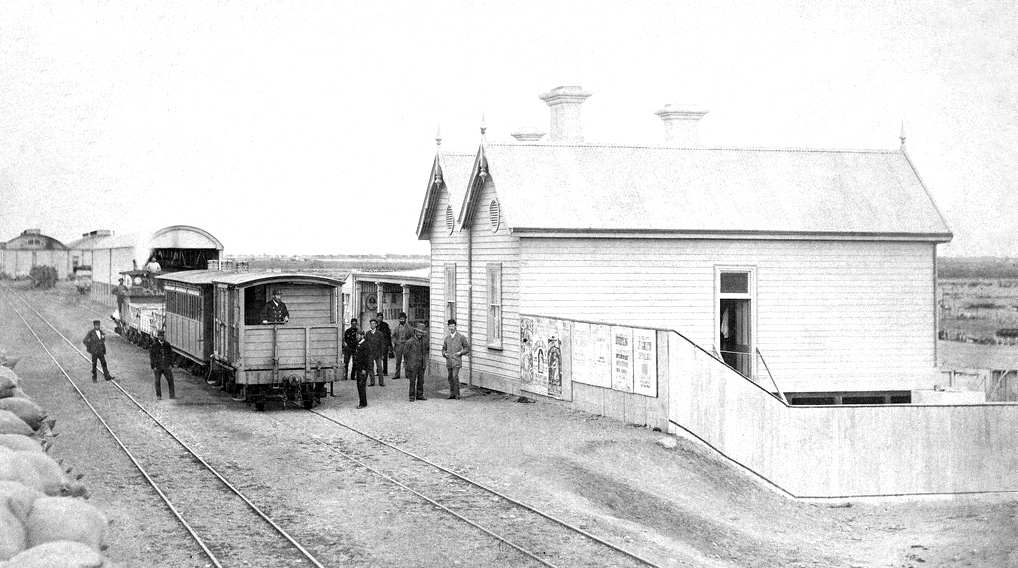
- Inaugural "Port Pirie" railway station, located at Port Pirie South (1876 to 1910s)

General information
- Location: Near Mary Elie Street, between Main Road and Wandearah Road, Port Pirie, South Australia
- Coordinates: 33°10′55″S 138°00′43″E
- Owner: South Australian Railways
- Lines: Port Pirie to Gladstone, built 1875–1878 – to Petersburg 1881 – to New South Wales border 1888
- Gauge: Narrow – 1067 mm / 3 ft 6 in
- Structure: Early South Australian Railways Class 1 wooden style
- Platform: None; ground-level boarding
- Staffing: Station master plus numerous other employees
- Stopping: All passenger trains
- Opened: 1876
- Closed: After 1911 (demolished 1968)
- Concurrent station: Ellen Street and for a few years, Solomontown
- Successor station: Mary Elie Street
Location

Articles about Port Pirie's six railway stations
	Known as	Duration	Gauge		
1	This station (name changed to "Port Pirie South" in 1902)	1876 to soon after 1911	ng		
2	Ellen Street	1902–1967	ng	bg*	
3	Solomontown	1911–1937	ng		
4	Port Pirie Junction (also dual-signposted, and known colloquially, as "Solomontown")	1937–1967	ng	bg	sg
5	Mary Elie Street	1967–1989		bg	sg
6	Coonamia	1st, 1929 to after 1937 (marker at level crossing only); 2nd, 1989–2010s			sg
* In 1937, one of the two narrow-gauge tracks along Ellen Street was made dual-gauge as far as the station by the addition of a broad-gauge rail. Track gauges: narrow, broad and standard.

The "multi-gauge muddle" in Port Pirie

At various times during a period of close to 140 years, Port Pirie had six railway stations. During the 45-year period 1937–1982, the city became well known as one of the few locations in the world having three railway gauges. (Note: The gauges were 1067 mm (3 ft 6 in), 1435 mm (4 ft 8½ in), and 1600 mm (5 ft 3 in).) This situation was a result of transitioning from lightly constructed developmental narrow gauge lines to heavier broad gauge (which predominated in the state at the time), then to standard gauge when lines between the mainland state capitals were at last unified. As a consequence, all Port Pirie stations that succeeded the inaugural station of 1876 were either built to accommodate a change of gauge or were affected by one. The timeline, reasons for change, and gauges involved are shown in the following graphic.

Timeline of Port Pirie's six railway stations (click to enlarge):

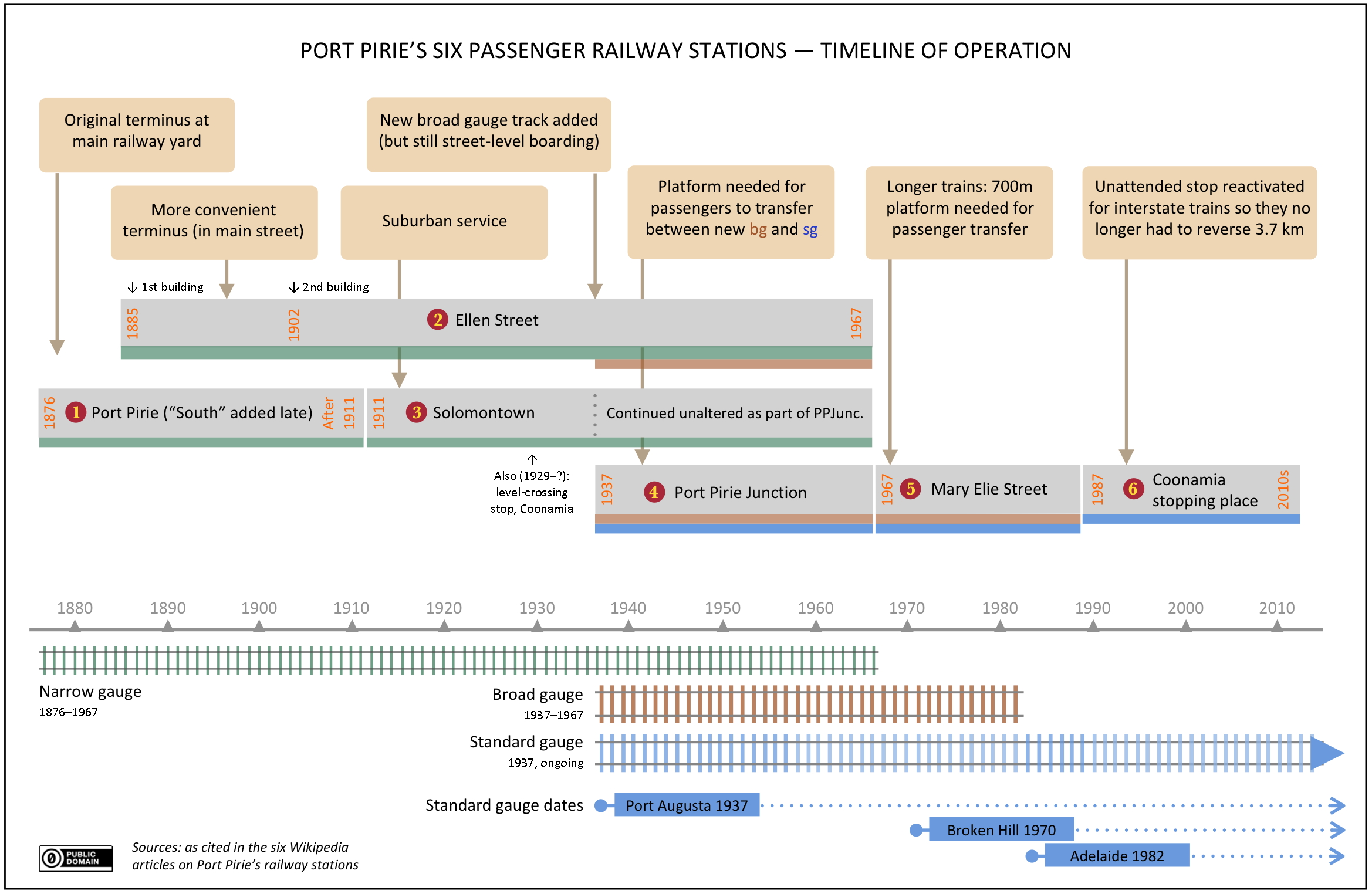

The railway station located at Port Pirie South bore the name "Port Pirie" from when it was built in 1876 until it was superseded in 1902 by a passenger station in the centre of Port Pirie. The new station was then assigned the name "Port Pirie railway station" and the original was named Port Pirie South railway station, in keeping with the naming of the adjacent Port Pirie South railway yards.

The wooden station building was opened in 1876 at the terminus of the lightly engineered, 1067 mm (3 ft 6 in) gauge railway from Port Pirie – then a town of fewer than 1,000 people – into the rich agricultural hinterland of the Mid North. The need was to transport agricultural produce more cheaply to the port for export, mainly to Great Britain, in sailing ships. The following year, Port Pirie's inaugural railway station was opened. A modest weatherboard building, it was placed at the north end of the railway yards, about 250 metres (270 yards) from the town's wharves. In addition to the building there were two locomotive sheds and a freight shed, coaling and watering facilities, a passing loop in front of the station building, and a few sidings.

Since the railway was such an advance over horse-drawn wagons or bullock drays over unmade roads, traffic soon increased significantly, especially when in the following year the line reached the nearest town in the hinterland – Gladstone, 52 km (32 mi) east of the port – and, more so, Petersburg, (Note: As a result of anti-German sentiment during the First World War, Petersburg was renamed Peterborough in 1917.) a further 64 km (40 mi) east, in 1881. In the years that followed, more trackage was constructed in the yards to accommodate the increased tonnages and variety of freight. The yards eventually became known as "Port Pirie South Yard", then many years later, "Pirie Main Yard". (Note: Note that the title of the publication contains "mixed gauge" but it is referenced as "multi gauge".)

In 1884, the South Australian Government, quickly realising the importance of new silver-lead-zinc discoveries at Broken Hill, passed an Act authorising a railway extending from the Port Pirie line at Petersburg to the New South Wales border at Cockburn – thus forestalling the prospect of the New South Wales Government building a line to a port in that state. (Note: Inter-colonial rivalry was exemplified by the New South Wales Government's refusal to allow the South Australian Government to operate a railway over the border to Broken Hill, 58-kilometre (36 mi)-long away. This obstacle was overcome only by the incorporation of a company to undertake the task.) The railway reached Cockburn, 351 km (218 mi) from Port Pirie, in 1888. The first Port Pirie furnaces began operating in 1889 and the smelter was completed in 1892, (Note: The smelter at Broken Hill was dismantled in 1897.) relegating a competing proposal from Port Adelaide to history. The line soon became the most important of the South Australian Railways. It was a vast improvement in the economics and efficiency of transporting the ore compared with the bullock drays used previously. The ore traffic and the smelter were to have a profound effect on the town, turning it from a bustling small port into an industrial city.

Since the 1880s, passenger trains had run 750 metres (800 yards) beyond Port Pirie South to a more convenient locality in Ellen Street, in the centre of the town, where tracks had been laid for traffic to and from the smelters, located a further 400 metres (440 yards) north. A small tin-shed ticket office was erected. In 1902, a new, flamboyant stone building in the Victorian Pavilion style replaced the shed. Ellen Street station operated concurrently with Port Pirie South station until the latter was closed following the opening of the Solomontown station in 1911.

Subsequent station (concurrent 1902–1911): Ellen Street.

Gallery: Port Pirie South railway station
In 1967, 91 years after its construction, everything around the original Port Pirie South building had changed, including new standard-gauge tracks serving the just-opened Mary Elie Street station (left).	Track layout of Port Pirie South in the 1920s – all narrow-gauge. Broad and standard gauges were added in 1937.
In this circa 1910 photo of Port Pirie South yard, looking north, the station building is beyond the two conjoined bow-roofed locomotive sheds. Ore trains destined for the smelters in the distance, to the north, head down the middle.	The sequence in which Port Pirie's six railway stations were built. Port Pirie South – the original "Port Pirie" station – is no. 1 (click to enlarge)

== See also ==
- South Australian Railways
- Transport in South Australia
