= South Australian Railways 900 class =

Class of Australian diesel-electric locomotives

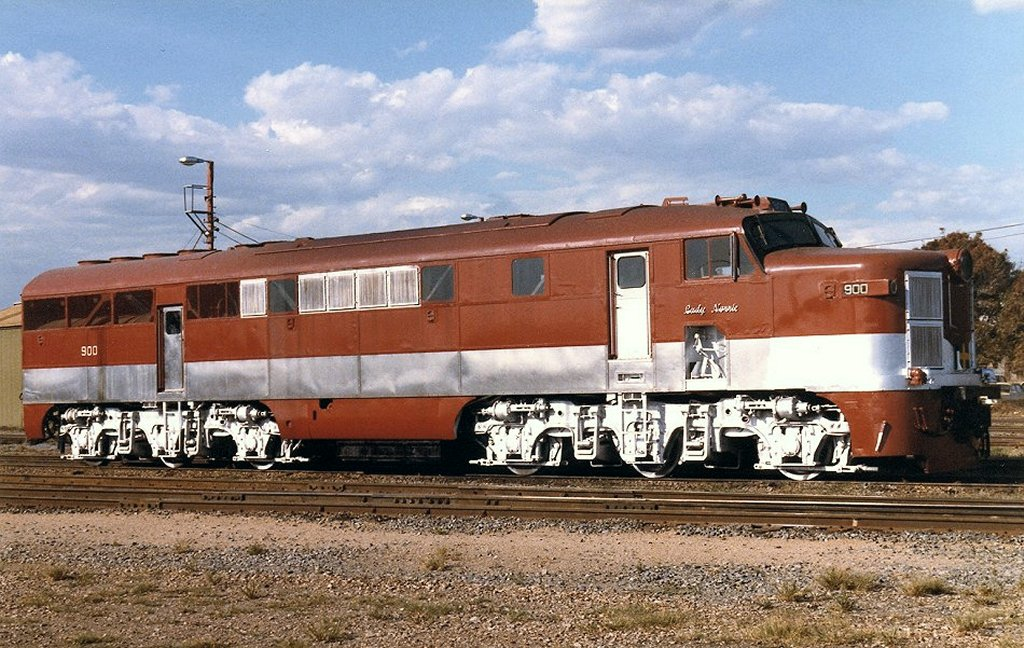
- 900 Lady Norrie
Type and origin
- Power type: Diesel-electric
- Builder: Islington Railway Workshops
- Build date: 1951-1953
- Total produced: 10
Specifications
- Configuration
  - UIC: A1A-A1A
- Gauge: 1,600 mm (5 ft 3 in)
- Wheel diameter: 3 ft 6 in (1,067 mm)
- Wheelbase: 52 ft 2 in (15,900 mm) total, 16 ft 2 in (4,928 mm) bogie
- Length: 63 ft 4 in (19,304 mm) over headstocks, 66 ft 2 in (20,168 mm) over coupling faces
- Width: 9 ft 7 1/4 in (2,927 mm)
- Height: 13 ft 9 in (4,191 mm)
- Axle load: 21 long tons (21.3 t; 23.5 short tons)
- Adhesive weight: 84 long tons (85.3 t; 94.1 short tons)
- Loco weight: 121 long tons (122.9 t; 135.5 short tons)
- Fuel type: Diesel
- Fuel capacity: 1,000 imp gal (4,500 L)
- Prime mover: English Electric 16SVT Mk I
- RPM range: 450–750 rpm
- Engine type: Four-stroke, 2 valves per cylinder
- Aspiration: Turbocharged
- Generator: English Electric 822 type
- Traction motors: 4 type 523A air cooled
- Cylinders: 16 Vee
- Cylinder size: 10 in × 12 in (254 mm × 305 mm)
- MU working: X 3
- Loco brake: Westinghouse Compressed Air, and Electric Dynamic
Performance figures
- Maximum speed: 75 miles per hour (121 km/h)
- Power output: 1,760 hp (1,310 kW) gross, 1,600 hp (1,190 kW) net
- Tractive effort
  - Starting: 56,000 lbf (249.1 kN)
  - Continuous: 34,000 lbf (151.2 kN) at 15 mph (20 km/h)
Career
- Operators: South Australian Railways
- Number in class: 10
- Numbers: 900-909
- Nicknames: Magnificent Beasts
- First run: 10 September 1951
- Last run: 18 June 1985
- Preserved: 900, 907, 909
- Disposition: 3 preserved, 7 scrapped

The 900 class were a class of diesel locomotives built by Islington Railway Workshops for the South Australian Railways between 1951 and 1953.

== History ==
The 900 class were the first mainline diesels operated by the South Australian Railways. Ten were built at Islington Railway Workshops to replace steam locomotives on the heavily graded Mount Lofty Ranges. They operated both heavy freight trains and passenger services including The Overland. After the arrival of more powerful diesel, they were concentrated on the easier-graded lines from Adelaide to Port Pirie and Peterborough.

In March 1978, all were included in the transfer of the South Australian Railways to Australian National. Withdrawals commenced in May 1979 with the last two withdrawn on 18 June 1985 after operating a cement train from Angaston to Dry Creek. Three have been preserved with the other seven scrapped.

== Preserved ==
Three units have been preserved:

- 900 Lady Norrie resides at the National Railway Museum, Port Adelaide
- 907 resides in Tailem Bend under private ownership in derelict condition
- 909 resides in Tailem Bend under private ownership being restored
