= Coonamia railway station =

Former railway station in South Australia

Coonamia "provisional stopping place"
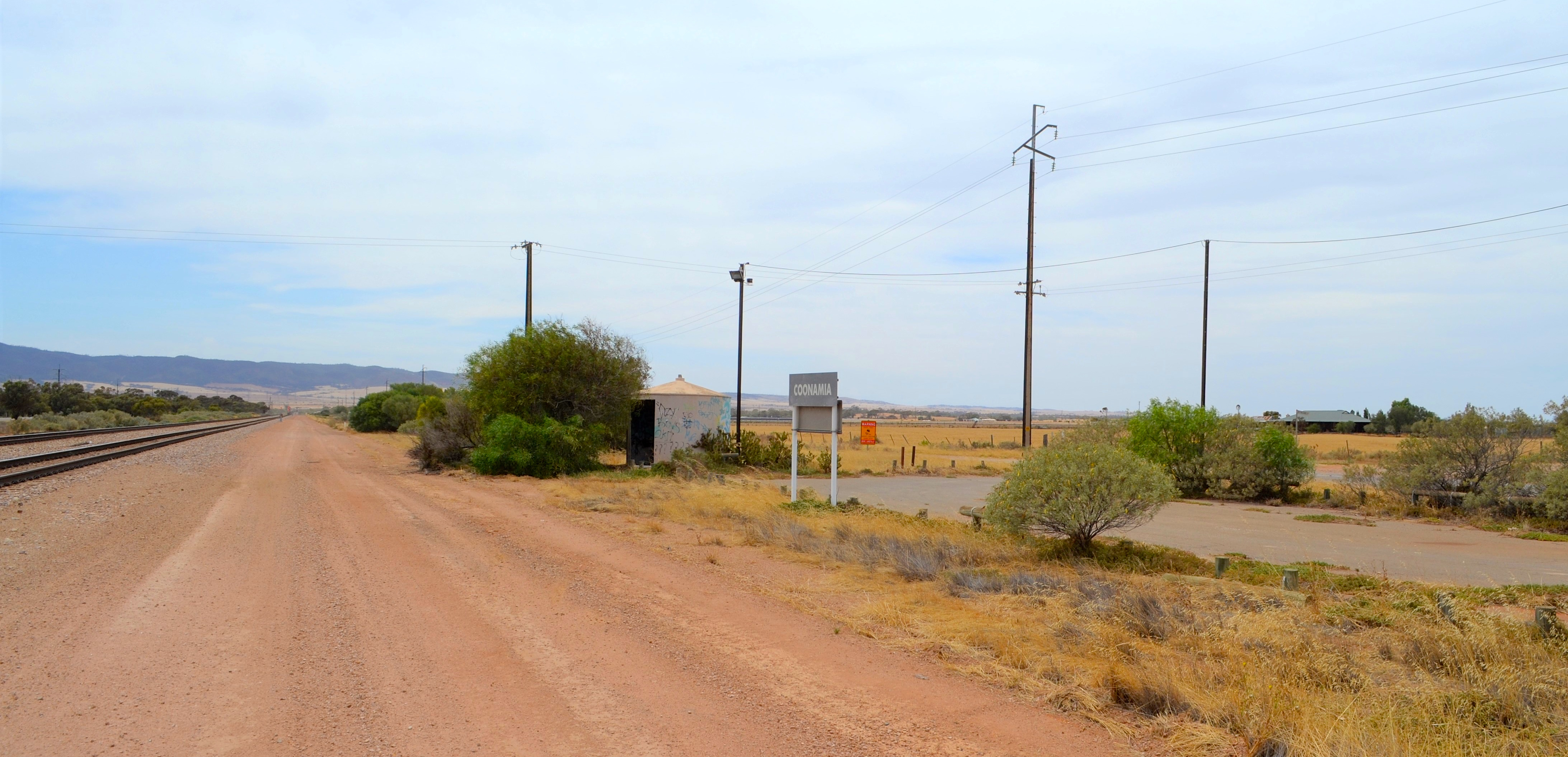
- Site of the former Coonamia provisional stopping place in 2020. Trains no longer stopped there; the sign marked the boundary of two train control districts. The round structure houses railway signalling and communication equipment.

General information
- Location: Railway Terrace South (corner of Hillview Road), Coonamia, near Port Pirie, South Australia
- Coordinates: 33°11′42″S 138°03′02″E (Note: On Google Maps, positions resulting from searches for "Coonamia railway station" are incorrect.)
- Owner: Successively: South Australian Railways; Australian National; Australian Rail Track Corporation.
- Lines: Originally: Port Pirie to New South Wales border (narrow gauge); After 1937: Additionally, to Adelaide (broad gauge) and Port Augusta (standard gauge); After 1970: Sydney to Perth (standard gauge); After 1982: to Adelaide (standard gauge).
- Structure: 1929–after 1937: open-front waiting shelter 1989–2010s: demountable waiting room.
- Platform: None; ground-level boarding
- Tracks: Through mainline
- Staffing: Unattended
- Stopping: Until 2000: Passenger boarding and alighting on request by alerting train crew 2000–2010s: by pre-booking only.
- Opened: 1929
- Closed: After 1937
- Rebuilt: 1989
- Closed: Early 2010s
Location

Coonamia railway station was a "provisional stopping place" for passenger trains in the rural locality of the same name, 5.0 km (3.1 mi) by rail south-east of the centre of the city of Port Pirie, South Australia. It was operational for two separate periods:

- on the narrow-gauge route to Gladstone, from 1929 until an unknown date before 1970, when it closed
- on the same route (by then standard-gauge), from 1989 to the early 2010s, when it was the final locality in a series of six successive stations for passengers to board and alight trains at Port Pirie.

The stopping place was on Railway Terrace South, near its intersection with Old Race Course Road (now called Hillview Road). The South Australian Railways included it in timetables from about 1929 on the narrow-gauge railway line leading into the hinterland from Port Pirie. It was instituted for local passengers to board and alight trains without having to walk to the station at Port Pirie South.

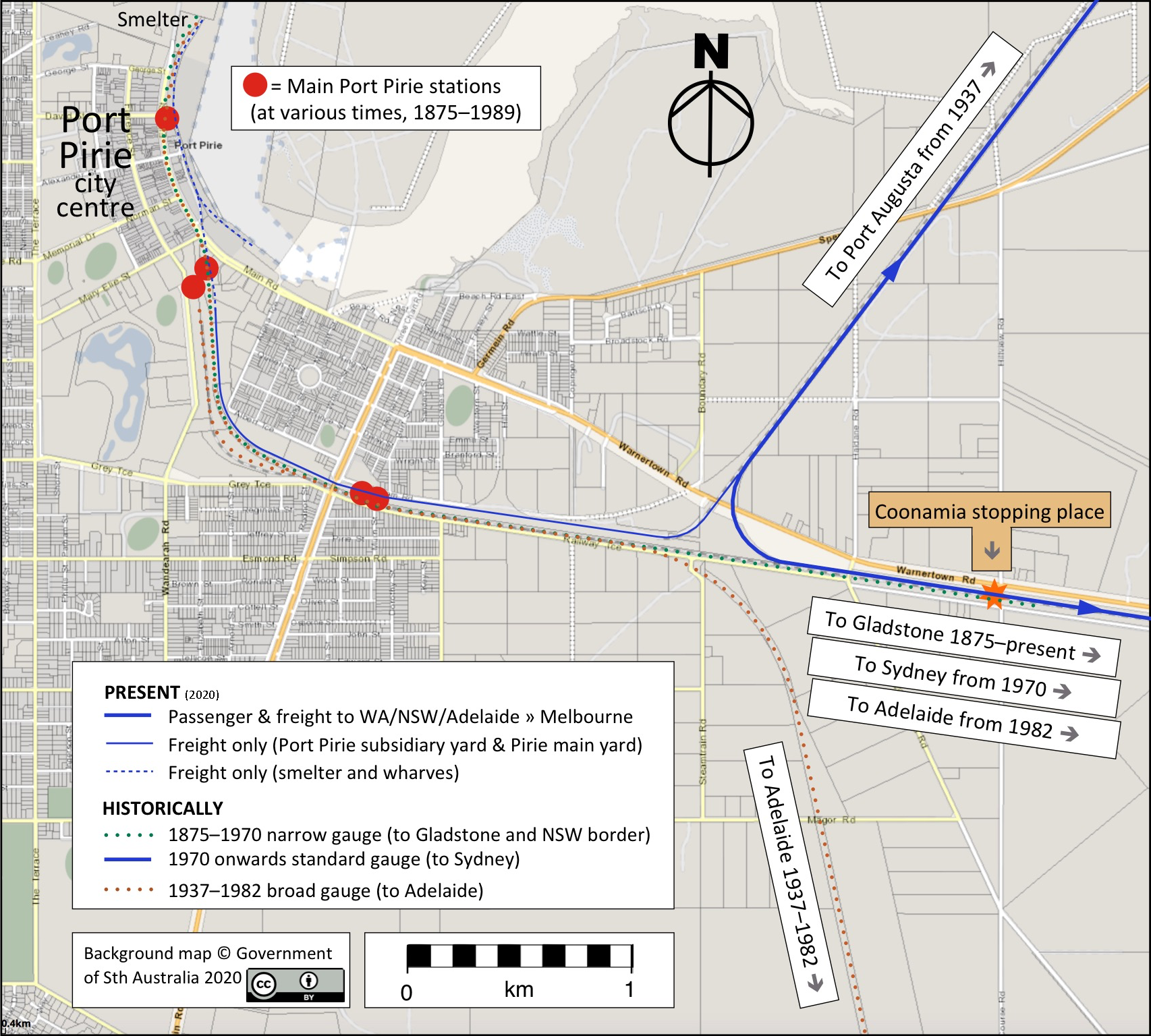
Map including Coonamia provisional stopping place, the now-closed railway stations that preceded it, and the evolution of Port Pirie's three railway gauges (click to enlarge)

Articles about Port Pirie's six railway stations
	Known as	Duration	Gauge		
1	Port Pirie (name changed to "Port Pirie South" in 1902)	1876 to soon after 1911	ng		
2	Ellen Street	1902–1967	ng	bg*	
3	Solomontown	1911–1937	ng		
4	Port Pirie Junction (also dual-signposted, and known colloquially, as "Solomontown")	1937–1967	ng	bg	sg
5	Mary Elie Street	1967–1989		bg	sg
6	Coonamia (this article)	1st, 1929 to after 1937; 2nd, 1989–2010s			sg
* In 1937, one of the two narrow-gauge tracks along Ellen Street was made dual-gauge as far as the station by the addition of a broad-gauge rail. Track gauges: narrow, broad and standard.

The "multi-gauge muddle" in Port Pirie

At various times during a period of close to 140 years, Port Pirie had six railway stations – never more than two concurrently. During the 45-year period 1937–1982, the city became well known as one of the few locations in the world having three railway gauges. (Note: The gauges were 1067 mm (3 ft 6 in), 1435 mm (4 ft 8½ in), and 1600 mm (5 ft 3 in).)
This situation was a result of South Australia's transitioning from lightly constructed narrow gauge to heavy-rail broad gauge (which predominated in the state at the time), then to standard gauge when lines between the mainland state capitals were at last unified. As a consequence, all Port Pirie stations that succeeded the inaugural station of 1876 were either built to accommodate a change of gauge or were affected by one. The timeline, reasons for change, and gauges involved are shown in the following graphic.

Timeline of Port Pirie's six railway stations (click to enlarge):

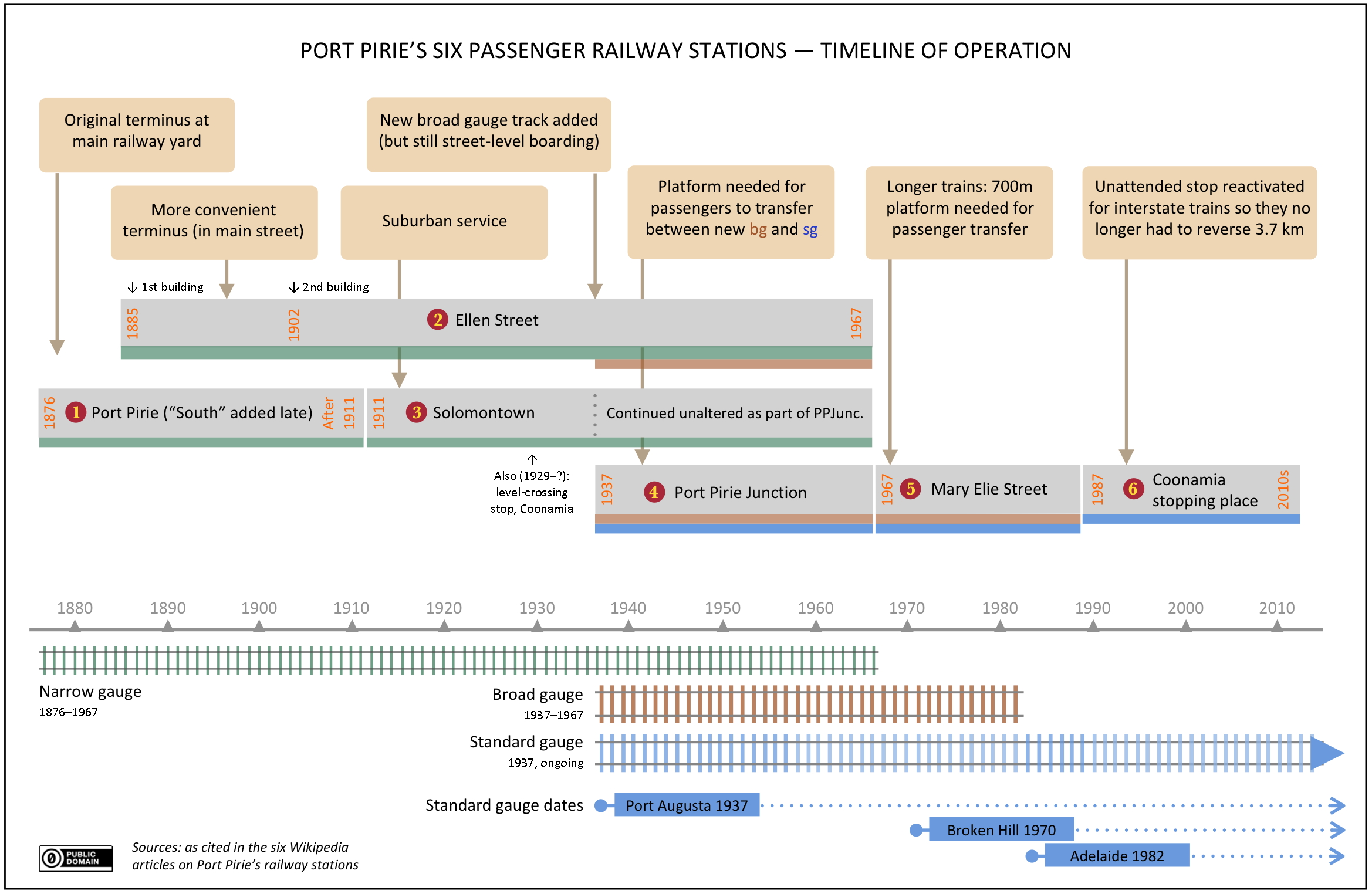

Infrastructure was meagre: only a waiting shed and sign. There was no platform, as for all stations in the Mid North of South Australia at the time. Trains did not stop there unless a passenger signalled the driver to stop or notified the guard to be let off – indicated by an asterisk on timetables and its classification as a "provisional stopping place".

In 1937 a new, more direct, broad-gauge line from Adelaide followed a different route that bypassed Coonamia. The number of passengers using the stopping place declined further and it was eventually closed.

In 1989, the last major Port Pirie station (Mary Elie Street) closed. It was necessary to provide a facility for Port Pirie passengers — not for services to Adelaide, since all South Australian intrastate country passenger services were discontinued that year — but for interstate trains that passed through. The trains involved were The Ghan, Indian Pacific and (until June 1991) the Trans-Australian. (Note: The Indian Pacific was diverted from Mary Elie Street station in August 1986.) As shown on the map, having a stop at Coonamia would allow trains to pick up and drop off Port Pirie passengers without having to reverse 3.8 km (2.4 mi) from the stub terminal to the mainline. (Note: Distance from Google Earth, "Port Pirie".) A small ATCO demountable building, a public telephone booth and a car park were therefore put in place in 1989. The distance between the ground and the lowest step on passenger cars, however, caused difficulty for passengers who were not able-bodied.

Under the new arrangements, passengers had to pre-book to board or alight at Coonamia. Although the stopping place was also utilised by Crystal Brook passengers, since trains no longer stopped at that town, in the early 2010s the two remaining interstate trains no longer stopped and the infrastructure was removed. Only the Coonamia sign and car park remained at the locality as of 2019.

== Final significance ==
Coonamia was never more significant than any other provisional stopping place, but its status in its final years was historic: it was the last of the six "stations" that had served Port Pirie and the last provisional stopping place in South Australia outside the Adelaide metropolitan area. The first Port Pirie station had opened 1876 when the only alternative transport was horse-drawn over unmade roads; Coonamia closed in the era of near-universal availability of motor vehicles.

Operationally, Coonamia is the place where ARTC train controllers in Adelaide (who oversee operations between Broken Hill and Coonamia, and Coonamia southwards) hand over to controllers in Port Augusta (who oversee the line to Port Augusta and points west); the sign remains so that train crews can identify the change-over point, which is also the "0 km" datum point for routes to Port Augusta, Broken Hill and Adelaide. The location has a crossing loop 1638 m (1791 yds) long on the south side of the double mainline from Crystal Brook.

Previous station: Mary Elie Street

Subsequent station: none (passenger services ceased). Bulk freight, in unit trains, continued at the simplified Port Pirie Junction railway station site.

== See also ==
- South Australian Railways
- Transport in South Australia
