= South Australian Railways 600 class (steam) =

Class of Australian 4-6-2 locomotives

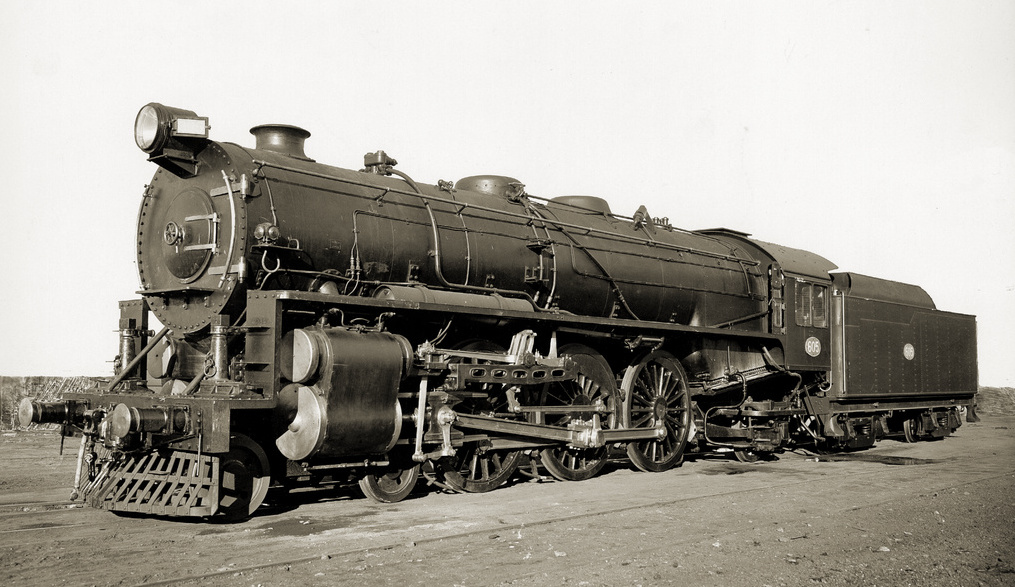
- 600 class locomotive no. 605 soon after delivery
Type and origin
- Power type: Steam
- Designer: Alco / USRA, modified by Fred Shea
- Builder: Armstrong Whitworth
- Serial number: 623-632
- Build date: 1925
- Total produced: 10
- Rebuilder: Islington Railway Workshops
- Rebuild date: 1939-1942
- Number rebuilt: 10
Specifications
- Configuration
  - Whyte: 4-6-2
- Gauge: 1,600 mm (5 ft 3 in)
- Leading dia.: 2 ft 9 in (838 mm)
- Driver dia.: 6 ft 3 in (1,905 mm)
- Trailing dia.: 3 ft 6 in (1,067 mm)
- Length: 79 ft 3 1/4 in (24.162 m).
- Height: 13 ft 11 1/2 in (4,254.5 mm)
- Axle load: 23 long tons 13 cwt 2 qtr (26.52 short tons; 24.05 t)
- Adhesive weight: 70.555 long tons (79.022 short tons; 71.687 t)
- Loco weight: 116 long tons 19 cwt 2 qtr (131.01 short tons; 118.85 t)
- Tender weight: 83.55 long tons (93.58 short tons; 84.89 t)
- Total weight: 199 long tons 11 cwt 2 qtr (223.52 short tons; 202.78 t) (as built); 196 long tons 19 cwt 2 qtr (220.61 short tons; 200.14 t) (rebuilt)
- Fuel type: Coal
- Fuel capacity: 12 long tons (13 short tons; 12 t) (as built); 6 long tons (6.7 short tons; 6.1 t) coal, 1,912 imp gal (2,296 US gal; 8,690 L) oil (rebuilt)
- Water cap.: 7,130 imp gal (8,560 US gal; 32,400 L) (as built); 7,250 imp gal (8,710 US gal; 33,000 L) (rebuilt)
- Firebox
  - Grate area: 55 sq ft (5.1 m^{2})
- Boiler pressure: 200 psi (1,400 kPa) (as built); 215 psi (1,480 kPa) (rebuilt)
- Heating surface
  - Firebox: 270 sq ft (25 m^{2}) (as built); 330 sq ft (31 m^{2}) (rebuilt)
  - Tubes and flues: 2,953 sq ft (274.3 m^{2})
- Superheater
  - Heating area: 743 sq ft (69.0 m^{2})
- Cylinders: 2
- Cylinder size: 24 in × 28 in (610 mm × 711 mm)
- Valve gear: Walschaerts
- Valve type: Piston
Performance figures
- Tractive effort: 36,600 lbf (162.80 kN) as built 39,300 lbf (174.82 kN) rebuilt
- Factor of adh.: 4.43 (as built) 4.04 (rebuilt)
Career
- Operators: South Australian Railways
- Class: 600
- Number in class: 10
- Numbers: 600-609
- First run: 10 May 1926
- Withdrawn: 1958-1961
- Scrapped: 1961-1963
- Disposition: All withdrawn between 1958 and 1961, and then scrapped between 1961 and 1963

The South Australian Railways 600 class was a class of 4-6-2 steam locomotives operated by the South Australian Railways.

== History ==
The 600 class were part of an order for 30 steam locomotives (Note: The other classes of locomotives were the 500 class and 700 class.) placed with Armstrong Whitworth, England, in 1924, as part of the rehabilitation of the state's rail system overseen by railways commissioner William Webb. The 600 class design was based on the USRA Light Pacific, although modifications were made by SAR's Chief Mechanical Engineer, Fred Shea, including those necessary to fit South Australia's tighter loading gauge, which was lower than that of the United States. They arrived in Adelaide in 1926.

609 was named Duke of Gloucester after hauling the Duke's Royal Train in 1934 and so became Australia's first "royal" engine.

The entire class received upgraded boilers and front ends from the late 1930s onwards, and was reclassified as the 600C class. They were also fitted with large smoke deflectors over their lifetime. Ten locomotives of the South Australian Railways 620 class were built at Islington Railway Workshops in 1936–1938, to a similar design.

All examples of the 600 class were withdrawn between 1955 and 1961. None were preserved.

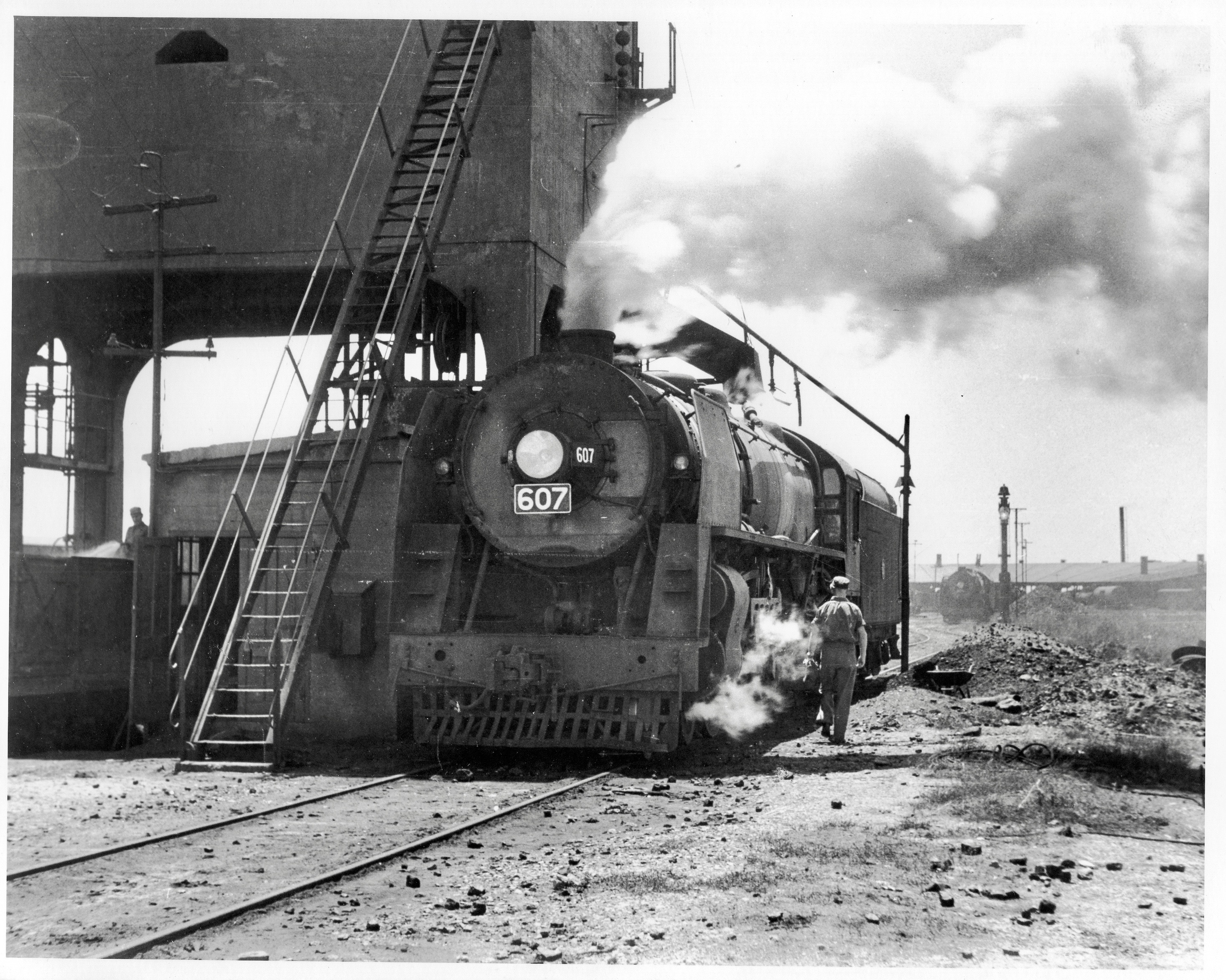
Many 600 class locomotives were based at Tailem Bend; lines to the east were relatively flat, allowing higher speeds made possible by the class's large driving wheels.

== Class list ==
No.	Entered service	Condemned
600	14 August 1926	June 1959
601	10 May 1926	Sep 1958
602	25 May 1926	June 1959
603	18 May 1926	July 1961
604	13 August 1926	June 1959
605	6 July 1926	Sep 1958
606	8 July 1926	May 1960
607	22 June 1926	June 1959
608	22 July 1926	May 1960
609*	21 August 1926	June 1959
* Named Duke of Gloucester
