= Port Pirie Junction railway station =

Former railway station in South Australia

Coordinates: 33°11′28″S 138°01′17″E

Port Pirie Junction

General information
- Location: Railway Terrace, Solomontown, South Australia
- Operator: Commonwealth Railways; South Australian Railways
- Lines: Trans-Australian Railway; Adelaide-Port Pirie; Port Pirie-Cockburn
- Platforms: 2 (1 island)

Construction
- Structure type: Ground

History
- Opened: 23 July 1937
- Closed: 12 November 1967
Location

Port Pirie Junction railway station was located in the city of Port Pirie in South Australia.

== History ==
Port Pirie Junction station opened on 23 July 1937 when the Commonwealth Railways standard gauge Trans-Australian Railway was extended south from Port Augusta, and the South Australian Railways broad gauge line north from Redhill to a new break of gauge station in the Port Pirie suburb of Solomontown.

On 12 November 1967, it was replaced by Port Pirie (Mary Elie Street) station and was later demolished.
