= List of closed railway stations in South Australia =

This is a list of closed, demolished or otherwise defunct railway stations, lines or branches in South Australia. Many of these lines and stations have been either abandoned or dismantled. There is a strong desire by communities to have some of these reopen to link Regional South Australia to the state's capital city of Adelaide. For closed railway stations in greater Adelaide, see List of closed railway stations in Adelaide.

== Existing freight lines ==
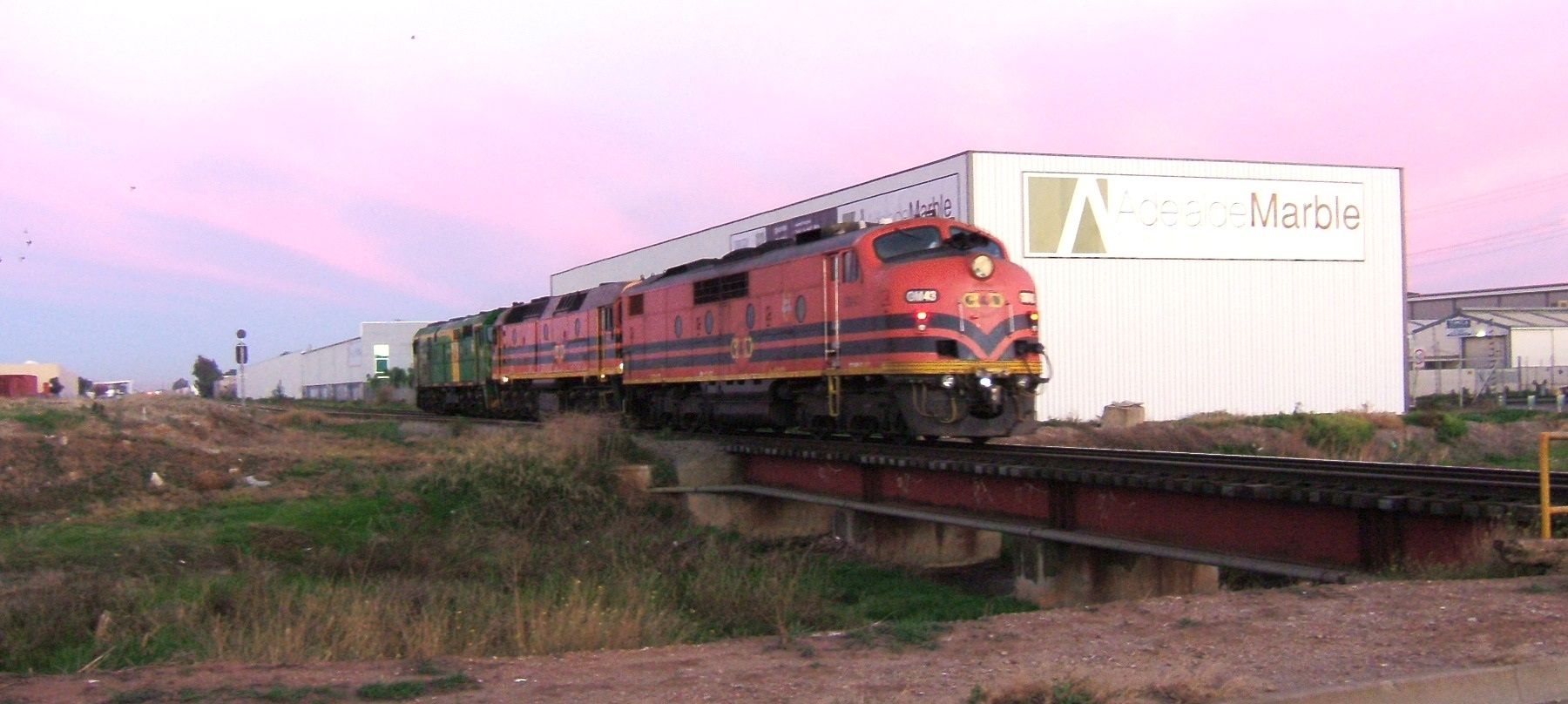
Light engine movement on the Dry Creek-Port Adelaide line at Wingfield

Lines where passenger trains have been withdrawn, but still open for freight:

- Dry Creek-Port Adelaide (closed to passengers 27 May 1988)
  - Wingfield (closed 29 May 1987)
  - North Arm Road (closed 29 May 1987)
  - Eastern Parade (closed 29 May 1987)
  - Rosewater Loop (closed to freight 2008)
    - Grand Junction Road (closed 27 May 1988)
    - Rosewater (closed 27 May 1988)
  - Birkenhead Loop (closed to freight 2008)
  - ICI Osborne (closed to passengers 1980, closed to freight 2014)
    - Coal Gantry
    - Electric Works
    - ICI
- Bridgewater, extension of Belair line (includes stations between Bridgewater and Wolseley) (closed to passengers 31 December 1990 and converted to standard gauge 1995)
  - National Park
  - Long Gully
  - Nalawort
  - Upper Sturt
  - Mount Lofty
  - Heathfield
  - Madurta
  - Aldgate
  - Jibilla
  - Carripook
  - Bridgewater
  - Yantaringa
  - Ambleside
  - Balhannah (to the north was the junction with the Mount Pleasant railway line)
  - Mount Barker Junction (to the east was the junction with the Victor Harbor railway line)
  - Nairne*
  - Petwood
  - Balyarta
  - Callington
  - Warla
  - Monarto South (to the north was the junction with the Sedan railway line)
  - Kinchina
  - Rabila
  - Monteith
  - Tailem Bend (to the east was the junction with the Pinnaroo railway line and the Loxton railway line)
  - Cooke Plains
  - Coomandook
  - Yumali
  - Wahpunyah
  - Ki Ki
  - Coonalpyn
  - Culburra
  - Tintinara
  - Kumorna
  - Coombe
  - Banealla
  - Keith
  - Brimbago
  - Wirrega
  - Cannawigara
  - Bordertown
  - Wolseley (to the east was the junction with the Mount Gambier railway line)
- Port Pirie, branch from the Gawler line at Salisbury (closed 1982 when converted to standard gauge - refer Adelaide-Port Augusta)
  - Direk, the name is derived from "the native word for swamp"
  - Direk
  - Virginia
  - Two Wells
  - Korunye
  - Mallala
  - Calomba
  - Long Plains
  - Avon
  - Kallora
  - Bowmans
  - Goyder
  - Nantawarra
  - Bumbunga
  - Snowtown
  - Burnsfield
  - Lake view
  - Collinsfield
  - Redhill
  - Merriton
  - Wandearah
  - Nurom
  - Port Pirie Junction
  - Port Pirie (Mary Elie Street)
  - Port Pirie (Ellen Street)
- Whyalla, branch of Adelaide-Darwin railway from Port Augusta (closed to passengers 31 December 1990)
  - Whyalla

== Existing tourist lines ==
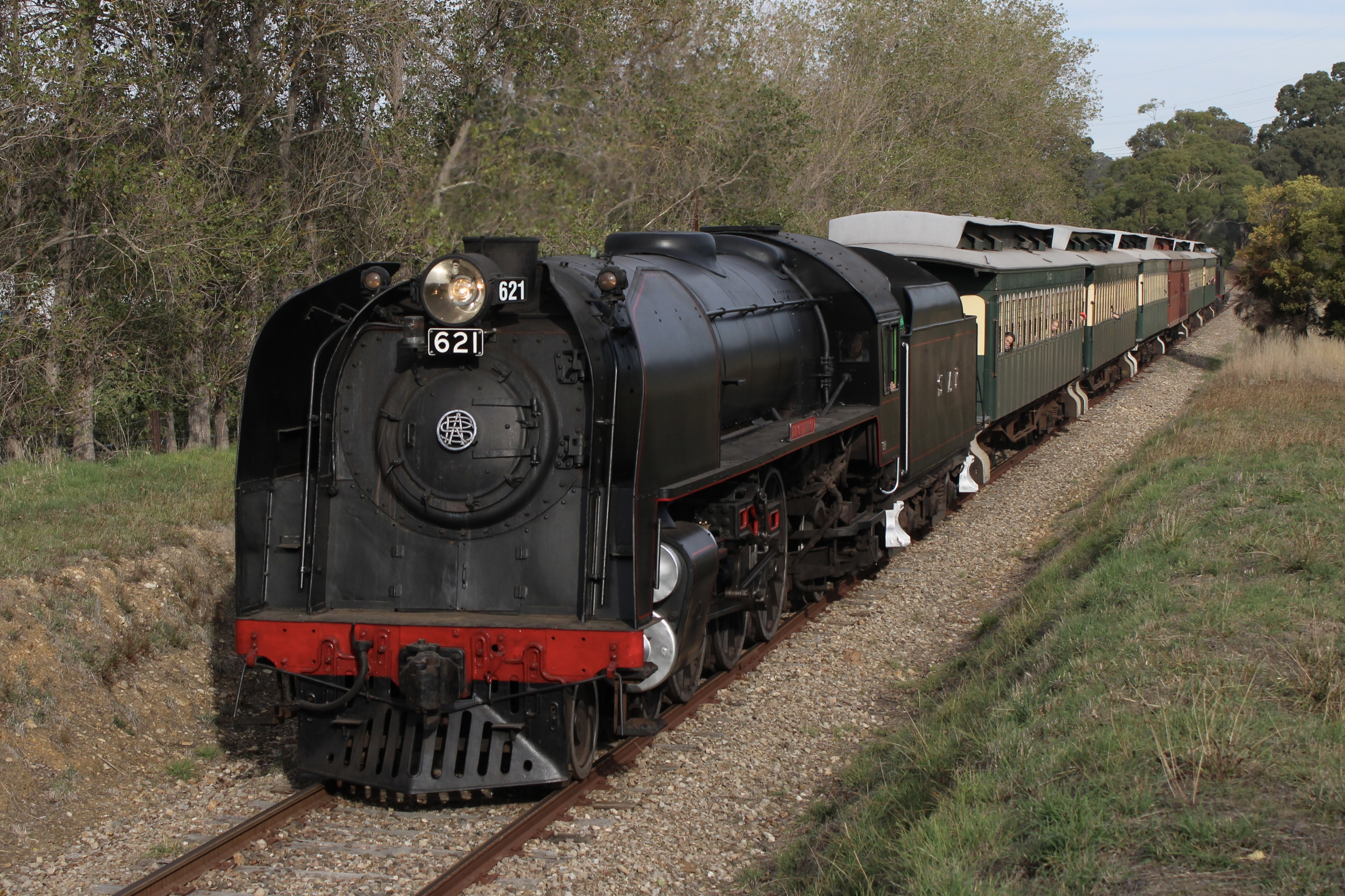
SAR 621 hauling a shuttle into Mount Barker on 23 May 2021

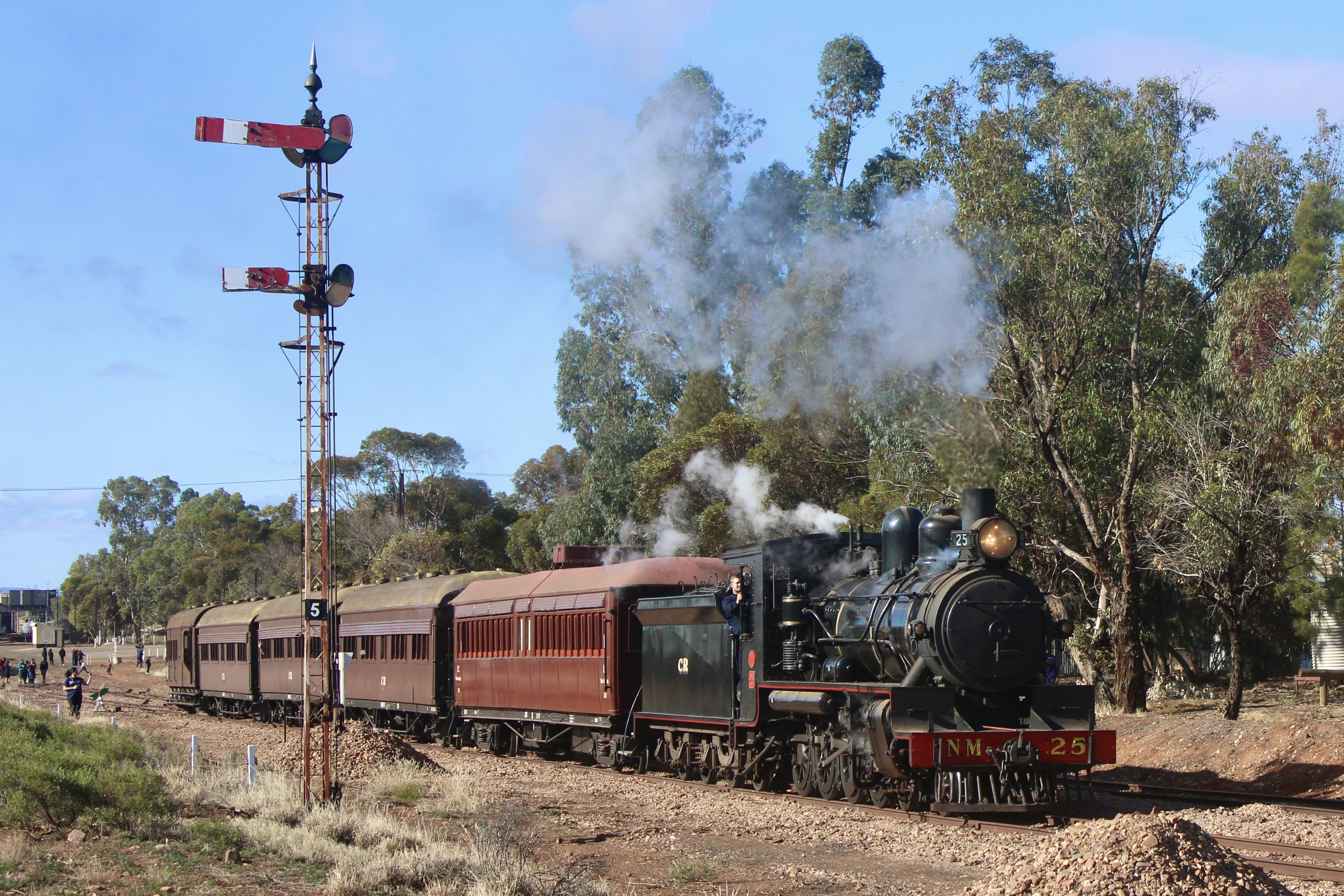
Commonwealth Railways NM class steam locomotive NM25 hauling the Pichi Richi Railway's Afghan Express out of Quorn on 4 July 2020

There are 2 railway lines where passenger and freight have been withdrawn, but are open for tourist, both of which are not located in the city of Adelaide area:

Victor Harbor line, branches from the Wolseley line at Mount Barker Junction (closed to passengers and freight 1984)

- Littlehampton
- Mount Barker
- Philcox Hill
- Bugle Ranges
- Gemmells
- Strathalbyn
- Sandergrove
- Finniss
- Gilberts
- Currency Creek
- Goolwa
- Middleton
- Port Elliot
- Victor Harbor

Quorn line, branches from Port Augusta (closed to passengers and freight 1980)

- Saltia
- Woolshed Flat
- Summit
- Quorn

== Closed lines ==
The following lines are either closed to passengers and freight services or have been removed.

- Mid North:
- Roseworthy-Peterborough railway line
- Balaklava-Moonta railway line
- Morgan railway line
- Hamley Bridge-Gladstone railway line
- Kadina-Brinkworth railway line
- Robertstown railway line
- Spalding railway line
- Barossa Valley railway line
- Murraylands:
- Pinnaroo railway line
- Barmera railway line
- Waikerie railway line
- Peebinga railway line
- Yinkanie railway line
- Loxton railway line
- Adelaide Hills/Mount Lofty Ranges:
- Mount Pleasant railway line
- Sedan railway line
- Willunga railway line
- Milang railway line
- South East:
- Mount Gambier railway line
- Kingston SE railway line
- Beachport railway line
- Mount Gambier-Heywood railway line
- Far North/Flinders Ranges:
- Central Australia Railway
- Leigh Creek railway line
- Peterborough-Quorn railway line
- Wilmington railway line
- Eyre Peninsula:
- Whyalla railway line
- Buckleboo railway line
- Mount Hope railway line
- Port Lincoln-Ceduna railway line
- Wandana-Penong railway line

== Closed stations ==
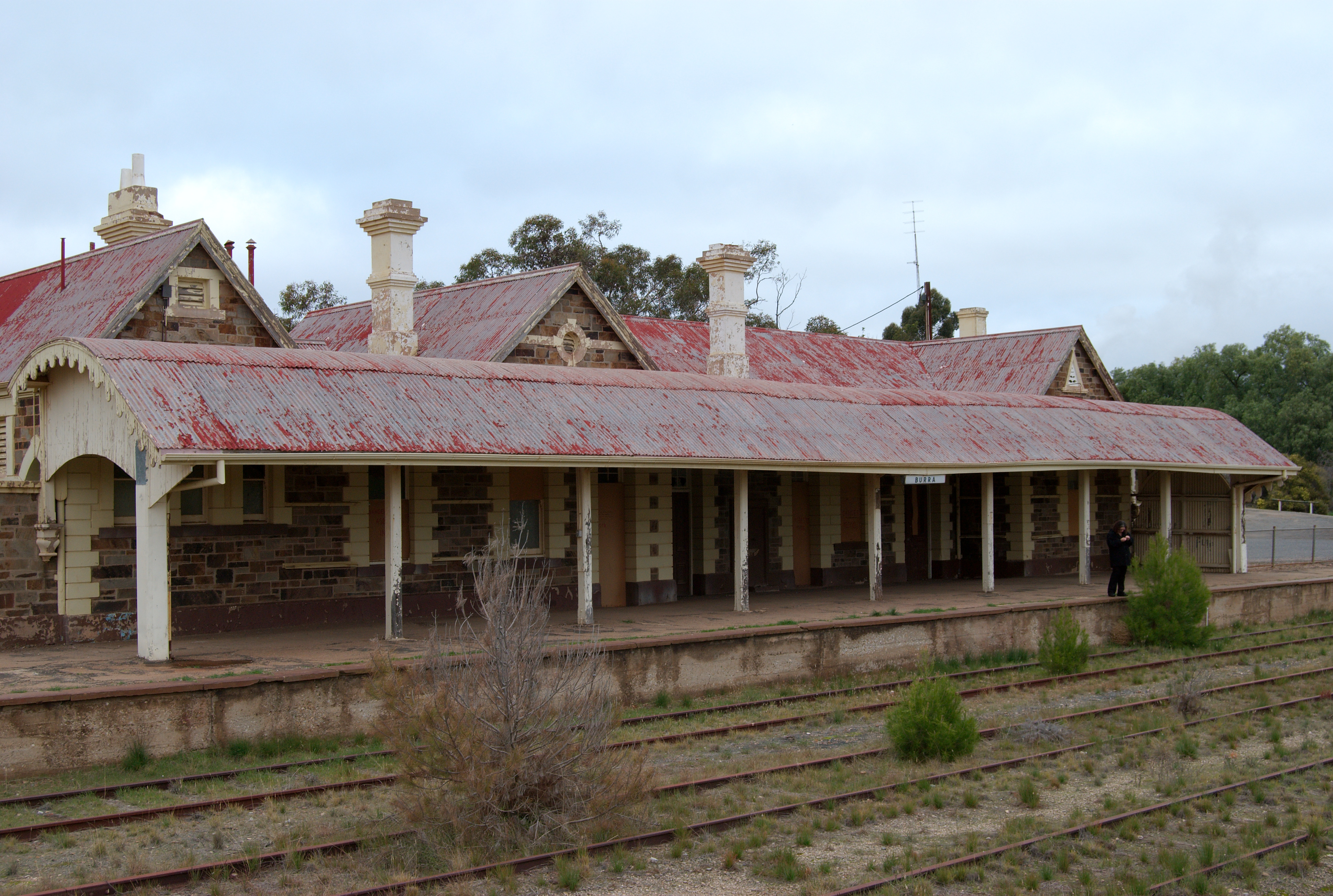
Disused Burra railway station with a sole very hopeful passenger

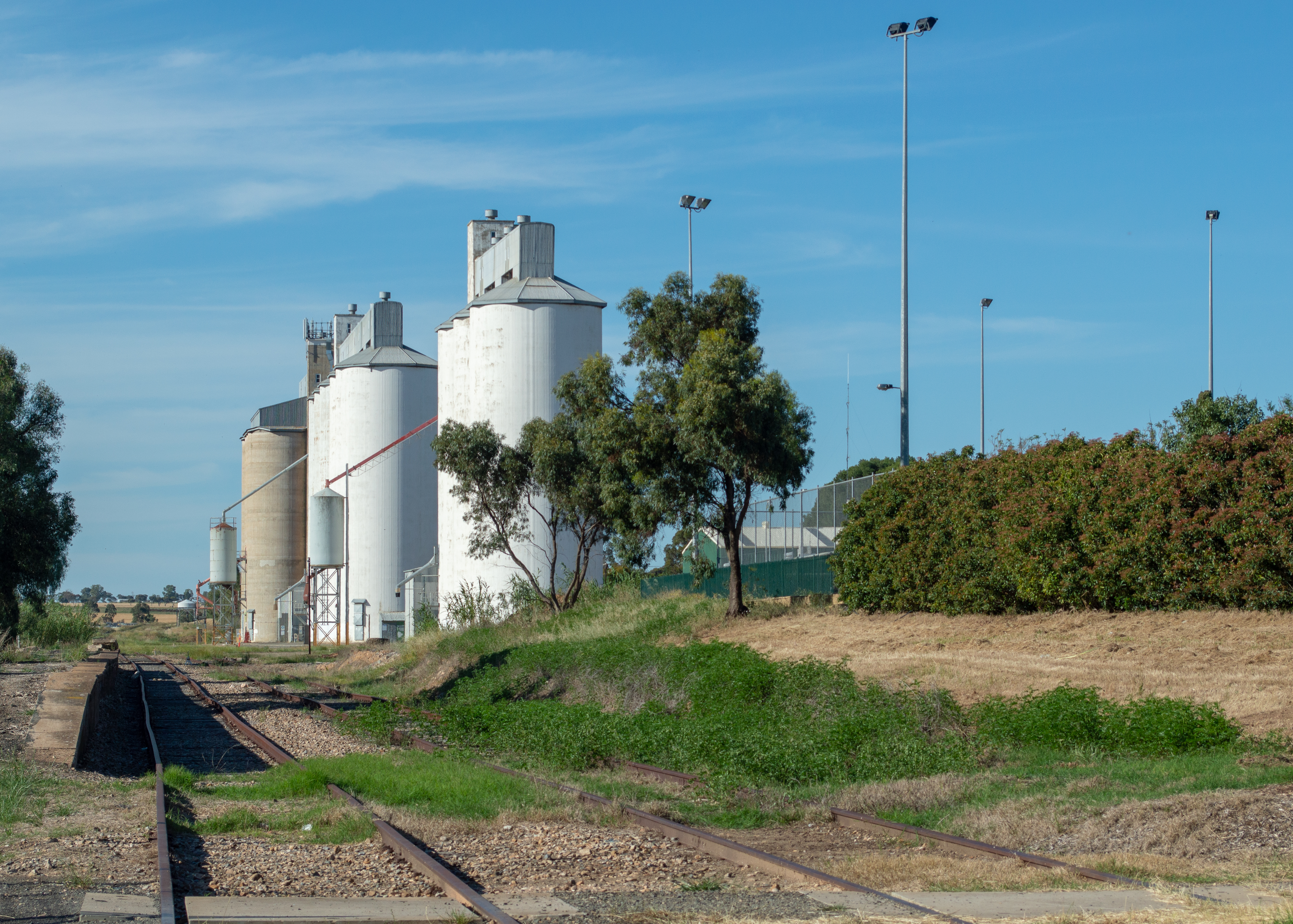
The east-side passenger platform, railway tracks and grain silos at Roseworthy in 2012

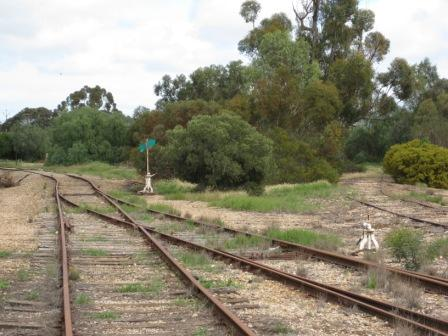
Abandoned railway tracks at the western end of the Balaklava railway station yard

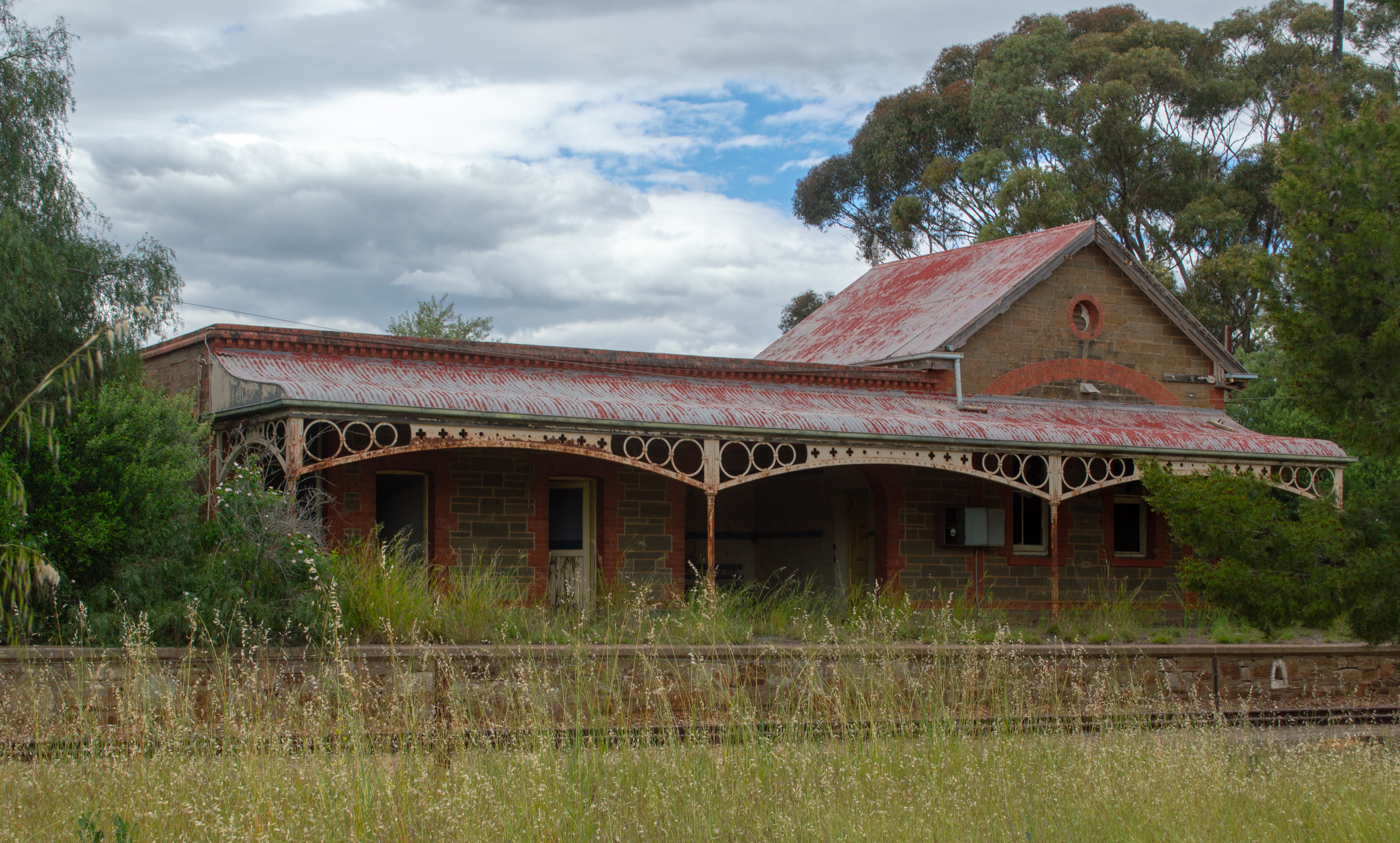
The former Manoora railway station

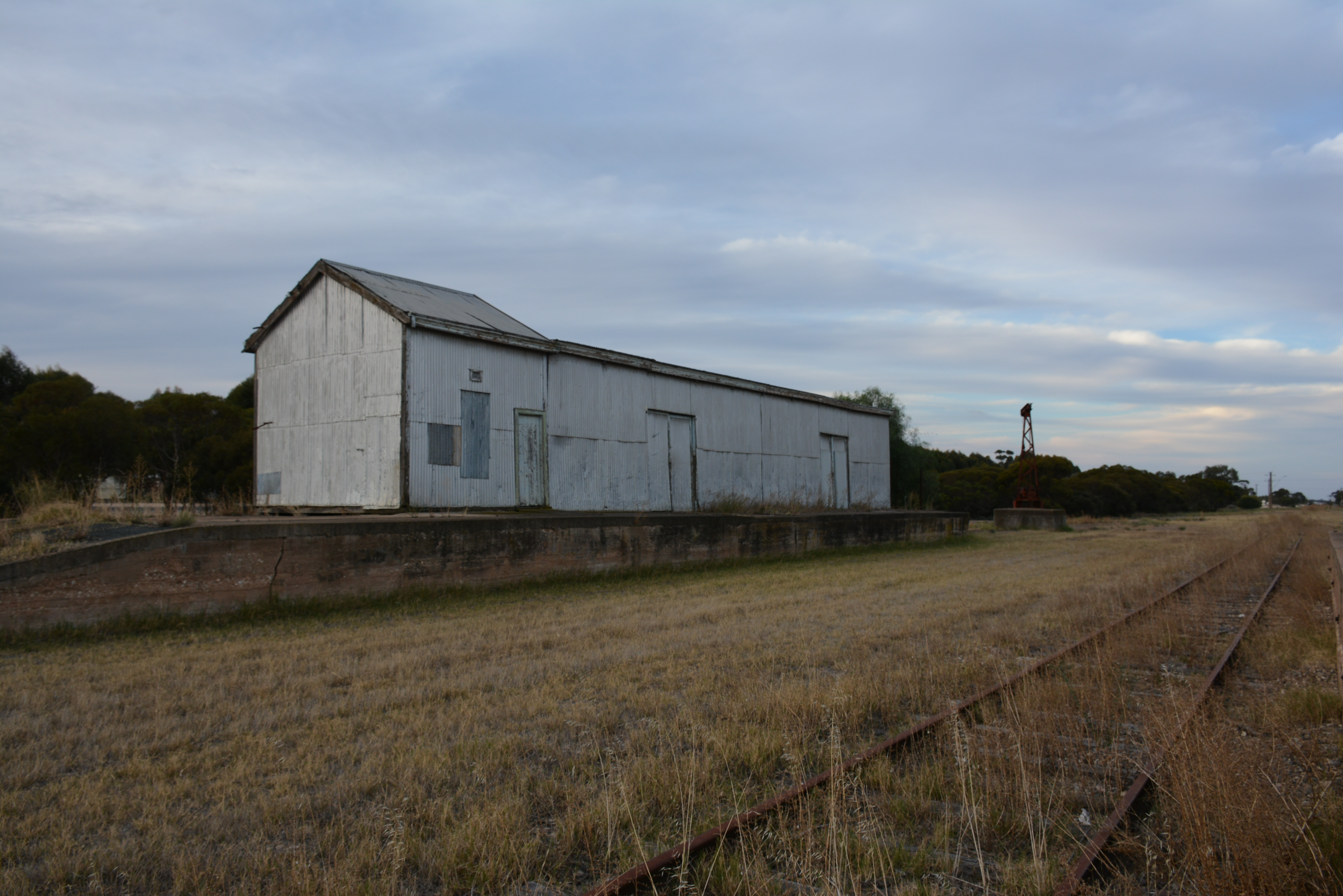
Goods shed, platform and tracks at Pinnaroo, South Australia, looking east from the railway station

Closed railway stations on country railway lines that are no longer used and/or have been dismantled:

Barossa, branched from Gawler railway station, closed to passengers 16 December 1968 beyond North Gawler railway station; freight continued until 2014; North Gawler is now Gawler Central in the metropolitan network

- Kalbeeba
- Sandy Creek
- Lyndoch
- Rowland Flat
- Kabminye
- Bethany
- Tanunda
- Dorrien
- Nuriootpa
- Angaston

Gladstone, branch of Peterborough line from Hamley Bridge railway station (closed 1980s)

- Stockyard Creek
- Owen
- Woods
- Ridgway
- Balaklava
- Halbury
- Hoyleton
- Blyth
- Hart
- Brinkworth
- Boucaut
- Yacka
- Gulnare
- Abbeville
- Georgetown
- Gladstone

Spalding, branch of Terowie line from Riverton (closed 1984)

- Rhynie
- Undalya
- Auburn
- Mulkirri
- Watervale
- Penwortham
- Tatkana
- Sevenhill
- Clare
- Kooramo
- Barinia
- Hilltown
- Andrews
- Spalding

Morgan, extension from Gawler (cut back to Eudunda in 1969, to Kapunda in 1995)

- Roseworthy
- Freeling
- Fords
- Kapunda
- North Kapunda
- Bagot Well
- Hansborough
- Kooninderie
- Hampden
- Eudunda
- Sutherlands
- Bower
- Mount Mary
- Lanosa
- Eba
- Morgan

Mount Gambier, branch of Adelaide-Wolseley line (closed to passengers 1990)

- Custon
- Geegeela
- Frances
- Binnum
- Kybybolite
- Hynam
- Naracoorte
- Struan
- Glenroy
- Coonawarra
- Katnook
- Penola
- Krongart
- Kalangadoo
- Wepar
- Suttons
- Wandilo
- Mitchells
- Compton Park
- Mount Gambier (repurposed as a park in 2015)

Robertstown, branch of Morgan line from Eudunda

- Point Pass
- Robertstown

Truro, branch of Barossa Valley line from Nuriootpa (closed 1990s)

- Plush's Corner
- Stockwell
- Mopami
- Truro

Peterborough, branch from Roseworthy (closed 1980s)

- Roseworthy
- Wasleys
- Hamley Bridge
- Tarlee
- Riverton
- Saddleworth
- Manoora
- Merildin
- Farrell Flat
- Hanson
- Burra
- Mount Bryan
- Hallett
- Ulooloo
- Whyte Yarcowie
- Kearan
- Terowie
- Gumbowie
- Peterborough

Wilmington, narrow-gauge branch from Gladstone (closed 14 March 1990)

- Laura
- Stone Hut
- Wirrabara
- Yandiah
- Booleroo Centre
- Perroomba
- Melrose
- Terka
- Wilmington

Barmera, branch of Adelaide-Wolseley line from Tailem Bend (closed 1990)

- Naturi
- Kulde
- Wynarka
- Karoonda
- Lowaldie
- Borrika
- Halidon
- Mindarie
- Wanbi
- Alawoona
- Paruna
- Meribah
- Nadda
- Taplan
- Nangari
- Pungonda
- Noora
- Ingalta
- Taldra
- Yamba
- Wonuarra
- Paringa
- Paringa Bridge
- Renmark
- Calperum
- Spring Cart Gully
- Berri
- Karoom
- Glossop
- Barmera

Peebinga, branch of Barmera line from Karoonda (closed 7 December 1990)

- Nunkeri
- Yurgo
- Marama
- Kulkami
- Mulpata
- Wirha
- Gurrai
- Karte
- Kringin
- Mootatunga
- Peebinga

Pinnaroo, branch of Wolseley line from Tailem Bend (closed 2015)

- Moorlands
- Sherlock
- Peake
- Jabuk
- Geranium
- Parrakie
- Wilkawatt
- Lameroo
- Parilla
- Chandos
- Pinnaroo

Waikerie, branch of Barmera line from Karoonda (closed 1990s)

- Mindiyarra
- Perponda
- Kalyan
- Goondooloo
- Copeville
- Kunlara
- Galga
- Mercunda
- Mantung
- Hillmanville
- Maggea
- Boolgun
- Holder Siding
- Kanni
- Waikerie

Yinkanie, branch of Barmera line from Wanbi (closed 1 May 1971)

- Gluyas
- Caliph
- Bayah
- Tuscan
- Koowa
- Wunkar
- Myrla
- Wappilka
- Yinkanie

Loxton, branch of Barmera line from Alawoona (closed 2015)

- Veitch
- Pata
- Tookayerta
- Loxton

Mount Pleasant, branch of Wolseley line from Balhannah (closed 1963)

- Oakbank
- Mappinga
- Riverview
- Woodside
- Kayannie
- Charleston
- Muralappie
- Mount Torrens
- Milkappa Road
- Birdwood
- Crane Road
- Narcoonah
- Mount Pleasant

Sedan, branch of Wolseley line from Monarto South (closed 2005)

- Pallamana
- Tepko
- Apamurra
- Milendella
- Sanderston
- Kanappa
- Cambrai
- Sedan

Moonta, branch of Gladstone line from Balaklava (closed 1980s)

- Saints
- Bowmans
- Port Wakefield
- South Hummocks
- Melton
- Paskeville
- Green's Plains
- Kadina
- Wallaroo Mines
- Wallaroo
- Parramatta
- Cross Roads
- Yelta
- Moonta

Brinkworth, branch of Moonta line from Kadina (closed 1990s)

- Willamulka
- Mona
- Bute
- Barunga Gap
- Snowtown
- Condowie
- Brinkworth

Quorn, branch of Broken Hill line from Peterborough (closed 1980s)

- Black Rock
- Orroroo
- Walloway
- Eurelia
- Carrieton
- Moockra
- Hammond
- Bruce
- Quorn

Kingston SE railway line, branch of Mount Gambier line from Naracoorte (closed 28 November 1987)

- Stewarts
- Lucindale
- Avenue
- Reedy Creek
- Kingston SE

Milang, branch of Victor Harbor line from Sandergrove railway station (closed 17 June 1970)

- Nurragi
- Punkulde
- Milang

Beachport railway line, branch from Mount Gambier (closed April 1995)

- Compton
- Marte
- Burrungule
- Tantanoola
- Snuggery
- Millicent
- Rendelsham
- Beachport

Heywood railway line, branch from Mount Gambier (closed 11 April 1995)

- Murrawa
- Glenburnie
- Kromelite
- Rennick

(line continues into Victoria)

Central Australia line, branch from Port Augusta (closed 1980)

- Saltia
- Woolshed Flat
- Summit
- Quorn
- Willochra
- Gordon
- Wilson
- Hawker
- Hookina
- Mern Merna
- Edieowie
- Brachina
- Parachilna
- Nilpena
- Beltana
- Puttapa
- Copley
- Telford
- Lyndhurst
- Farina
- Wirrawilla
- Mundownda
- Marree
- Coward Springs
- William Creek
- Warrina
- Oodnadatta
- Wire Creek

(line continues into Northern Territory)

Leigh Creek line, branch from Port Augusta (closed 2016)

- Wilkatana
- Neuroodla
- Cotabena
- Moralana
- Brachina
- Parachilna
- Beltana
- Puttapa
- Leigh Creek
- Copley
- Telford
- Lyndhurst
- Farina
- Witchelina
- Mundownda
- Marree

== See also ==
- List of Adelaide railway stations
- List of suburban and commuter rail systems
- TransAdelaide
- Railways in Adelaide
- South Australian Railways
- Rail transport in South Australia
