= Tantanoola railway station =

Former railway station in South Australia, Australia

Penola

General information
- Location: Railway Terrace, Tantanoola, South Australia
- Coordinates: 37.69678831656411°S 140.45542264318956°E
- Operator: Australian National
- Line: Beachport line
- Distance: 414 kilometres from Adelaide
- Platforms: 1
- Tracks: 1

Construction
- Structure type: Ground

Other information
- Status: Closed

History
- Opened: 1880
- Closed: 12 April 1995 (freight); 1 July 2006 (tourist)

Services
| Preceding station | Limestone Coast Railway | Following station |
|---|---|---|
| Burrungule towards Mount Gambier | Beachport railway line | Snuggery towards Beachport |
Location

Tantanoola railway station was located on the Beachport railway line. It served the town of Tantanoola.

== History ==
Tantanoola railway station opened in 1880 as part of the narrow gauge railway line between Mount Gambier and Beachport inland via Millicent. The line and jetty at Beachport provided the ability for farms in the district to export wool and grain. The station consisted of a corrugated iron barrel-vaulted goods shed, which is one of the oldest remaining railway buildings in the South East. Tantanoola was named after the native word "Tantanoola," meaning a hut constructed of brushwood.

The line through Tantanoola was converted to broad gauge in the 1950s.

Railway operations were suspended on 12 April 1995 with the conversion of the Adelaide-Melbourne railway line to standard gauge. The tourist Limestone Coast Railway ran from Mount Gambier to Millicent with South Australian Railways Redhen railcars from 1998 until 2006.

The station was renovated, after falling into a state of disrepair.
