= Penola railway station =

Former railway station in South Australia, Australia

Penola

General information
- Location: Ellen Street, Penola, South Australia
- Coordinates: 37.3730782645508°S 140.83254006595638°E
- Operator: Australian National
- Line: Mount Gambier line
- Distance: 384 kilometres from Adelaide
- Platforms: 1
- Tracks: 1

Construction
- Structure type: Ground

Other information
- Status: Closed

History
- Opened: 14 June 1887
- Closed: 31 December 1990 (passengers); 12 April 1995 (freight); 1 July 2006 (tourist)

Services
Preceding station	Limestone Coast Railway	Following station
Coonawarra towards Adelaide	Mount Gambier railway line	Krongart towards Mount Gambier
Location

Penola railway station was located on the Mount Gambier railway line in the South Australian town of Penola.

== History ==
Penola railway station opened on 14 June 1887 when the railway line was extended from Naracoorte south towards Mount Gambier. The railway station was one of the several to be built to the same design by architect Alfred McBain Bonython at Moonta, Tailem Bend, Wallaroo and Murray Bridge. It consisted of a goods shed, high level platform and a low level station building and was named after the native name originally applied to the station property of Alex Cameron.

The Mount Gambier line was gauge converted to broad gauge in 1953 with the narrow gauge line being removed completely by 1959.

The station closed on 31 December 1990 when the Adelaide-Mount Gambier passenger service ceased but the line still continued to be used by freight. When the Adelaide-Melbourne railway line was converted to standard gauge, the Mount Gambier line was not converted and closed on 12 April 1995.

The tourist Limestone Coast Railway ran from Mount Gambier to Coonawarra with South Australian Railways Redhen railcars from 1998 until the year 2000. It again resumed a limited service to Penola but it was suspended on 1 July 2006 due to problems with public liability insurance.

The line through Penola has been ripped up and replaced with the Coonawarra Rail Trail.
