= Kalangadoo railway station =

Former railway station in South Australia, Australia

Kalangadoo
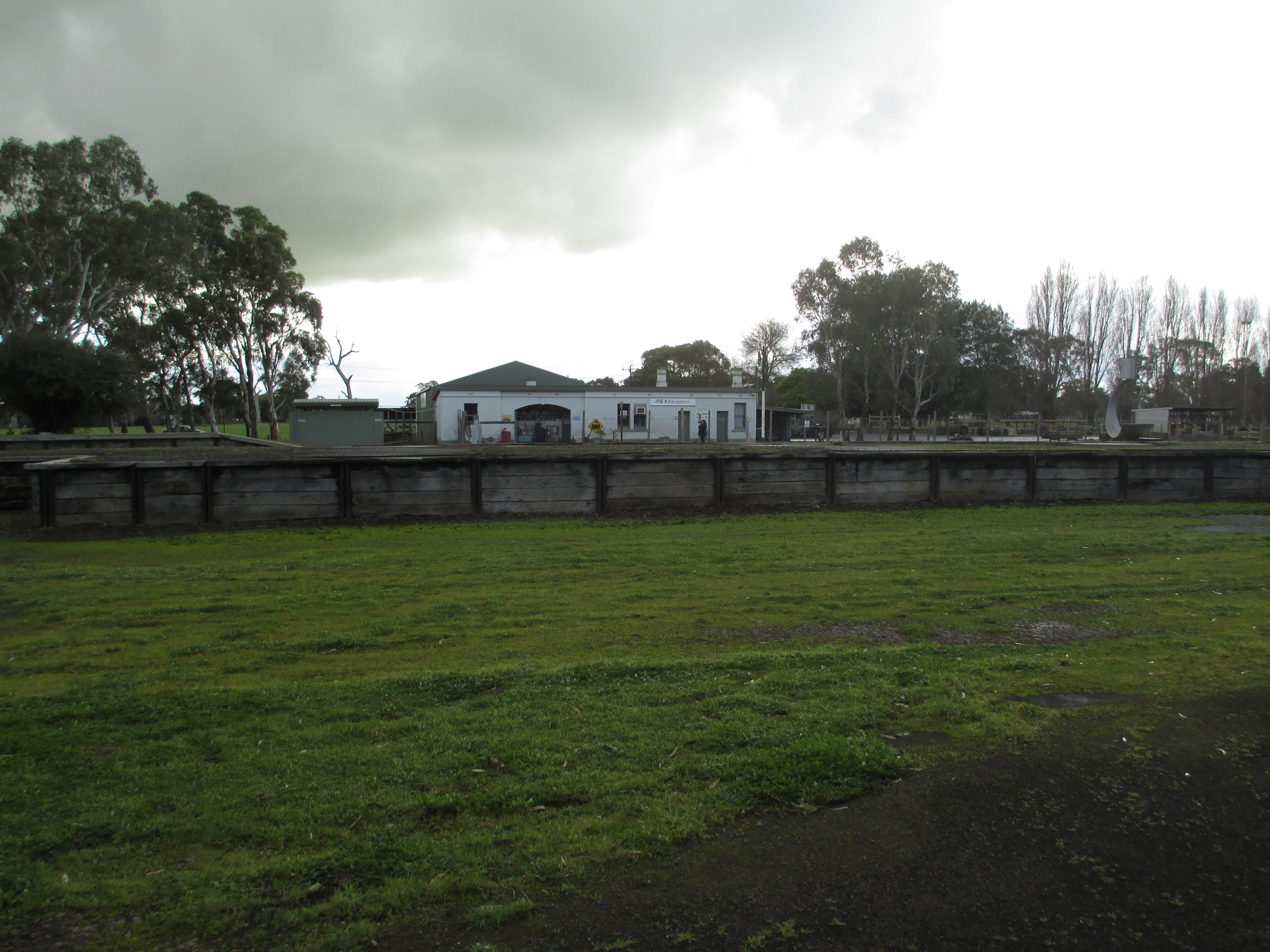
- Kalangadoo platforms and station building in 2015.

General information
- Location: Crowe Street, Kalangadoo, South Australia
- Coordinates: 37.561247933951385°S 140.6991761695281°E
- Elevation: 66 m (217 ft)
- System: Former Limestone Coast Railway tourist rail
- Operator: South Australian Railways 1887 - 1978 Australian National 1978 - 1990 Limestone Coast Railway 1998 - 2006
- Line: Mount Gambier line
- Distance: 384 kilometres from Adelaide
- Platforms: 1
- Tracks: 2

Construction
- Structure type: Ground

Other information
- Status: Closed to rail traffic, open as a museum

History
- Opened: 14 June 1887
- Closed: 30 September 1985 (freight); 31 December 1990 (passengers); 1 July 2006 (tourist)

Services
Preceding station	Limestone Coast Railway	Following station
Krongart towards Adelaide	Mount Gambier railway line	Wepar towards Mount Gambier
Location

Kalangadoo railway station was located on the Mount Gambier railway line. It served the town of Kalangadoo, South Australia.

== History ==
=== Construction and opening ===
On 14 June 1887, the railway line was extended from Naracoorte south towards Mount Gambier. As part of this extension, a railway siding was built at Kalangadoo, but upon opening, it only included goods facilities such as a shed and platform, and sidings for loading general goods and sheep. When a new station building was proposed in 1907, it was planned to be built on the eastern side of the yard, opposite from the goods facilities and the township. The members of the local electorate wished to have it built on the western side of the yard to be next to the township, but the Railway Commissioner continued with the initial plan to build it on the eastern side. The station building was completed in December 1907 by contractors Messrs Gambling & Son, who also built other stations around the state.

=== Gauge conversion and upgrades ===
In 1945, work started to convert the Mount Gambier line to broad gauge. To accommodate the broad gauge and its increased traffic, the station yard received various upgrades such as a passenger platform, a replacement goods shed, and overhead goods cranes with a carrying capacity of 80 tons. Following some broad gauge construction delays caused by flooding, Kalangadoo became a temporary terminus station for the broad gauge when it was opened as far as the town during a ceremony on 24 October 1952. Kalangadoo became the destination of the first diesel locomotive to the South East division when a special Ministerial train arrived at the town during the ceremony. By 23 June 1953, the broad gauge extended through Kalangadoo to Mount Gambier.

=== Closure to regular traffic ===
Ownership of the station and the railway line was transferred to Australian National in 1978. Kalangadoo station became officially unattended and closed to freight on 30 September 1985. However, the station was not vacated by the stationmaster until 30 June 1986. Around this period, the station was unofficially renamed Claytons after the non-alcoholic beverage, comparing the Claytons advertising punchline "The drink you have when you're not having a drink", to the continued use of the station by passengers after becoming unattended. However, the name caused some confusion, resulting in a passenger missing their stop and so the Claytons sign was taken down. The last service to use the station was the Bluebird railcar passenger service to Mount Gambier, known as the Blue Lake. When AN ceased all intrastate passenger services in South Australia including the Blue Lake, the station closed to passengers on December 31, 1990, but freight services continued through Kalangadoo to Mount Gambier. When the Adelaide-Melbourne railway line was converted to standard gauge, the Mount Gambier line remained as broad gauge, consequentially becoming isolated and was closed to remaining freight services on 12 April 1995.

=== Limestone Coast Railway and reopening as a museum ===
The Limestone Coast Railway ran tourist trains from Mount Gambier to Coonawarra with South Australian Railways Redhen railcars from 1998 until the year 2000, including stops at Kalangadoo. It again resumed a limited service to Penola but it was suspended on 1 July 2006 due to problems with public liability insurance. On October 11 1999, the station building became a retail outlet for AusPine, which sold timber. The company allowed a railway museum to be set up in part of the station building by the last Kalangadoo stationmaster, Peter Savage. When AusPine vacated the premises in 2011, the railway museum was expanded throughout the whole building. Savage received an SA Heritage Heroes commendation in 2012 for his role in setting up the museum, and was presented a donation by the Kalangadoo Farmers’ Market committee in 2022, which went towards refurbishment of the building.
