= Millicent railway station =

Former railway station in South Australia, Australia

Millicent
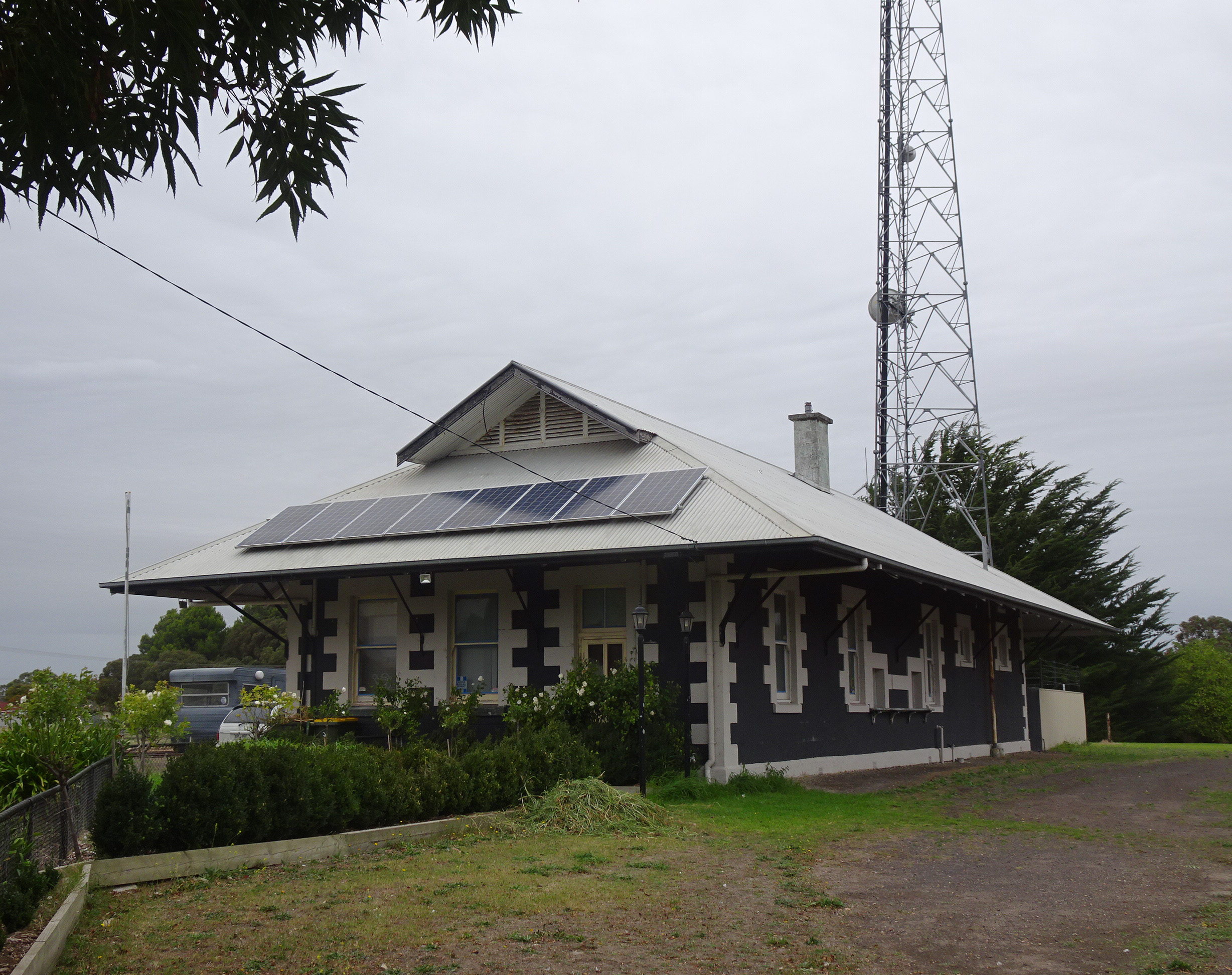
- The Millicent railway station building in 2021.

General information
- Location: Railway Terrace, Millicent, South Australia
- Coordinates: 37.59455993344363°S 140.3552504545745°E
- Operator: Australian National
- Line: Beachport line
- Distance: 400 kilometres from Adelaide
- Platforms: 1
- Tracks: 1

Construction
- Structure type: Ground

Other information
- Status: Closed

History
- Opened: 1879
- Closed: 12 April 1995 (freight); 2000 (tourist)

Services
Preceding station	Australian National Railways Commission	Following station
Snuggery towards Mount Gambier	Beachport railway line	Rendelsham towards Beachport
Location

Millicent railway station was located on the Beachport railway line. It served the town of Millicent.

== History ==
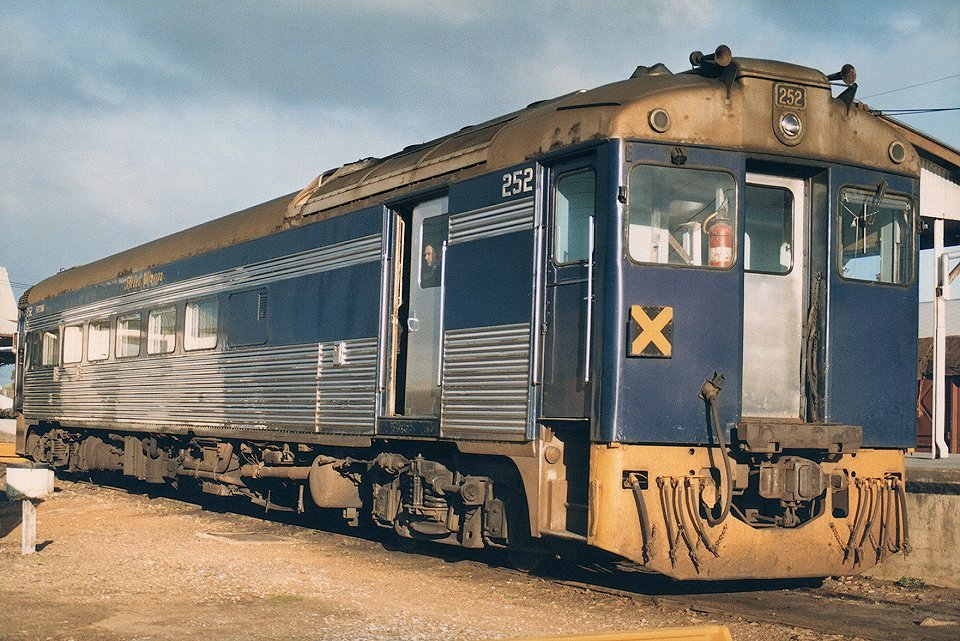
Bluebird 252 "Blue Wren" in Millicent dead end siding, July 1983, ready for piloting to loco out in New marshalling yard

Millicent railway station opened in 1879 with the opening of the narrow gauge railway between the port on Rivoli Bay at what is now Beachport, inland via Millicent to Mount Gambier in 1878. The line and jetty at Beachport provided the ability for farms in the district to export wool and grain. The station building consisted of a facility comprising a ticket office and platforms for loading and unloading both passengers and freight. The station was named after the daughter of Augustus Short, the first Bishop of Adelaide, and wife of George Glen, S.M., who owned Mayurra Station, on which the town was established.

The line was converted to broad gauge in the 1950s with the section past Millicent being decommissioned in 1959.

Railway operations were suspended on 12 April 1995 with the conversion of the Adelaide-Melbourne railway line to standard gauge. The tourist Limestone Coast Railway ran from Mount Gambier to Millicent with South Australian Railways Redhen railcars from 1998 until the year 2000.

The railway station housed a radio station until the railway lands were sold off for community facilities and a suburban activity centre in 2023.
