= Glenroy railway station, South Australia =

Former railway station in South Australia, Australia

Glenroy

General information
- Location: Flint Road, Glenroy, South Australia
- Coordinates: 37.221236706898715°S 140.81829397181494°E
- System: Former Australian National regional rail
- Operator: South Australian Railways 1887 - 1978 Australian National 1978 - 1990
- Line: Mount Gambier line
- Distance: 369 kilometres from Adelaide
- Platforms: 1
- Tracks: 2

Construction
- Structure type: Ground

Other information
- Status: Closed and demolished

History
- Opened: 14 June 1887

Services
Preceding station	Australian National Railways Commission	Following station
Coonawarra towards Adelaide	Mount Gambier railway line	Struan towards Mount Gambier
Location

Glenroy railway station was located on the Mount Gambier railway line. It served the locality of Glenroy, South Australia.

== History ==
On 14 June 1887, the railway line was extended from Naracoorte south towards Mount Gambier. As part of this extension, a goods accommodation and railway yards were built at Glenroy, but upon opening, it only included goods facilities such as a shed and platform, and sidings for loading general goods and sheep but a new station was built later on.

Broad gauge was fully installed along the Mount Gambier line by 1953, becoming dual gauge until the removal of the narrow gauge by 1959.

By the late 1980s, the station was deleted from the Australian National working timetable. The last service to use the line, the Bluebird railcar passenger service to Mount Gambier, known as the Blue Lake ceased to operate, along with all regional passenger trains in South Australia on 31 December 1990, but freight services continued through Glenroy to Mount Gambier. When the Adelaide-Melbourne railway line was converted to standard gauge, the Mount Gambier line remained as broad gauge, consequentially becoming isolated and was closed to remaining freight services on 12 April 1995. There is no longer any trace of the station.
