= Mount Gambier–Heywood railway line =

Former railway in Victoria and South Australia

Mount Gambier-Heywood railway line
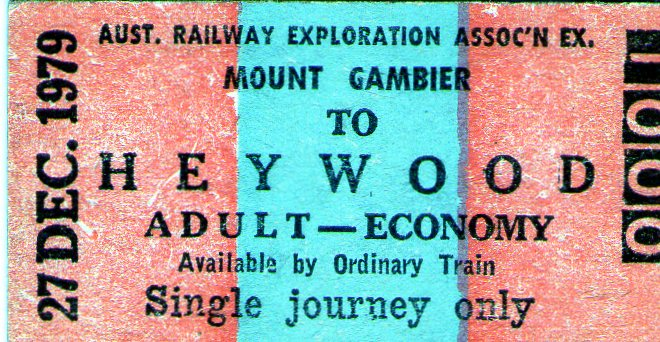
- Mt Gambier-Heywood rail ticket 1979

Overview
- Status: Closed, Dormant
- Locale: Limestone Coast, South Australia; Barwon South West, Victoria
- Termini: Mount Gambier; Heywood
- Continues from: Mount Gambier–Wolseley line
- Continues as: Portland line

Service
- System: South Australian Railways; Victorian Railways
- Operator(s): Victorian Railways

History
- Opened: Heywood–Dartmoor: 22 June 1916; Dartmoor–state border: 28 November 1917; State border–Mount Gambier: 28 November 1917
- Closed: 11 April 1995

Technical
- Line length: 90.8 km (56.4 mi)
- Track gauge: 1,600 mm (5 ft 3 in)

Mount Gambier–Heywood railway line is a 5 ft 3 in (1,600 mm) line located in Australia which operated from 27 November 1917 to 11 April 1995 between Mount Gambier in the state of South Australia and Heywood in the state of Victoria. It is one of two railway lines built by both state governments following an agreement in 1912 to connect to each other's railway networks. There has been calls for standardisation over the past two decades from Heywood to Wolseley since the Melbourne to Adelaide line was converted in 1995.

== Naming ==
The line is gazetted as the "Mount Gambier–Heywood Railway" by both the South Australian and Victorian governments. This name was also used in a report jointly published by the two state governments in 2009.

Newspaper reports published in both states about the railway line before its opening used the title "Portland–Mount Gambier Railway." Some sources published in Victoria refer to the line as the "Mount Gambier line."

== History ==
The South Australian and Victorian governments agreed on 28 November 1912 to connect their respective railway networks at two places by constructing lines between Heywood and Mount Gambier and between Murrayville in Victoria and Pinnaroo in South Australia with legislation subsequently passed by both parliaments being enacted on 14 December 1912 and 23 December 1912 respectively.

The agreement between the two state governments gave the responsibility for the construction of the line between Heywood and Mount Gambier to the Government of Victoria and the responsibility for the line between Murrayville and Pinnaroo to the Government of South Australia. The section of line between Heywood and Dartmoor was completed on 22 June 1916 with the remainder of the line being complete on 28 November 1917.

The railway line opened for business on 28 November 1917 without any "special ceremony" and with passenger services scheduled for Mondays, Wednesdays and Fridays.

The rail service between Mount Gambier and Heywood was suspended on 11 April 1995 due to the standardization of the gauges of the Melbourne–Adelaide and the Maroona-Portland lines. The South Australian section of the line between Mount Gambier and Rennick was used by the tourist service, the Limestone Coast Railway, until 20 March 1999.

In 2009, the South Australian and Victorian governments published an action plan for freight services within the Green Triangle Region which advised that projected volumes of woodchip intended for export from the Port of Portland in the years 2012–2015 would make a restored Mount Gambier–Heywood rail line a "potentially … commercially viable" operation. In 2020 the Limestone Coast Regional Development Board conducted a feasibility study with the CSIRO to build a Freight Department at the Glenburnie Saleyards to reopen the line to Heywood and connect with the Melbourne to Adelaide network but is still being pursued for government standardisation.

Due to the construction of a public space park where Mount Gambier railway station once stood in 2015, the line is no longer connected to the Millicent and Wolseley lines only with a two track easement left in its space for right of way.

== Stations ==
Stations included the following: (from west to east):

- Mount Gambier
- Murrawa, Glenburnie and Kromelite which are all located in the locality of Glenburnie
- Rennick (and the following are all located in Victoria)
- Malanganee
- Puralka
- Marp
- Dartmoor
- Winnap
- Greenwald
- Lyons
- Drumborg
- Heywood

== See also ==
- Rail transport in South Australia
- Rail transport in Victoria
- Pinnaroo railway line, South Australia
- Pinnaroo railway line, Victoria
