= Long Plains railway station =

Former railway station in South Australia, Australia

Long Plains
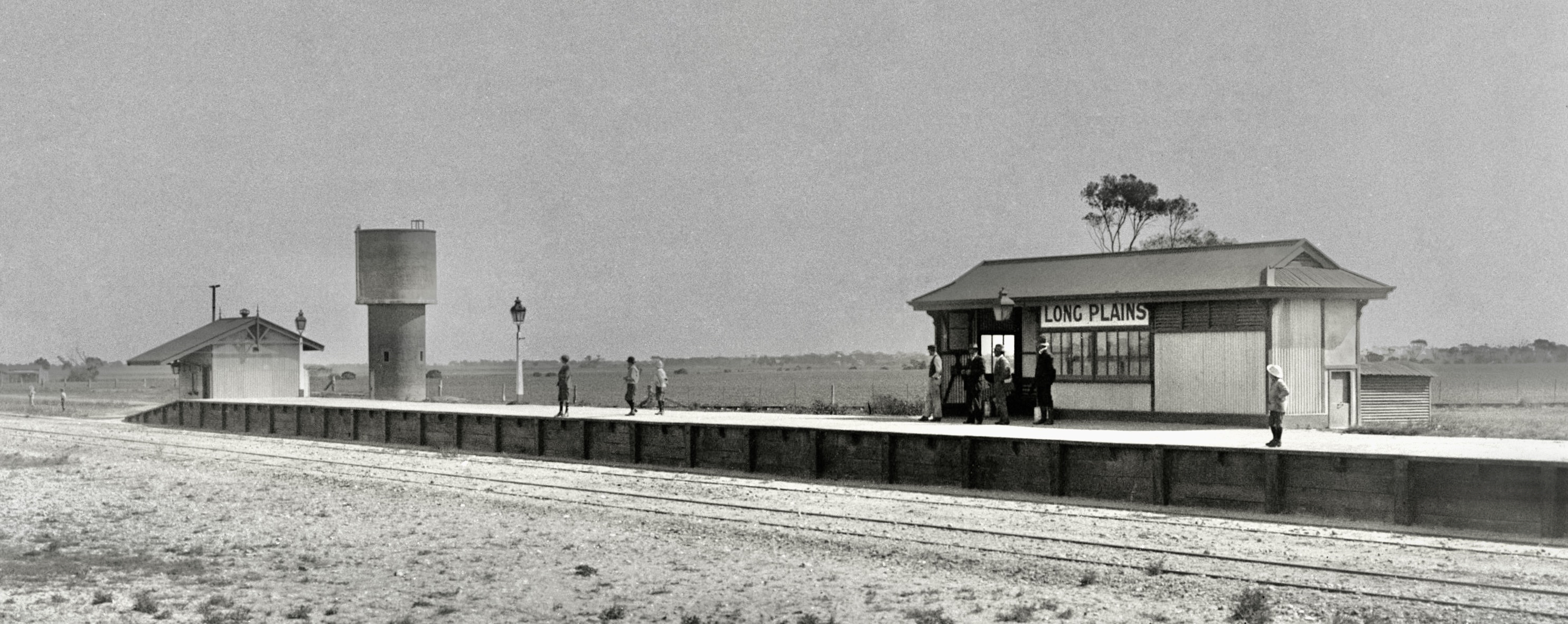
- Long Plains railway station about 1918

General information
- Coordinates: 34.3561°S 138.3776°E
- Owner: South Australian Railways then Australian National Railways Commission
- Line: Adelaide-Port Augusta
- Distance: 75.7 kilometres (47.0 miles) 77.4 kilometres by rail from Adelaide
- Platforms: 1
- Tracks: 1

Construction
- Structure type: Ground

Other information
- Status: Demolished

History
- Opened: 20 April 1917
- Closed: 1980s

Services
Preceding station	Australian Rail Track Corporation	Following station
Calomba towards Adelaide	Adelaide–Port Augusta railway line	Avon towards Port Augusta
Location

Long Plains railway station was located on the Adelaide-Port Augusta railway line serving the small township of Long Plains in South Australia.

== History ==
Long Plains railway station opened on 20 April 1917. The government-owned South Australian Railways started to build the broad-gauge Salisbury–Long Plains line, branching off the Main North line, in 1915; it was completed in 1917. The line was later extended to Redhill from 1917 to 1925, and again from there to Port Pirie in 1937. In the latter year, the Commonwealth Railways extended its standard gauge Trans-Australian Railway line from Port Augusta south to Port Pirie. The line was converted from 1600 mm (5 ft 3 in) broad gauge to 1435 mm (4 ft 8 1/2 in) standard gauge in 1982.

=== Closure ===
Regular passenger services to Port Pirie ceased in the early 1980s, after which the station was demolished. No trace of the facilities remain. Today, passengers on the Indian Pacific who opt for the Barossa Valley excursion disembark the train here, and are later transported to Adelaide by coach for re-boarding.
