= Lameroo railway station =

Former railway station in South Australia, Australia

Lameroo

General information
- Location: Railway Terrace, Lameroo, South Australia
- Coordinates: 35.33057827959299°S 140.51616146776607°E
- Operator: South Australian Railways
- Line: Pinnaroo line
- Distance: 202 kilometres from Adelaide
- Platforms: 1
- Tracks: 1

Construction
- Structure type: Ground

Other information
- Status: Closed

History
- Opened: 14 September 1906
- Closed: 1968

Services
Preceding station	Aurizon	Following station
Wilkawatt towards Adelaide	Pinnaroo railway line, South Australia	Parilla towards Panitya
Location

Lameroo railway station was located on the Pinnaroo railway line. It served the town of Lameroo, South Australia.

== History ==
Lameroo railway station opened on 14 September 1906 when the railway line was opened from Tailem Bend to Pinnaroo. When opened, the station consisted of a main building (an iron shed) and a platform. A goods shed was erected in 1908. The station was rebuilt around 1914. The station closed to regular passengers in 1968. In July 2015, the line through Lameroo became disused after rail haulage was supplanted by road transport. The station office has been preserved as a railway museum.
