= Mallala railway station =

Former railway station in South Australia, Australia

Mallala

General information
- Coordinates: 34.4400670430251°S 138.50843311861536°E
- Operator: Australian National
- Line: Adelaide-Port Augusta
- Distance: 60.5 kilometres from Adelaide
- Platforms: 1
- Tracks: 1

Construction
- Structure type: Ground

Other information
- Status: Closed

History
- Closed: 1983

Services
Preceding station	Australian Rail Track Corporation	Following station
Korunye towards Adelaide	Adelaide–Port Augusta railway line	Calomba towards Port Augusta
Location

Mallala railway station was located on the Adelaide-Port Augusta railway line serving the town of Mallala, South Australia.

== History ==
It is unclear when Mallala station opened. It consisted of a station building and a platform. The station became an important hub for transporting goods and passengers between Adelaide and other regional centres. The railway station was an important link between Mallala and the rest of the state and helped to support the town's economy.

It was served by passenger services to Port Pirie until 1980. The station closed in 1983. There is no longer any trace of the station except the goods crane which still remains on the site.
