= Karoonda railway station =

Former railway station in South Australia, Australia

Karoonda
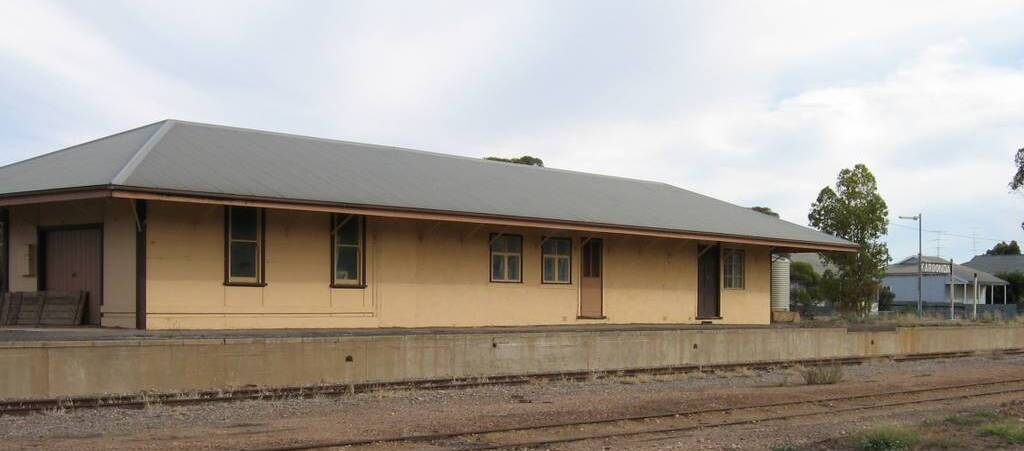
- Karoonda railway station (2007)

General information
- Location: Kr Wilson Drive, Karoonda, South Australia
- Coordinates: 35.095804521053665°S 139.8968087243588°E
- Operator: Australian National
- Line: Loxton line
- Distance: 147 kilometres from Adelaide
- Platforms: 1
- Tracks: 1

Construction
- Structure type: Ground

Other information
- Status: Closed

History
- Opened: 1906
- Closed: 31 October 1987

Services
Preceding station	Aurizon	Following station
Wingamin towards Adelaide	Loxton railway line	Borrika towards Loxton
Preceding station	Australian National Railways Commission	Following station
Terminus	Waikerie railway line	Mindiyarra towards Waikerie
Terminus	Peebinga railway line	Nunkeri towards Peebinga
Location

Karoonda railway station was located at the junction of the Peebinga railway line, Waikerie railway line and the Barmera railway line. It served the town of Karoonda.

== History ==
Karoonda railway station opened in 1906 with the opening of the Brown's Well railway line to Meribah. It became a junction station with the opening of the Waikerie railway line on 23 September 1914 and the Peebinga railway line in December the same year.

The station was a busy place with porters, staff, goods and maintenance sheds, refreshment rooms, passengers, and trains shunting everywhere.

The station closed to regular traffic on 31 October 1987. Part of the Brown's Well railway line plus most of the Loxton railway line spur from Alawoona were converted to standard gauge and remained as the Loxton railway line, used to carry part of the seasonal grain harvest. The rest of the line and branches were closed in the 1990s. The Loxton line closed on 20 July 2015, with all grain traffic now taken by road.
