= Beachport railway station =

Former railway station in South Australia, Australia

Beachport

General information
- Location: Railway Terrace, Beachport, South Australia
- Coordinates: 37.47848636898985°S 140.01096420878986°E
- Operator: South Australian Railways
- Line: Beachport line
- Distance: 381 kilometres from Adelaide
- Platforms: 1
- Tracks: 1

Construction
- Structure type: Ground

Other information
- Status: Closed to passengers, repurposed as the Beachport Bowling Club

History
- Opened: 1878
- Closed: 1957
Location

Beachport railway station was the terminus of the Beachport railway line. It served the town of Beachport.

== History ==
Beachport station opened in 1878 when narrow gauge railway was built from the port on Rivoli Bay at what is now Beachport inland via Millicent to Mount Gambier. The line was initially used for both freight and passenger traffic. It spanned right across the jetty and some spur lines into the Grain and Wool Store, the sheep yards and a chicory kiln. The rail yards were huge with the station being supported by passenger and freight sheds, repair workshops and accommodations for the South Australian Railways employees. The station consisted of a station master's residence and a waiting room. The waiting room and residence were weatherboard and had a metal tiled roof, which replaced a corrugated galvanized iron roof. The residence had an M-shaped gable end with louvred ventilators. Modern additions adjoined the northern and southern ends. The waiting room had a dressed stone chimney.

The station closed in 1957 when the line was converted to broad gauge and was cut back to terminate at Millicent. The line through Beachport was removed but the station building was retained as a bowling club and the old wool and grain store has been preserved and today serves as a National Trust museum.
