= Mount Gambier railway station =

Former railway station in South Australia, Australia

Mount Gambier
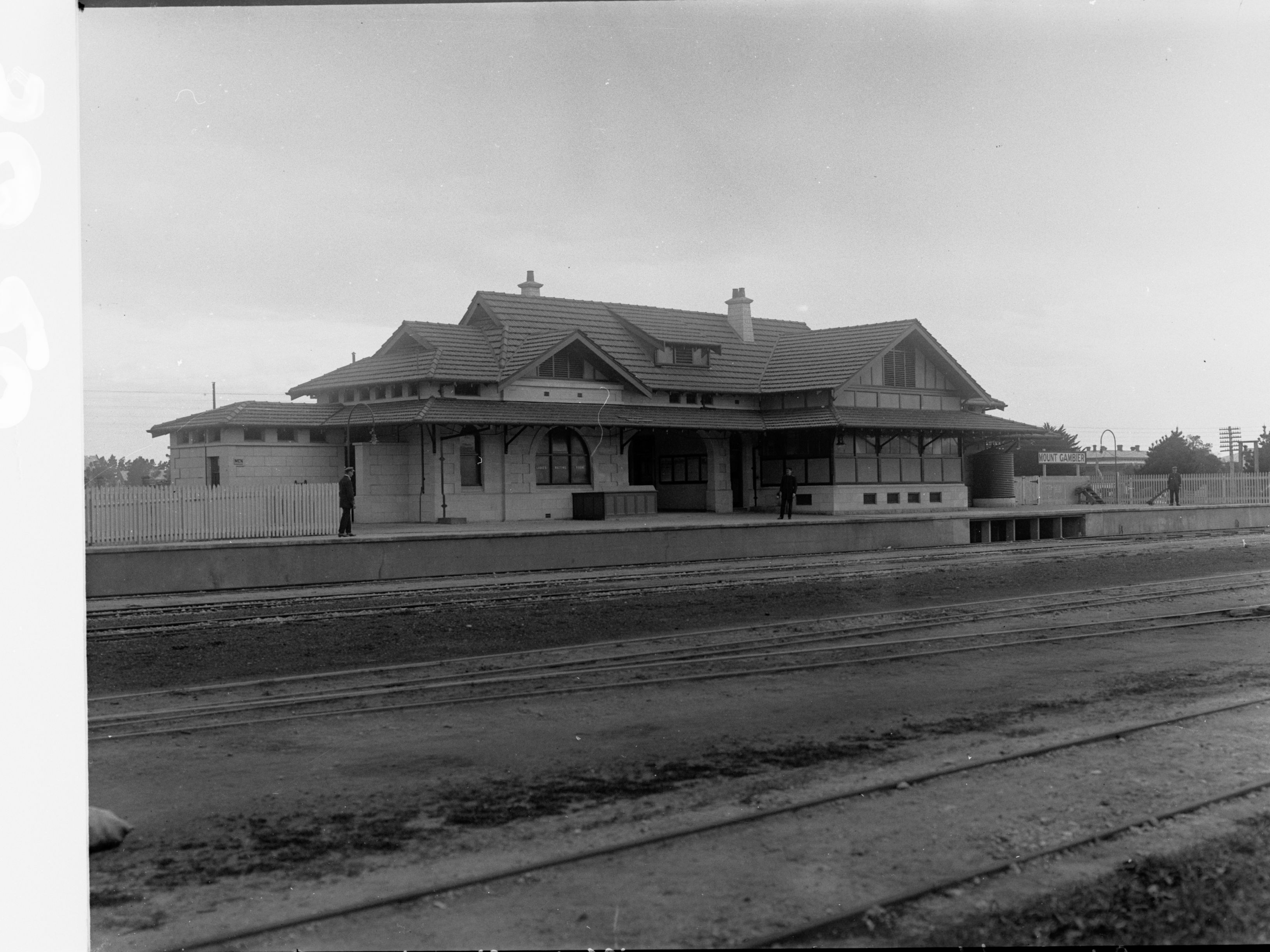
- The Mount Gambier railway station building in 1918.

General information
- Location: Railway Terrace, Mount Gambier
- Coordinates: 37°49′50″S 140°46′33″E
- Operator: Australian National
- Lines: Naracoorte–Millicent; Mount Gambier-Heywood
- Distance: 221 kilometres from Adelaide
- Platforms: 2 (1 island)

Construction
- Structure type: Ground

Other information
- Status: Closed to rail services; repurposed as a community park

History
- Opened: 20 May 1879
- Closed: 31 December 1990 (passengers); 12 April 1995 (freight); 28 June 2006 (tourist)

Services
Preceding station	Limestone Coast Railway	Following station
Wandilo towards Adelaide	Mount Gambier railway line	Terminus
Terminus	Beachport railway line	Compton towards Beachport
Terminus	Mount Gambier-Heywood railway line	Murrawa towards Heywood
Location

Mount Gambier railway station was the terminus of the Mount Gambier railway line and the junction for the Beachport and Mount Gambier-Heywood railway lines in the South Australian city of Mount Gambier. It was last used in 2006, and has since been transformed into a public community space.

== History ==
In 1879, a narrow 3 ft 6 in (1,067 mm) gauge line opened from Beachport (Rivoli Bay North) through Millicent to Mount Gambier. In 1887, the Mount Gambier railway line was constructed to Naracoorte (connecting to the Kingston-Naracoorte railway line) and Wolseley, where it joined the Adelaide-Wolseley line.

On 28 November 1917, a broad gauge line opened from Mount Gambier to Heywood near Portland. In the 1950s, the narrow gauge lines were converted to broad gauge.

Mount Gambier had an extensive goods yard and a locomotive depot with a roundhouse.

Ownership of the station and the railway lines was transferred to Australian National in 1978. The station closed on 31 December 1990 when the Bluebird railcar passenger service, known as the Blue Lake, ceased operating, along with every intrastate passenger services in South Australia but the lines were still used by freight. When the Adelaide-Melbourne railway line was converted to standard gauge, the Mount Gambier, Heywood and Millicent lines remained as broad gauge, consequentially becoming isolated and were closed to remaining freight services on 12 April 1995.

In the late 1990s to mid 2000s, the Limestone Coast Railway, operated tourist services on the abandoned lines from Mount Gambier to Penola, Coonawarra, Tantanoola, Millicent and Rennick with Redhen railcars. However, due to increased insurance costs, the service ceased 1 July 2006, with the last service being a train to Tantanoola on 28 June 2006.

In 2013, the old yard was lifted and covered with grass. The station building was then operated by radio station Lime FM.

In 2015, after over a year of work, the Railway Lands was completely transformed into a public community space. 20,000 square metres of turf covered the entire former-industrial site. The grand opening in November saw thousands of residents come together to utilise the area. A "back to nature" playground, wheelchair-accessible barbecues, a pond with a creek, native plants, a labyrinth, plus many more features for the community to use. Mount Gambier City Council plan to use the area for a number of annual events, but encourage local community groups to also activate the area. This, in turn, permanently disconnects the Heywood line from the Millicent and Naracoorte lines except for a two track easement through to give right of way for any future standardisation.

In 2018, the roundhouse was demolished after being damaged by fire in 2014. Timber from the roundhouse was reused at a different roundhouse in Peterborough during its restoration from 2021 to 2022.

In 2020, the station building was restored to original condition by the City of Mount Gambier Council.

== Services ==
Mount Gambier station was served from Adelaide by an overnight mixed train until October 1985 and then by a service using Bluebird railcars until December 1990. Today, Mount Gambier is connected to the Victorian rail service via a V/Line coach service to and from Warrnambool.

== See also ==
- Rail transport in South Australia
- Rail transport in Victoria
