= Naracoorte railway station =

Former railway station in South Australia, Australia

Naracoorte
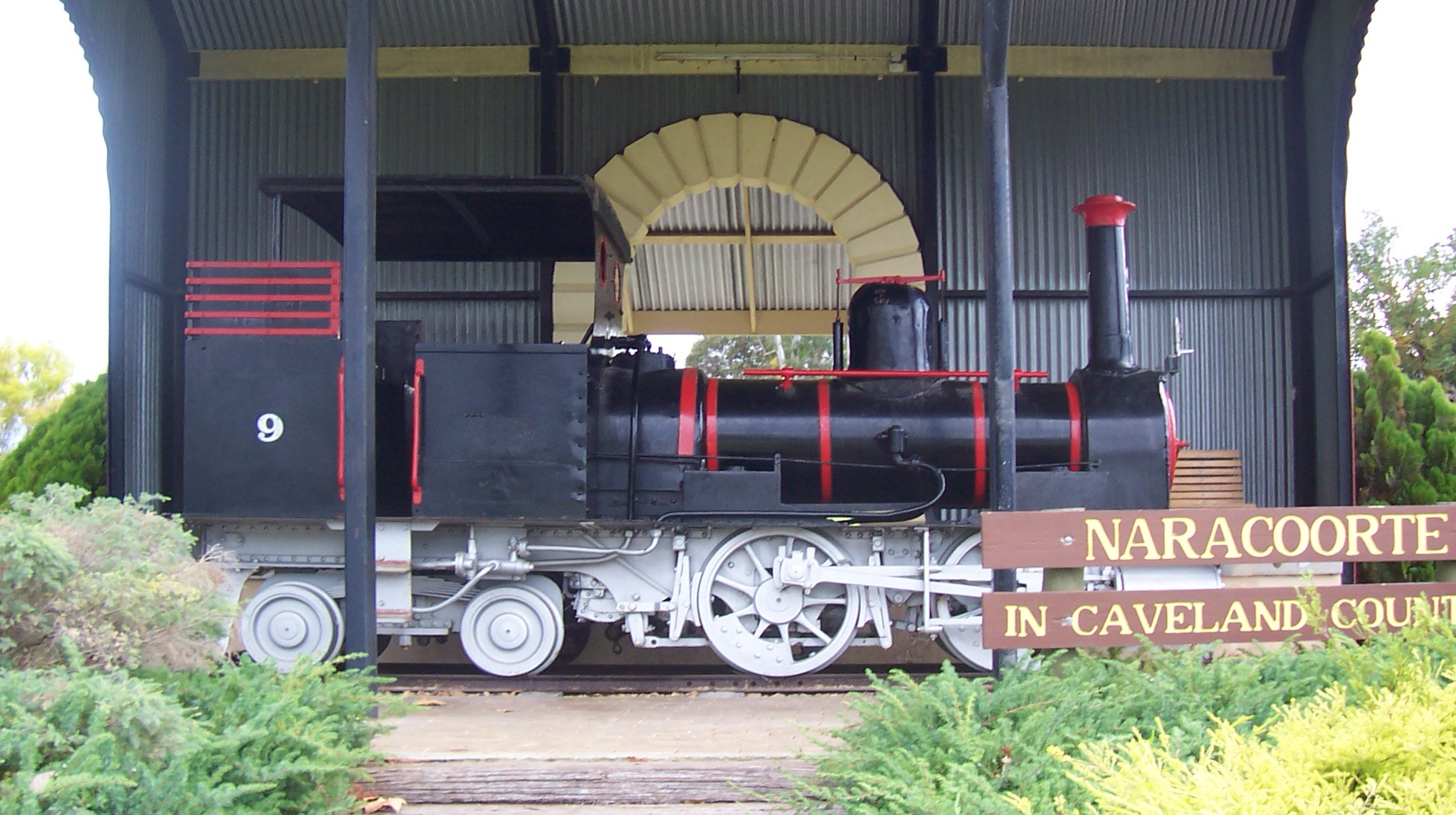
- A South Australian Railways V class locomotive, which ran on the Naracoorte–Kingston line between 1877 and 1888, is on display in Naracoorte

General information
- Location: Smith Street, Naracoorte, South Australia
- Coordinates: 36.95635230212345°S 140.7377218983094°E
- Operator: Australian National
- Line: Mount Gambier line
- Distance: 334 kilometres from Adelaide
- Platforms: 1
- Tracks: 1

Construction
- Structure type: Ground

Other information
- Status: Closed

History
- Opened: 1876
- Closed: 31 December 1990 (passengers); 12 April 1995 (freight)

Services
Preceding station	Australian National Railways Commission	Following station
Hynam towards Adelaide	Mount Gambier railway line	Struan towards Mount Gambier
Terminus	Kingston-Naracoorte railway line	Stewart Range towards Kingston SE
Location

Naracoorte railway station was located on the junction of the Mount Gambier railway line and the Kingston SE railway line. It served the town of Naracoorte.

== History ==
Naracoorte railway station opened in 1876 when an isolated narrow gauge railway line was opened in 1876 from the port at Kingston SE inland via Lucindale to Naracoorte as narrow gauge. For the first six months after the line was completed, no locomotives were available, so wagons on the line were towed by horses. It became a junction with the opening of another narrow-gauge railway line to Tatiara (now Wolseley) on 21 September 1881. The line was later extended south towards Mount Gambier on 14 June 1887.

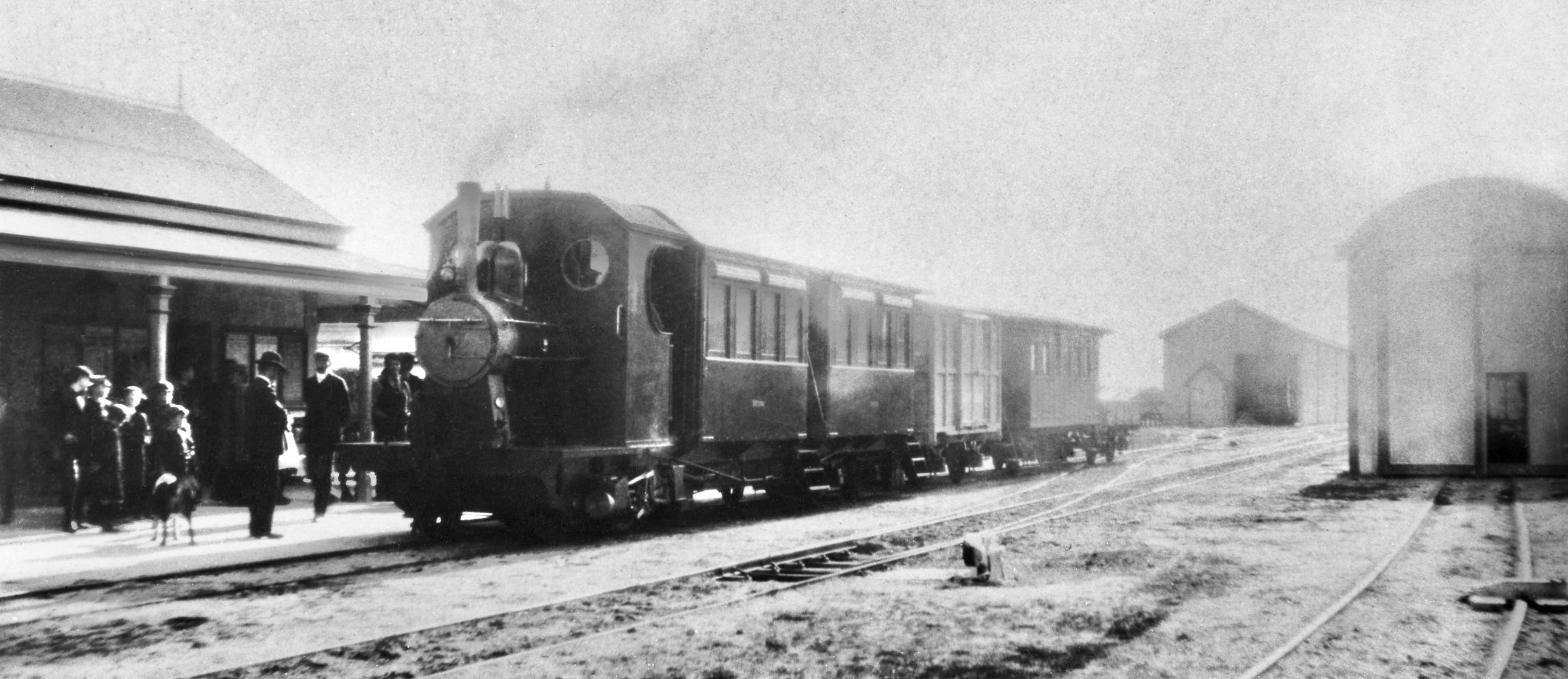
Passengers are ready for an early morning departure of the South Australian Railways Steam Motor Coach no. 2 with 3 cars behind. The lines on which this railcar operated were generally flat, so it was possible, despite having only one driven axle, for it to haul other rail vehicles

Naracoorte became a break of gauge station in 1953 when the Mount Gambier line was gauge converted to broad gauge in 1953 being a dual gauge line then with the narrow gauge being completely removed by 1959. It ceased to be a break of gauge station in 1957 when the line to Kingston was also converted to broad gauge.

The current station building was built in the 1950s.

Naracoorte ceased to be a junction station on 28 November 1987, with the closure of the line between Naracoorte and Kingston. The station closed on 31 December 1990 when the Adelaide-Mount Gambier passenger service ceased but the line still continued to be used by freight. When the Adelaide-Melbourne railway line was converted to standard gauge, the Mount Gambier line was not converted and closed on 12 April 1995.
