= Coonawarra, South Australia =

Coonawarra
- Town
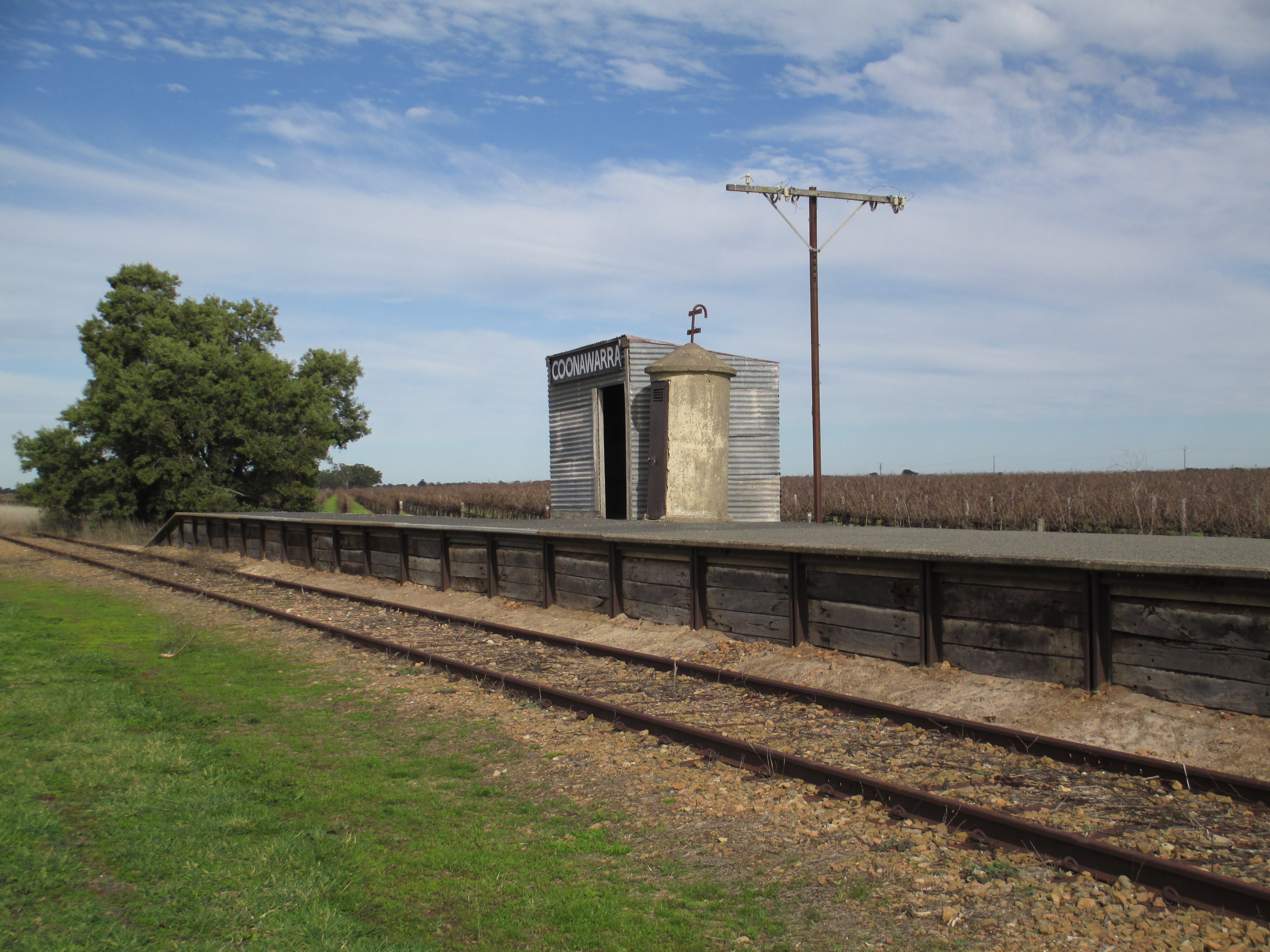
- Coonawarra railway station, looking south

- Coordinates: 37°17′31″S 140°49′59″E
- Country: Australia
- State: South Australia
- Region: Limestone Coast
- LGA: Wattle Range Council
- Location: 331 km (206 mi) SE of Adelaide; 60 km (37 mi) N of Mount Gambier
- Established: 13 December 2001 (locality)

Government
  - State electorate: MacKillop
  - Federal division: Barker
- Elevation: 57 m (187 ft)

Population
  - Total: 135 (SAL 2021)
- Time zone: UTC+9:30 (ACST)
  - Summer (DST): UTC+10:30 (ACST)
- Postcode: 5263
- County: Robe
- Mean max temp: 20.5 °C (68.9 °F)
- Mean min temp: 8.1 °C (46.6 °F)
- Annual rainfall: 568.7 mm (22.39 in)
Localities around Coonawarra
Maaoup	Glenroy; Comaum
Maaoup	Coonawarra	Dorodong
Monbulla	Penola	Lake Mundi
- Locations; Adjoining localities

Coonawarra is a small town north of Penola in South Australia. It is best known for the Coonawarra wine region named after it.

The Aboriginal Australians living in the area when Europeans arrived were the Bindjali people, The word coonawarra is reported to have been their word for honeysuckle, although this meaning has also been ascribed to Penola by the same source. An alternative origin to the name is still rooted in the local indigenous language: "The name of John Riddock’s fruit colony, started by him in 1895. "Coon" being the aboriginal word for "big lip", and "warra," for "house," and was applied by natives to a house in the locality in which a man with a remarkably big lip lived".

Coonawarra was a station on the Mount Gambier railway line, which opened in 1887 and operated until it closed to freight on 12 April 1995. The Limestone Coast Railway tourist trains stopped at the station from Mount Gambier until 20 March 1999.

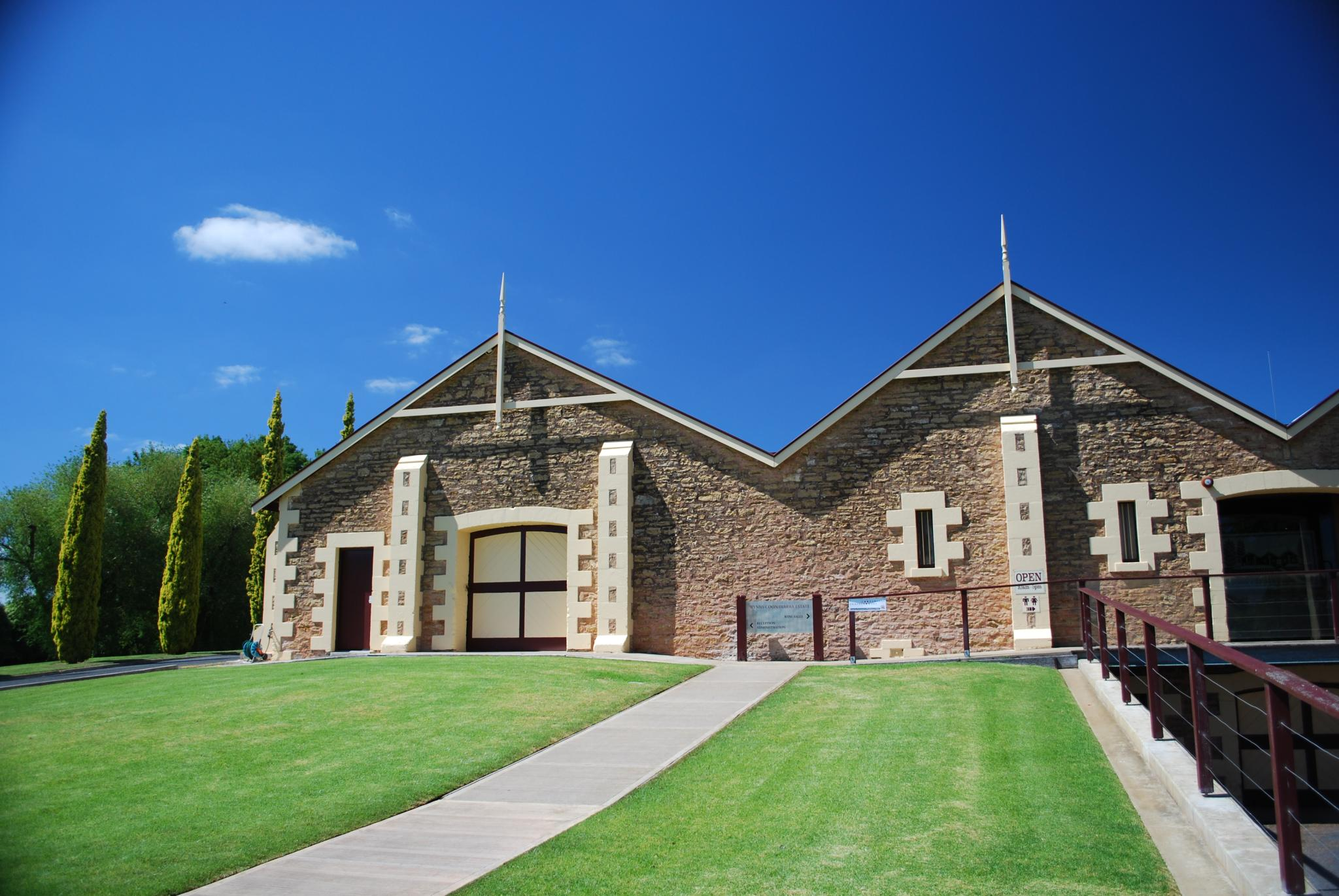
Wynns Coonawarra – Cellar Door

The township of Coonawarra is a few hundred metres west of the Riddoch Highway which passes along the ridge in the middle of the Coonawarra wine region. The historic Wynn's Coonawarra Winery in Memorial Drive is listed on the South Australian Heritage Register.

== Climate ==
Climate data for Coonawarra, elevation 57 m (187 ft), (1991–2020 normals, extremes 1985–present)
Month	Jan	Feb	Mar	Apr	May	Jun	Jul	Aug	Sep	Oct	Nov	Dec	Year
Record high °C (°F)	45.2 (113.4)	43.6 (110.5)	40.8 (105.4)	36.2 (97.2)	29.9 (85.8)	23.2 (73.8)	23.2 (73.8)	25.5 (77.9)	31.2 (88.2)	35.8 (96.4)	37.9 (100.2)	45.8 (114.4)	45.8 (114.4)
Mean daily maximum °C (°F)	27.7 (81.9)	27.6 (81.7)	24.9 (76.8)	21.0 (69.8)	17.1 (62.8)	14.5 (58.1)	13.9 (57.0)	14.9 (58.8)	16.9 (62.4)	19.8 (67.6)	22.8 (73.0)	25.3 (77.5)	20.5 (68.9)
Mean daily minimum °C (°F)	11.8 (53.2)	12.0 (53.6)	10.2 (50.4)	7.6 (45.7)	6.8 (44.2)	5.3 (41.5)	5.2 (41.4)	5.3 (41.5)	6.4 (43.5)	7.4 (45.3)	8.9 (48.0)	10.2 (50.4)	8.1 (46.6)
Record low °C (°F)	0.2 (32.4)	0.8 (33.4)	0.0 (32.0)	−2.2 (28.0)	−4.7 (23.5)	−3.8 (25.2)	−3.4 (25.9)	−3.6 (25.5)	−2.6 (27.3)	−2.2 (28.0)	−0.2 (31.6)	0.2 (32.4)	−4.7 (23.5)
Average precipitation mm (inches)	28.7 (1.13)	19.2 (0.76)	26.3 (1.04)	36.4 (1.43)	55.6 (2.19)	72.4 (2.85)	76.8 (3.02)	80.7 (3.18)	64.9 (2.56)	41.8 (1.65)	37.6 (1.48)	34.0 (1.34)	575.1 (22.64)
Average precipitation days (≥ 0.2 mm)	6.9	6.1	8.5	11.8	17.0	18.6	20.6	20.6	19.1	14.2	11.2	10.4	165.0
Average afternoon relative humidity (%)	38	38	41	49	62	69	69	63	60	53	48	43	53
Source: Australian Bureau of Meteorology (humidity 1991–2010)
