= Limestone Coast Railway =

Coordinates: 37°49′46″S 140°46′58″E

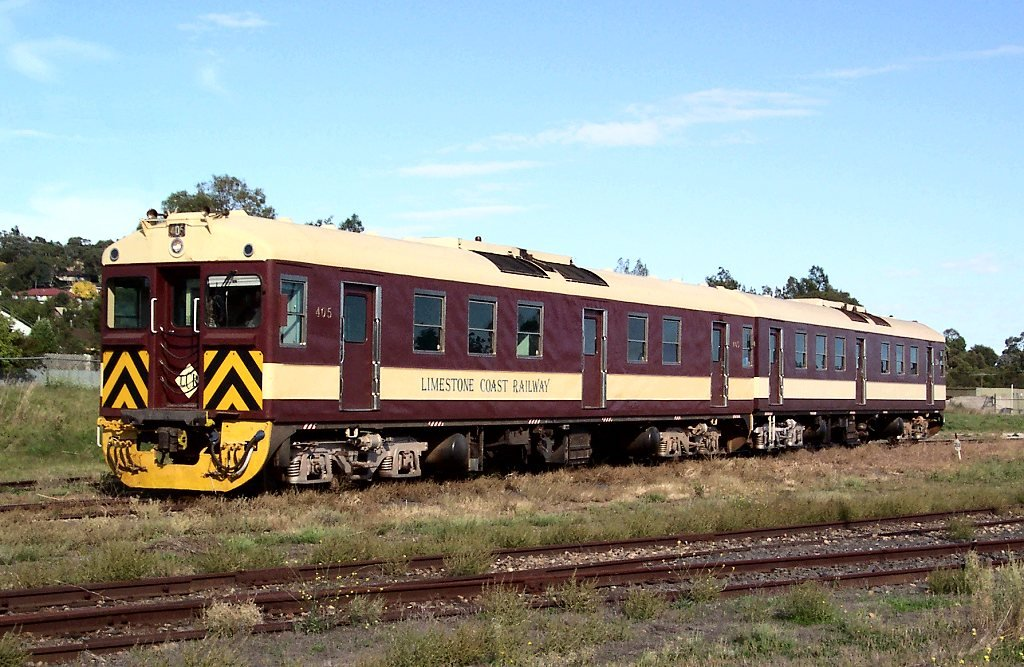
- Limestone Coast Railway Redhens 400 and 300 class, April 2003. Units 405 & 334. Attribution: John Masson

Overview
- Service type: Heritage railway
- Status: Closed
- Locale: Limestone Coast, South Australia
- First service: 1998
- Last service: 2006
- Website: Archived website

Route
- Lines used: Mount Gambier - Penola; Mount Gambier - Millicent

Technical
- Rolling stock: Four South Australian Railways Redhen railcar
- Track gauge: 5 ft 3 in (1,600 mm)

The Limestone Coast Railway was a tourist railway in the Australian state of South Australia which, from 1998 to 2006, operated a tourist service from Mount Gambier to stations on local 5 ft 3 in (1,600 mm) gauge railway lines which had been closed in April 1995. The stations included Coonawarra and Penola on the Mount Gambier line, Millicent and Tantanoola on the Mount Gambier to Millicent line and Rennick on the Mount Gambier-Heywood railway line.

The railway operated four ex-South Australian Railways Redhen railcars, purchased from the Government of South Australia during the years 1997 to 1999.

Due to problems with public liability insurance, it was forced to suspend operations in about the year 2000. It resumed a limited service to Penola and Tantanoola, but again suspended its operations as of 1 July 2006.

All rail operations ceased as of December 2006. A letter dated 11 October 2007, sent to members and volunteers, said that the railway would cease to exist as an operating entity as from 31 October 2007 and would surrender its lease of the lines it operated over. The Redhen railcars ended up at Steamranger Heritage Railway and were transferred between 2012 and 2013.

== See also ==
- List of heritage railways in Australia
