= South Australian Railways Redhen railcar =

Class of Australian railcar / diesel multiple unit

Red Hen railcar
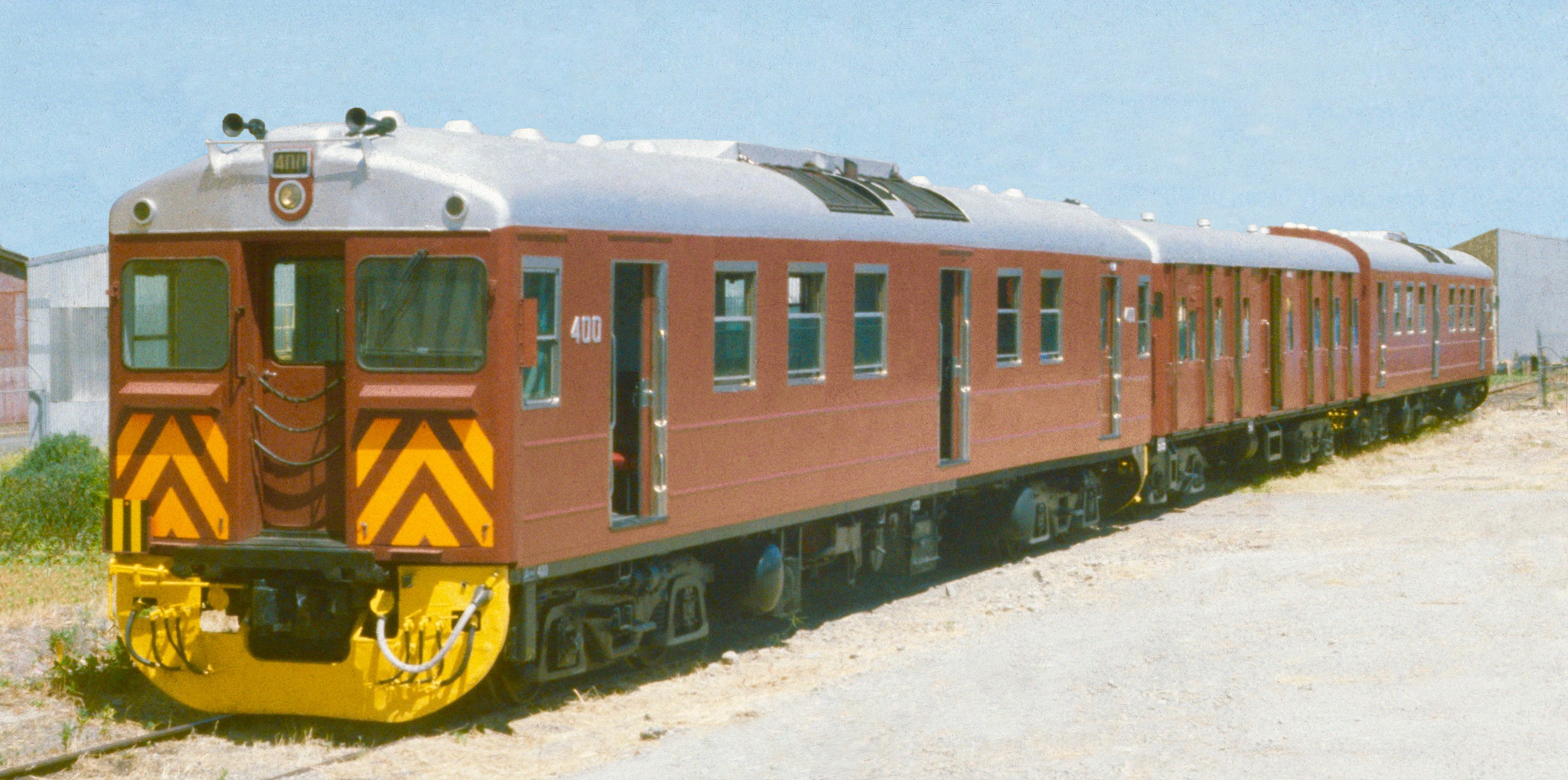
- A typical 3-car Red Hen consist in original livery at the National Railway Museum, Port Adelaide: 400 class double-ended power car no. 400, 860 class trailer no. 875, and a 300 class single-ended power car no. 321

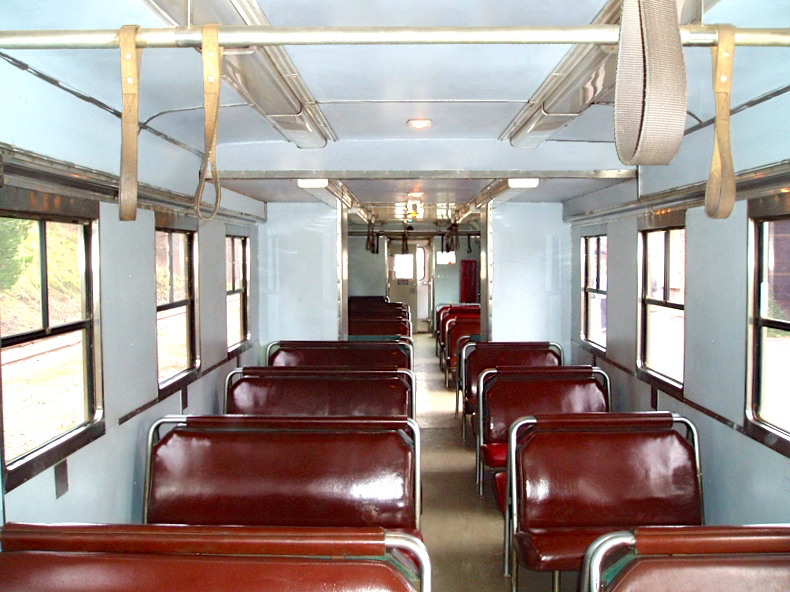
- Manufacturer: South Australian Railways
- Built at: Islington Railway Workshops
- Replaced: Brill railcars
- Constructed: 1955-1971
- Entered service: 1955-1996
- Number built: 111
- Number preserved: 27
- Formation: 1/2/3 carriages
- Fleet numbers: 300-373, 400-436
- Capacity: 300-341: 91; 362-373: 89; 400-419: 80; 420-436: 78
- Operators: South Australian Railways; State Transport Authority; TransAdelaide

Specifications
- Car length: 20.00 m (65 ft 7 in)
- Width: 3.05 m (10 ft 0 in)
- Height: 4.27 m (14 ft 0 in)
- Wheel diameter: 914 millimetres (36 in)
- Maximum speed: 88 km/h (55 mph)
- Prime mover(s): 2 x GM model 6/71: 300-341, 362-373, 400-436; 2 x Rolls-Royce C6SFLH: 342-361
- Braking system(s): Westinghouse air brakes
- Track gauge: 1,600 mm (5 ft 3 in)

The Redhen railcars (originally, Red Hen) was the nickname given to the 300 and 400 classes of diesel-hydraulic railcars designed by the South Australian Railways and built at its Islington Railway Workshops between 1955 and 1971. The railcars, which operated in Adelaide suburban service until 1996, remain a nostalgic part of South Australian memory. Some continue to be operated by the SteamRanger Heritage Railway, the National Railway Museum, Port Adelaide and other railway preservation entities.

== Configuration ==
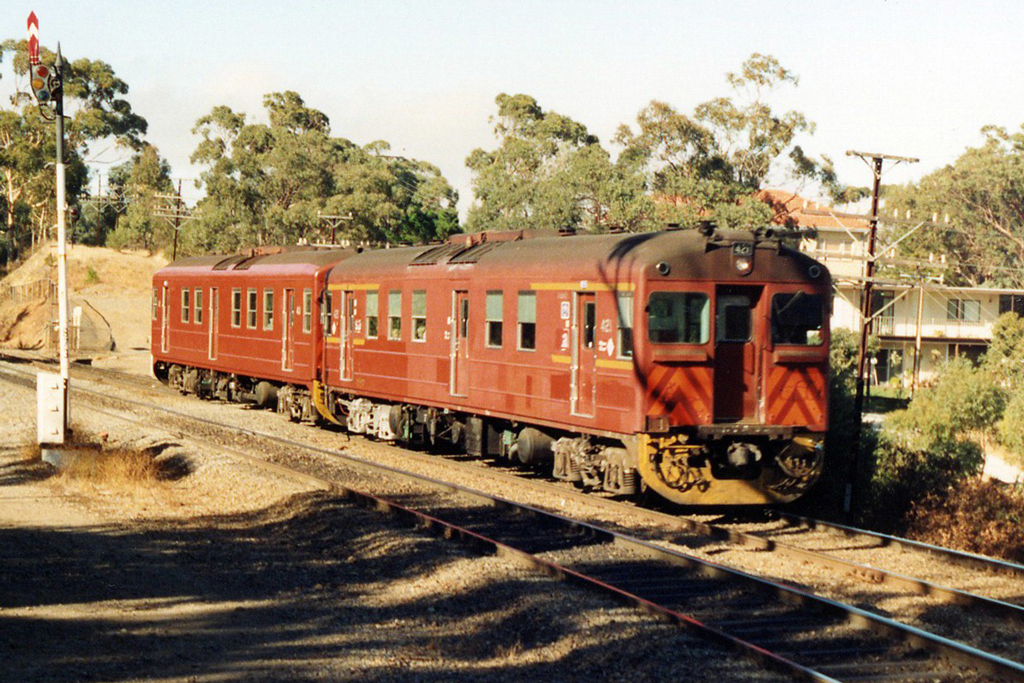
Two double-ended 400 class Red Hens working a Belair line service in 1990

The power cars comprised two designs:

- 300 class railcars had a driving cab at one end only, requiring them to run in consists of at least two cars; in practice, almost without exception, they operated in pairs with a trailer car coupled between them.
- 400 class railcars had driving cabs at both ends and a guard station at the B end, so that they could be used as a single car when needed, or in multiple with other cars to make up longer trains.

Unpowered trailer cars were of two types:

- 860 class: 24 cars converted from 800 and 850 class steel side-loading suburban cars built in 1944 (operated from 1955 to 1987)
- 820 class: 13 cars converted from wooden, clerestory-roofed end-loading suburban cars (operated from 1961 to 1976).

== Service history ==
=== Construction ===
300 class
| Running numbers | Dates introduced | Weight (tonnes) | Seating capacity |
|---|---|---|---|
| 300–341 | 1955–58 | 40.7 | 91 |
| 342–361 | 1959–61 | 42.7 | 91 |
| 362–373 | 1968–70 | 41.9 | 84 |

The first Redhens were introduced by the South Australian Railways in October 1955 to replace ageing suburban steam locomotive hauled trains in Adelaide. Construction of Redhen vehicles continued until 1971, when the latest examples were built to supersede 1920s-era diesel railcars. The Redhens were built in three batches. The overall design of the railcars was very similar, but there were differences in detail between the batches. Several railcars in the 300 class were re-numbered later in life, taking on the numbers of written-off or modified units. The exterior of the units was always painted red, with variations in the colour of roofs and bogies over the years. The interior design and layout remained largely unchanged throughout their life. Some 300 class units were modified to provide guard's accommodation or space for bikes when the 860 class trailers were withdrawn in 1987. This slightly reduced the seating capacity of these modified cars.

Redhen railcar Horn

=== Deployment ===
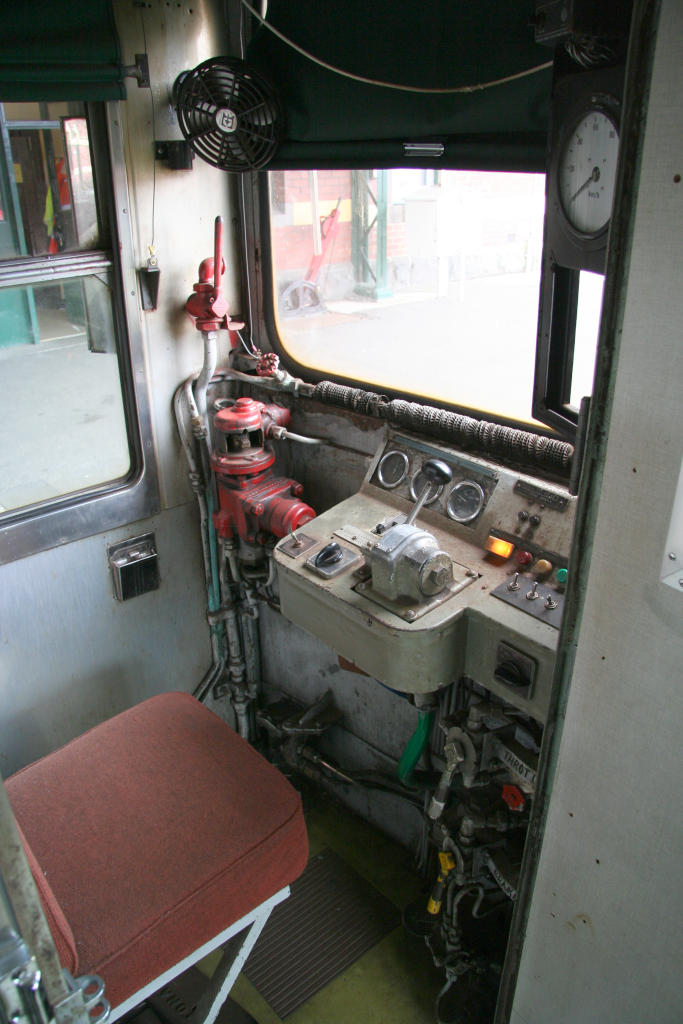
Cab of 402 at the South Gippsland Railway

When first introduced, all the 300 class Redhens were formed as 3-car consists, comprising an 820 or 860 class trailer sandwiched between two powered 300 class railcars. In peak hours, two sets were coupled together to form 6-car trains. On rare occasions, at times of heavy traffic demand, trains of Redhens could be up to nine cars long.

Instead of building trailer cars to work with the 300 class cars, the South Australian Railways chose to convert existing rolling stock. To operate with 300 to 347, five 800 class and nineteen 850 class carriages were converted, becoming the 860 class. These steel cars had been built at Islington Railway Workshops between 1944 and 1946 as part of a plan to electrify Adelaide's suburban railways.

For use with 348 to 373, thirteen 327 class wooden end loading suburban baggage cars were converted, becoming the 820 class trailers. These had been built between 1912 and 1924.

400 class
| Unit numbers | Dates introduced | Weight (tonnes) | Seating capacity |
|---|---|---|---|
| 400–419 | 1959–61 | 42.5 | 80 |
| 420–436 | 1968–71 | 42.5 | 78 |

The 400 class were used as single cars on the main lines during the evenings and at most other times on lightly patronised services such as the Grange, Tonsley and Northfield lines. They were also used in multiple with other 300 or 400 class units.

These railcars became the backbone of the metropolitan services, relegating most loco hauled passenger trains to regional and interstate services.

=== 2300/2500 class ("Superchook") variant ===
Following the introduction of the 2000 class railcars in 1980, two 300 class Redhens and an 860 class trailer were chosen for an experimental rebuild at STA's Regency Park workshops. Nos 300, 337 and 862 were modified in 1983 with new interiors, elevated cabs and stainless steel panelling similar to the 2000 class. The rebuilt cars were re-numbered 2301, 2302 and 2501 and entered service in June 1983. They soon acquired the nickname, Superchooks (a play on "Redhen" – a chook, in Australian vernacular, is a chicken) The exercise was not successful and no more were modified. The Superchooks saw only limited passenger service and often 2301-2302 was sandwiched in between two 400 class Redhens. They were withdrawn in 1992.

=== Withdrawal ===
All thirteen of the 820 class trailers were retired by December 1976. The corresponding 300 class Redhens were then coupled to a 400 class railcar to form 2-car trains (designated 300/400 class). In 1987, the steel-bodied 860 class trailers were withdrawn and all the 300 class Redhens were reconfigured as 2-car trains, usually consecutively numbered pairs.

The first group withdrawal of Redhen railcars and 860 trailers occurred when 6 300 class railcars and 2 860 trailers were condemned in 1984, following the delivery of 30 2000 class railcars from 1979 to 1981. In 1987/88 the State Transport Authority introduced the first of its new fleet of 3000 class railcars, which were intended to replace the Redhens. As more 3000 class were delivered through the early 1990s, mass withdrawals of Redhens commenced and they were gradually restricted to operating only during weekday peak hours. This was especially the case when driver only operation (DOO) was introduced in the early 1990s. The manual sliding doors made Redhens unsuitable for DOO and guards had to be retained to supervise passenger boarding and alighting.

By January 1996, only 16 remained in service, confined to peak-hour Gawler, Outer Harbor and Tonsley services. The last Redhens in service were 428 and 436.

== Preservation history ==
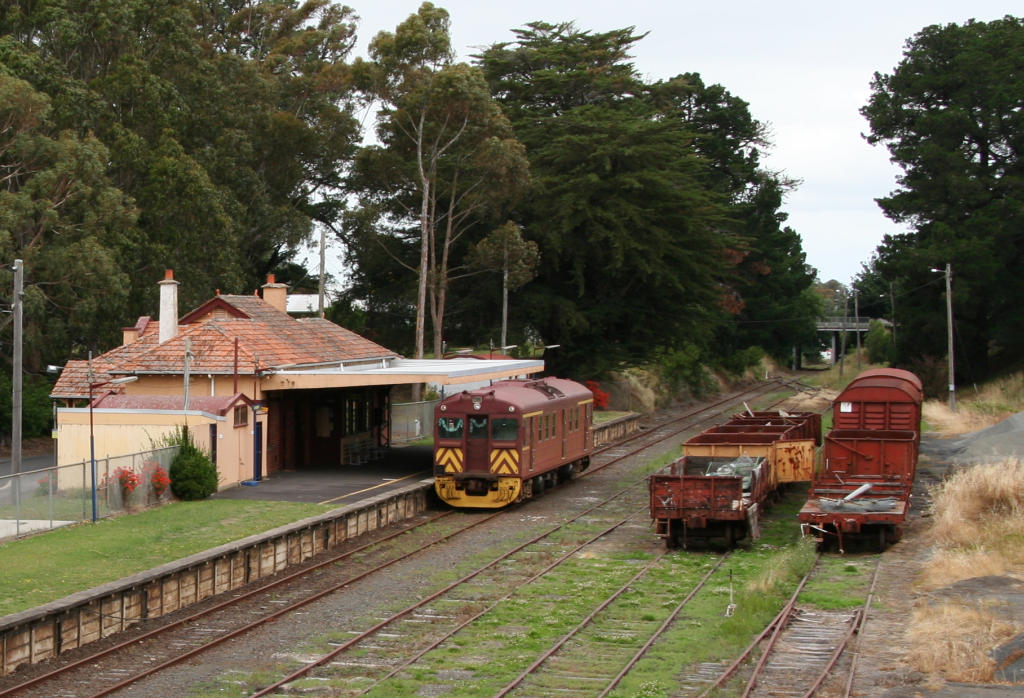
402 at Leongatha on the South Gippsland Railway in December 2008

=== Barossa Valley Junction Motel ===
The first Redhens to be preserved were 303, 328, 329, 333, 338, 354, and trailers 877 and 881 which were moved to the Barossa Valley Junction Motel at Tanunda in 1986. They were converted for use as accommodation and had most operational parts stripped as a result. The Motel continued operating until 2014, when the owners retired and closed the motel. Everything at the site was auctioned off, with all rolling stock sold to private buyers and being dispersed across Australia. Redhens 303 and 338 were moved to land adjacent to the northwest boundary of the Blackwood railway station, and were repainted to the original silver roof and red body livery by their new owners. 329 and 354 were moved to Blewitt Springs, now used as accommodation known as "redhens". 333 went to the Two Wells area, while trailer car 877 was moved to Hallett and currently serves as accommodation for hikers on the Heysen Trail.

=== South Gippsland Railway ===
The Superchook set consisting of 2301, 2501 and 2302 were moved to The South Gippsland Tourist Railway (SGR) in Victoria in 1994 and operated there for a few years. In 1995, railcars 311, 366, 373, 402, 416, and 436 were also moved to the SGR. In December 1999, railcars 436, 366, 373, 2302, trailer 2501, 2301 and 416 were transferred from storage at Nyora to Bendigo for a new tourist operation named Centrail, while 311 and 402 remained at the SGR operating services. The railcars had a test run in 2001, but they came under CFCLA's ownership in 2002 after the collapse of Centrail's owner, Great Northern Rail. 366 was moved to Australian Train Movers in NSW. In 2003 CFCLA swapped the railcars with Yorke Peninsula Railway locomotive T387, with all railcars but 436 being moved to Wallaroo for operation on the railway. 436 was stripped of parts and scrapped, having suffered an arson attack during its time at Bendigo. 366 was moved back to Bendigo in 2015. Upon closure of the SGR in 2016, 311 and 402 were originally given to Mornington Railway, but they changed hands again in August 2020, when they were privately acquired with the intention to restore them in South Australia. They were moved to private property in May 2022.

=== National Railway Museum ===
The National Railway Museum (NRM) received trailer car 875 in 1987, and it was restored in 1995 for use with the TransAdelaide special set, which included railcars 321 and 400. The set was used on the metropolitan network until 15 December 1996, when it was moved to the NRM for preservation. The full set was last used in 2006 for the 150th anniversary of the opening of the Adelaide - Port Adelaide line, with 875 returning to display afterwards. 321 and 400 were used for shuttles from the museum to Adelaide railway station from 2013 to 2015. They have since been restricted to running on the NRM's 1 km portion of track due to the high cost of getting them accredited for running on the Adelaide Metro rail network. 875 was given to SteamRanger due to a loss of space in the museum caused by the impending extension of Adelaide Metro rail services to the site.

=== SteamRanger Heritage Railway ===
SteamRanger Heritage Railway restored trailer car 824 in 1985, and it was joined by railcar 412 in 1995. The transfer movement of 412 from SteamRanger's Dry Creek depot to their Goolwa depot became the last passenger train to operate between Adelaide and Victor Harbor. In early 2012, 412 was legally painted into a graffiti livery for the 'Just Add Water' festival in Goolwa, the car was painted again in another graffiti livery by the same artists in late 2012 for the 2013 festival before returning to its Regal Red in late 2014. 428 and 364 moved to SteamRanger by road later in 1997, and 428 became operational in 1998 and 364 remained stored. 428 was given a unique livery in 2000, based on the mustard pot livery used by numerous SAR diesel locomotives. This livery was never worn by Redhens while in service. In 2006, the Council of Port Adelaide and Enfield offered SteamRanger wooden trailer 830, which was displayed at the historic wharf area in Port Adelaide. SteamRanger took up the offer, and transported it to their Mount Barker depot later that year. It remains stored awaiting restoration. SteamRanger took delivery of ex-Limestone Coast Railway railcars 334, 405, and 424 in 2014, as well as trailer 820 which was damaged by fire as a result of an arson attack, destroying everything but the frame and bogies. 820 has since been delivered to Strathalbyn where it remains stored. The LCR railcars and trailers were previously stored in the roundhouse at Mount Gambier. SteamRanger did not get steel trailer 874 from the LCR, which was instead scrapped. In February 2019 however, they received steel trailer 875 from the NRM, and it entered service in late 2023. In May 2023, Steamranger's 4 car Redhen set consisting of 428-824-334 & 412 derailed between Victor Harbour and Port Elliott, later in June 428 was involved in a level crossing accident at Middleton, with visible damage to the front of the railcar. 424 re-entered service later that year.

=== Yorke Peninsula Railway ===
Yorke Peninsula Railway (YPR) took delivery of railcar 435 from Islington Railway Workshops to its depot in Wallaroo in February 2000, following its purchase from Great Northern Rail. In April 2002, railcar 406 was moved from the Milang Railway Museum to the YPR. Rolling stock leasing company CFCLA swapped the society's sole locomotive, T387 with the Superchook set (2301, trailer 2501, 2302) and railcars 416, 432 and 436. All railcars but 436 were transferred to Wallaroo, with 436 being stripped of parts and scrapped after an arson attack. 432, 435 and 406 remained stored as a source of parts while the Superchooks and 416 were put into service. They operated until the railway closed in 2009. 432 was moved to the Hunter Valley, NSW, while 435 was given to SteamRanger, which stripped remaining parts on it and placed it at Strathalbyn station for use by the art gallery at the station. 406 was moved to the Big Orange tourist attraction in Monash, near Berri for use as a restaurant, but this proposal never came to fruition and the railcar was purchased by the Bute Community Men's Shed, which had it moved to their site in Bute on 18 November 2024. It is intended to be restored as a museum and interpretive centre, then relocated to the former Bute railway station yard near the silo art, where the YPR once operated tourist trains. 416 and the Superchooks were moved to private property in Coolac, NSW and remained there until they were moved near Kandos, NSW in February 2021.

== Preservation list ==
This list contains all 300, 400, 820 and 860 class vehicles that were retained after original revenue service, including those which have since been scrapped.

| Key: | Operational | Stored | Not operating | Scrapped | Unknown |

=== 300 class single-ended power cars ===
| Number | Entered service | Current or last owner | Location | Status |
|---|---|---|---|---|
| 300 (later 2301) | 6 Oct 1955, rebuilt 18 Jul 1983 | Private owner | Kandos, NSW | Not operating |
| 303 | 6 Nov 1955 | Private owner | Blackwood, SA | Not operating |
| 311 | 17 Apr 1956 | Private owner - Gawler, SA | Lyndoch, SA | Stored/Operating |
| 317 | 17 Aug 1956 | Private owner | Riverton, SA | Not operating |
| 321 | 12 Apr 1957 | National Railway Museum | Port Adelaide,SA | Operational, used on special events days |
| 328 | 29 Jun 1956 | Private owner | Tanunda, SA | Unknown |
| 329 | 29 Jun 1957 | Private owner | Blewitt Springs, SA | Not operating |
| 333 | 7 Aug 1958 | Private owner | Two Wells, SA | Not operating |
| 334 | 4 Jun 1958 | SteamRanger Heritage Railway | Mount Barker, SA | Operational |
| 337 (later 2302) | 20 Jun 1958, rebuilt 18 Jul 1983 | Private owner | Kandos, NSW | Not operating |
| 338 | 3 Jul 1958 | Private owner | Blackwood, SA | Not operating |
| 339 | 3 Jul 1958 | Private owner | Riverton, SA | Not operating |
| 354 | 27 Apr 1961 | Private owner | Blewitt Springs, SA | Not operating |
| 364 | 8 Jul 1968 | SteamRanger Heritage Railway | Mount Barker, SA | Under restoration |
| 365 | 17 Jul 1968 | Private owner | Riverton, SA | Scrapped |
| 366 | 20 Jul 1968 | Private owner | Bendigo, Vic | Not operating |
| 367 | 23 Aug 1968 | Private owner | Riverton, SA | Not operating |
| 368 | 23 Aug 1968 | Private owner | Riverton, SA | Scrapped |
| 372 | 29 Jun 1970 | Private owner | Riverton, SA | Not operating |
| 373 | 2 Jul 1970 | Unknown | NSW | Unknown |

=== 400 class double-ended power cars ===
| Number | Entered service | Current or last owner | Location | Status |
|---|---|---|---|---|
| 400 | 17 Sep 1959 | National Railway Museum | Port Adelaide, SA | Operational, used on special events days |
| 402 | 2 Oct 1959 | Private owner - Gawler, SA | Lyndoch, SA | Stored/Operating |
| 405 | 12 Nov 1959 | SteamRanger Heritage Railway | Mount Barker, SA | Stored pending restoration to operational service |
| 406 | 14 Nov 1959 | Bute Community Men's Shed | Bute, SA | Not operating |
| 409 | 11 Dec 1959 | Private owner | Riverton, SA | Scrapped |
| 412 | 5 Dec 1960 | SteamRanger Heritage Railway | Goolwa, SA | Operational |
| 416 | 3 Feb 1961 | Private owner | Kandos, NSW | Not operating |
| 424 | 16 Sep 1968 | SteamRanger Heritage Railway | Mount Barker, SA | Operational |
| 428 | 6 Dec 1968 | SteamRanger Heritage Railway | Mount Barker, SA | Normally operational; under repair after level crossing accident June 2023 |
| 432 | 13 Feb 1970 | Private owner | Hunter Valley, NSW | Not operating |
| 433 | 20 May 1970 | Private owner | Riverton, SA | Scrapped |
| 435 | 30 Jun 1971 | Stationmaster's Art Gallery | Strathalbyn, SA | Not operating |
| 436 | 22 Jul 1971 | Yorke Peninsula Railway | Bendigo, Vic | Scrapped |

=== 820 class wooden-bodied trailer baggage cars ===
| Number | Original number | Entered service | Conversion | Current or last owner | Location | Status |
|---|---|---|---|---|---|---|
| 820 | 429 | 1 Dec 1917 | 23 Feb 1961 | SteamRanger Heritage Railway | Strathalbyn, SA | Scrapped |
| 824 | 329 | 17 Dec 1912 | 6 Jun 1961 | SteamRanger Heritage Railway | Goolwa, SA | Operational |
| 830 | 467 | 30 Jun 1924 | 29 Sep 1968 | SteamRanger Heritage Railway | Mount Barker, SA | Stored |
| 831 | 458 | 20 Apr 1918 | 24 Dec 1969 | Port Milang Historic Railway Museum | Milang, SA | Not operating |
| 832 | 468 | 24 Jul 1924 | 24 Dec 1969 | The Almond Train | McLaren Vale, SA | Not operating |

=== 860 class steel-bodied trailer cars ===
| Number | Original Number | Entered service | Conversion | Current or last owner | Location | Status |
|---|---|---|---|---|---|---|
| 862 (later 2501) | 850 | 4 Nov 1944 | 12 Dec 1955, rebuilt 18 Jul 1983 | Private owner | Kandos, NSW | Not operating |
| 863 | 853 | 13 Feb 1946 | 13 Feb 1956 | Unknown | Tanunda, SA | Unknown |
| 864 | 851 | 22 Mar 1945 | 17 Mar 1956 | Private owner | Strathalbyn, SA | Not operating |
| 870 | 810 | 24 Jul 1945 | 12 Apr 1957 | SA Support Services | Murray Bridge, SA | Not operating |
| 873 | 816 | 13 Feb 1946 | 29 May 1957 | Australian Train Movers | NSW | Unknown |
| 874 | 807 | 24 Jul 1945 | 17 Aug 1957 | Limestone Coast Railway | Mount Gambier, SA | Scrapped |
| 875 | 812 | 24 Jul 1945 | 3 Apr 1957 | SteamRanger Heritage Railway | Mount Barker, SA | Operational |
| 877 | 805 | 22 Mar 1945 | 4 Jun 1957 | Private owner | Hallett, SA | Not operating |
| 880 | 818 | 13 Feb 1946 | 25 Jul 1957 | Old Tailem Town Pioneer Village | Tailem Bend, SA | Not operating |
| 881 | 803 | 4 Nov 1944 | 19 Aug 1959 | Private owner | Tanunda, SA | Not operating |

=== Models ===
The SAR Model Company has made powered and unpowered HO scale kits of the 300 and 400 class power cars and 800, 850 and 860 class trailer cars. Ready-to-run Red Hens are stocked by Junction Models.
