= Mount Gambier railway line =

Former railway line in South Australia

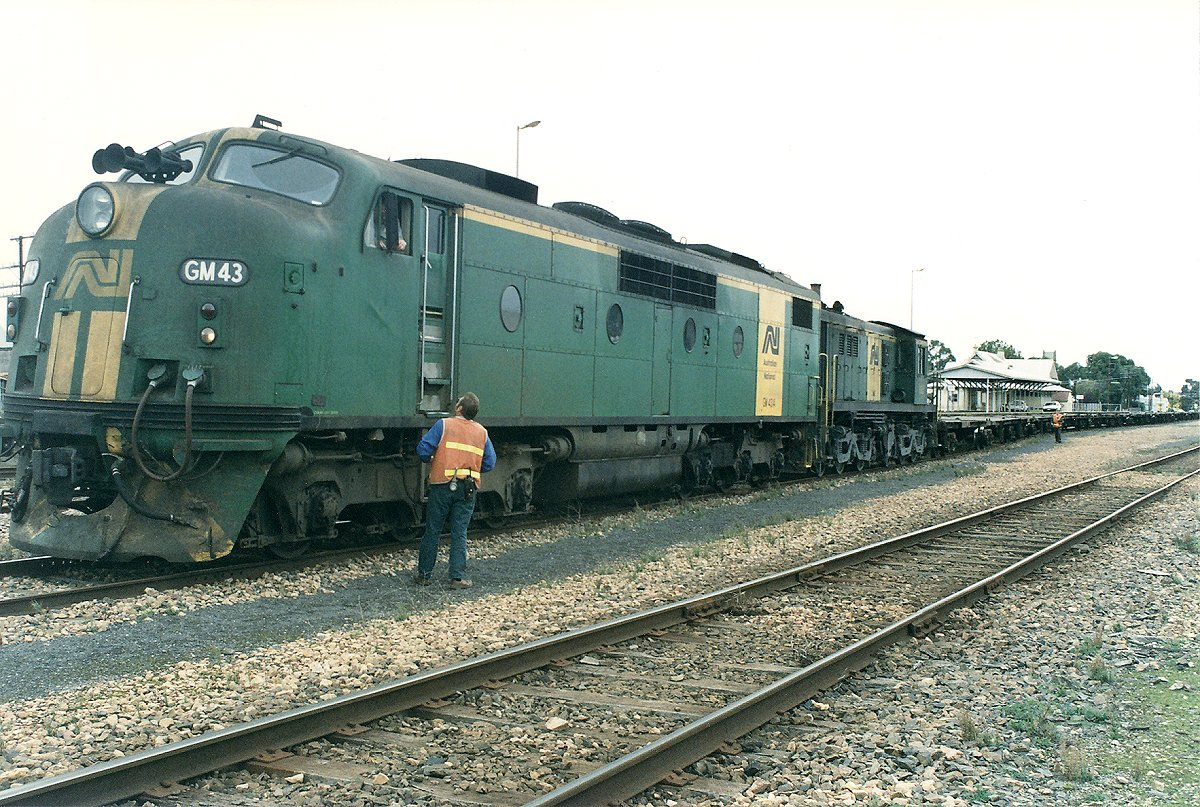
- GM43 and 852 ready to haul the last freight train out of Mount Gambier's old yard to Keswick on 12th April 1995.

Overview
- Status: Closed, Dormant
- Termini: Wolseley; Mount Gambier
- Continues from: Adelaide–Wolseley line
- Continues as: Mount Gambier–Heywood line

Service
- System: South Australian Railways
- Operator(s): South Australian Railways; Australian National

History
- Opened: Naracoorte-Custon: 21 September 1881; Custon-Bordertown: 31 March 1883; Naracoorte–Mount Gambier: 14 June 1887
- Closed: 31 December 1990 (passenger); 12 April 1995 (freight); 1 July 2006 (tourist)

Technical
- Line length: 183.2 km (113.8 mi)
- Track gauge: 1,600 mm (5 ft 3 in)
- Old gauge: 1,067 mm (3 ft 6 in)

The Mount Gambier railway line is a closed railway line in South Australia. Opened in stages from 1881, it was built to narrow gauge and joined Mount Gambier railway station, which was at that time the eastern terminus of a line to Beachport. It connected at Naracoorte to another isolated narrow gauge line joining Naracoorte to Kingston SE, and to the broad gauge Adelaide-Wolseley line at Wolseley, at around the same time that was extended to Serviceton to become the South Australian part of the interstate Melbourne–Adelaide railway. It was closed in April 1995.

== History ==
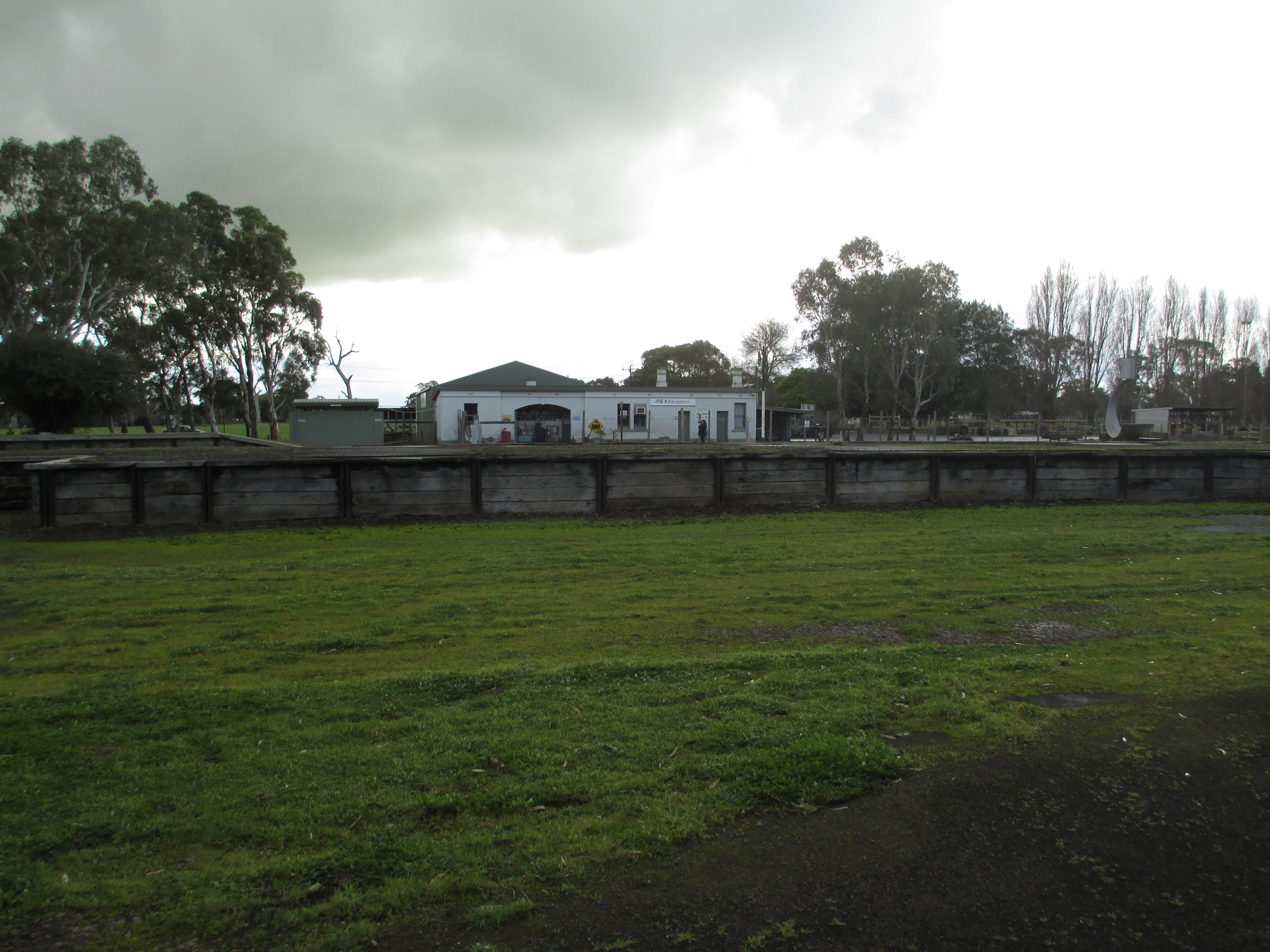
Former Kalangadoo railway station building

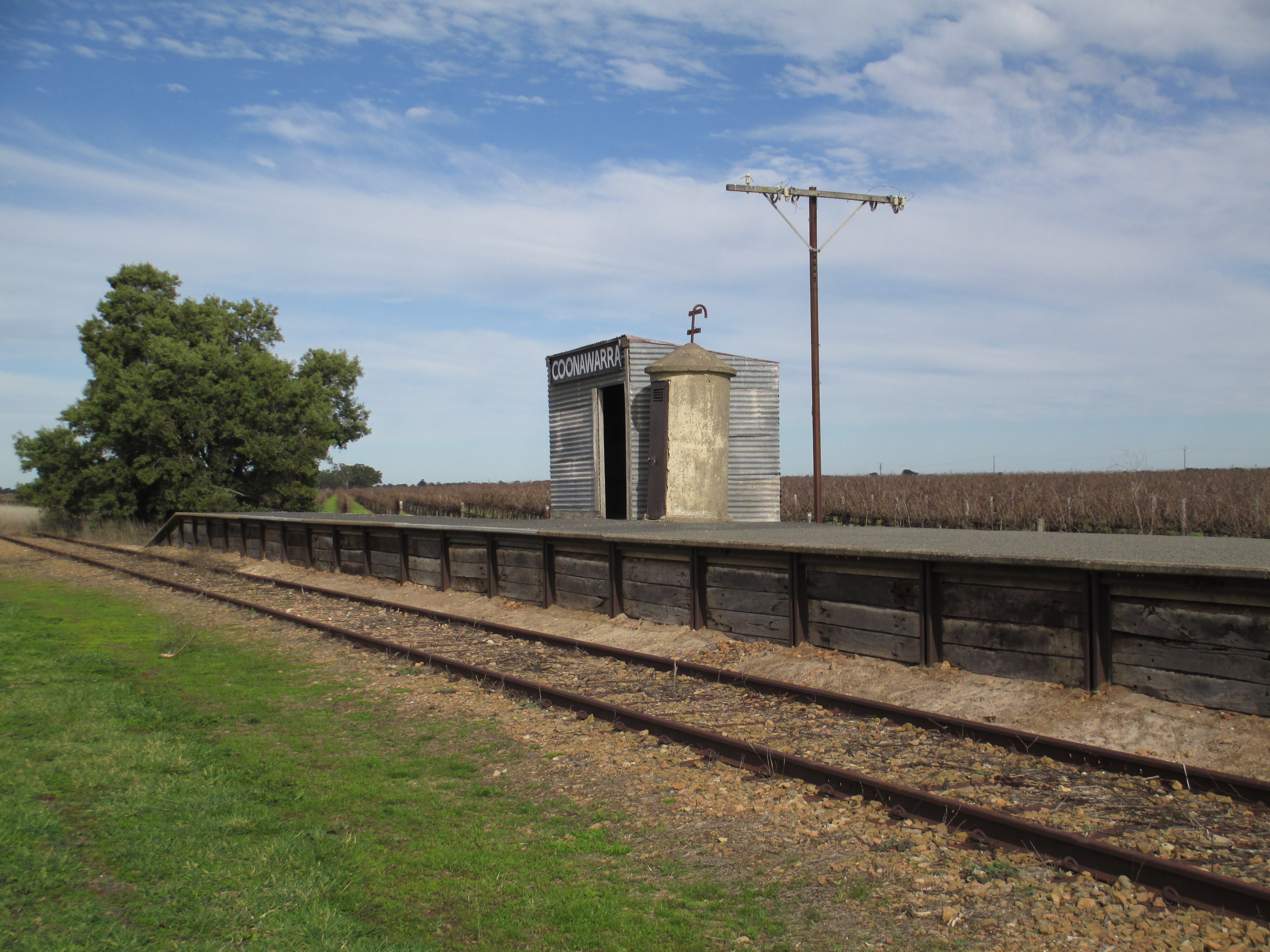
Coonawarra railway station

The railway connecting Mount Gambier to Naracoorte was initially approved by the Parliament of South Australia in 1867 to be built to 5 ft 3 in (1,600 mm) gauge. However it was not built at this time, and that act was repealed by a later authorisation in 1884 to build it on the same alignment to 3 ft 6 in (1,067 mm) gauge.

The first section was opened on 21 September 1881 from Naracoorte to University Block, later known as Custon. It was extended north to Bordertown on 18 April 1883 and south from Naracoorte to Mount Gambier on 14 June 1887.

From 19 January 1887, the Wolseley to Bordertown section became dual gauge, and was shared with the broad gauge Adelaide-Wolseley railway line. The terminus of the narrow gauge line was truncated to Wolseley in 1924.

The Mount Gambier line was gauge converted to broad gauge in 1953 being a dual gauge line then with the narrow gauge being completely removed by 1959 .

Australian National passenger services ceased on 31 December 1990.

When the Melbourne–Adelaide railway was converted to standard gauge, the Mount Gambier to Wolseley line was not converted and was closed on 12 April 1995.

In 2001, expressions of interest were sought for a private operator to reopen the line with the state government offering financial assistance to gauge convert, but nothing came of it. If done so it would be the first in Australia to have all 3 gauges.

Part of the line was used by the Limestone Coast Railway tourist service, until it ceased 1 July 2006. On 13 February 2019 the South Australian Regional Rail Alliance (SARRA) called on the State Government to standardise the line for freight and possible passenger services but still nothing has come of this either.

=== Glencoe branch ===
On 22 August 1904, a 14.2-kilometre narrow gauge branch-line was constructed from Wandilo, 13 kilometres north of Mount Gambier, to Glencoe. The branch closed in June 1957 when the Mount Gambier Wolseley line was all converted to only broad gauge.

=== Victorian connection ===
On 28 November 1917, the Victorian Railways opened a broad gauge line from Heywood. This line was closed on 11 April 1995. Part of this line was used for Limestone Coast Railway tourist services to the border until it ceased 20 March 1999. The Heywood line was permanently severed from the Wolseley line when the remains of Mount Gambier railway station was made into a public community space in 2015 with a two track easement left for right of way if standardised.

== Stations ==
The stations and sidings included:

- Wolseley
- Custon
- Bangham
- Frances
- Binnum
- Kybybolite
- Hynam
- Naracoorte
- Struan
- Glenroy
- Coonawarra
- Penola
- Krongart
- Kalangadoo
- Wandilo
- Mount Gambier

== Trail ==
Mount Gambier Rail Trail
- Length: 16.4 km (10.2 mi)
- Location: Limestone Coast, South Australia
- Use: Hiking, cycling
- Season: all
- Hazards: some at-level road crossings
- Surface: sealed
- Right of way: Mount Gambier railway line
- Website: www.railtrails.org.au/trails/mount-gambier-rail-trail/

The Mount Gambier Rail Trail is a rail trail that follows the course of the railway line. It is open to pedestrians and cyclists, and runs for 10.5 km from Mount Gambier and ends in the suburb of Suttontown.

The trail was completed in early 2017 from Pick Avenue to Whites Avenue. It was extended to west from White Avenue to Jubilee Highway West in late 2017. It was extended further to Pick Avenue to link up with the existing Jubilee Highway path leading to Umpherston Sinkhole and Blue Lake Sports Park. It was also extended north from Jubilee Hwy West to Wandilo RD. An additional 3 km was built west from White Ave to Cafpirco Rd along the disused railway line to Millicent.
