= Culburra railway station =

Former railway station in South Australia, Australia

Culburra
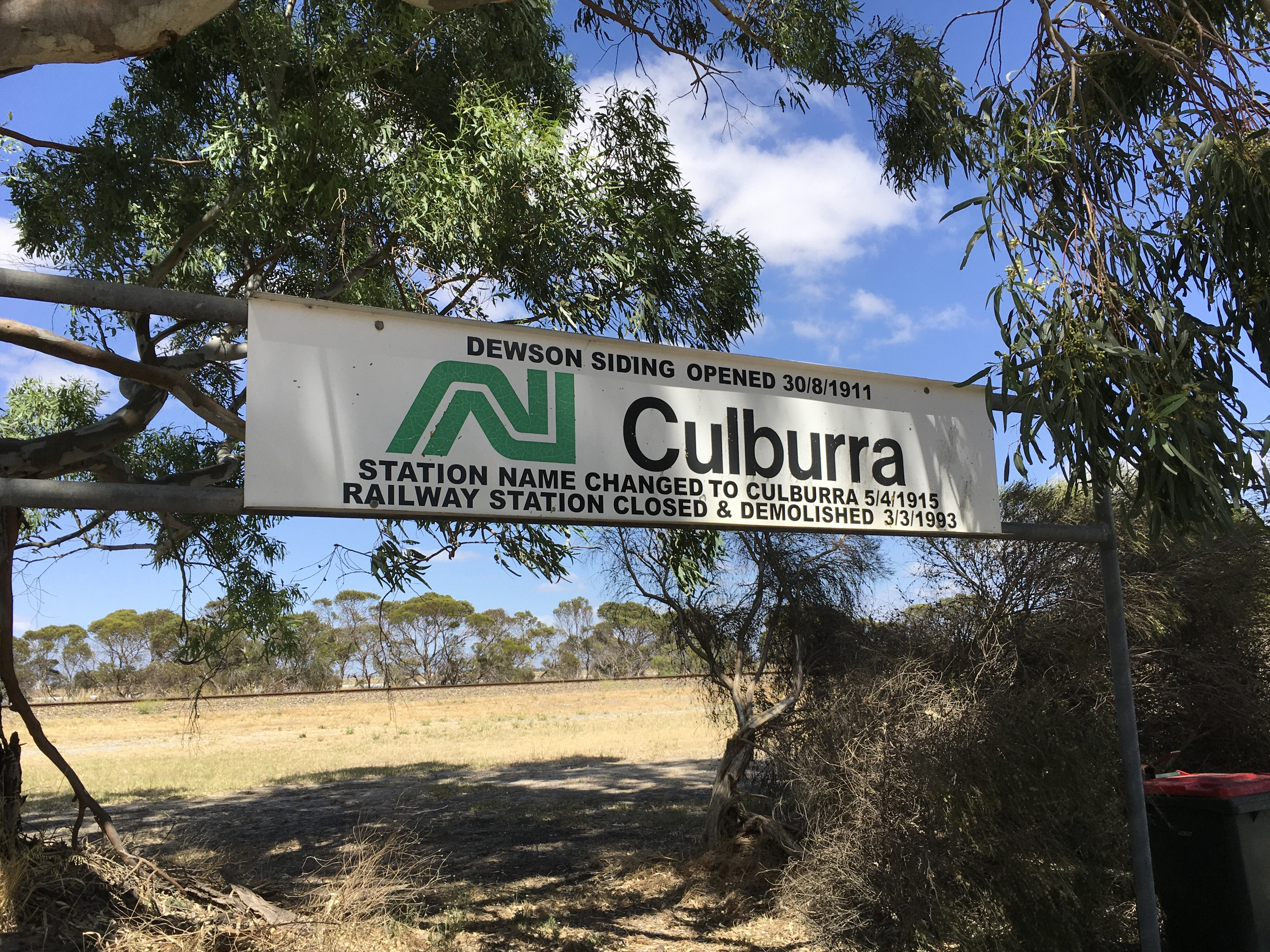
- The station sign in December 2019, displayed at the highway rest stop in Culburra.

General information
- Location: Dukes Highway, Culburra, South Australia
- Coordinates: 35°48′54″S 139°57′56″E
- System: Former Australian National regional rail
- Operator: South Australian Railways 1911 - 1978 Australian National 1978 - 1990
- Line: Adelaide-Wolseley
- Distance: 200 kilometres from Adelaide
- Platforms: 1

Construction
- Structure type: Ground

Other information
- Status: Closed and demolished

History
- Opened: 30 August 1911
- Closed: 31 December 1990
- Former names: Dewson

Services
Preceding station	Australian Rail Track Corporation	Following station
Coonalpyn towards Adelaide	Adelaide–Wolseley railway line	Tintinara towards Serviceton
Location

Culburra railway station was located on the Adelaide-Wolseley line in Culburra, South Australia.

== History ==
Culburra station was located between Coonalpyn and Tintinara on the Adelaide-Wolseley line, and it was on the Nairne to Bordertown section of the line which opened in 1886. The line opened in stages: on 14 March 1883 from Adelaide to Aldgate, on 28 November 1883 to Nairne, on 1 May 1886 to Bordertown and on 19 January 1887 to Serviceton. However, a station at Culburra was not established until 30 August 1911, when it opened at the 124 mile (later 200 km) mark on the line as Dewson siding. People within the area asked that the station be renamed to Culburra, and the renaming took place on 5 April 1915. When the CTC safeworking system was installed on this section of the line, the station was rebuilt with a small brick building similar to those that still exist at Coomandook, Coombe, and Wirrega. Ownership of the station was transferred to Australian National in 1978. It closed on December 31, 1990, when AN ceased all intrastate passenger services in South Australia, and was demolished on 3 March 1993. The station sign was relocated next to the Dukes Highway rest stop in Culburra.
