= Wirrega railway station =

Former railway station in South Australia

Wirrega

General information
- Coordinates: 36.2058°S 140.5845°E
- Elevation: 66 m (217 ft)
- Owner: South Australian Railways 1886 - 1978 Australian National 1978 - 1998 Australian Rail Track Corporation 1998 - present
- Operator: South Australian Railways 1886 - 1978 Australian National 1978 - 1990
- Line: Adelaide-Wolseley
- Distance: 273 kilometres from Adelaide

Construction
- Structure type: Ground

Other information
- Status: Closed

History
- Opened: 1 May 1886
- Closed: 31 December 1990

Services
Preceding station	Australian Rail Track Corporation	Following station
Brimbago towards Adelaide	Adelaide–Wolseley railway line	Cannawigara towards Serviceton
Location

Wirrega railway station was located on the Adelaide-Wolseley railway line in the town of Wirrega, 273 kilometres from Adelaide railway station by rail.

== History ==
=== Opening and upgrades ===
Wirrega railway station was located between Brimbago and Bordertown on the Adelaide-Wolseley line, and it opened as part of the Nairne to Bordertown extension of the line on 1 May 1886. It was named after John Bennie's homestead, founded by him in 1850, and is the native name for an off-shoot from the Tatiara tribe meaning "dwellers in the open forest". Although a siding was provided at Wirrega, it lacked passenger facilities, and so the local residents asked for a passenger platform to be built in 1887. Finally in 1912, the platform was built along with a wooden station building containing offices and a waiting room. When construction was complete, railway staff, including a stationmaster and an assistant were appointed to Wirrega in November 1912. Wirrega was named as a potential terminus for a light railway to Kingston SE or Lucindale, but nothing came of the proposal. In 1927, electric signalling was added at Wirrega. Further signalling work in 1932 enabled reduction of staff at the station. On 19 January 1938, a large scrub fire was alerted to by the signalman at Wirrega, and damage was caused to telephone infrastructure and sleepers, delaying some trains. Hasty repairs were conducted along the line to minimise the wait for express trains. Later works during the 1950s-1960s included the construction of concrete grain silos so that wheat being loaded onto trains at Wirrega would no longer need to be bagged, and a new small brick building at the station similar to those that still exist at Coomandook, Coombe, and Culburra.

=== Closure and present day ===
In 1978, the station and all associated infrastructure was included in the transfer of South Australian Railways to Australian National. The last service to use the station was the Bluebird railcar passenger service to Mount Gambier, known as the Blue Lake. When AN ceased all intrastate passenger services in South Australia including the Blue Lake, the station closed to passengers on December 31, 1990. The line is still used by freight and The Overland passenger train, but the remaining passenger facilities and goods platform have fallen into disuse. The formerly rail-served grain silos were marked as road only and were closed for the first time by Viterra during the 2013/2014 season, and no longer form a part of their grain loading network. During August-September 2024, the silos became the first along the Adelaide-Wolseley line to be completely demolished. The station yard retains 3 tracks, including the abandoned goods siding, a 1550m passing loop, and the mainline.
