= Cooke Plains railway station =

Railway station in Cooke Plains, South Australia

Cooke Plains

General information
- Coordinates: 35.3778°S 139.5590°E
- System: Former Australian National regional rail
- Operator: South Australian Railways 1886 - 1978 Australian National 1978-1990
- Line: Adelaide-Wolseley
- Distance: 137 kilometres from Adelaide
- Platforms: 1

Construction
- Structure type: Ground

Other information
- Status: Closed and demolished

History
- Opened: 1 May 1886
- Closed: 31 December 1990

Services
Preceding station	Australian Rail Track Corporation	Following station
Tailem Bend towards Adelaide	Adelaide–Wolseley railway line	Coomandook towards Serviceton
Location

Cooke Plains railway station was located in the town of Cooke Plains, about 137 kilometres from Adelaide station.

== History ==
Cooke Plains station was located between Tailem Bend and Coomandook on the Adelaide-Wolseley line, and opened in 1886 as part of the extension from Nairne to Bordertown. The line opened in stages: on 14 March 1883 from Adelaide to Aldgate, on 28 November 1883 to Nairne, on 1 May 1886 to Bordertown and on 19 January 1887 to Serviceton. The original station was replaced with a smaller brick building and platform in later years. This station design was also used at other stations on the Tailem Bend-Wolseley section of the line. The station closed on 31 December 1990 upon cessation of all AN intrastate services in South Australia. It has since been demolished.
