= Tintinara railway station =

Former railway station in South Australia, Australia

Tintinara
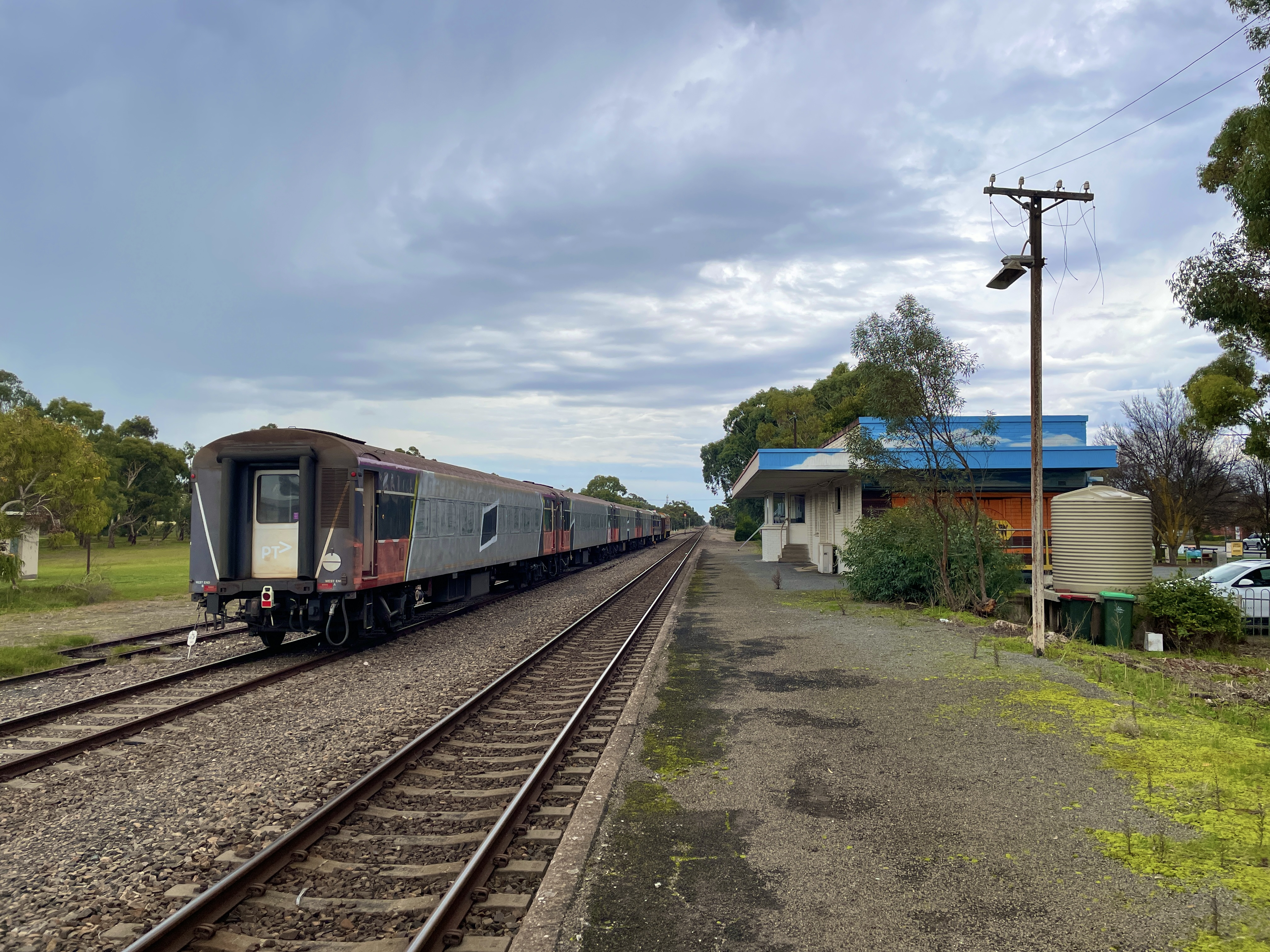
- A train stopped opposite the Tintinara railway station building, June 2023

General information
- Location: Dukes Highway, Tintinara, South Australia
- Coordinates: 35°53′08″S 140°03′26″E
- Elevation: 16 m (52 ft)
- System: Former Great Southern Rail regional rail
- Operator: South Australian Railways 1886 - 1978 Australian National 1978 - 1997 Great Southern Rail 1997-1999
- Line: Adelaide-Wolseley
- Distance: 211 kilometres from Adelaide
- Platforms: 1
- Tracks: 3

Construction
- Structure type: Ground
- Parking: yes

Other information
- Status: Closed, now used as a tourist info centre

History
- Opened: 1 May 1886
- Closed: May 1999

Services
Preceding station	Australian Rail Track Corporation	Following station
Culburra towards Adelaide	Adelaide–Wolseley railway line	Coombe towards Serviceton
Location

Tintinara railway station is located on the Adelaide-Wolseley line in Tintinara, South Australia.

== History ==
Tintinara station opened on 1 May 1886 as a station on the Nairne-Bordertown extension of what became the Adelaide-Wolseley line. The line opened in stages: on 14 March 1883 from Adelaide to Aldgate, on 28 November 1883 to Nairne, on 1 May 1886 to Bordertown and on 19 January 1887 to Serviceton. The station was rebuilt with a brick station building when CTC was installed on this section of the Adelaide-Wolseley railway line. Facilities at the station included a passenger platform and station building, and a goods platform, crane and shed. The station yard consisted of 3 tracks including a mainline, a passing loop, and a goods siding. In May 1999, the station was closed when The Overland, then operated by Great Southern Rail began operating on a new timetable that skipped multiple stations including Tintinara. The station building is now used as a tourist info centre, and a mural on the front was unveiled in 2018. The Viterra owned grain silos in Tintinara are no longer served by rail and have since been closed. Meanwhile, the nearby goods shed has been repurposed as the Tintinara Community Men's Shed, albeit without the canopy over the track. The goods siding is disused, but the station yard retains 3 tracks to this day.
