= Ki Ki railway station =

Former railway station in South Australia

Ki Ki
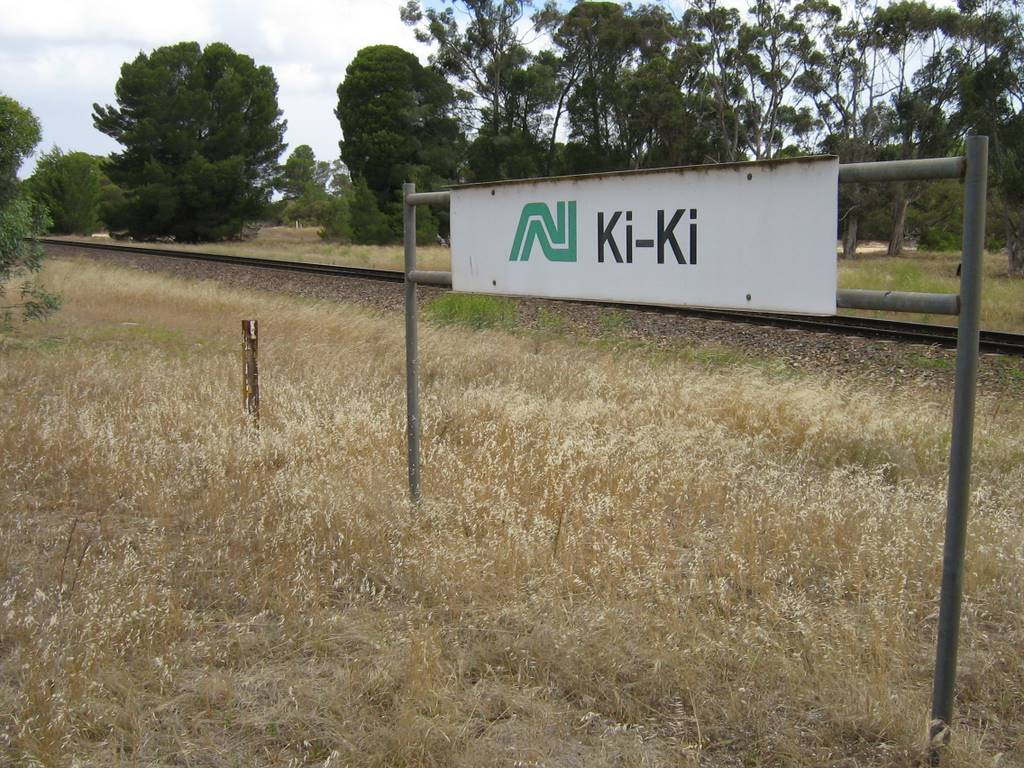
- The former railway station sign at Ki Ki, 2007

General information
- Coordinates: 35.5682°S 139.7930°E
- System: Former Australian National regional rail
- Operator: South Australian Railways 1914 - 1978 Australian National 1978-1990
- Line: Adelaide-Wolseley
- Distance: 168 kilometres from Adelaide
- Platforms: 1

Construction
- Structure type: Ground

Other information
- Status: Closed and demolished

History
- Opened: 30 August 1911
- Closed: 31 December 1990

Services
Preceding station	Australian Rail Track Corporation	Following station
Yumali towards Adelaide	Adelaide–Wolseley railway line	Coonalpyn towards Serviceton
Location

Ki Ki railway station was located in the town of Ki Ki, about 168 kilometres from Adelaide station.

== History ==
Ki Ki station was located between Yumali and Coonalpyn on the Adelaide-Wolseley line, and it was on the Nairne to Bordertown section of the line which opened in 1886. The line opened in stages: on 14 March 1883 from Adelaide to Aldgate, on 28 November 1883 to Nairne, on 1 May 1886 to Bordertown and on 19 January 1887 to Serviceton. The station at Ki Ki was not included as part of the 1886 extension, but instead was built years later and it was opened on 30 August 1911. The original station was replaced with a smaller brick building and platform in later years. This station design was also used at other stations on the Tailem Bend-Wolseley section of the line.The station closed on 31 December 1990 upon cessation of all AN intrastate services in South Australia. It has since been demolished, but the station sign remains at the site.
