= Monteith railway station =

Railway station in Monteith, Australia

Monteith

General information
- Coordinates: 35.18°S 139.38°E
- System: Former Australian National regional rail
- Operator: South Australian Railways
- Line: Adelaide-Wolseley
- Distance: 110 kilometres from Adelaide
- Platforms: 1

Construction
- Structure type: Ground

Other information
- Status: Closed and demolished

History
- Opened: 1 May 1911

Services
Preceding station	Australian Rail Track Corporation	Following station
Murray Bridge towards Adelaide	Adelaide–Wolseley railway line	Tailem Bend towards Serviceton
Location

Monteith railway station was located in the locality of Monteith, about 110 kilometres from Adelaide station.

== History ==
Monteith station was located between Murray Bridge and Tailem Bend on the Adelaide to Wolseley line. The line opened in stages: on 14 March 1883 from Adelaide to Aldgate, on 28 November 1883 to Nairne, on 1 May 1886 to Bordertown and on 19 January 1887 to Serviceton. After the town was established in 1909, a meeting was held by the residents where it was unanimously decided that a railway station was needed to serve the town. While the townspeople wanted the station at the 66 mile (106 km) mark, SAR opted to build the station at the 68 mile (110 km) mark. The station was opened for passengers on 1 May 1911, and for goods on 2 September 1911. It was still listed as a stopping place in the July 1975 ANR public timetable. The CTC safeworking system was extended from Monarto South to Monteith on 1 November 1983. The station would've been closed before or as a result of AN's cessation of all intrastate passenger services in SA on 31 December 1990. on 2 September 1992, the crossing loop at the station site was closed. A new 1800m crossing loop was opened within the Monteith locality by the line's current owner, ARTC in 2011.
