= Brimbago railway station =

Former railway station in South Australia

Brimbago

General information
- Coordinates: 36.1633°S 140.4623°E
- Elevation: 46 m (151 ft)
- System: Former Australian National regional rail
- Owner: South Australian Railways 1886 - 1978 Australian National 1978 - 1998 Australian Rail Track Corporation 1998 - present
- Operator: South Australian Railways 1886 - 1978 Australian National 1978 - 1981
- Line: Adelaide-Wolseley
- Distance: 261 kilometres from Adelaide
- Platforms: 1
- Tracks: 1

Construction
- Structure type: Ground

Other information
- Status: Closed and demolished

History
- Opened: 10 February 1913
- Closed: 1 November 1980 (freight); 5 February 1981 (passengers)

Services
Preceding station	Australian Rail Track Corporation	Following station
Keith towards Adelaide	Adelaide–Wolseley railway line	Wirrega towards Serviceton
Location

Brimbago railway station was located on the Adelaide-Wolseley railway line in the locality of Brimbago, 261 kilometres from Adelaide railway station by rail.

== History ==
=== Opening and upgrades ===
Brimbago railway station was located between Keith and Wirrega on the Adelaide-Wolseley line, and it was on the Nairne to Bordertown section of the line which opened in 1886. The line opened in stages: on 14 March 1883 from Adelaide to Aldgate, on 28 November 1883 to Nairne, on 1 May 1886 to Bordertown and on 19 January 1887 to Serviceton. However, the locality did not receive a siding until 10 February 1913. The facilities included a passenger platform, and a goods siding with a platform and shed. The railway station was named after the livestock station of the same name, and it is a local Aboriginal name meaning "big swamp." It was suggested to change the name of the siding in 1917, but this never happened. On 19 January 1938, a large scrub fire caused damage to telephone infrastructure and sleepers, delaying some trains and almost trapping a ministerial party inspecting road works near Brimbago. Hasty repairs were conducted along the line to minimise the wait for express trains. On 15 January 1941, a railway electrian was killed after his railway quadricycle hit a large unregistered dog at Brimbago and was turned over from the collision. As a result of the incident, the Tatiara District Council decided to prosecute landowners with unregistered dogs the following month. The station received facilities for loading livestock in 1960.

=== Closure and present day ===
In 1978, the station and all associated infrastructure was included in the transfer of South Australian Railways to Australian National. From 1 February 1980, Brimbago no longer accepted less-than-car loads, but was still open to take wagon loads until 1 November 1980, when the siding closed to freight. Brimbago was fully closed to passengers on 5 February 1981, and all station infrastructure was demolished later that year, leaving the mainline track and signals.
