= Coombe railway station, South Australia =

Former railway station in Coombe, Australia

Coombe

General information
- Location: Dukes Highway, Coombe, South Australia
- Coordinates: 35°57′30″S 140°13′00″E
- Elevation: 26 m (85 ft)
- System: Australian National regional rail
- Owner: South Australian Railways 1913 - 1978 Australian National 1978 - 1998 Australian Rail Track Corporation 1998 - present
- Operator: South Australian Railways 1913 - 1978 Australian National 1978 - 1990
- Line: Adelaide-Wolseley
- Distance: 228 kilometres from Adelaide
- Platforms: 1
- Tracks: 3

Construction
- Structure type: Ground

Other information
- Status: Closed

History
- Opened: 23 January 1913
- Closed: 31 December 1990

Services
Preceding station	Australian Rail Track Corporation	Following station
Tintinara towards Adelaide	Adelaide–Wolseley railway line	Keith towards Serviceton
Location

Coombe railway station was located on the Adelaide-Wolseley line in Coombe, South Australia.

== History ==
=== Opening ===
Coombe station was located between Tintinara and Keith on the Adelaide-Wolseley line, and it was on the Nairne to Bordertown section of the line which opened in 1886. The line opened in stages: on 14 March 1883 from Adelaide to Aldgate, on 28 November 1883 to Nairne, on 1 May 1886 to Bordertown and on 19 January 1887 to Serviceton. However, a station at the locality of Coombe was not established until 23 January 1913.

=== Station facilities and upgrades ===
The facilities included at the station when first built included a passenger platform, goods platform, and a goods shed. A crossing loop was also provided, allowing trains to crossing each other at this location. When the CTC safeworking system was installed on this section of the line, the station was rebuilt with a small brick building similar to those that still exist at Coomandook and Wirrega. Ownership of the station was transferred to Australian National in 1978.

=== Closure and present day ===
The last service to use the station was the Bluebird railcar service to Mount Gambier, known as the Blue Lake. Coombe was often used as a crossing location for down and up Blue Lake services to cross each other. When AN ceased all intrastate passenger services in South Australia including the Blue Lake, the station closed on December 31, 1990. The passenger building and platform are now disused, but the 1550m crossing loops remains in use.
