= Coonalpyn railway station =

Former railway station in South Australia, Australia

Coonalpyn
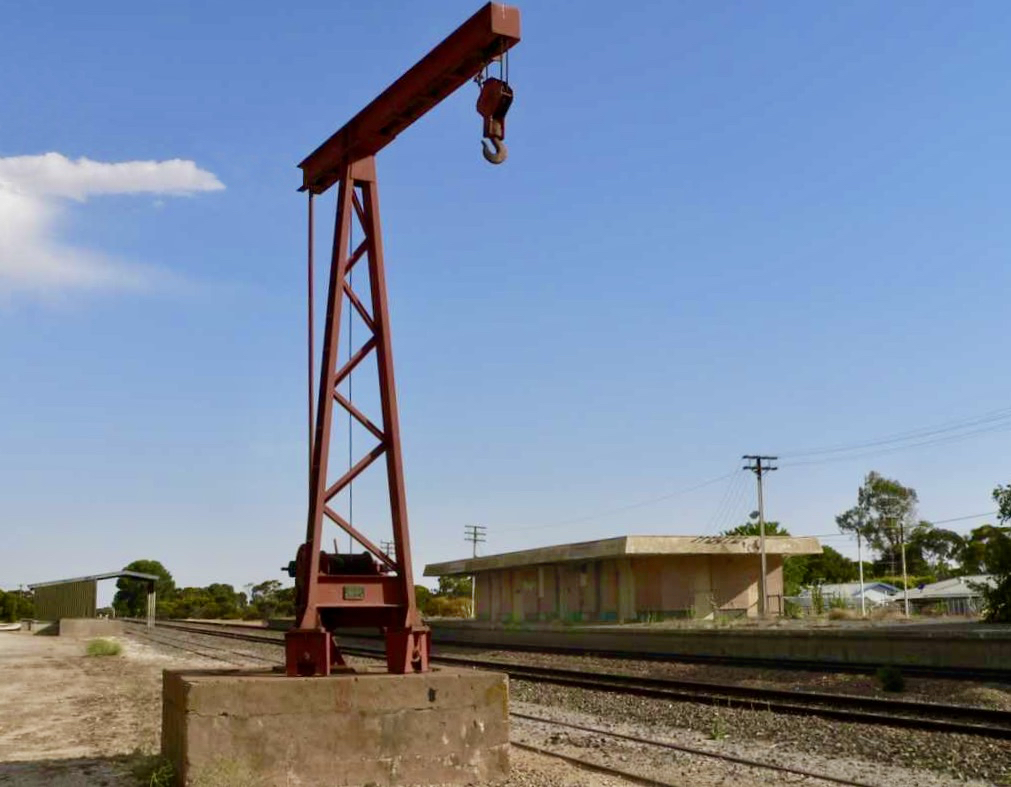
- The station in December 2006 before demolition of the station building.

General information
- Location: Dukes Highway, Coonalpyn, South Australia
- Coordinates: 35°41′49″S 139°51′26″E
- System: Former Great Southern Rail regional rail
- Operator: South Australian Railways 1886 - 1978 Australian National 1978 - 1997 Great Southern Rail 1997-1999
- Line: Adelaide-Wolseley
- Distance: 183 kilometres from Adelaide
- Platforms: 1

Construction
- Structure type: Ground

Other information
- Status: Closed and demolished

History
- Opened: 1 May 1886
- Closed: May 1999

Services
Preceding station	Australian Rail Track Corporation	Following station
Ki Ki towards Adelaide	Adelaide–Wolseley railway line	Culburra towards Serviceton
Location

Coonalpyn railway station is located on the Adelaide-Wolseley line in Coonalpyn, South Australia.

== History ==
Coonalpyn station opened on 1 May 1886 as a station on the Nairne-Bordertown extension of what became the Adelaide-Wolseley line. The line opened in stages: on 14 March 1883 from Adelaide to Aldgate, on 28 November 1883 to Nairne, on 1 May 1886 to Bordertown and on 19 January 1887 to Serviceton. A goods platform was requested by the residents of the town in 1903, and was later built. A 5-ton crane was installed on the goods platform in 1951. The station was rebuilt with a brick station building when CTC was installed on this section of the Adelaide-Wolseley railway line. In May 1999, the station closed when The Overland, then operated by Great Southern Rail began operating on a new timetable that skipped multiple stations including Coonalpyn. The station building was demolished in July 2007. The Viterra owned grain silos in Coonalpyn are no longer served by rail, but are still used by trucks. In March 2017, the silos were painted and became South Australia's first silo art.
