= Yumali railway station =

Former railway station in South Australia

Yumali

General information
- Coordinates: 35.5083°S 139.7565°E
- System: Former Australian National regional rail
- Operator: South Australian Railways 1914 - 1978 Australian National 1978-1990
- Line: Adelaide-Wolseley
- Distance: 160 kilometres from Adelaide
- Platforms: 1

Construction
- Structure type: Ground

Other information
- Status: Closed and demolished

History
- Opened: 4 February 1914
- Closed: 31 December 1990

Services
Preceding station	Australian Rail Track Corporation	Following station
Coomandook towards Adelaide	Adelaide–Wolseley railway line	Ki Ki towards Serviceton
Location

Yumali railway station was located in the town of Yumali, about 160 kilometres from Adelaide station.

== History ==
Yumali station was located between Coomandook and Ki Ki on the Adelaide-Wolseley line, and the line through Yumali was opened in 1886 as part of the extension from Nairne to Bordertown. The line opened in stages: on 14 March 1883 from Adelaide to Aldgate, on 28 November 1883 to Nairne, on 1 May 1886 to Bordertown and on 19 January 1887 to Serviceton. There was originally no station at what eventually became Yumali, but it was a stopping place known as the 100-Mile camp. When a station opened at this location on 4 February 1914, it was known as Wahpunyah siding. It was later changed to Yumali, and a town was established at this location. The station closed on 31 December 1990 upon cessation of all AN intrastate services in South Australia. It has since been demolished.
