= Keith railway station, South Australia =

Former railway station in Keith, Australia

Keith
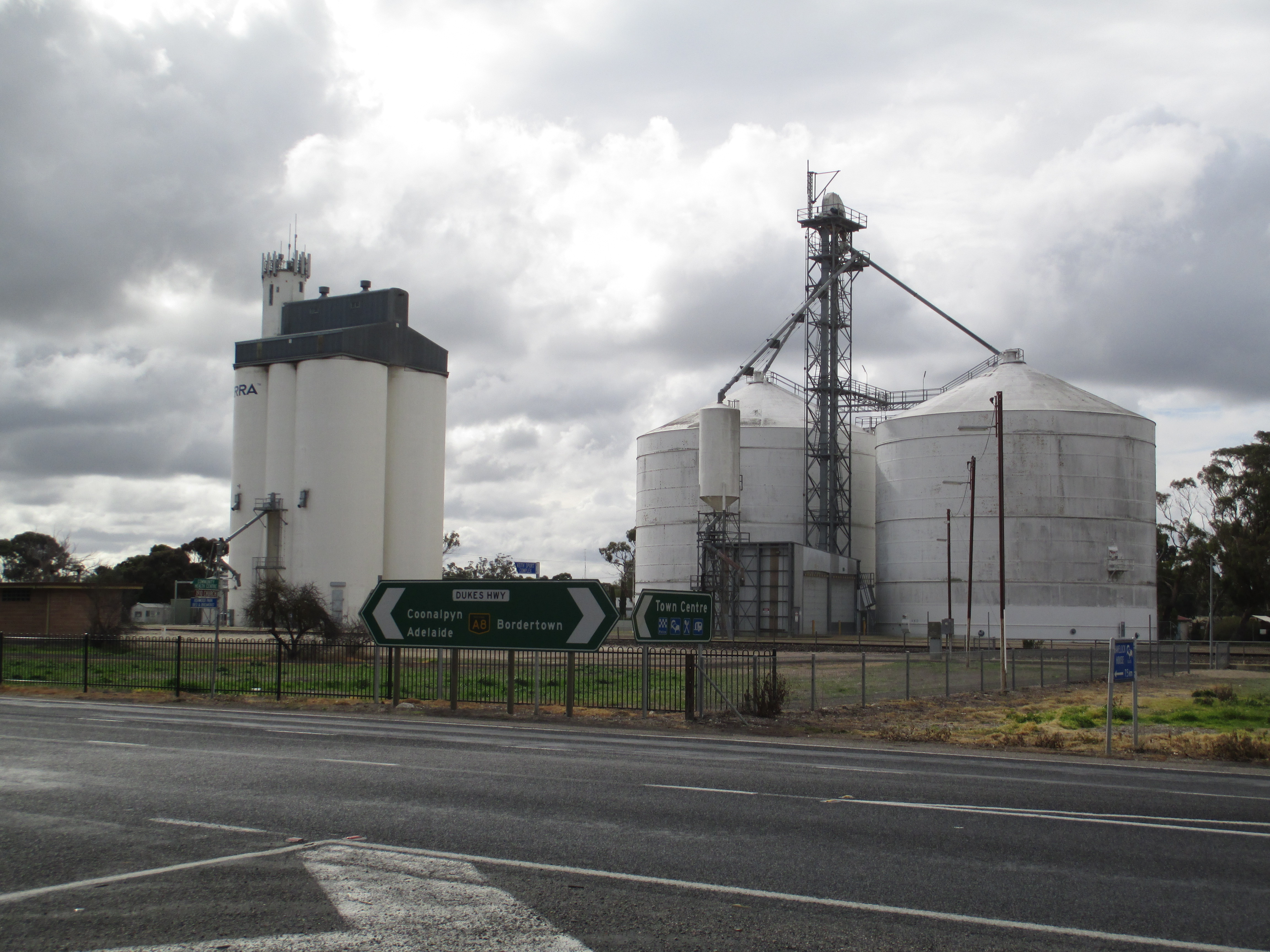
- Grain silos next to the station yard at Keith, 2015.

General information
- Location: Dukes Highway, Keith, South Australia
- Coordinates: 36°05′48″S 140°21′18″E
- Elevation: 28 m (92 ft)
- System: Former Australian National regional rail
- Owner: South Australian Railways 1886 - 1978 Australian National 1978 - 1998 Australian Rail Track Corporation 1998 - present
- Operator: South Australian Railways 1886 - 1978 Australian National 1978 - 1990
- Line: Adelaide-Wolseley
- Distance: 249 kilometres from Adelaide
- Platforms: 1
- Tracks: 4

Construction
- Structure type: Ground

Other information
- Status: Closed and demolished

History
- Opened: 1 May 1886
- Closed: 31 December 1990
- Former names: Mount Monster

Services
Preceding station	Australian Rail Track Corporation	Following station
Coombe towards Adelaide	Adelaide–Wolseley railway line	Brimbago towards Serviceton
Location

Keith railway station was located on the Adelaide-Wolseley line in Keith, South Australia.

== History ==
=== Opening ===
Keith station was located between Coombe and Brimbago on the Adelaide-Wolseley line, and it was on the Nairne to Bordertown section of the line which opened in 1886. The line opened in stages: on 14 March 1883 from Adelaide to Aldgate, on 28 November 1883 to Nairne, on 1 May 1886 to Bordertown and on 19 January 1887 to Serviceton. The area that the siding was established in was originally known as Mount Monster until the township of Keith was declared in 1889. During the early 20th century, it was proposed to make Keith a junction station for a new railway to Lucindale or to another point on the lines out of Mount Gambier, separate to the existing alignment via Wolseley, but nothing eventuated.

=== Station facilities and upgrades ===
The facilities included at the station included a passenger platform, a goods platform, and a goods shed. A crossing loop was also provided, allowing trains to cross each other at this location. A stationmaster and porter were provided in 1908. The station building was upgraded with a new brick building in the 1950s. Given the large output of grain from the area, concrete grain silos were built next to the station yard in 1962, allowing bulk handing of grain for goods trains without the need for bagging. Ownership of the station and the railway line was transferred to Australian National in 1978.

=== Closure and present day ===
The last service to use the station was the Bluebird railcar service to Mount Gambier, known as the Blue Lake. When AN ceased all intrastate passenger services in South Australia including the Blue Lake, the station closed on December 31, 1990. The passenger building and platform were demolished in 2007, but the goods shed remains in disuse. The grain silos are currently owned by Canadian grain handler Viterra, and are still served by rail, usually by Aurizon trains. In 2010, the passing loop was extended to 1871m, allowing 1800m long trains to cross at Keith.
