= Cannawigara railway station =

Former railway station in South Australia

Cannawigara

General information
- Coordinates: 36.2506°S 140.6698°E
- Elevation: 68 m (223 ft)
- System: Former Australian National regional rail
- Owner: South Australian Railways 1886 - 1978 Australian National 1978 - 1998 Australian Rail Track Corporation 1998 - present
- Operator: South Australian Railways 1886 - 1978 Australian National 1978 - 1990
- Line: Adelaide-Wolseley
- Distance: 282 kilometres from Adelaide
- Platforms: 1
- Tracks: 1

Construction
- Structure type: Ground

Other information
- Status: Closed and demolished

History
- Opened: 30 August 1911
- Closed: 31 December 1990 (passengers); 31 December 1992 (freight)

Services
Preceding station	Australian Rail Track Corporation	Following station
Wirrega towards Adelaide	Adelaide–Wolseley railway line	Bordertown towards Serviceton
Location

Cannawigara railway station was located on the Adelaide-Wolseley railway line in the locality of Cannawigara, 282 kilometres from Adelaide railway station by rail.

== History ==
=== Opening and upgrades ===
Cannawigara railway station was located between Wirrega and Bordertown on the Adelaide-Wolseley line, and it was on the Nairne to Bordertown section of the line which opened in 1886. The line opened in stages: on 14 March 1883 from Adelaide to Aldgate, on 28 November 1883 to Nairne, on 1 May 1886 to Bordertown and on 19 January 1887 to Serviceton. However, the locality did not receive a siding until 30 August 1911. In its early years, both names Cannawigra and Cannawigara were used to describe the railway station. Some controversy arose when the location was permanently changed to Cannawigara during the early 1940s, though this name was already being used by the railway department. The name is a corruption of the word Camiaguigara, a Tatiara clan which lived in the area. On 29 December 1943, a fire near Cannawigara along the railway line destroyed 180 acres of clover pasture, and it was found to have been caused by a freight train. Facilities to assist trucks loading onto trains were built in the years following World War Two, including stock yards and loading ramps in 1947, and a weighbridge in 1950.

=== Closure and present day ===
In 1978, the station and all associated infrastructure was included in the transfer of South Australian Railways to Australian National. The last service to use the station was the Bluebird railcar passenger service to Mount Gambier, known as the Blue Lake. When AN ceased all intrastate passenger services in South Australia including the Blue Lake, the station closed to passengers on December 31, 1990. The siding was fully closed on 31 December 1992 and all station infrastructure was later demolished, leaving the mainline track and signals.
