= Coomandook railway station =

Railway station in Coomandook, South Australia

Coomandook
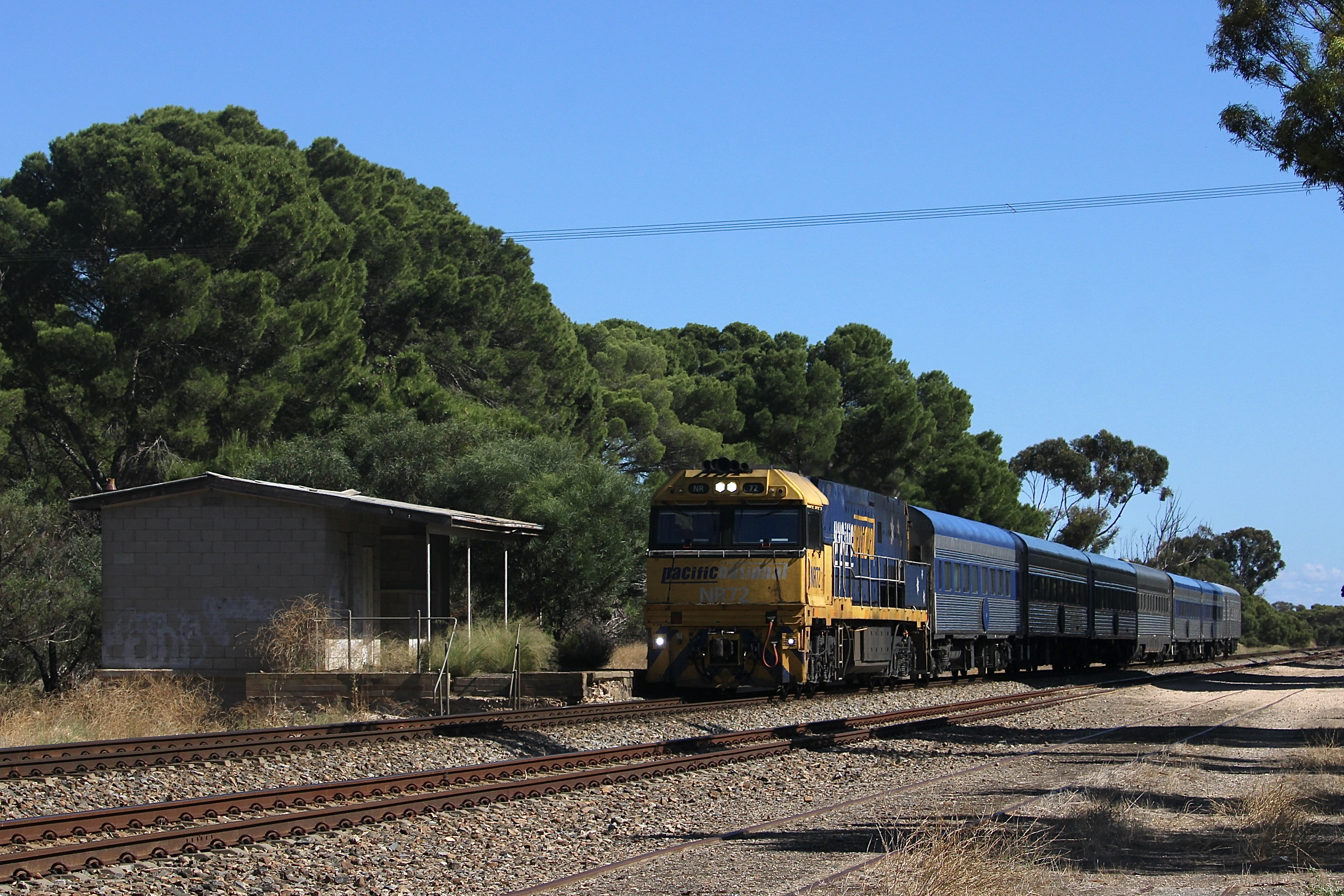
- The Overland passing the railway station at Coomandook, April 2023

General information
- Coordinates: 35.4707°S 139.6961°E
- System: Former Australian National regional rail
- Owner: Australian Rail Track Corporation
- Operator: South Australian Railways 1912 - 1978 Australian National 1978-1990
- Line: Adelaide-Wolseley
- Distance: 153 kilometres from Adelaide
- Platforms: 1

Construction
- Structure type: Ground

Other information
- Status: Closed

History
- Opened: 1 May 1912
- Closed: 31 December 1990

Services
Preceding station	Australian Rail Track Corporation	Following station
Cooke Plains towards Adelaide	Adelaide–Wolseley railway line	Yumali towards Serviceton
Location

Coomandook railway station was located in the town of Coomandook, about 153 kilometres from Adelaide station.

== History ==
Coomandook station was located between Cooke Plains and Yumali on the Adelaide-Wolseley line, and the line through Coomandook was opened in 1886 as part of the extension from Nairne to Bordertown. The line opened in stages: on 14 March 1883 from Adelaide to Aldgate, on 28 November 1883 to Nairne, on 1 May 1886 to Bordertown and on 19 January 1887 to Serviceton. However, a station at Coomandook was not included as part of the extension until a grant to build the station was made in 1910 and it was opened on 1 May 1912. The original station was replaced with a smaller brick building and platform in later years. This station design was also used at other stations on the Tailem Bend-Wolseley section of the line. The station closed on 31 December 1990 upon cessation of all AN intrastate services in South Australia. It remains in situ but has since been abandoned.

== Gallery ==
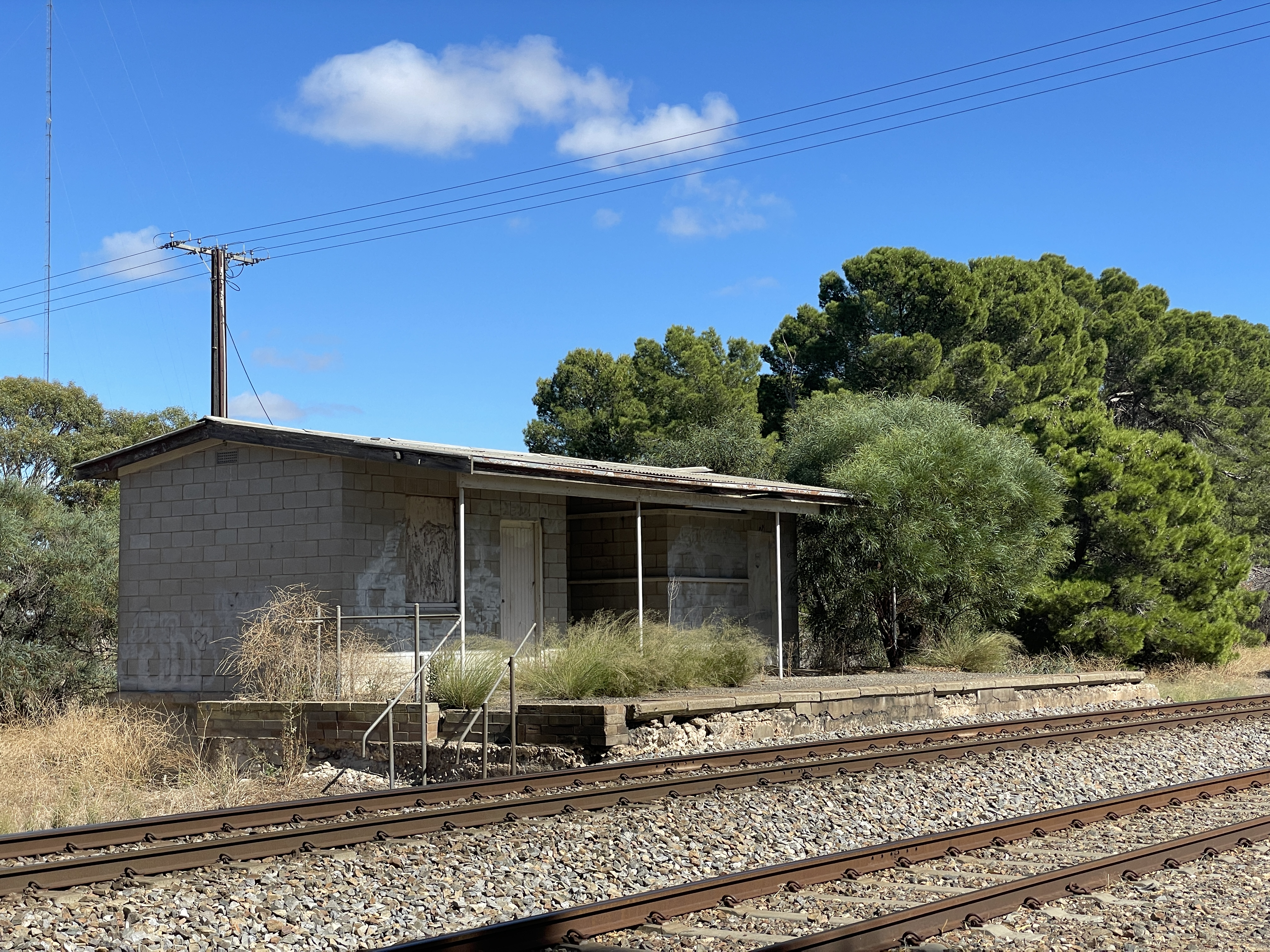
Railway station building viewed from the north east side

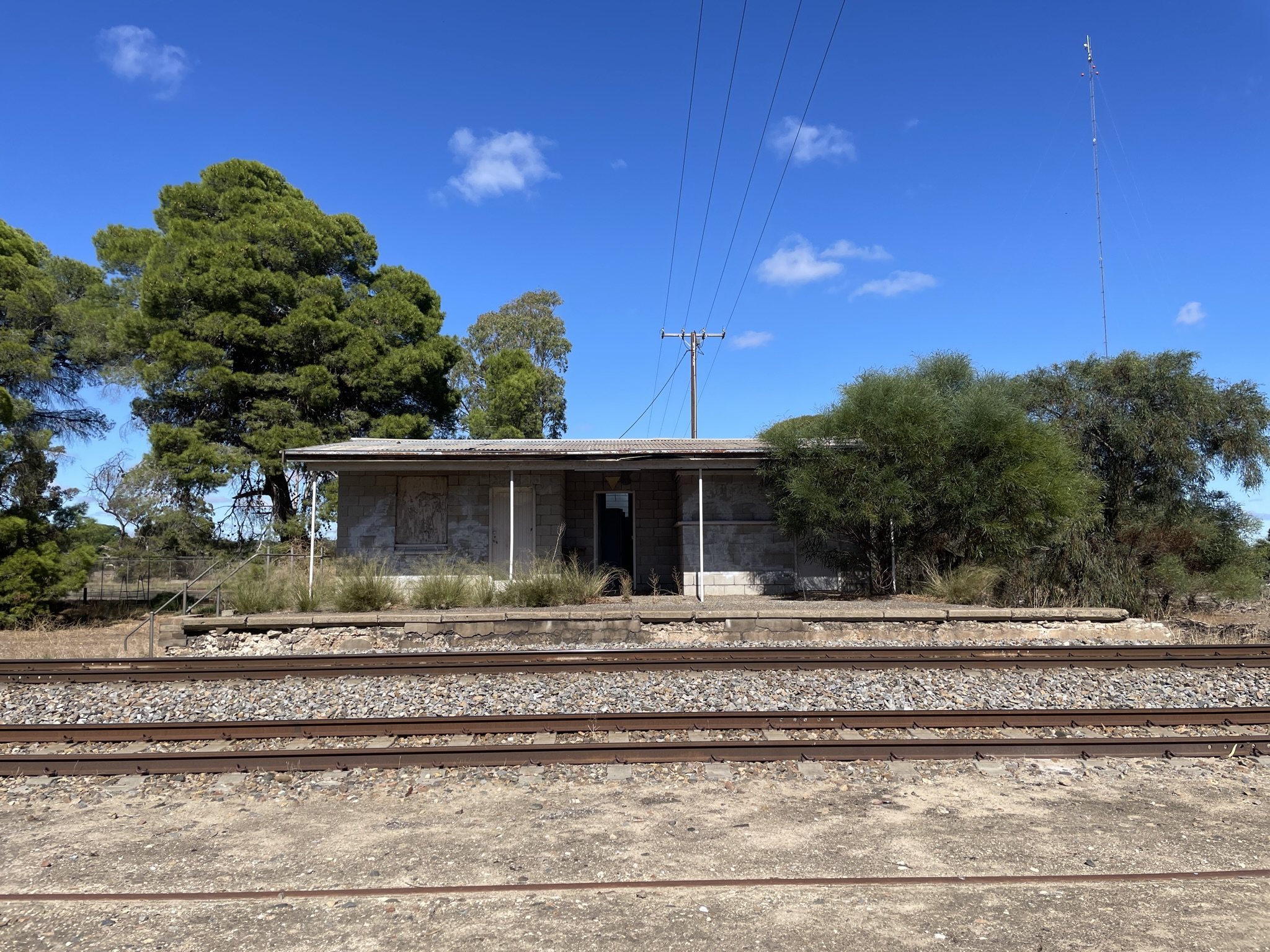
Railway station building viewed from the north side

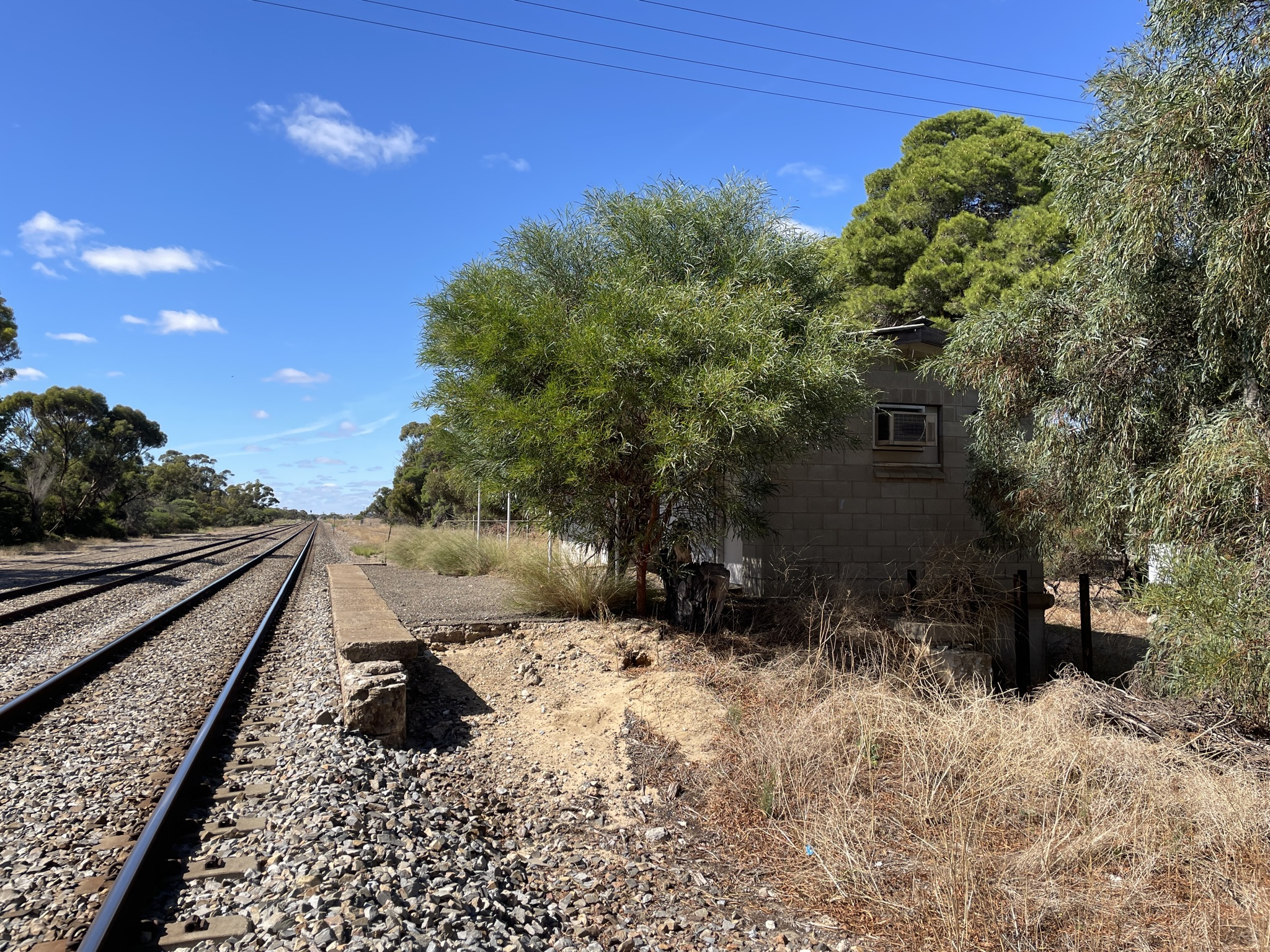
Railway station building viewed from the north west side

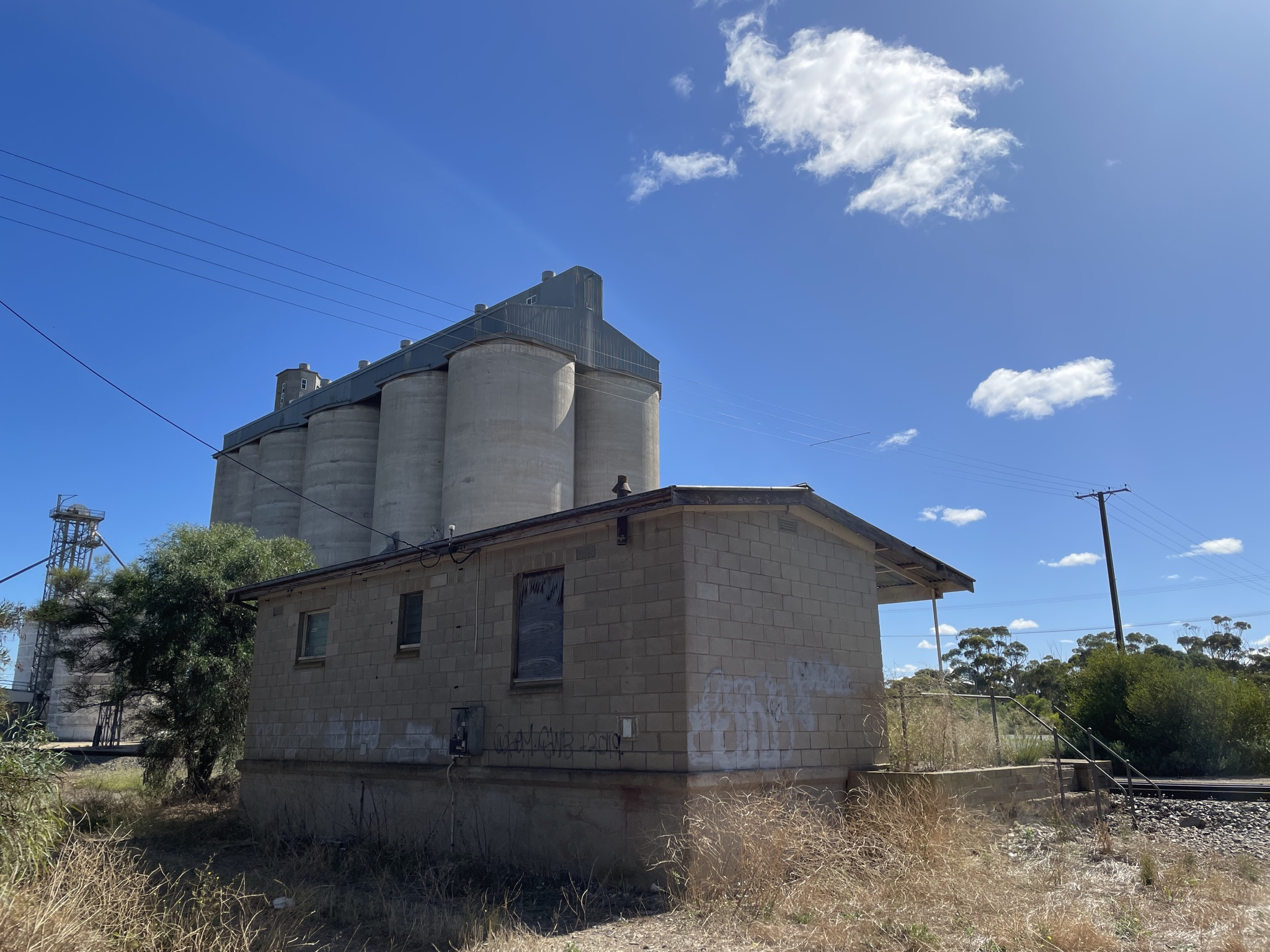
Railway station building viewed from the south side

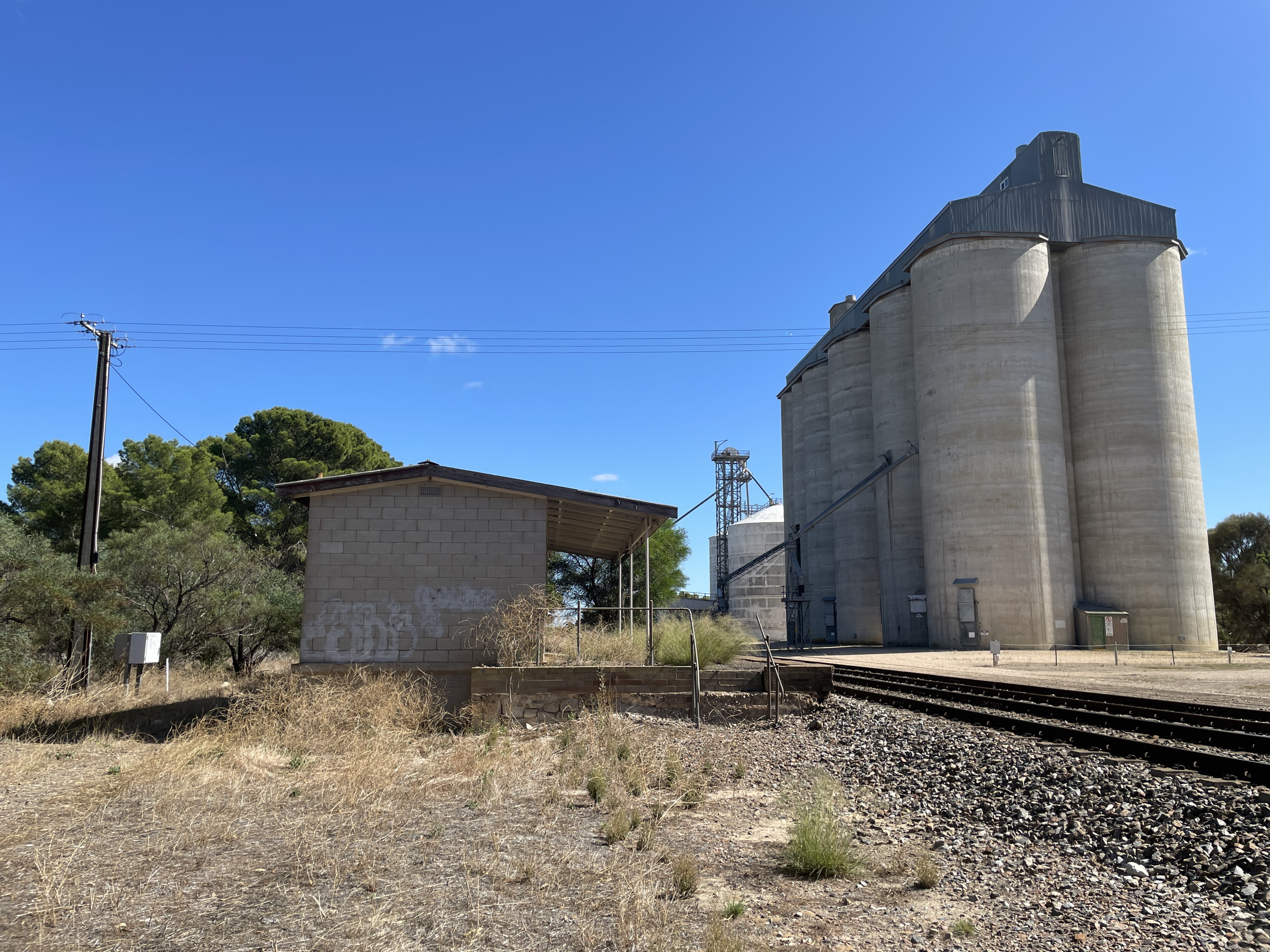
Railway station building viewed from the south east side

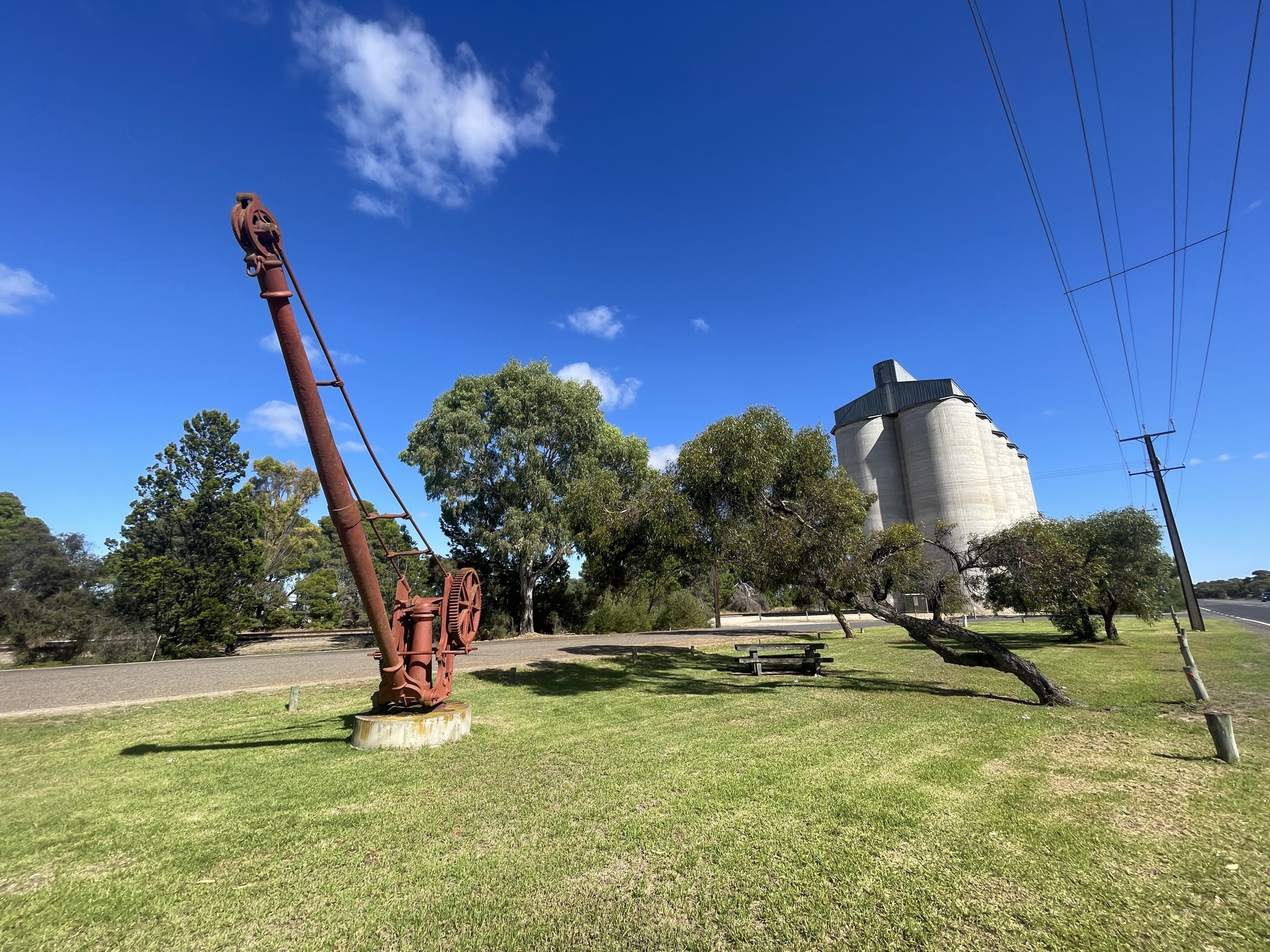
Railway crane and silos

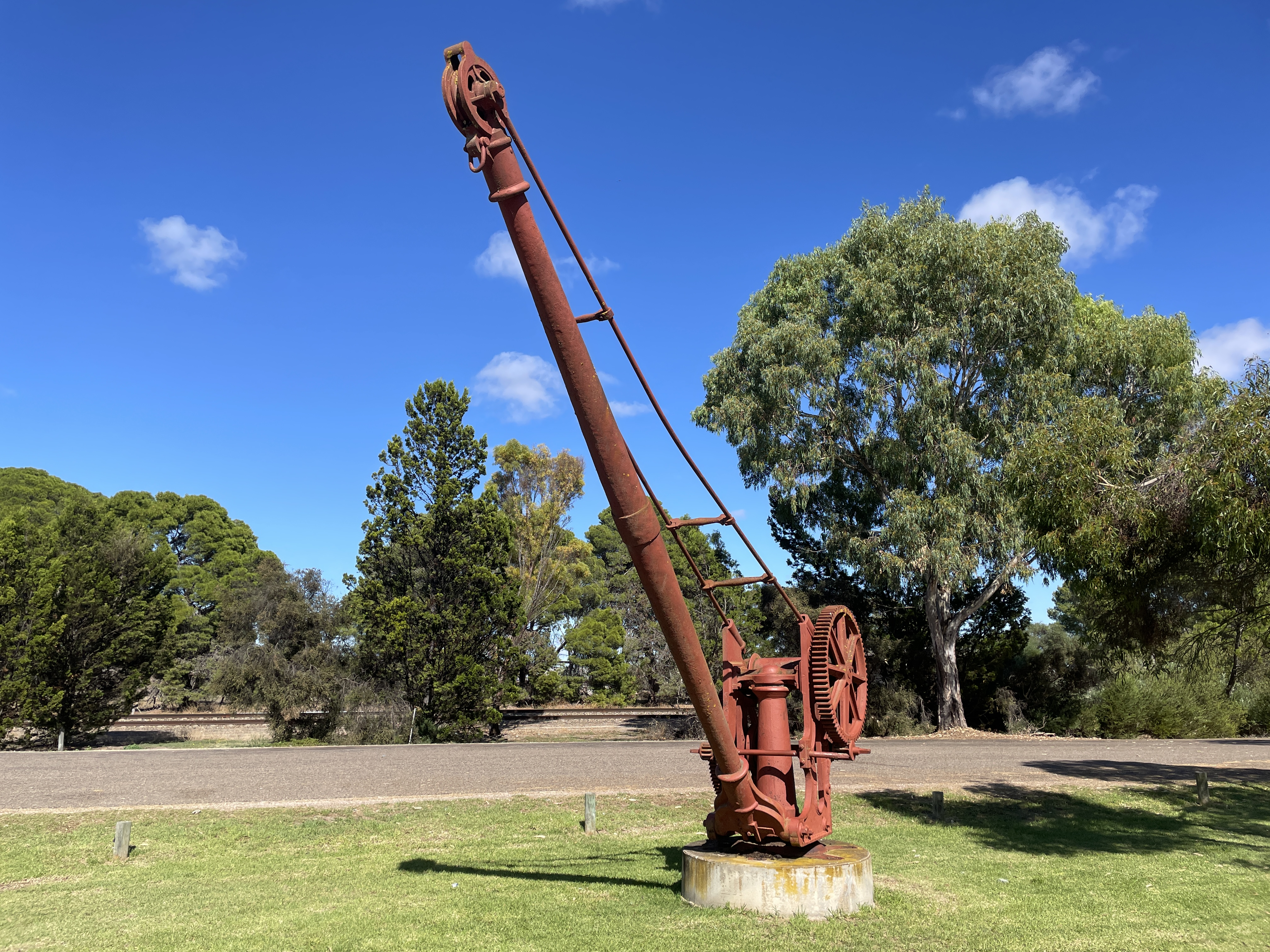
Railway crane relocated to the adjacent highway rest stop

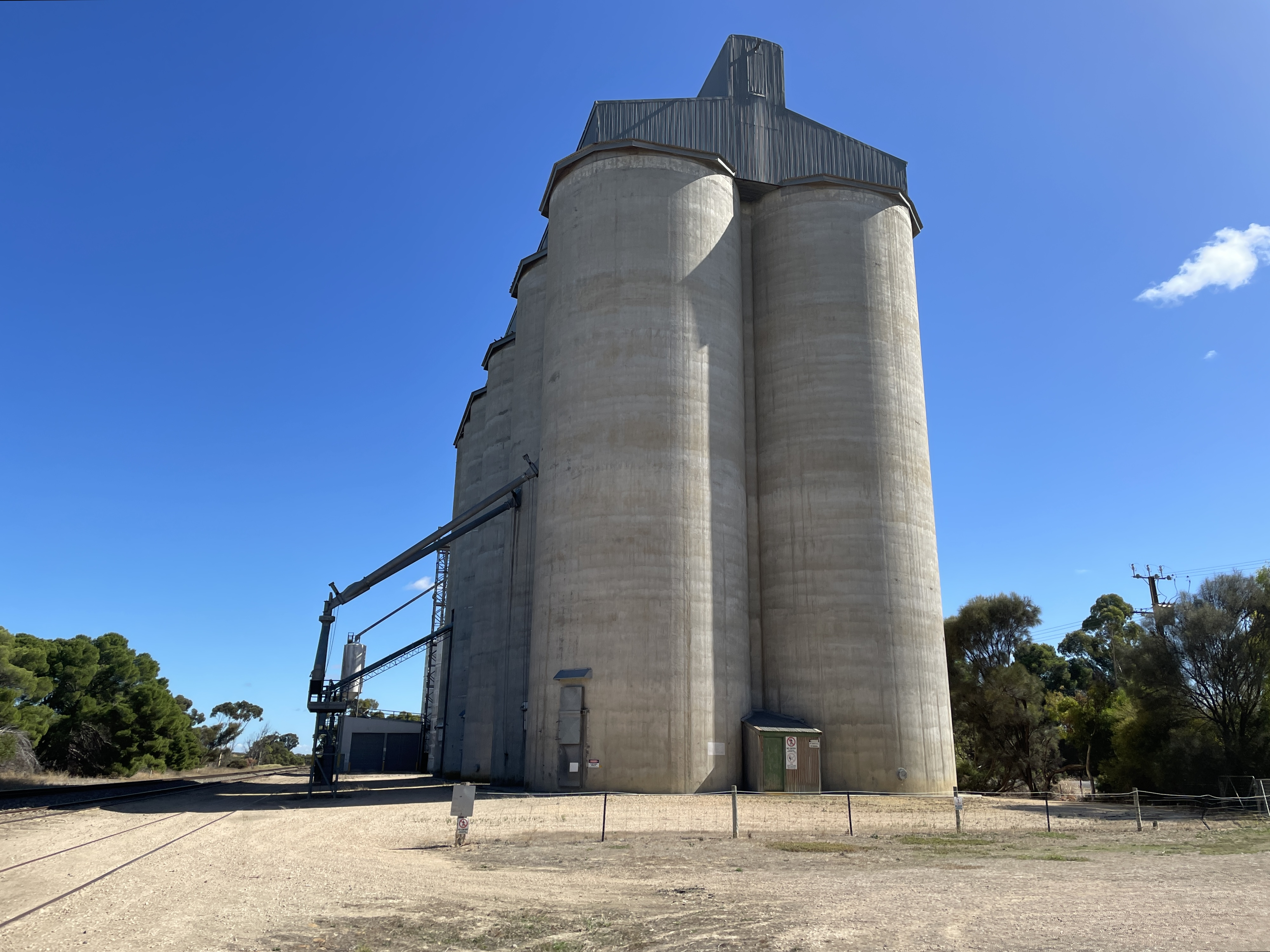
Grain silos owned by Viterra

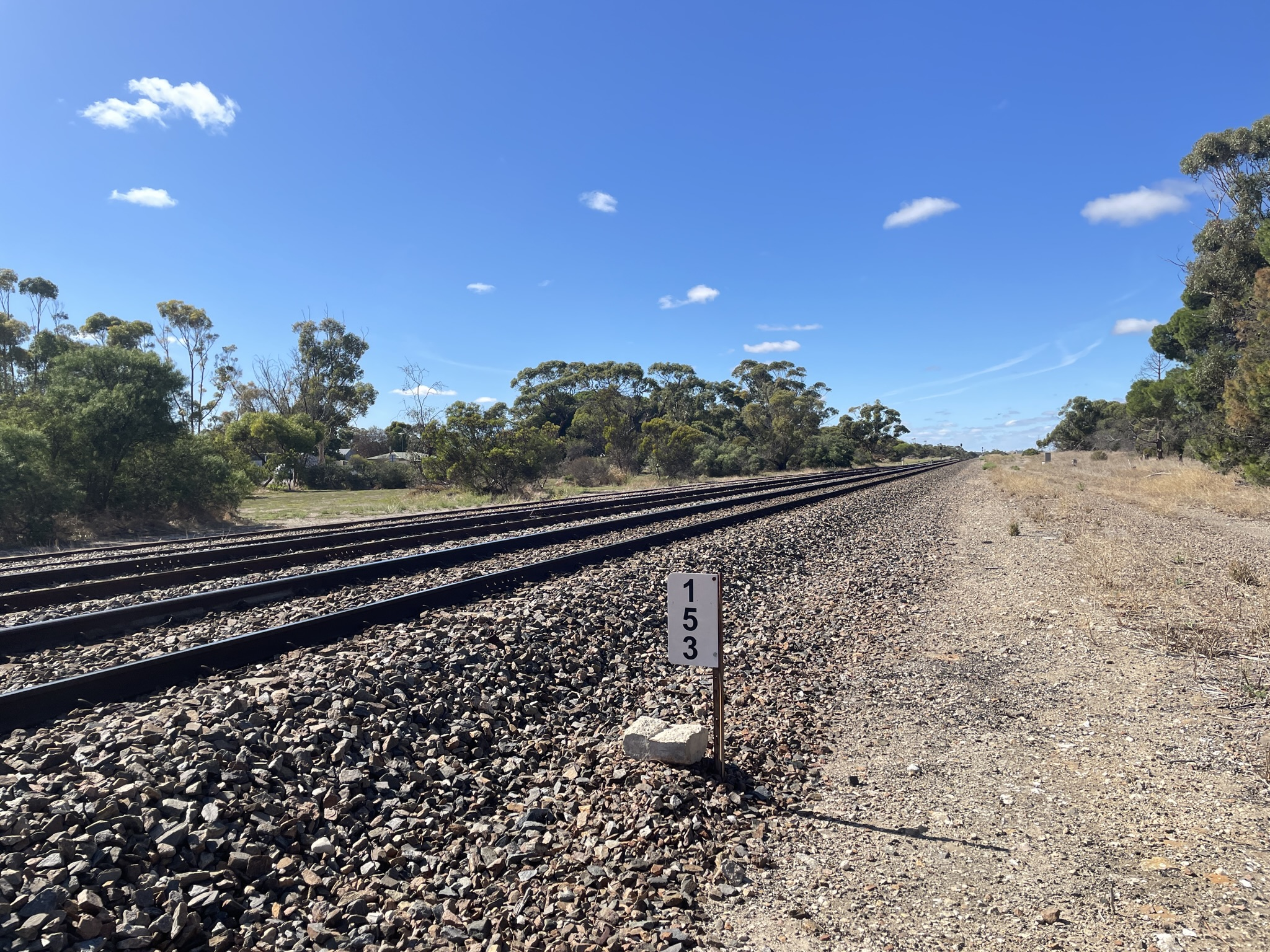
Km post showing 153km by rail from Adelaide
