= Murray Bridge railway station =

Railway station in South Australia

Murray Bridge
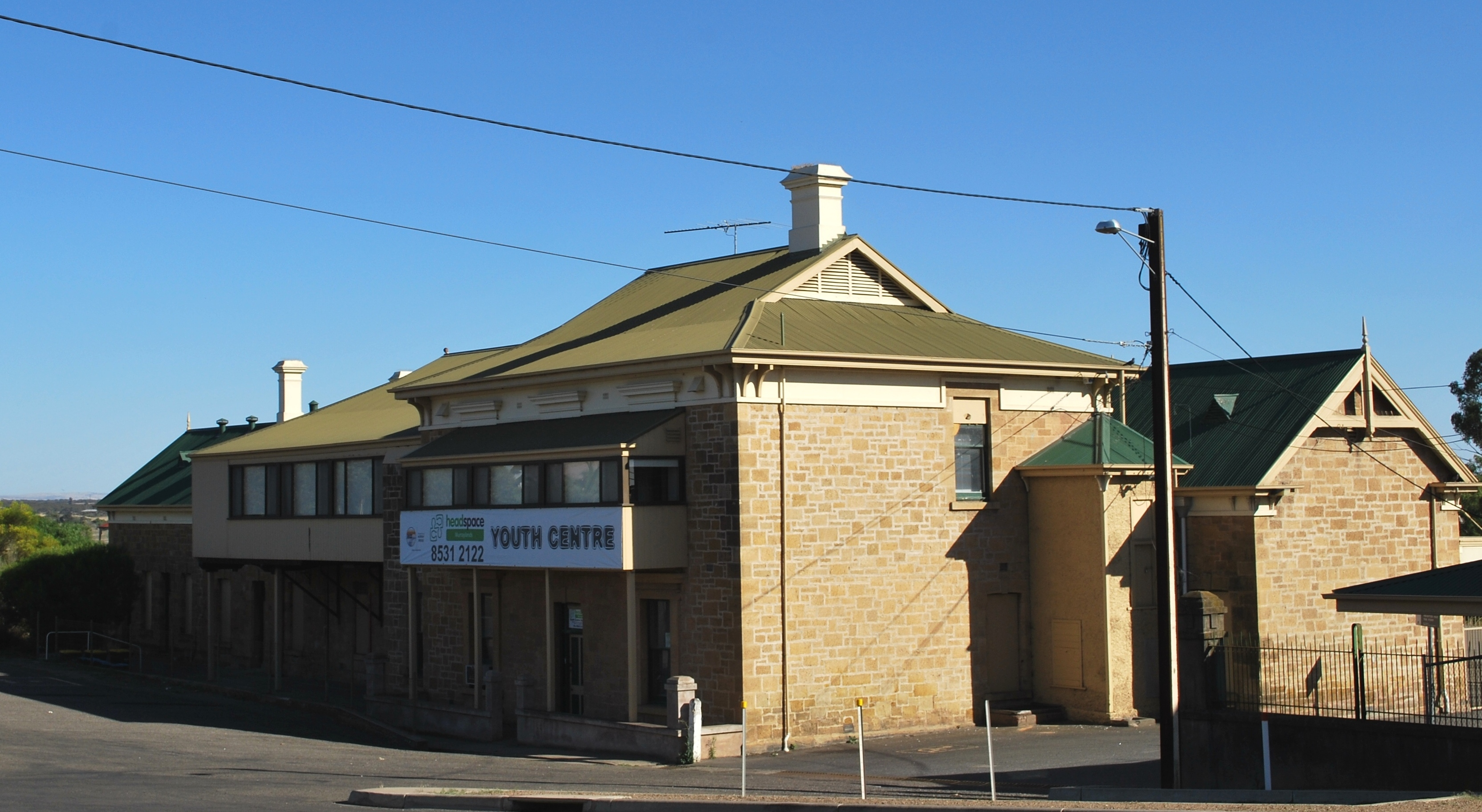
- Station building and entrance, January 2010

General information
- Location: Railway Terrace, Murray Bridge
- Coordinates: 35.117°S 139.267°E
- System: Journey Beyond Rail regional rail
- Operator: Journey Beyond
- Line: Adelaide-Wolseley
- Distance: 96.60 kilometres from Adelaide
- Platforms: 1
- Tracks: 2

Construction
- Structure type: Ground
- Accessible: Yes

Other information
- Status: Unstaffed

Services
Preceding station	Journey Beyond	Following station
Adelaide Terminus	The Overland	Bordertown towards Melbourne
Preceding station	Australian Rail Track Corporation	Following station
Monarto South towards Adelaide	Adelaide–Wolseley railway line	Monteith towards Serviceton
Location

Murray Bridge railway station is located on the Adelaide to Wolseley line serving the South Australian town of Murray Bridge.

== History ==
Murray Bridge station was opened in 1880s as part of the Adelaide-Wolseley railway line. The line opened in stages: on 14 March 1883 from Adelaide to Aldgate, on 28 November 1883 to Nairne, on 1 May 1886 to Bordertown and on 19 January 1887 to Serviceton. It was operated by South Australian Railways, in March 1978 it was transferred to Australian National and in July 1998 to the Australian Rail Track Corporation.

== Services ==
The only passenger rail service which stops at the station is Journey Beyond's twice weekly Overland service operating between Adelaide and Melbourne. Between 2024 and 2026, the station served an average of 1,517 passengers per year.
