= Wolseley railway station =

Former railway station in South Australia

Wolseley

General information
- Coordinates: 36.3653°S 140.9037°E
- Elevation: 108 m (354 ft)
- System: Former Great Southern Rail regional rail
- Owner: South Australian Railways 1886 - 1978 Australian National 1978 - 1998 Australian Rail Track Corporation 1998 - present
- Operator: South Australian Railways 1886 - 1978 Australian National 1978 - 1997 Great Southern Rail 1997 - 1999
- Line: Adelaide-Wolseley
- Distance: 307 kilometres from Adelaide
- Platforms: 2 (1 island)
- Tracks: 4

Construction
- Structure type: Ground

Other information
- Status: Closed and partially demolished

History
- Opened: 30 August 1911
- Closed: May 1999
- Former names: Tatiara

Services
Preceding station	Australian Rail Track Corporation	Following station
Bordertown towards Adelaide	Adelaide–Wolseley railway line	Serviceton Terminus
Preceding station	Australian National Railways Commission	Following station
Terminus	Mount Gambier railway line	Custon towards Mount Gambier
Location

Wolseley railway station was located at the junction of the Adelaide-Wolseley railway line and the Mount Gambier railway line. It served the town of Wolseley, South Australia.

== History ==
=== Opening ===
Wolseley railway station, originally known as Tatiara, was located on an extension of a narrow gauge railway line from Naracoorte, which later formed the Mount Gambier railway line. The first section was opened on 21 September 1881 from Naracoorte to University Block, later known as Custon. The line was opened through Wolseley to Bordertown on 31 March 1883. On 19 January 1887, Wolseley became a break of gauge station with the arrival of the broad gauge Adelaide-Wolseley railway line through to Serviceton. The line opened in stages: on 14 March 1883 from Adelaide to Aldgate, on 28 November 1883 to Nairne, on 1 May 1886 to Bordertown and on 19 January 1887 to Serviceton.

=== Station facilities and upgrades ===
As a break of gauge station, Wolseley had a substantial station yard, including a wooden station building attached to a signal box on an island platform, and goods facilities including a shed, crane and platforms that enabled the trans-shipping of goods between the broad gauge and narrow gauge lines. The goods facilities were lengthened in 1909 to cope with increasing goods demand. In 1924, servicing facilities for the narrow gauge locomotives were built at Wolseley, enabling the narrow gauge line to be truncated from Bordertown to Wolseley. A new wooden station building was built in 1938, measuring 33m (108ft) in length compared to the previous building which was 15m (50ft) long. In 1946, workers privately contracted with the trans-shipping of goods between broad and narrow gauge trains were involved in a dispute with their employer, stopping work for 2 days as the contractor intended on reducing their break times. During this period, 800 to 1000 tons of non-perishable goods were delayed at Wolseley, and station staff helped to move perishable goods.

=== Full conversion to broad gauge ===
Over the 1950s, Wolseley ceased to be a break of gauge station, following the opening of the broad gauge extension to Naracoorte on 1 February 1950, and to Mount Gambier on 23 June 1953, resulting in the removal of the narrow gauge line in 1959. In 1951, the interior of the yardmaster's office was damaged by fire. Operations at the station were significantly scaled back as trans-shipping was no longer required, as goods could now move through Wolseley to the South East without needing to change trains. During the 1960s, concrete grain silos were built, allowing grain to be loaded onto trains without the need for bagging. In 1977, the wooden station building and signal box were replaced by a besser block construction, with the relay building being built around the brick base of the signal box.

=== Closure and present day ===
In 1978, the station and all associated infrastructure was included in the transfer of South Australian Railways to Australian National. In later years, the station was used by the Bluebird railcar passenger service to Mount Gambier, known as the Blue Lake. It was also used by The Overland which travels between Adelaide and Melbourne. The Blue Lake was withdrawn completely with the cessation of all AN intrastate passenger services on 31 December 1990. In May 1999, the station was closed to passengers completely when The Overland, then operated by Great Southern Rail began operating on a new timetable that skipped multiple stations including Wolseley. The station building was demolished in February 2006, but the adjoining relay building was retained on the platform. The 1550m crossing loop remains in use, as do the Viterra grain silos which are still served by rail, mostly by Aurizon trains. The former goods facilities, including the shed, crane and platform remain disused. In June 2024, Viterra announced a $35M upgrade of the Wolseley grain site, including works such as new grain bunkers, a rail loop, and fast rail loading bins, bringing down the current loading time from 8 hours to under 2 hours. The works are expected to be complete by September 2025.
