= Adelaide–Wolseley railway line =

Railway line running from Adelaide to Wolseley

Adelaide-Wolseley railway line

Overview
- Owner: Australian Rail Track Corporation
- Termini: Adelaide; Wolseley
- Continues from: Adelaide-Port Augusta line
- Continues as: Western standard gauge line

Service
- Services: Belair Line; The Overland
- Operator(s): Journey Beyond; Aurizon; Pacific National; SCT Logistics

History
- Opened: 1887 (broad gauge)
- Reopened: 1995 (standardised)

Technical
- Line length: 313 km (194 mi)
- Number of tracks: 1
- Track gauge: 1435 mm (4 ft 8 1/2 in) standard gauge
- Old gauge: 1600 mm (5 ft 3 in)

The Adelaide–Wolseley railway line, 313 kilometres (194 miles) long in the Australian state of South Australia, is a component section of the interstate railway line between Adelaide and Melbourne, running from Adelaide to Wolseley. Between 1887 and 1975, the line was owned and operated by the South Australian Railways. During this period, trains did not operate outside each state and, since Wolseley station was 6 kilometres (3.7 miles) from the border with Victoria, it was a busy centre for transferring freight between wagons, passengers between carriages, and for servicing South Australian locomotives. This impediment was despite the railways of the two colonies being built to the same gauge, 1600 mm (5 ft 3 in) broad gauge. In 1995, the line was converted to 1435 mm (4 ft 8 1/2 in) standard gauge and the name "Adelaide–Wolseley railway line" was discontinued. The line is now owned by the Australian Rail Track Corporation.

== History ==
The line opened in stages: on 14 March 1883 from Adelaide to Aldgate, on 28 November 1883 to Nairne, on 1 May 1886 to Bordertown and on 19 January 1887 to Serviceton. The line consisted of double track as far as Belair, where it became single track for the remainder of the journey east. Along its 313 km length, there are 18 crossing loops. In 1995, the track was converted to standard gauge as part of the gauge conversion of the line to Melbourne. This included one of the lines west of Belair, effectively converting this section to two single lines. In 2009, the Belair line was relaid with dual gauge sleepers that will allow it to be converted to standard gauge in the future.

Originally operated by South Australian Railways, in March 1978, it was transferred to Australian National and in July 1998 to the Australian Rail Track Corporation. Until April 1987, the State Transport Authority operated passenger services on the first 37 kilometres of the line from Adelaide to Bridgewater until they were curtailed to Belair, the terminus of today's Adelaide Metro Belair line. TransAdelaide succeeded the STA in operating the line in 1994.

== Route ==
As shown in the route map. major towns on the route include Murray Bridge, Tailem Bend, Keith, Bordertown and Wolseley.

== Former branch lines ==
- Mount Pleasant railway line: opened 1918 (closed in 1963, line has been removed)
- Victor Harbor railway line: opened 1884 (last passenger service in 1984; now a heritage tourist railway)
- Sedan railway line: opened 1919 (closed 2005)
- Loxton railway line: opened 1913 (last train 2015, now mothballed)
- Pinnaroo railway line: opened 1906 (last train 2015, now mothballed)
- Mount Gambier railway line: opened 1887 (isolated by rail gauge in 1995, now mothballed).

== Services ==
Today the route is mainly served by interstate freight services operated by Pacific National and SCT Logistics. Intrastate grain freight services from the Loxton and Pinnaroo lines operated by Genesee & Wyoming Australia ceased operating in July 2015. Grain services from Tailem Bend and Wolseley run regularly via Aurizon trains.

Journey Beyond's The Overland is the only scheduled passenger service to traverse the full route, calling at Murray Bridge and Bordertown stations. Adelaide Metro services operate from Adelaide to Belair.

Prior to December 1990, the Blue Lake passenger to Mount Gambier served some towns along the line till Wolseley. The Blue Lake was withdrawn completely with the cessation of all AN intrastate passenger services on 31 December 1990.
