= Bordertown railway station =

Railway station in South Australia

Bordertown
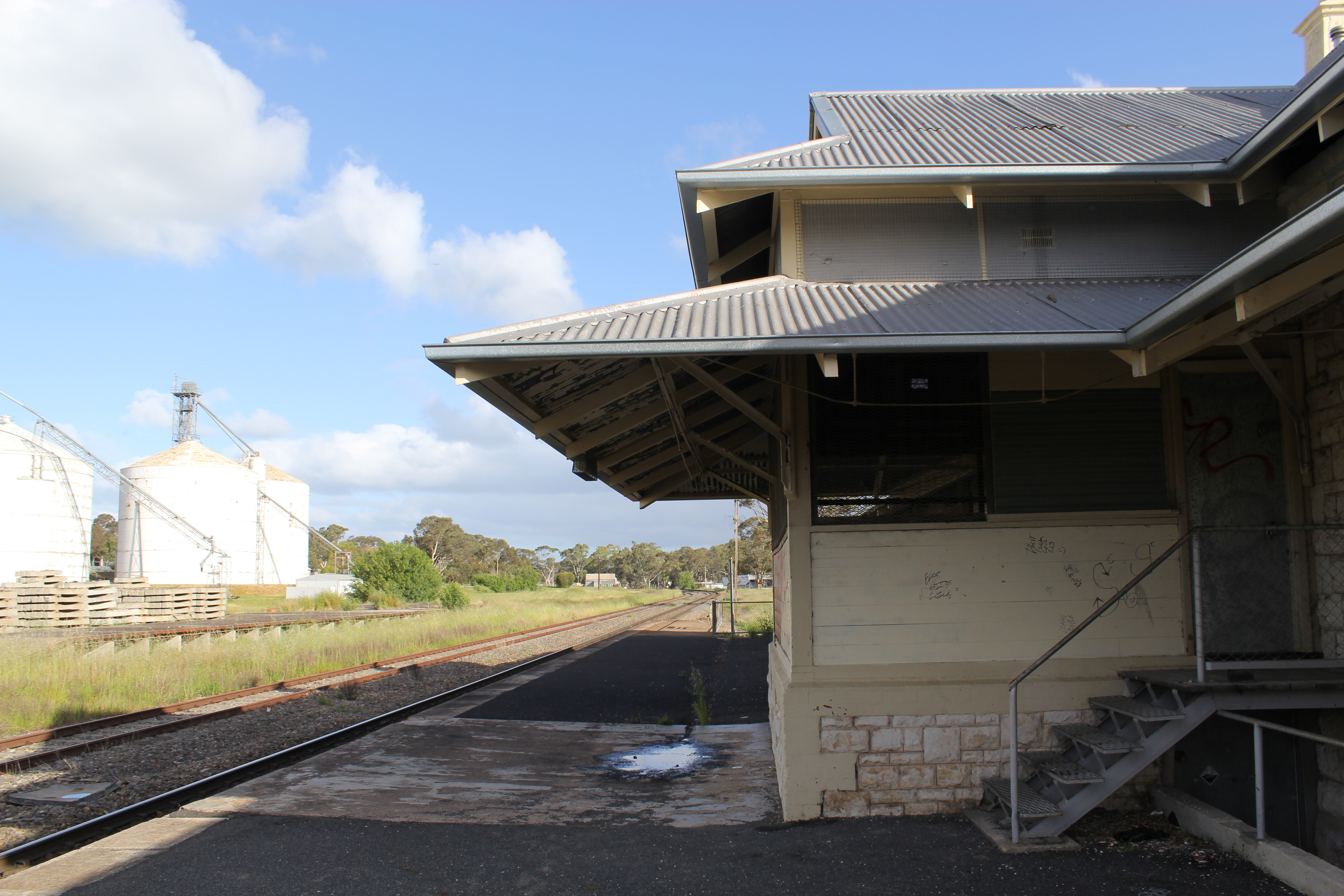
- Eastbound view, October 2013

General information
- Location: Hay Avenue, Bordertown
- Coordinates: 36°18′38″S 140°46′38″E
- Operator: Journey Beyond
- Line: Adelaide-Wolseley
- Distance: 293.90 kilometres from Adelaide
- Platforms: 1
- Tracks: 2

Construction
- Structure type: Ground
- Accessible: Yes

Other information
- Status: Unstaffed

History
- Opened: 1914

Services
Preceding station	Journey Beyond	Following station
Murray Bridge towards Adelaide	The Overland	Nhill towards Melbourne
Preceding station	Australian Rail Track Corporation	Following station
Cannawigara towards Adelaide	Adelaide–Wolseley railway line	Wolseley towards Serviceton
Location

Bordertown railway station is located on the Adelaide to Wolseley line in Bordertown, Australia.

== History ==
The railway arrived in Bordertown on 22 September 1881 when the Kingston SE to Narracoorte line was extended north. It was connected via rail to Adelaide in 1886 with the arrival of the Adelaide-Wolseley line. The current station was built in 1914.

The railway station was listed on the South Australian Heritage Register on 22 September 1994.

== Services ==
The only passenger rail service which stops at the station is Journey Beyond's twice weekly Overland service operating between Adelaide and Melbourne.
