= Nairne railway station =

Former railway station in South Australia

Nairne
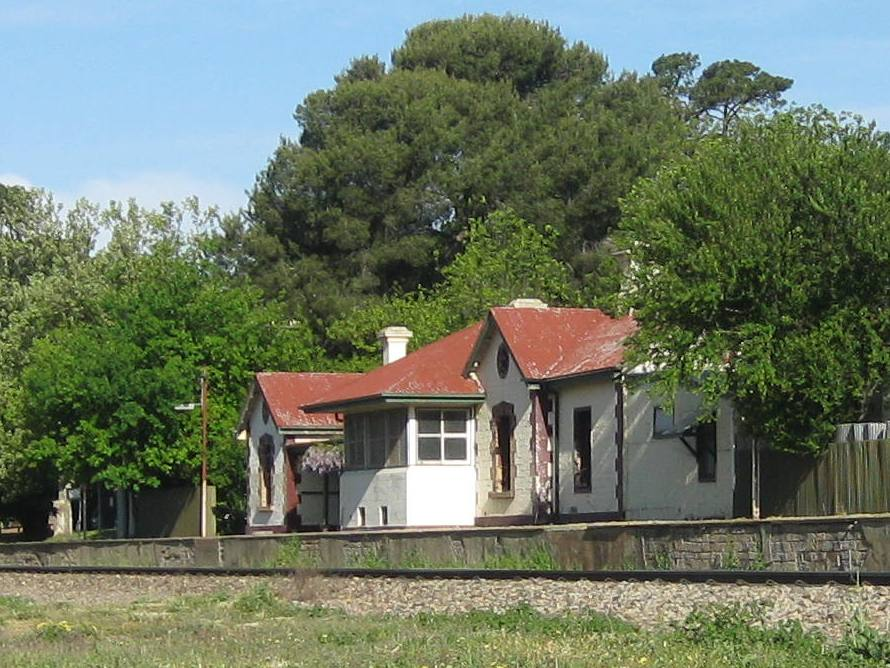
- Nairne station building in 2012

General information
- Location: De-Gacher Street, Nairne
- Coordinates: 35.0347°S 138.9055°E
- System: Former South Australian railway station
- Owner: South Australian Railways 1883–1978; Australian National Railways Commission 1978–1998; Australian Rail Track Corporation 1998–
- Line: Adelaide–Wolseley
- Distance: 56.1 km (34.9 mi) from Adelaide by rail
- Platforms: 1 (previously 2)
- Tracks: 1

Construction
- Structure type: Ground

Other information
- Status: Closed

History
- Opened: 27 November 1883
- Closed: 31 December 1990

Services
Preceding station	Australian Rail Track Corporation	Following station
Mount Barker Junction towards Adelaide	Adelaide–Wolseley railway line	Petwood towards Serviceton
Location

Nairne railway station is a closed railway station on the Adelaide–Melbourne railway line, which passes through the Adelaide Hills town of Nairne. It is 56.1 km (34.9 mi) by rail from Adelaide station or 30.3 kilometres (18.8 miles) in a direct line south-east from the centre of Adelaide.

== History ==
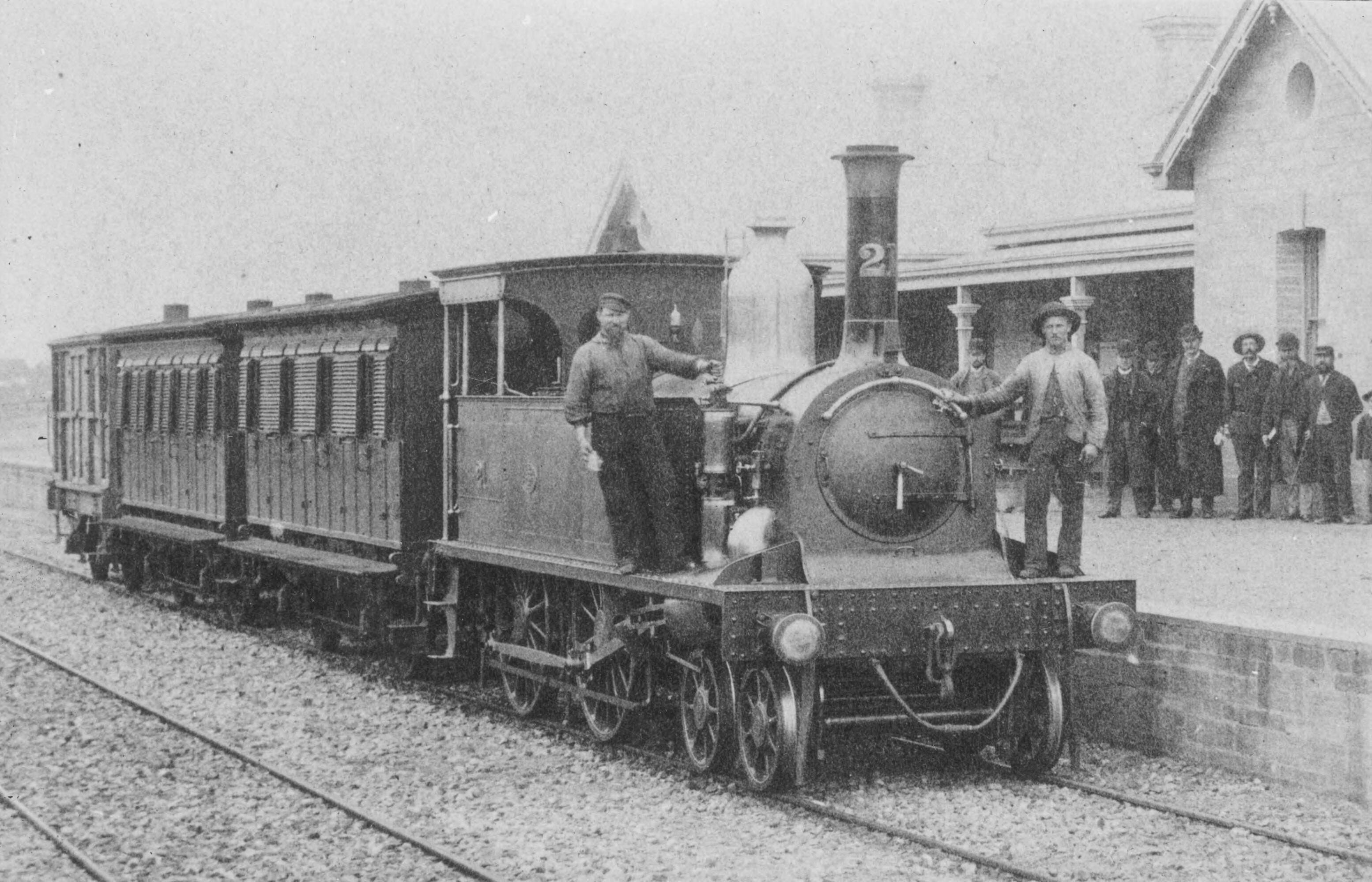
A train at Nairne station bound for Strathalbyn and Milang, about 1884; the locomotive is no. 21 of the first F class

Nairne station opened on 27 November 1883 as the interim terminus of the Adelaide–Wolseley line. The station's facilities were similar to that of Balhannah, except the station building was made of stone. Nairne station had two platforms; the smaller one had a 45-metre platform with a small shelter.

The station closed on 31 December 1990 when the Adelaide–Mount Gambier passenger service ceased. The original station building and goods shed remain, but the smaller platform was demolished about 1994 during works to convert the line to standard gauge.

The building in 2024 is the headquarters of the Nairne & Districts Lions Club, which has, as one of its projects, the renovation and rehabilitation of the station precinct.
