= Serviceton railway station =

Former railway station in Victoria, Australia

Serviceton
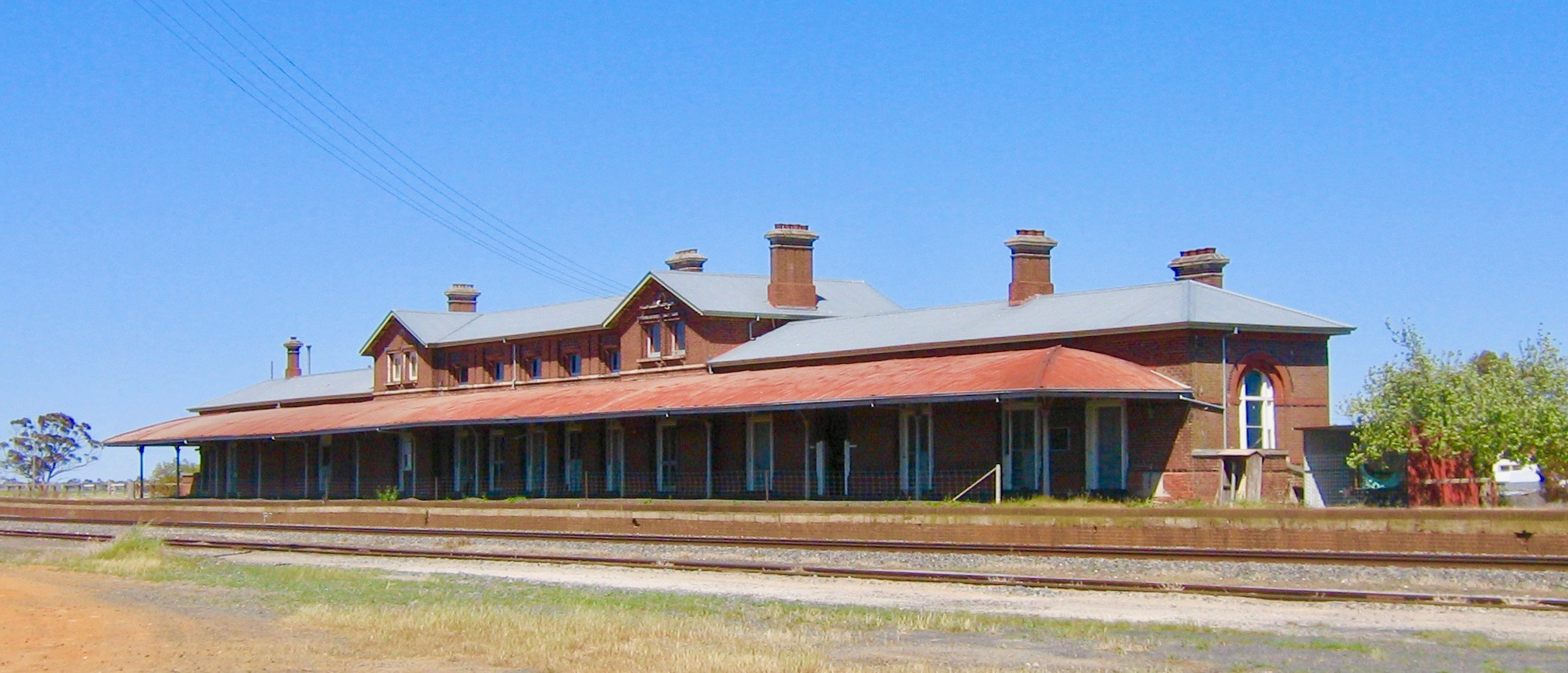
- Serviceton station in 2006

General information
- Location: Elizabeth Street, Serviceton
- Coordinates: 36°22′33″S 140°59′09″E
- System: Former Victorian Railways and V/Line regional rail
- Owner: Victorian Railways then VicTrack
- Lines: Western standard gauge Adelaide-Wolseley
- Distance: 461.7 kilometres (286.9 miles) by rail from Southern Cross railway station, Melbourne
- Platforms: 1
- Tracks: 1

Construction
- Structure type: Ground

Other information
- Status: Closed

History
- Opened: 1889
- Closed: 1984

Services
Preceding station	Australian Rail Track Corporation	Following station
Lillimur towards Southern Cross	Western standard gauge railway line	Wolseley Terminus
Location

Serviceton railway station is located on the Western standard gauge line in Victoria, Australia, in the small town of Serviceton, 461.7 kilometres (286.9 miles) by rail from Melbourne. Opened in 1889 and closed in 1984, it has since been leased to West Wimmera Shire Council for use by community groups.

== History ==
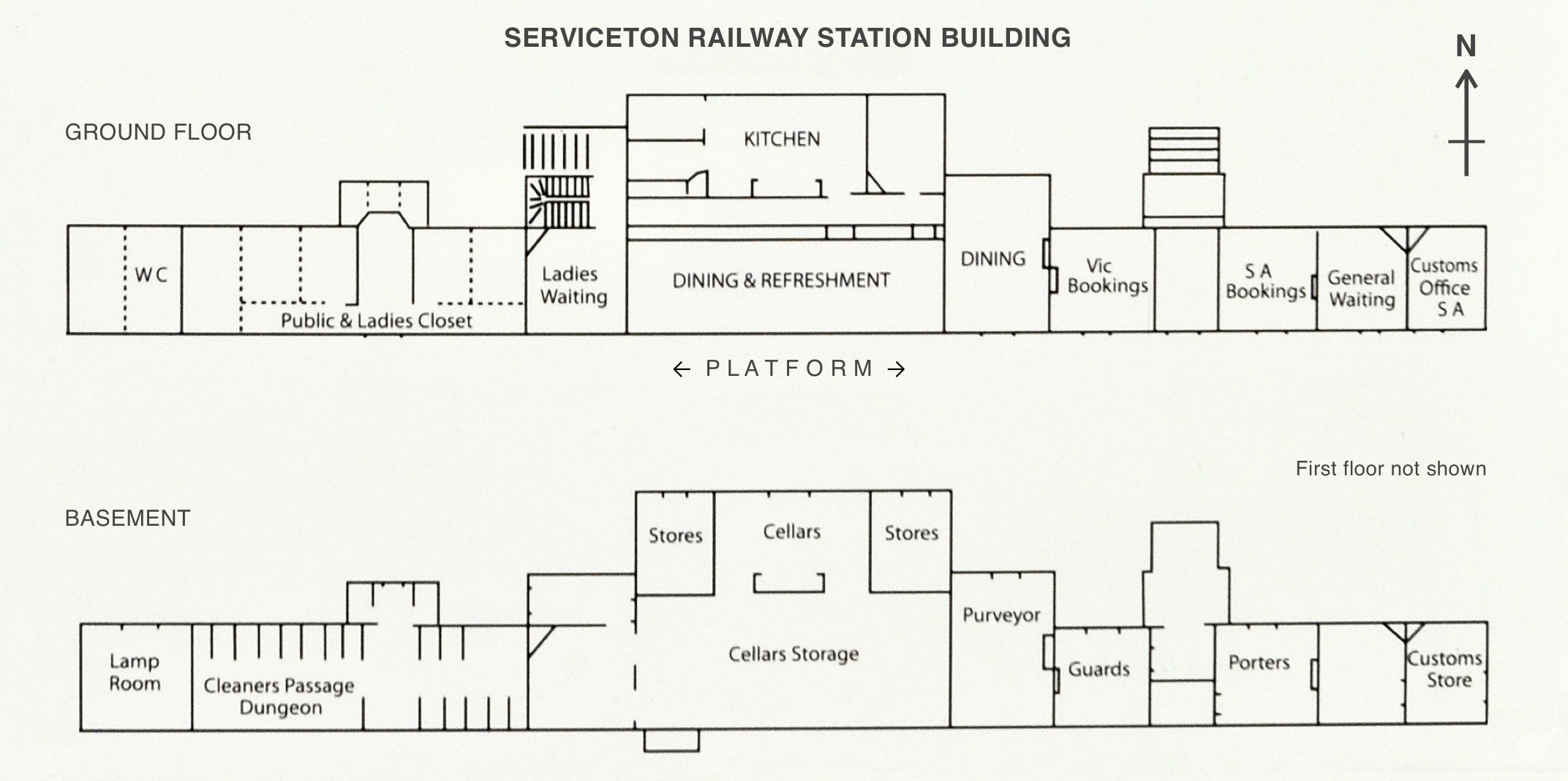
The station's unique facilities included two ticket offices operated separately by the Victorian and South Australian railways, and cross-border customs facilities

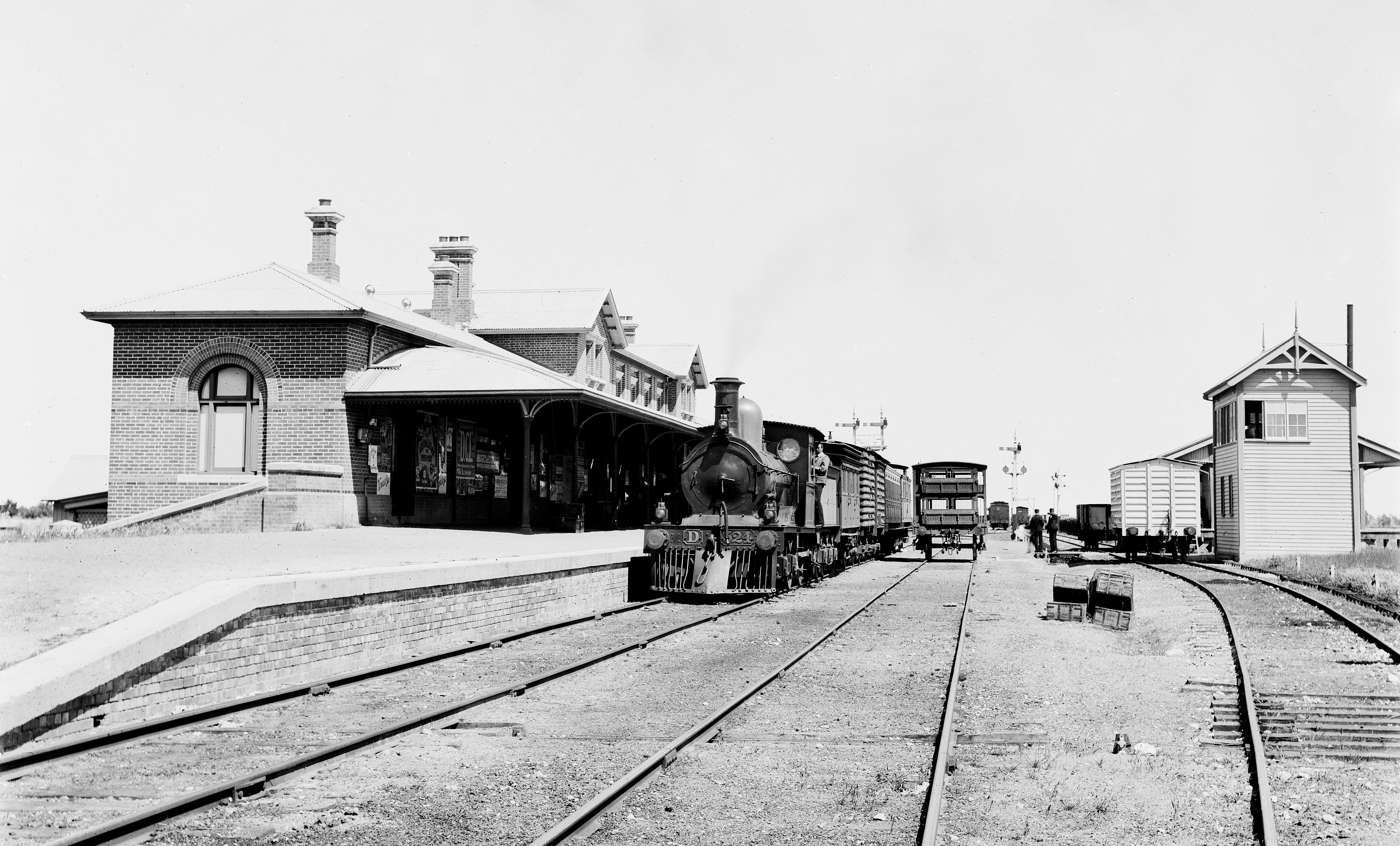
Victorian Railways mixed train at Serviceton station in the 1910s

The Adelaide-Wolseley line was extended from Bordertown in South Australia on 19 January 1887 coinciding with the opening of the line from Dimboola in Victoria.

The Premier of South Australia, John Downer, wrote to his Victorian equivalent, James Service, suggesting that the new border railway town and station be named Downer after him. Service wrote back and said that as it was in Victoria, it would be named Serviceton after himself, although at the time of construction the land was claimed by both colonies.

As Serviceton was the border station and train crews could only operate within their own state, crews and locomotives were changed between the South Australian Railways and Victorian Railways. A customs house/railway station was commissioned in 1887 with costs shared between the two colonies. The complex of 15 main rooms, including a large refreshment room, was completed in 1889. Reflecting its positioning at the border of two colonies before Australia's Federation, it included customs facilities; similarly there were two separate ticket offices, each operated by the respective Victorian and South Australian railways.

With federation, customs roles finished in January 1901 although trains would continue to changes locomotives until the 1980s.

On 7 September 1951, the westbound Overland service collided with its eastbound equivalent at the station, killing one person and destroying four A2 class locomotives.

In 1970, the station was listed by the National Trust of Victoria for its part in the border dispute. Victorian Railways DRC railcar services from Horsham to Serviceton ceased in December 1978. The refreshment rooms closed in 1981 and the station closed in 1986.

The station ceased to be a crew change-over and train-passing location in March 1984 after a new crossing loop opened at Dimboola and VicRail commissioned a new Centralized Traffic Control signalling system on the Western Line west of Ararat. The station closed on 1 May; Wolseley then became the western limit of the new system.

In 2011, the station building was restored by VicTrack and leased to West Wimmera Shire Council for use by community groups. Since then it has housed a display of local and railway memorabilia.

The Overland previously called at Serviceton on its journey between Adelaide and Melbourne, but no longer stops there.

== In popular culture ==
American singer Tom Waits included the closure of the station in his song "Town with No Cheer," in his 1983 album Swordfishtrombones.

== Gallery ==
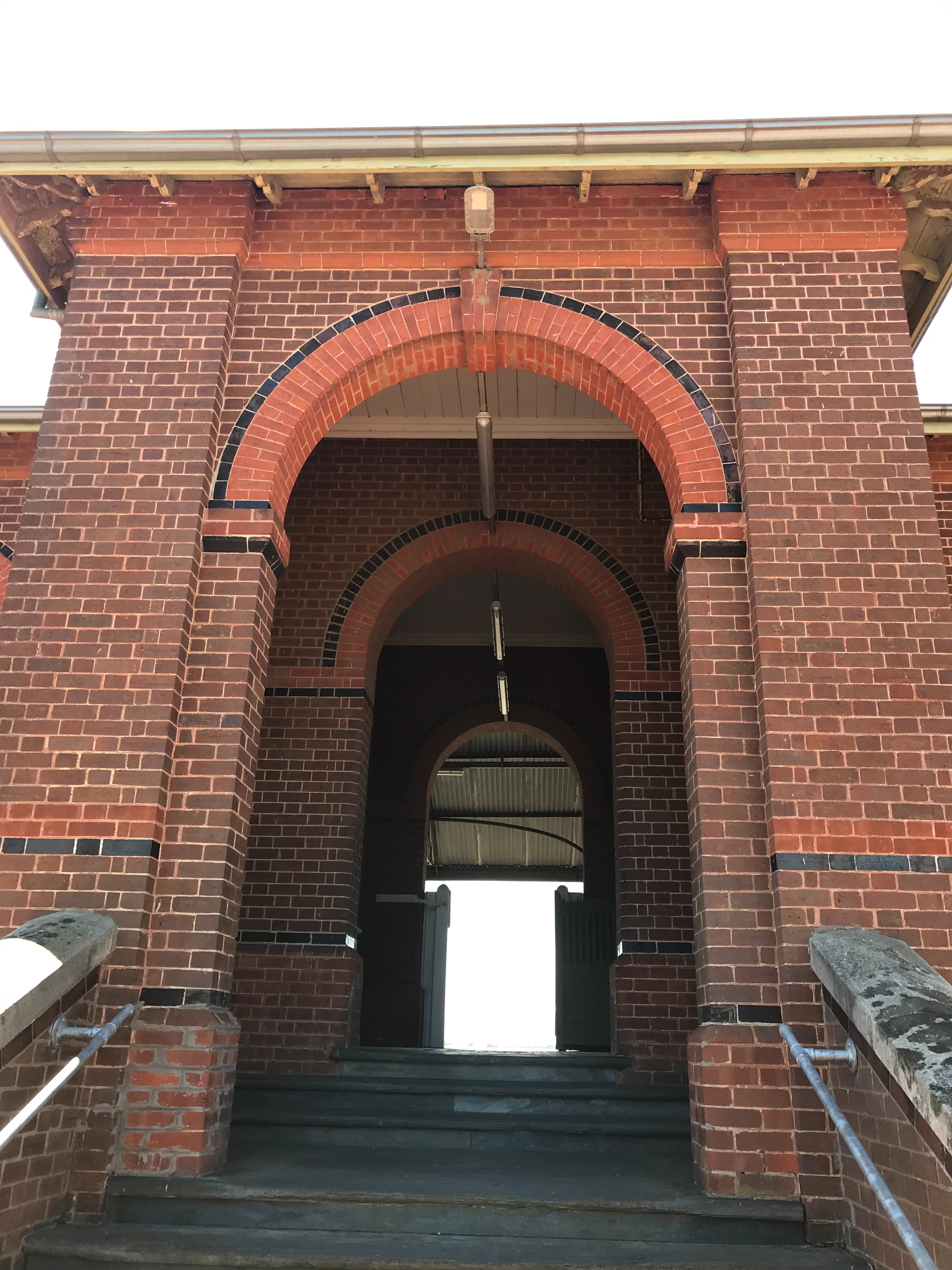

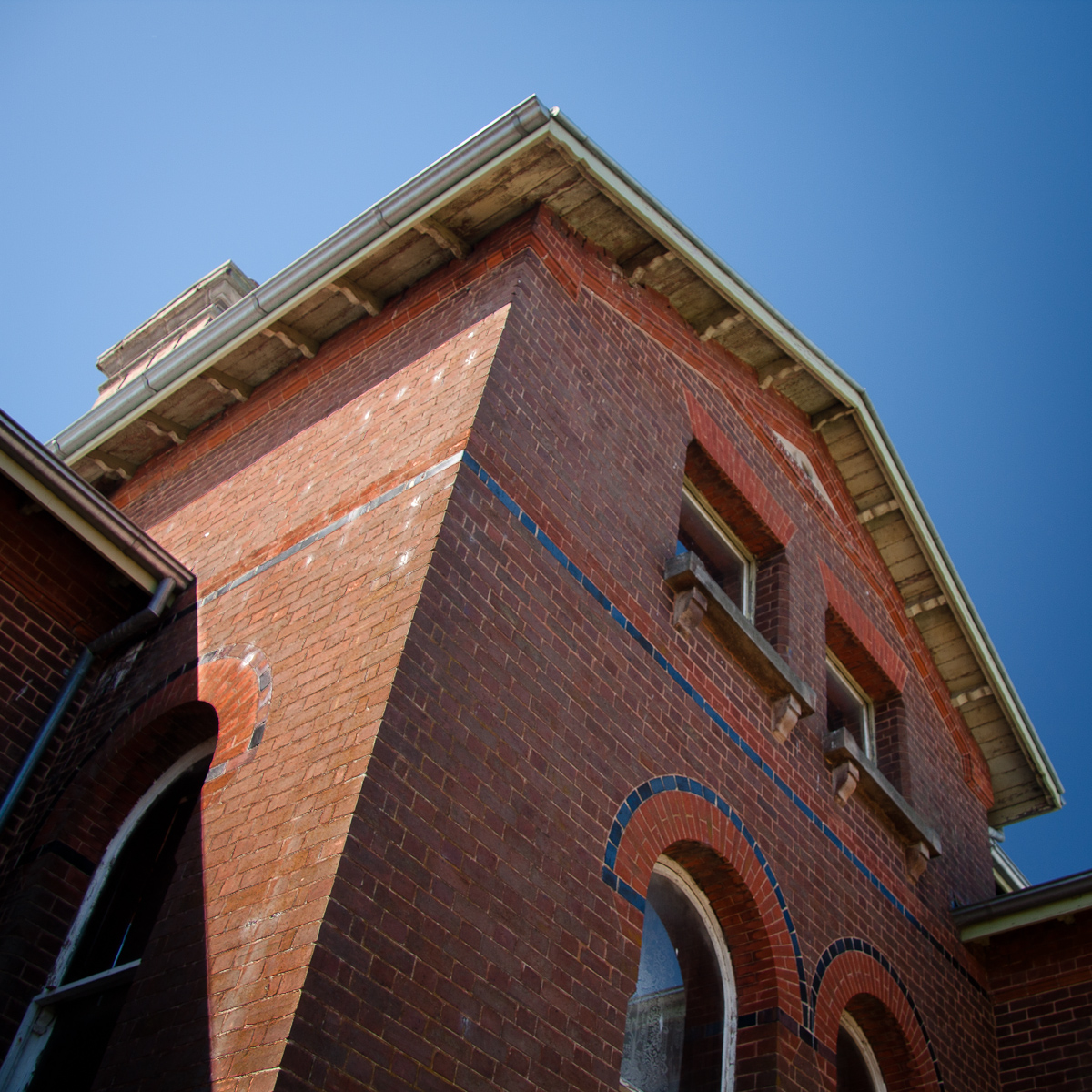

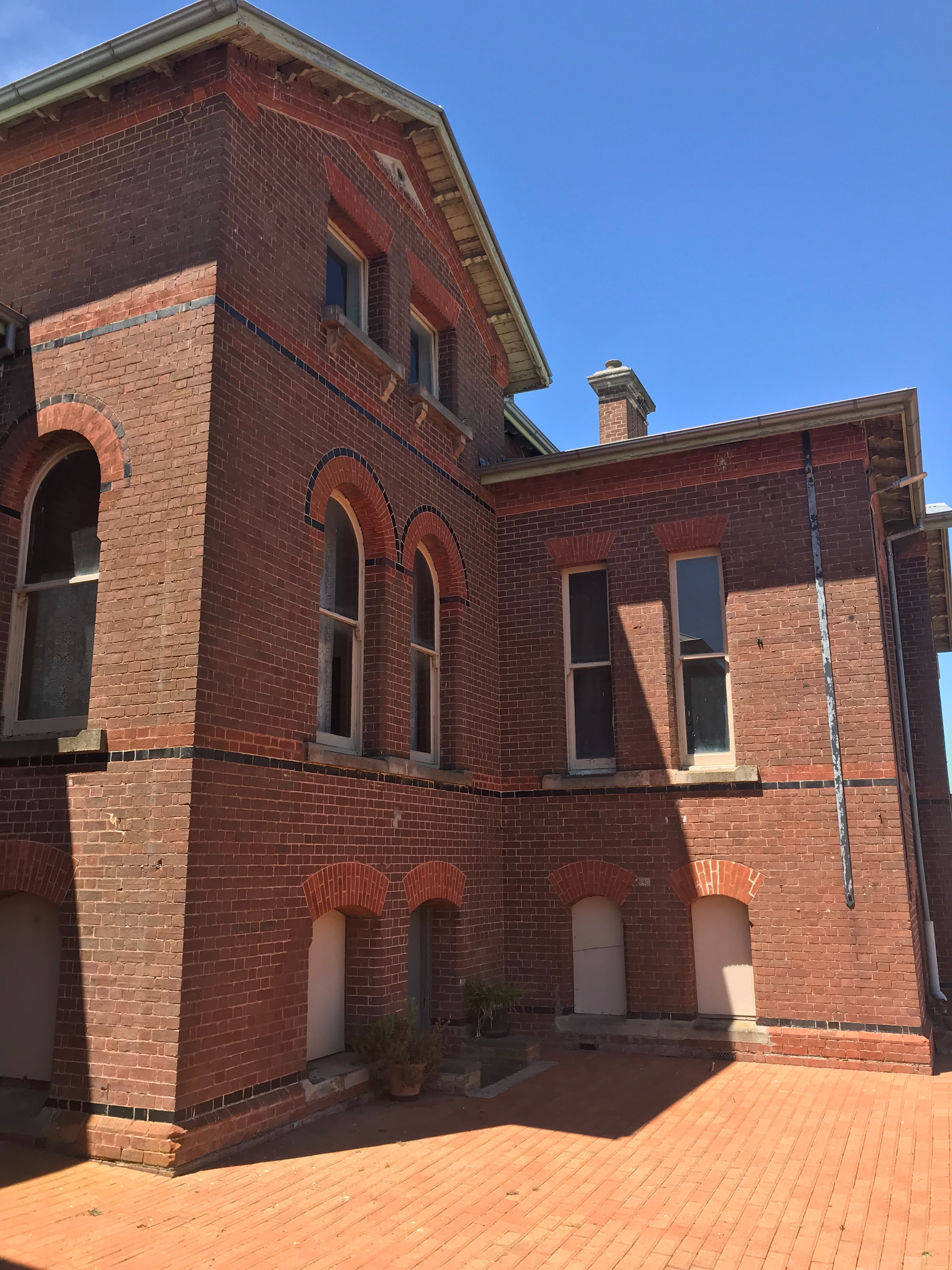

Staircase to the station entrance

Intricate 19th century brickwork

Walls of Horsham red brick

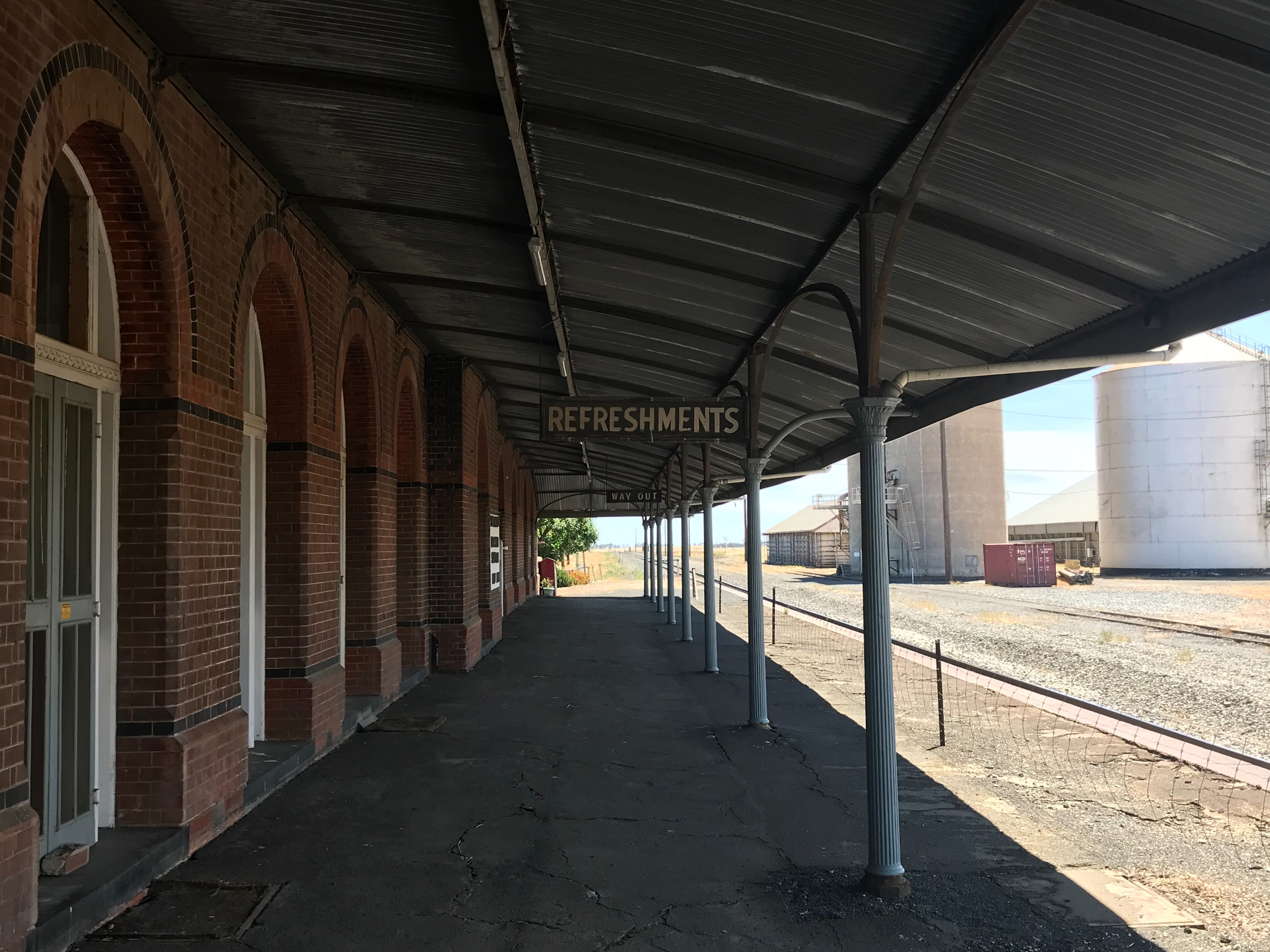

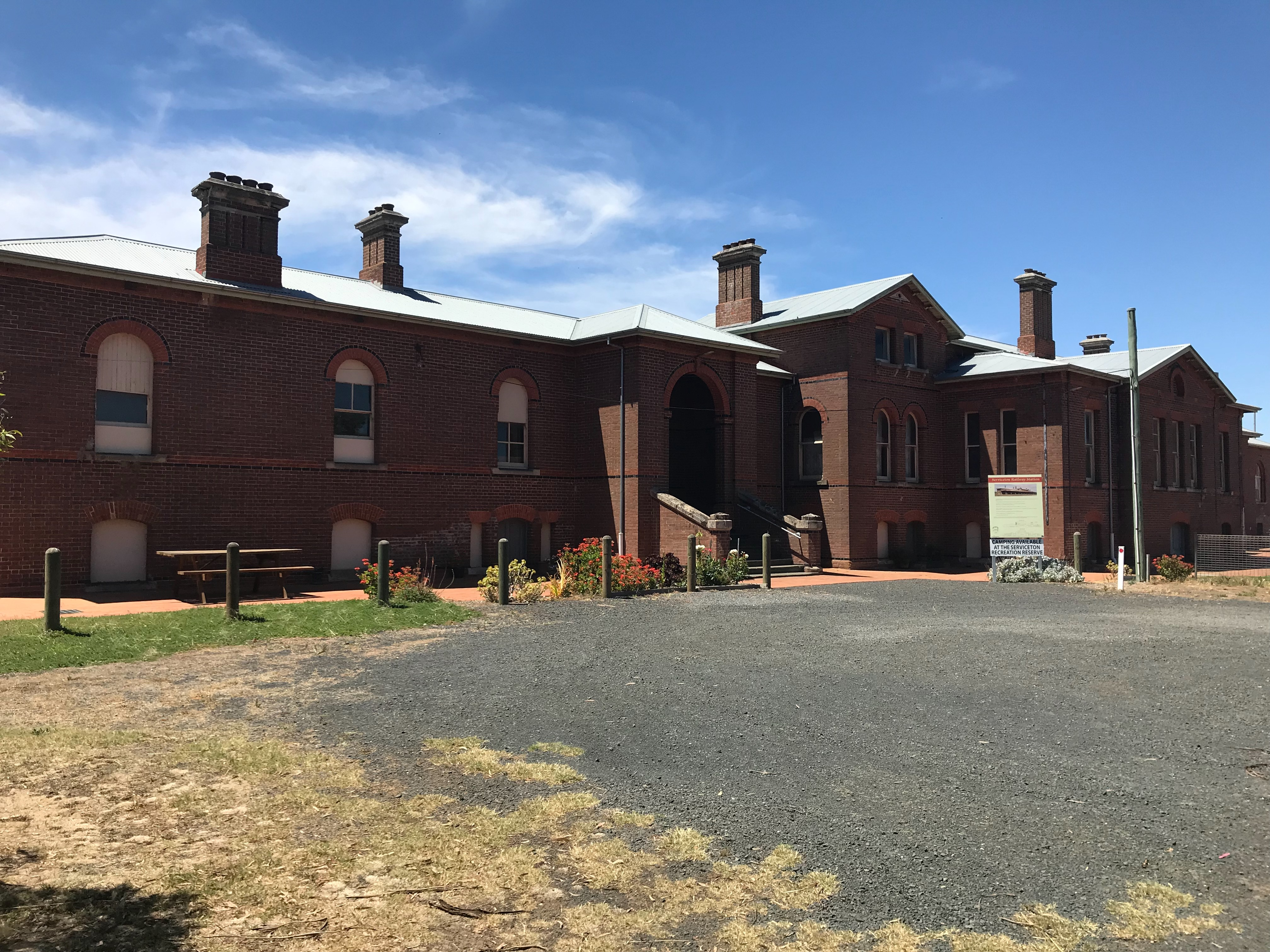

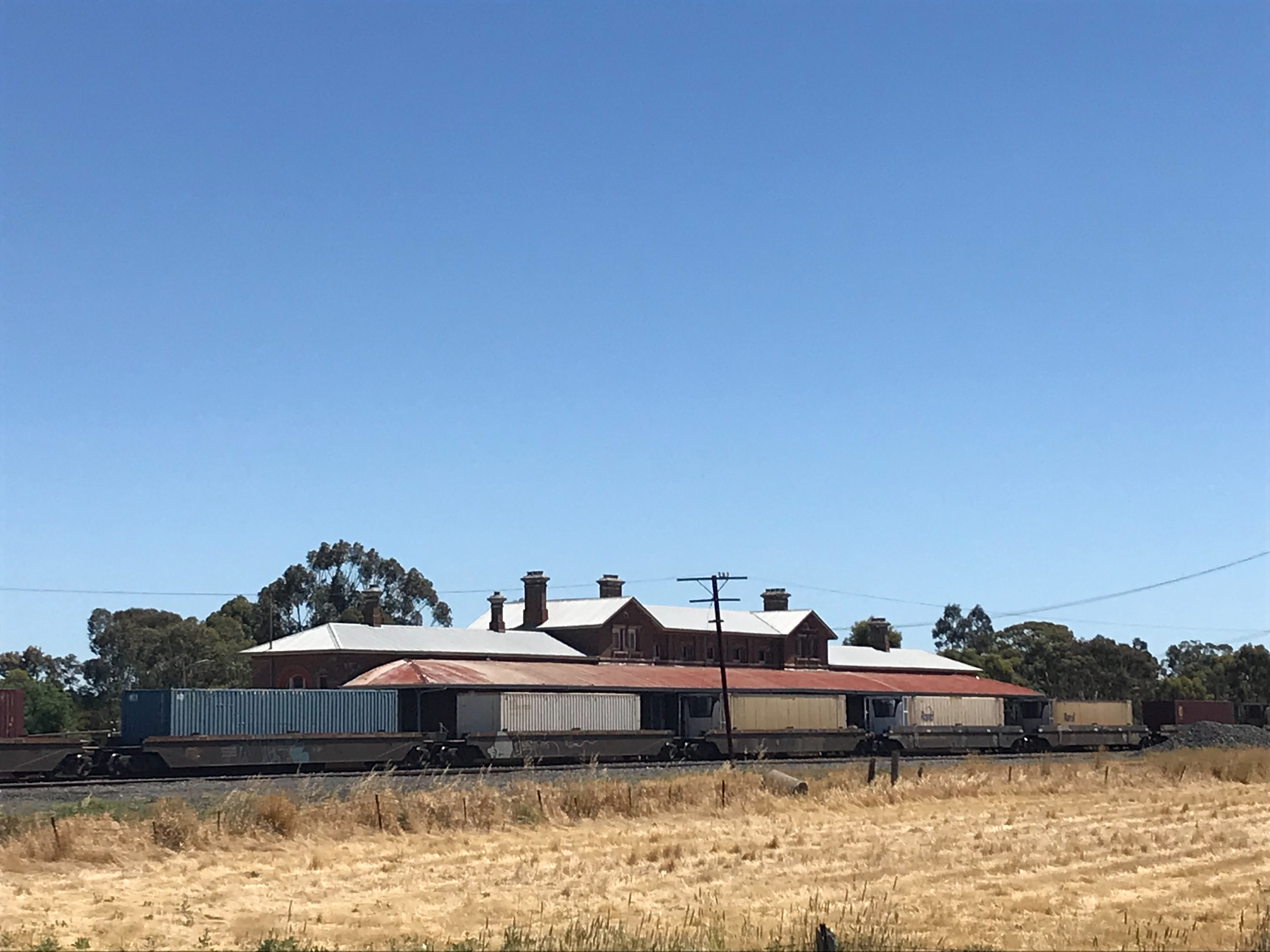

The platform, which is now fenced

Station building from Elizabeth Street

Container well cars, typical of present-day rail freight through Serviceton
