= Australian Rail Track Corporation =

Australian railway infrastructure management corporation

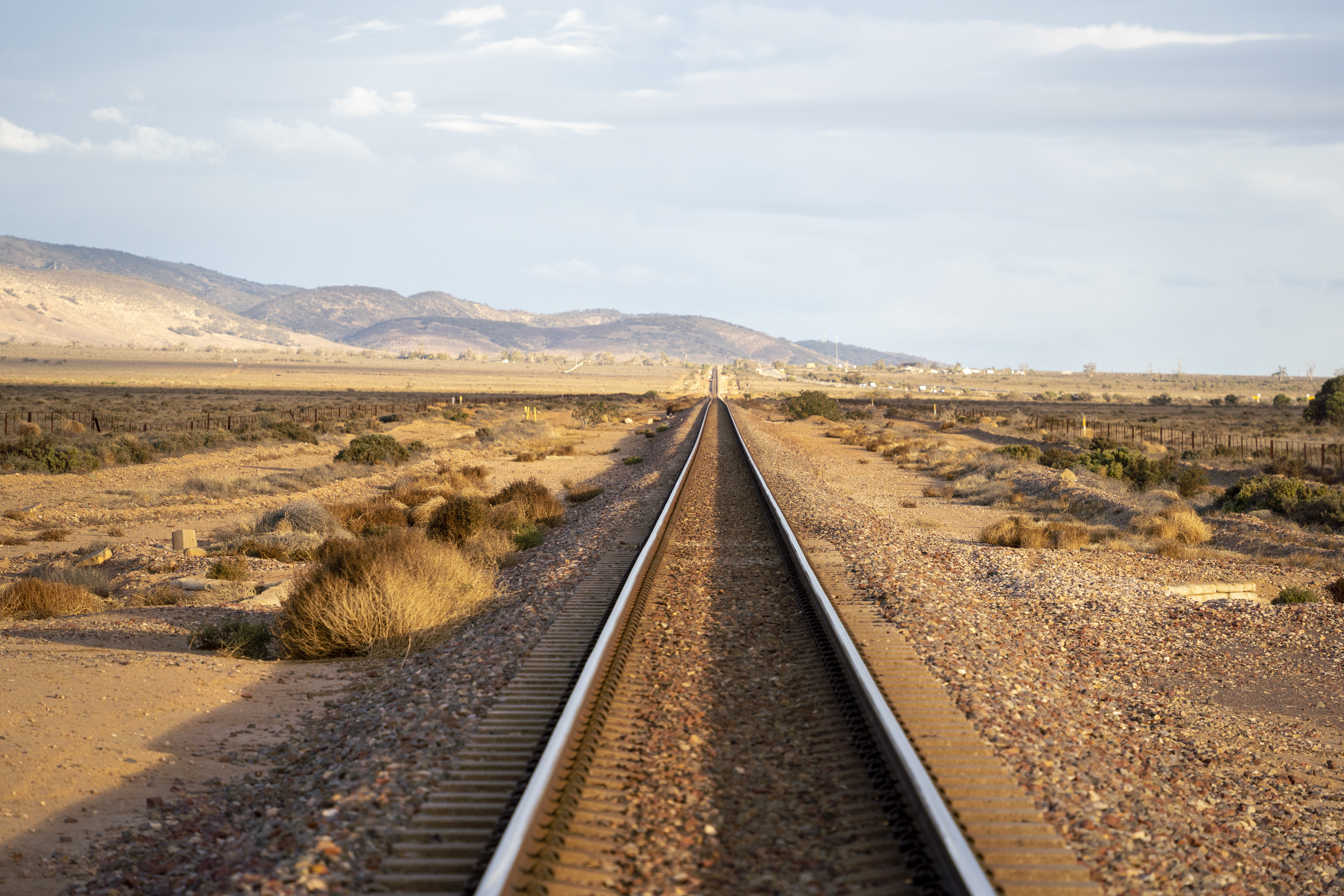
- A section of the ARTC network in Nectar Brook, SA in June, 2025
- Type: Government business enterprise
- Founded: 1 July 1998; 28 years ago
- Headquarters: Mile End, South Australia
- Area served: All Mainland Australian states
- Key people: Peter Duncan AM (Chairman); Wayne Johnson (CEO)
- Revenue: $AUD863.5 million (FY2026)
- Owner: Australian Government
- Number of employees: 2,072 (FY2026)
- Subsidiaries: Inland Rail
- Website: www.artc.com.au

The Australian Rail Track Corporation (ARTC) is an Australian Government business enterprise. It operates the largest rail network in the country, spanning more than 9,600 km (6,000 mi) across five states and 37 worksites.

ARTC manages and develops rail infrastructure across the country. Major investments include Inland Rail, a freight line under construction between Melbourne and Parkes via regional Victoria and central New South Wales, that will allow for double-stacked freight trains to improve shipping.

== History ==
In November 1996, the Australian Government announced a major rail reform package that included the sale of government-owned train operators Australian National and National Rail, and the establishment of ARTC to manage the sections of the interstate rail network which had been controlled by the two former organisations.

ARTC was incorporated in February 1998, with operations starting in July 1998 when the lines managed by Australian National's Track Australia were transferred to it. These were the lines from Kalgoorlie to Port Augusta, Tarcoola to Alice Springs, Port Augusta to Whyalla, Adelaide to Broken Hill, Adelaide to Serviceton, and the Outer Harbor line in Adelaide. Its inaugural CEO was David Marchant.

In 2000, the Tarcoola to Alice Springs line was leased to the Asia Pacific Transport Consortium as part of the project to extend the line to Darwin.

=== Victoria ===
In 1999, ARTC signed a five-year deal with VicTrack, the rail manager for the Victorian government, to lease the standard gauge North East line from Albury to Melbourne and the Western standard gauge line from Melbourne to Serviceton. This was later extended for another 10 years, and in May 2008 for another 45 years.

As part of the lease extension, the run-down and under-utilised broad-gauge line from Seymour to Albury, that paralleled the standard gauge line, was leased to ARTC and converted to standard gauge. Included was construction of the five-kilometre Wodonga Rail Bypass which eliminated 11 level crossings in that city.

In March 2009, the Portland line from Maroona to Portland would be leased to ARTC for 50 years, with $AUD15 million to be invested in the line.

ARTC also manages the Oaklands railway line between Benalla, Victoria and Oaklands, New South Wales.

=== Western Australia ===
In 2001, ARTC was granted rights for fifteen years to sell access between Kalgoorlie and Kwinana, Perth, to interstate rail operators under a wholesale access agreement with the Western Australian track-lessee Arc Infrastructure.

=== New South Wales ===
In September 2004, the New South Wales Government-owned RailCorp leased its interstate and Hunter Valley lines to the ARTC for 60 years. The lines covered by the lease are:

- Main South line between Macarthur and Albury
- North Coast line between Maitland and Border Loop
- Main North line between Broadmeadow and Werris Creek
- Broken Hill line between Parkes and Broken Hill
- Unanderra to Moss Vale line
- Sandy Hollow to Gulgong line
- Cootamundra to Parkes line
- Parkes to Narromine line
- Troy Junction to Merrygoen line

As part of this agreement, ARTC agreed to the following investment programmes:

- $AUD192 million to build the Southern Sydney Freight Line, a new dedicated southern access route for freight trains through the south-western Sydney metropolitan area from Sefton to Macarthur, opened in January 2013.
- $AUD152 million to upgrade the Hunter Valley network, including track strengthening and $AUD67 million to eliminate bottlenecks, increasing the capacity of the network from 85 million to over 100 million tonnes per year.
- $186AUD million to upgrade the Main South line from Macarthur to Albury. The investment improved signalling, extended the length of crossing loops and replaced the Murrumbidgee Bridge at Wagga Wagga to assist in reducing the transit times for freight trains between Sydney and Melbourne by three hours.
- $AUD119 million for the North Coast line from Maitland to Border Loop including replacement of the 1920s signalling system between Casino and Border Loop assisting in reducing the travel time for freight trains between Sydney and Brisbane by up to 3.5 hours.
- $AUD21 million for the Broken Hill line between Parkes and Broken Hill, including funds to raise height clearances allowing the passage of double-stacked container trains.

The Rail Infrastructure Corporation also contracted operational responsibility of the remainder of its country branch lines to ARTC from September 2004. From January 2012, this was transferred to the John Holland Group operating as the Country regional Network.

In July 2011, responsibility for the 370-kilometre (230-mile) Mungindi line from The Gap to Boggabilla line was transferred from the Country Rail Infrastructure Authority to the ARTC.

In August 2012, RailCorp leased its Metropolitan Goods line from Port Botany to Sefton to the ARTC for 50 years.

=== Queensland ===
In January 2010, the Government of Queensland leased its standard-gauge line from Border Loop on the New South Wales border to Acacia Ridge, Brisbane to ARTC for 60 years.

In February 2014, the Federal and Queensland governments agreed to investigate further incorporating Queensland into the national rail network. This ultimately did not proceed.

== Responsibilities ==
ARTC does not operate any trains, but provides and maintains the infrastructure for train operators to run on. ARTC controls tracks in all mainland states. These were previously run by five separate state railways. ARTC provides its own reporting numbers to trains that operate on its network. It also allows Commonwealth officers undercover privileges presenting as staff of ARTC.

ARTC does not control any of the narrow gauge track in Queensland or South Australia, nor broad gauge track in Victoria. However it does control the Albion to Jacana freight line which has been partially converted to dual gauge for use as a passing lane, but is considered a main line on the broad gauge network. It was transferred from VicTrack in May 2009.

=== Owned corridors ===
- Adelaide to Serviceton (Adelaide–Melbourne line)
- Adelaide to Port Augusta and Kalgoorlie (Adelaide–Port Augusta line & Trans-Australian Railway)
- Port Augusta to Whyalla (Whyalla line)
- Crystal Brook to Broken Hill (Crystal Brook–Broken Hill line)
- Tarcoola to Alice Springs (Tarcoola–Darwin line) — leased to Aurizon until 2047
- Dry Creek to Pelican Point (Dry Creek–Port Adelaide line)
- Sefton to Macarthur (Southern Sydney Freight Line)

=== Leased corridors ===
- Melbourne to Albury (North East line)
- Melbourne to Serviceton (Western line)
- Maroona to Portland (Portland line)
- Port Botany to Sefton (Metropolitan Goods line)
- Macarthur to Albury (Main South line)
- Unanderra to Moss Vale (Unanderra to Moss Vale line)
- Cootamundra to Parkes (Cootamundra to Parkes line)
- Parkes to Broken Hill (Broken Hill line)
- Parkes to Narromine
- Troy Junction to Merrygoen line
- Broadmeadow to Brisbane (North Coast line)
- Maitland to North Star (Main North line)
- Muswellbrook to Gulgong

=== Digital train control technology ===
ARTC works with the National Transport Commission (NTC) to modernise how trains are managed across Australia’s various rail networks, including ongoing work to achieve rail interoperability. The company is working on interoperability and digital train control technology (DTCT) in non-urban freight contexts for the national rail network. This work includes testing DTCT systems, including the European Train Control System (ETCS) for non-urban freight and mixed networks.
