= Bowmans railway station =

Former railway station in South Australia, Australia

Bowmans

General information
- Location: Balaklava Road, Bowmans, South Australia
- Coordinates: 34.1597°S 138.2618°E
- Operator: Australian National
- Line: Balaklava-Moonta line
- Distance: 112 kilometres from Adelaide
- Platforms: 1
- Tracks: 1

Construction
- Structure type: Ground

Other information
- Status: Closed, mostly demolished

History
- Opened: 1870
- Closed: 1984

Services
Preceding station	Australian Rail Track Corporation	Following station
Kallora towards Adelaide	Adelaide–Port Augusta railway line	Goyder towards Port Augusta
Preceding station	Australian National Railways Commission	Following station
Saints towards Balaklava	Balaklava-Moonta railway line	Port Wakefield towards Moonta
Location

Bowmans railway station was located at the junction of the Balaklava-Moonta railway line and the Adelaide-Port Augusta railway line in the town of Bowmans, South Australia.

== History ==
An isolated horse-drawn and gravity operated tramway was built to deliver grain from the plains east of Port Wakefield in the areas of Balaklava, Halbury and Hoyle's Plains (now Hoyleton) to that port. The line was converted into a steam railway and extended to Kadina and Wallaroo in 1878. Bowmans railway station was opened in 1870. It was named after E. and C. Bowman who were well known pastoralists and led the estate along which the railway passed. It became a junction with the opening of a new railway line from Salisbury to Snowtown and Redhill. That line was later extended from there to Port Pirie in 1936. Facilities at the station included a timber clad station building, crossing loop, watering facilities and refreshment rooms with a triangle at the Balaklava end of the station yard.

The Port Pirie line was constructed as 5 ft 3 in (1,600 mm) broad gauge and the Moonta line was constructed as 3 ft 6 in (1,067 mm) narrow gauge. This problem was solved when the Moonta line was converted to broad gauge on 1 August 1927.

=== Transfer to Australian National, closure and demolition ===
In 1978, the station and all associated infrastructure was included in the transfer of South Australian Railways to Australian National. The Port Pirie line was converted from 5 ft 3 in (1,600 mm) broad gauge to standard gauge in 1982 and Bowmans gradually lost its importance. The last passenger trains to stop at the station were passenger trains from Adelaide to Port Pirie which ceased in the early 1980s. The broad gauge line through Bowmans closed on 4 April 1984 . The line was later removed and a lot of the station's infrastructure and lands were sold off by the state government.

=== Present day ===
The disused railway platform is the only evidence of the station remaining as of now. The alignment of the southern entrance to the station was converted into a spur to service the Bowmans Rail intermodal terminal.
