= Bute railway station =

Former railway station in South Australia, Australia

Bute

General information
- Location: Railway Terrace, Bute, South Australia
- Coordinates: 33.86573603204749°S 138.00792532827327°E
- Operator: South Australian Railways
- Line: Kadina-Brinkworth line
- Distance: 143 kilometres from Adelaide
- Platforms: 1
- Tracks: 2

Construction
- Structure type: Ground

Other information
- Status: Closed

History
- Opened: 1883
- Closed: 1968 (passengers); May 1979 (freight); 2009 (tourist)

Services
Preceding station	Australian National Railways Commission	Following station
Barunga Gap towards Brinkworth	Kadina-Brinkworth railway line	Willamulka towards Kadina
Location

Bute railway station was located on the Kadina-Brinkworth railway line. It served the town of Bute, South Australia.

== History ==
=== Construction and opening ===
Bute railway station opened in 1883, originally established as a railway siding on the Kadina to Snowtown railway line which opened on 1 October 1879. It was originally called the '18 mile siding' (the distance from Kadina). As there was no local water to meet with the needs of steam engines coming over the hills from Snowtown and up the rise to the siding, an overhead storage tank was constructed and was filled with water which was transported by rail from Balaklava. The railway line's purposes were to transport supplies to new settlements which were further east and to take wood for the furnaces and steam driven pumps at the copper mines at Moonta and the smelters and mines at Wallaroo.

=== Gauge conversion and upgrades ===
A new railway station was built at Bute in the early 1900s consisting of a station building and an unloading platform. On 1 August 1927, the line was gauge converted to broad gauge.

=== Closure to regular traffic ===
The station closed to regular passenger use in 1968. Ownership of the station and the railway line was transferred to Australian National in 1978. With construction of better roads and increasing road transport, the station closed to remaining freight traffic in May 1979. The line from Wallaroo to Snowtown was converted to dual gauge on 2 December 1982 with an extra 1,435 mm (4 ft 8+1/2 in) rail laid following the conversion of the Adelaide-Port Augusta railway line. Some quarry trains to a small quarry near Bute used the line until the early 1990s with the it closing entirely on 3 March 1993.

=== Lions Club of Yorke Peninsula Rail ===
The Yorke Peninsula Rail Preservation Society was formed in 1992 to preserve and run a tourist railway on the line between Kadina and Wallaroo. On 12 April 1994, the YP Rail Preservation Society ran its first train between Wallaroo and Kadina. From 27 December 2000, they extended operations further 38 kilometres to the town of Bute and built a new platform there because the only platform that remained there was the goods platform. The railway ceased operations in 2009 due to high track repair costs.

=== Present day ===
The rail yards and most of the station infrastructure still remain but are now disused. In April 2022, a silo art was painted at the grain silos which are now served by road.
