= Snowtown railway station =

Former railway station in South Australia, Australia

Snowtown

General information
- Location: Railway Terrace, Snowtown, South Australia
- Coordinates: 33.78320125405438°S 138.21259895737916°E
- Operator: Australian National
- Line: Adelaide-Port Augusta line
- Distance: 149 kilometres from Adelaide
- Platforms: 1
- Tracks: 1

Construction
- Structure type: Ground

Other information
- Status: Closed

History
- Opened: 1 October 1879

Services
Preceding station	Australian Rail Track Corporation	Following station
Bumbunga towards Adelaide	Adelaide–Port Augusta railway line	Burnsfield towards Port Augusta
Preceding station	Australian National Railways Commission	Following station
Condowie towards Brinkworth	Kadina-Brinkworth railway line	Barunga Gap towards Kadina
Location

Snowtown railway station was located at the junction of the Adelaide-Port Augusta railway line and the Kadina-Brinkworth railway line in the town of Snowtown, South Australia.

== History ==
Snowtown railway station opened on 1 October 1879 with the opening of the narrow gauge railway line between Kadina and Snowtown, branching off from the Balaklava-Moonta line. It was extended to Brinkworth on 2 July 1894 where it joined the Hamley Bridge-Gladstone line. The broad gauge railway line from Long Plains reached it in 1923. The line was later extended to Port Pirie in 1937. The Kadina-Brinkworth line was gauge converted to broad gauge on 1 August 1927. In 1982, the Adelaide-Port Augusta line was gauge converted to standard gauge along with the Kadina-Brinkworth line to dual gauge.

The Brinkworth line was reduced to Snowtown with the entire line closing on 3 March 1993. Journey Beyond rail's Indian Pacific and The Ghan pass through Snowtown but do not stop there.
