= Port Wakefield railway station =

Station in South Australia, 1869 to 1969

Port Wakefield

General information
- Location: John Street, Port Wakefield, South Australia
- Coordinates: 34°10′59″S 138°09′04″E
- Owner: South Australian Railways 1869 - 1978 Australian National 1978 - 1984
- Operator: South Australian Railways 1869 - 1969
- Line: Balaklava-Moonta line
- Distance: 99 kilometres from Adelaide
- Platforms: 2
- Tracks: 2

Construction
- Structure type: Ground

Other information
- Status: Closed

History
- Opened: 1869
- Closed: 1968

Services
Preceding station	Australian National Railways Commission	Following station
Bowmans towards Balaklava	Balaklava-Moonta railway line	South Hummocks towards Moonta
Location

Port Wakefield railway station was located on the Balaklava-Moonta railway line. It served the town of Port Wakefield.

== History ==
=== Opening ===
Port Wakefield railway station opened on 21 August 1869 when an isolated horse-drawn tramway was built to deliver grain from the plains east of Port Wakefield in the areas of Balaklava, Halbury and Hoyle's Plains (now Hoyleton). The line was converted into a steam railway and extended to Kadina and Wallaroo in 1878. The original station building was built the same year. The station consisted of refreshment rooms, goods crane, platforms for loading passengers and freight and worker cottages. The original station building was burnt down in 1926 and replaced by a wooden building. The station was named after the River Wakefield which was discovered in 1938.

=== Closure and demolition ===
The station closed to regular passenger use in 1968. In 1978, the station and all associated infrastructure was included in the transfer of South Australian Railways to Australian National. The line through Port Wakefield closed on 4 April 1984 and removed not long after.

=== Present day ===
Only the original refreshment rooms, workers cottages, and the dilapidated and fenced off station remain today. The goods crane from the site was removed due to a land sale in the area. The station building is now a private residence.
