= Bowmans, South Australia =

Bowmans South Australia
- Coordinates: 34°09′S 138°15′E
- Population: 56 (SAL 2021)
- Postcode(s): 5550
- Location: 125 km (78 mi) north of Adelaide
- LGA(s): Wakefield Regional Council
- State electorate(s): Narungga
- Federal division(s): Grey
Localities around Bowmans:
Beaufort	Goyder	Whitwarta
Port Wakefield	Bowmans	Saints
	Kallora	Erith

Bowmans (34°09′S 138°15′E; postcode: 5550) is a locality in South Australia's Mid North. At the 2006 census, Bowmans had a population of 203. It is named after R and C Bowman who were "pastoralists in area."

== Traditional occupants ==
According to the Manning Index of South Australian History the "Nantuwwara [sic] tribe of some 25 to 30 once occupied the country from the River Wakefield, north to Whitwarta and west to Hummock Range", an area which would encompass the modern localities of Bowmans, Whitwarta, Goyder, Beaufort, Nantawarra and Mount Templeton. The term Nantuwara (or Nantuwaru) is considered to be a specific name for the northern hordes of the Kaurna people. Stone implements thought to have been used by the Nantuwara people were discovered at sites adjoining the banks of the lower reaches of the River Wakefield and added to a South Australian Museum collection curated by Harold Cooper in the 1960s.

== Transport and industry ==
Bowmans is passed by the Adelaide-Port Augusta railway line and Port Wakefield-Auburn Road (route B84). There is a railway spur servicing Balco Australia hay processing and sidings servicing grain receival bunkers operated by Viterra. The main industries in the area are cereal, hay and sheep farming.

This road was one of the early country roads in South Australia, as the Great Western Road for delivering copper from the mines at Burra to the port at Port Wakefield. It was used for this purpose from 1848 until 1857 when a railway from Gawler to Port Adelaide provided a more attractive transport option.

From 1870, Bowmans was a station on the Port Wakefield-Hoyles Plains tramway which ran inland from the port along a similar alignment to the road. This was built to 3 ft 6 in (1,067 mm) narrow gauge and initially used horses instead of steam locomotives. It was later converted to a railway and extended to Kadina in 1862 and Wallaroo and Moonta in 1866. The Hoyleton to Balaklava section became a part of the Hamley Bridge-Gladstone railway line in 1894 when that line reached Gladstone.

In 1923, the railway from Adelaide north towards Port Pirie was built as 5 ft 3 in (1,600 mm) broad gauge and crossed the Port Wakefield line at Bowmans. Both lines passed through the station but there was little infrastructure provided for transhipping goods or passengers. The break of gauge was solved in 1927 when the Western System, including the Port Wakefield railway, was converted to broad gauge as well.

The Balaklava-Moonta railway line was closed and removed in the late 1980s. The Adelaide-Port Augusta railway line has been converted to 1,435 mm (4 ft 8 1/2 in) standard gauge and rerouted to bypass the station and township. The alignment of the southern entrance to the station is now the spur to service the Bowmans Rail intermodal terminal.

== See also ==
- List of cities and towns in South Australia
