= Goyder, South Australia =

Goyder South Australia
- Coordinates: 34.0819°S 138.2741°E
- Population: 24 (SAL 2021)
- Postcode(s): 5461
- Location: 107 km (66 mi) N of Adelaide
- LGA(s): Wakefield Regional Council
- Region: Mid North
- State electorate(s): Narungga
- Federal division(s): Grey
Localities around Goyder:
Nantawarra	Nantawarra; Mount Templeton	Mount Templeton
Beaufort	Goyder	Whitwarta
Port Wakefield	Bowmans, Whitwarta	Saints
- Footnotes: Adjoining localities

Goyder (33°58′S 138°19′E; postcode: 5461) is a locality in South Australia's Mid North situated in the central east of the cadastral Hundred of Goyder. It was named for the hundred (proclaimed 1862) which was in turn named for George Goyder, Surveyor General of South Australia at the time.

The locality is bounded on the west by the Adelaide-Port Augusta railway line. The Black Range stretches north–south through the locality from the foot of Mount Templeton outside the northern boundary of the locality. Similarly, the Bismark Valley (thought to be named in jest by early settler families of German origin for Otto von Bismarck) runs north to south through the centre of the locality.

== Traditional occupants ==
According to the Manning Index of South Australian History the "Nantuwwara [sic] tribe of some 25 to 30 once occupied the country from the River Wakefield, north to Whitwarta and west to Hummock Range", an area which would encompass the modern localities of Bowmans, Whitwarta, Goyder, Beaufort, Nantawarra and Mount Templeton. The term Nantuwara (or Nantuwaru) is considered to be a specific name for the northern hordes of the Kaurna people. Stone implements thought to have been used by the Nantuwara people were discovered at sites adjoining the banks of the lower reaches of the River Wakefield and added to a South Australian Museum collection curated by Harold Cooper in the 1960s.

== See also ==
- List of cities and towns in South Australia
