= Whyalla railway line =

Railway line between Port Augusta and Whyalla

Overview
- Termini: Port Augusta; Whyalla
- Continues from: Adelaide-Port Augusta line
- Stations: Spencer Junction; Lincoln Gap (Block Point); Roopena; Whyalla

History
- Opened: 6 October 1972

Technical
- Line length: 74 km (46 mi)
- Track gauge: 1,435 mm (4 ft 8 1/2 in)

The Whyalla railway line runs from Port Augusta to Whyalla.

== History ==
The Whyalla line was built primarily to serve the BHP's Whyalla Steelworks. The line was built by the Commonwealth Railways as a standard gauge line being opened on 6 October 1972 by Prime Minister William McMahon.

Current operations along the line include regular Steel and rail maintenance trains operated by Pacific National, along with Iron Ore and Ballast trains operated by Aurizon.

== Passenger Services ==
When it opened, the line was served by a daily passenger service from Adelaide to Whyalla operated by CB class railcars. The service was withdrawn in 1975.

On 21 April 1986, the service was reintroduced as the Iron Triangle Limited. It was withdrawn on 31 December 1990 when Australian National withdrew all its South Australian passenger services.
