= Iron Triangle Limited =

Former South Australian passenger train

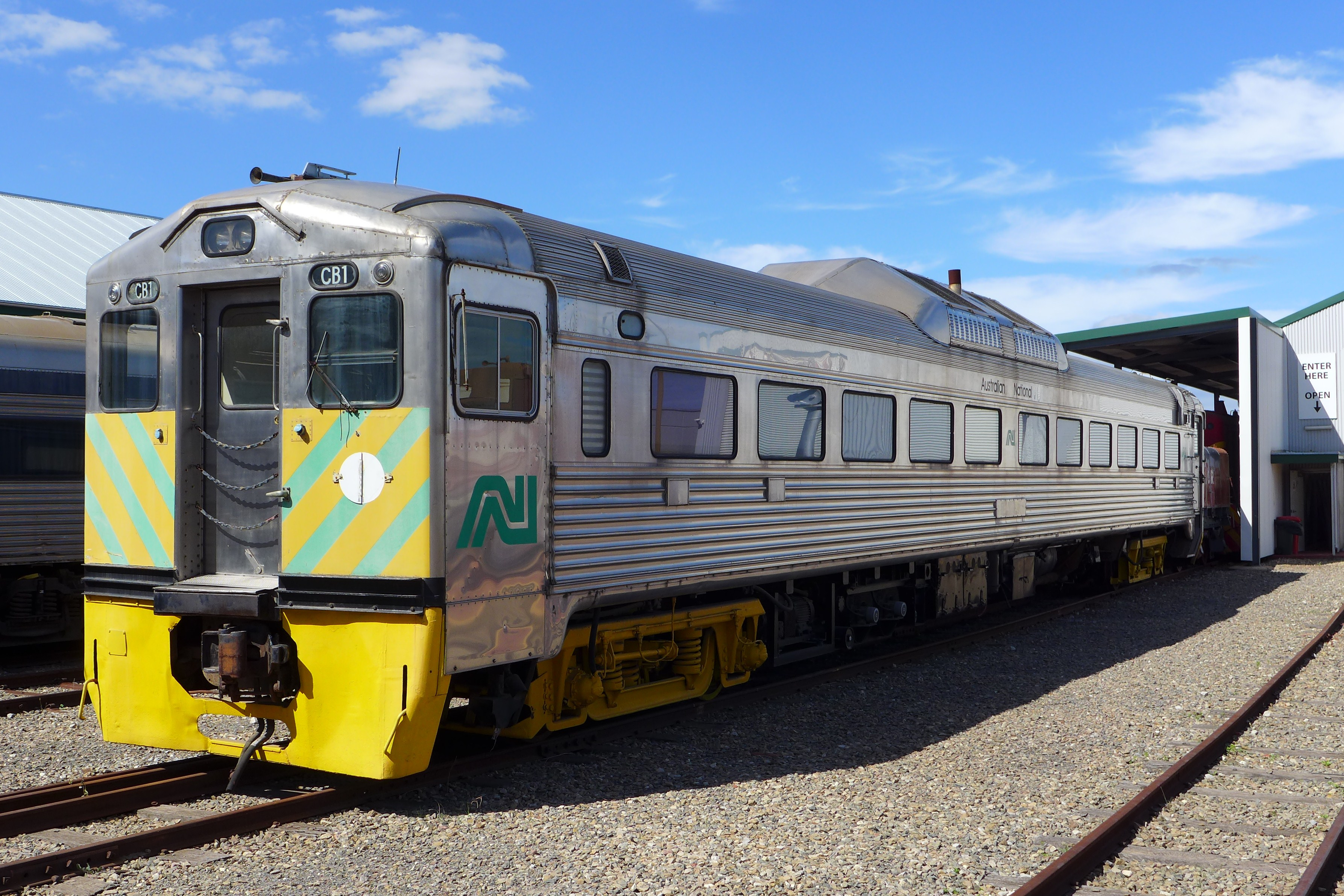
- Preserved CB1 at the National Railway Museum, Port Adelaide in April 2014

Overview
- Service type: Passenger train
- Status: Ceased
- First service: 21 April 1986
- Last service: 31 December 1990
- Former operator(s): Australian National

Route
- Termini: Adelaide; Whyalla
- Stops: Port Pirie, Port Augusta
- Line(s) used: Adelaide-Port Augusta; Whyalla

Technical
- Rolling stock: CB class railcar

The Iron Triangle Limited was a passenger train operated by Australian National between Adelaide, Port Pirie, Port Augusta, and Whyalla.

== History ==
The Iron Triangle Limited first operated on 21 April 1986. It ceased operating on 31 December 1990 when all regional passenger services were withdrawn in South Australia.

== Rolling stock ==
The train was formed of CB class railcars. It was operated on occasions by Bluebird railcars.
