= Paskeville railway station =

Former railway station in South Australia, Australia

Paskeville

General information
- Location: Railway Terrace, Paskeville, South Australia
- Operator: Australian National
- Line: Balaklava-Moonta line
- Platforms: 1
- Tracks: 1

Construction
- Structure type: Ground

Other information
- Status: Demolished

History
- Opened: 1878
- Closed: 1968

Services
Preceding station	Australian National Railways Commission	Following station
Melton towards Balaklava	Balaklava-Moonta railway line	Kadina towards Moonta
Location

Paskeville railway station was located on the Balaklava-Moonta railway line. It served the town of Paskeville, South Australia.

== History ==
=== Opening ===
Paskeville railway station opened in 1878 with the opening of the railway line from Port Wakefield to Kadina. It consisted of a railway yard and a railway siding. It had also had a goods shed but it was burnt down and never rebuilt. A railway line was proposed to run from Paskeville to the town of Maitland but it was never built.

=== Closure and demolition ===
The station closed to regular passenger use in 1968. In 1978, the station and all associated infrastructure was included in the transfer of South Australian Railways to Australian National. The railway line from Balaklava to Paskeville closed on 4 April 1984 but the line from Kadina to Paskeville remained open until 14 March 1990. The railway line and station was completely removed.

=== Present day ===
As of 2024, the goods crane and the station sign are the only evidence of the station remaining.
