= Nantawarra, South Australia =

Nantawarra South Australia
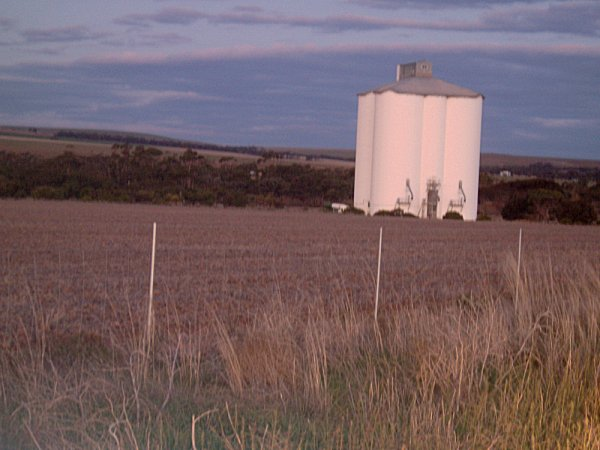
- View of Nantawarra's silos from Highway 1, facing east

- Coordinates: 34°01′23.1″S 138°13′35.6″E
- Population: 67 (SAL 2021)
- Postcode(s): 5550
- Location: 120 km (75 mi) north of Adelaide city centre; 25 km (16 mi) north of Port Wakefield; 12 km (7 mi) south of Snowtown
- LGA(s): Wakefield Regional Council
- State electorate(s): Narungga
- Federal division(s): Grey
Localities around Nantawarra:
Lochiel, Ninnes	Bumbunga	Everard Central
Kulpara	Nantawarra	Mount Templeton
South Hummocks	Beaufort, Bowmans	Goyder, Whitwarta

Nantawarra is a locality in South Australia located about 120 kilometres (75 miles) north of the Adelaide city centre and within the local government area known as the Wakefield Regional Council. The locality occupies land on both sides of Highway 1 between Port Wakefield in the south and Snowtown in the north. Nantawarra is recognisable from a distance by the presence of the disused grain silos immediately just east of the Adelaide-Port Augusta railway line. The name Nantawarra may derive from the word nantuwara (meaning a northern yerta, or family group) in Kaurna, the language of the indigenous people of this part of South Australia.

In June 2023, the grain silos were planned to be demolished, with uproar from the local community. The silos were demolished in January 2024.

== Traditional occupants ==
According to the Manning Index of South Australian History the "Nantuwwara [sic] tribe of some 25 to 30 once occupied the country from the River Wakefield, north to Whitwarta and west to Hummock Range", an area which would encompass the modern localities of Bowmans, Whitwarta, Goyder, Beaufort, Nantawarra and Mount Templeton. The term Nantuwara (or Nantuwaru) is considered to be a specific name for the northern hordes of the Kaurna people. Stone implements thought to have been used by the Nantuwara people were discovered at sites adjoining the banks of the lower reaches of the River Wakefield and added to a South Australian Museum collection curated by Harold Cooper in the 1960s.

== See also ==
- List of cities and towns in South Australia
- Railway accidents in South Australia
- Yorke Peninsula Field Days
