= Kadina railway station =

Station in South Australia, 1878 to 2009

Kadina

General information
- Location: Frances Terrace, Kadina, South Australia
- Coordinates: 33°57′53″S 137°42′47″E
- Owner: South Australian Railways 1878 - 1978 Australian National 1978 - 1993
- Operator: South Australian Railways 1869 - 1969
- Line: Balaklava-Moonta line
- Distance: 152 kilometres from Adelaide
- Platforms: 2
- Tracks: 2

Construction
- Structure type: Ground

Other information
- Status: Closed

History
- Opened: 9 October 1878
- Closed: 1968

Services
Preceding station	Australian National Railways Commission	Following station
Paskeville towards Balaklava	Balaklava-Moonta railway line	Wallaroo towards Moonta
Bute towards Brinkworth	Kadina-Brinkworth railway line	Terminus
Location

Kadina railway station was located on the junction of the Balaklava-Moonta railway line and the Kadina-Brinkworth railway line. It served the town of Kadina.

== History ==
Kadina railway station opened on 9 October 1878 when the 3 ft 6 in (1,067 mm) narrow gauge line from Port Wakefield was constructed. It continued to Wallaroo on a new track adjacent to the older broad gauge track. The line from Kadina to Barunga Gap (later extended to Brinkworth on 2 July 1894) had started construction from the Kadina end in 1877. The line officially opened on 1 October 1879.

The station consisted of a goods shed, water tower, goods crane, a loading ramp, a ganger's shed, railway yards, two railway cottages and a station building.

On 1 August 1927, the lines were gauge converted to broad gauge.

The station closed to regular passenger use in 1968. In 1978, the station and all associated infrastructure was included in the transfer of South Australian Railways to Australian National. The section from Wallaroo to Snowtown was converted to dual gauge on 2 December 1982 with an extra 1,435 mm (4 ft 8+1/2 in) rail laid following the conversion of the Adelaide-Port Augusta railway line.

The line to Port Wakefield closed on 14 March 1990 but the line towards Snowtown remained open until 3 March 1993. After closure, part of the line from Wallaroo to Bute was used by the Lions Club of Yorke Peninsula for heritage tourist train services but this ceased in 2009 due to high track repair costs.

The line from Wallaroo to Kadina has since been ripped up and replaced with the Copper Coast Rail Trail and retail stores on both ends.
