= Condowie railway station =

Former railway station in South Australia, Australia

Condowie

General information
- Operator: Australian National
- Line: Kadina-Brinkworth line

Construction
- Structure type: Ground

Other information
- Status: Closed and demolished

History
- Opened: 2 July 1894
- Closed: 1968 (passengers); 20 February 1990 (freight)

Services
Preceding station	Australian National Railways Commission	Following station
Brinkworth Terminus	Kadina-Brinkworth railway line	Snowtown towards Kadina

Condowie railway station was located on the Kadina-Brinkworth railway line in the locality of Condowie, South Australia.

== History ==
Condowie station opened on 2 July 1894 when the railway line was extended from Snowtown to Brinkworth as narrow gauge. The line through Condowie was gauge converted to 5 ft 3 in (1,600 mm) on 1 August 1927. The station closed to regular passengers by 1972. The line through Condowie closed on 20 February 1990; there is no longer any trace of the station.
