= Wallaroo railway station =

Former railway station in South Australia, Australia

Wallaroo
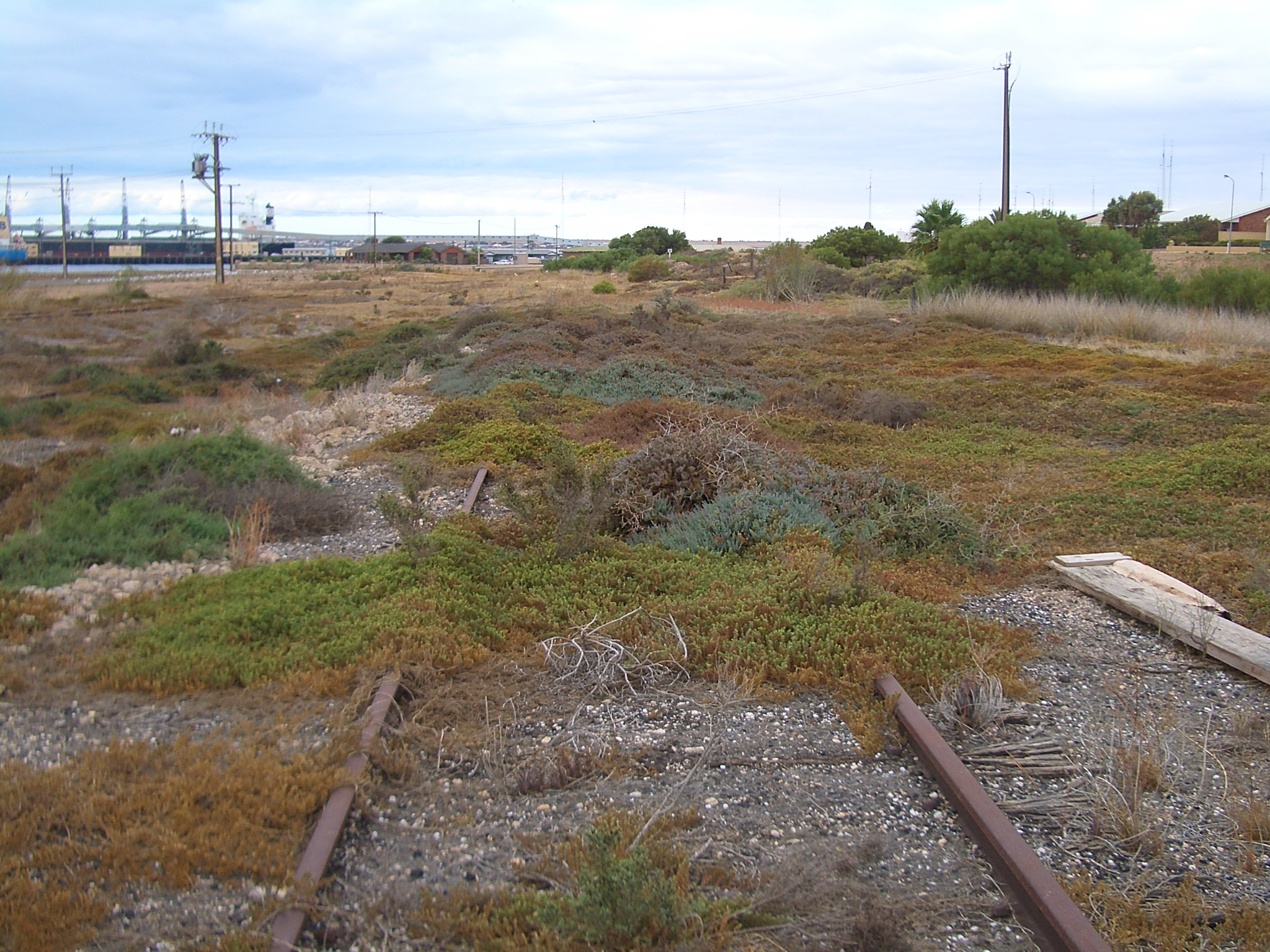
- An overgrown railway track at the former railway yard

General information
- Location: John Terrace, Wallaroo, South Australia
- Coordinates: 33.9318527424249°S 137.62625029322552°E
- Operator: Australian National
- Line: Balaklava-Moonta line
- Distance: 159 kilometres from Adelaide
- Platforms: 1
- Tracks: 1

Construction
- Structure type: Ground

Other information
- Status: Closed

History
- Opened: 1862
- Closed: 1968 (passenger); 2009 (tourist)

Services
Preceding station	Australian National Railways Commission	Following station
Kadina towards Balaklava	Balaklava-Moonta railway line	Moonta Terminus
Location

Wallaroo railway station was located on the Balaklava-Moonta railway line. It served the town of Wallaroo, South Australia.

== History ==
Wallaroo railway station opened in 1862 when a horse-drawn tramway was opened between the port at Wallaroo and mines near Kadina. It was later extended to the mines near Moonta in 1866. This was originally constructed as 5 ft 3 in (1,600 mm) gauge. A railway from Port Wakefield reached and joined with the tramway (converted into a railway). This then became the Balaklava to Moonta railway line. The current railway station was built in 1914 as a replacement for the older station, which was demolished in 1926, to cater for increasing passenger traffic. It was built in the American Art Nouveau style. Identical stations were built at Moonta, Tailem Bend and Bordertown. The station also consisted of a goods shed and railway yards.

Regular passenger services ceased in 1968. In 1978, the station and all associated infrastructure was included in the transfer of South Australian Railways to Australian National. The station was heritage listed on 1 September 1983. The line from Wallaroo to Moonta closed on 23 July 1984. After closure, part of the line from Wallaroo to Bute was used by the Lions Club of Yorke Peninsula for heritage tourist train services but this ceased in 2009. The railway yard was lifted and turned into a parkland. The railway line between Kadina and Wallaroo was ripped up and converted into the Copper Coast Rail Trail. The station building is now housed for community use.
