= Whitwarta, South Australia =

Whitwarta
- Town
- Construction of the Whitwarta Bridge (c. 1914) The bridge was officially opened on 17 August 1914. As reported in the Advertiser, The Commissioner of Crown Lands (Hon. F. W. Young) opened the bridge.

- Coordinates: 34°06′0″S 138°20′0″E
- Country: Australia
- State: South Australia
- LGA: Wakefield Regional Council
- Established: 1870s

Government
  - State electorate: Goyder
  - Federal division: Grey

Population
  - Total: 48 (SAL 2016)
- Postcode: 5461
Localities around Whitwarta
Nantawarra; Lochiel	Mount Templeton	Stow; Bowillia
Goyder; Beaufort	Whitwarta	Watchman; Hoyleton
Bowmans; Port Wakefield	Saints; Kallora	Balaklava

Whitwarta is a town in South Australia. The town is situated beside the Wakefield River (known as Undalya to the Indigenous people) about 100 km north of the state capital, Adelaide. The name Whitwarta means freshwater (distorted from Whitarter), a reference to the freshwater springs that exist along the pronounced bend in the river nearby. The constant availability of freshwater along an otherwise dry river (the Rocks upstream of Balaklava is the next closest and permanent waterhole) meant that Whitwarta was a suitable place to establish a village. Approximately 20 people now live in the village.

Geographically, Whitwarta is situated on the plains, almost halfway between the Clare Valley and Skilly Hills to the East and the Southern Hummocks Ranges to the West. A series of salt lakes pepper the countryside to the West and North East of Whitwarta.

The old Whitwarta School (1879–1951) still stands at the northern end of the village on Bowman St, as does the Post Office at the southern end. The church and Whitwarta Hotel along the Kadina Road were damaged by floods during the 1900s, and were demolished as a consequence. The last flood occurred in September 2010 (the previous flood occurred in summer of 1998). A number of Eucalyptus camaldulensis sprouted on the flood plains and riparian zone shortly afterwards, some of which have been fenced-off by local farmers to avoid stock damage. A management plan for the River Wakefield was carried out in 2000, which included recommendations for the amelioration of water quality and flow at Whitwarta. Up until the late 1970s, it was common for the River Wakefield to flow every winter. Damming of the river upstream has impacted flows to the point that the River Wakefield now flows about once every five years. The trees around Whitwarta have suffered in recent years because of the rise of salinity in the soil. The National Trust of South Australia has listed a stand of Eucalyptus largiflorens (river box) at Whitwarta on the significant tree registrar. These trees, which are located approximately 500 metres (1,600 ft) north of the River Wakefield and about 600 metres (2,000 ft) west of the Halbury-Whitwarta intersection, are the only Eucalypts of their kind in the district. Local farmers say that these trees sprouted after a flood in the early-mid 1900s.

A gliding club and rifle club are both located on the outskirts of Whitwarta.

Whitwarta once had a cricket team and a tennis club.

== Traditional occupants ==
According to the Manning Index of South Australian History the "Nantuwwara [sic] tribe of some 25 to 30 once occupied the country from the River Wakefield, north to Whitwarta and west to Hummock Range", an area which would encompass the modern localities of Bowmans, Whitwarta, Goyder, Beaufort, Nantawarra and Mount Templeton. The term Nantuwara (or Nantuwaru) is considered to be a specific name for the northern hordes of the Kaurna people. Stone implements thought to have been used by the Nantuwara people were discovered at sites adjoining the banks of the lower reaches of the River Wakefield and added to a South Australian Museum collection curated by Harold Cooper in the 1960s.

== Major floods ==
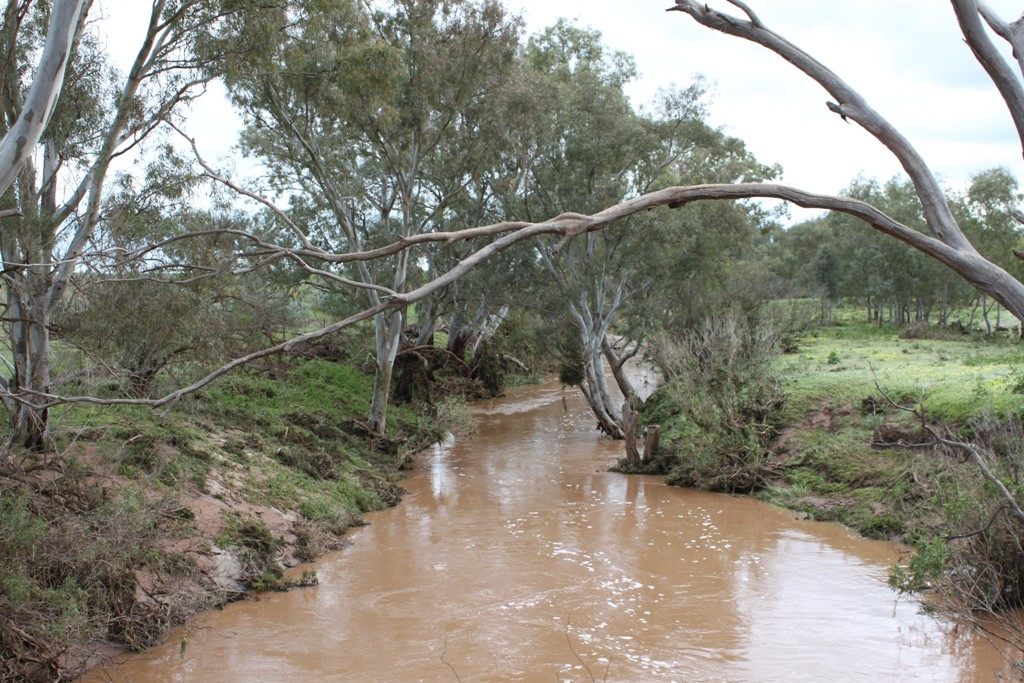
Wakefield River in Flood, Old Whitwarta Bridge, 6 Sept 2010

There are several accounts of major flooding of the Wakefield River at Whitwarta. The major floods recorded at Whitwarta occurred during the following years:

- 2010: Heavy rains throughout the catchment area of the Wakefield River caused major flooding at Whitwarata in early September. As in 1998, the water from the River flowed across the Whitarta to Balaklava Road (at the base of the Billabong Hill). It also flooded paddocks around the Whitwarta township, including the natural lagoon at the base of Whitwarta House. Water flowed across the Whitwarta to Kadina road. No damage to property or stock was recorded.
- 1998: The banks of the Wakefield River overflowed at Werocata and Whitwarta in winter. The water covered the Whitwarta to Balaklava Road and the Whitwarta to Kadina Road. The waters covered farmlands and remained for several months. Further rains in early summer 1998 caused the river to flood again. The old ruins of the Whitwarta Hotel were underwater, as was the depression behind the Whitwarta township. Locals caught European Carp in the waters that remained pooled in this depression. Such was the amount of water in the region, locals observed the appearance of brine shrimp in the waters of nearby salt lakes (especially the lakes near the northern lagoon of Diamond Lake).
- 1937: The Canberra Times on Sept 3, 1937 reported that: "A torrent of water ten chains wide, is sweeping across Whitwarta Road from Werochea [Werocata] station"

== Historic Whitwarta personalities and stories ==
Whitwarta Bridge (c. 1914)

=== Trades and professions ===
In 1881, the follow trades and professions for Whitwarta were recorded in Wright's Australian and American commercial directory and gazetteer.

- Storekeeper: R.T. Wilson
- Hotel: 'Whitwarta' David Pink
- Wheelwright: M. Koefner

=== Teachers at the Whitwarta School ===
Research by the University of South Australia indicates that the following teachers served at the now defunct Whitwarta School from 1879–1947:

Year	Name
1879–1883	Howie, Edith M.
1884	Richardson, Jane
1885	Darby, Louisa Margaret
1885–1886	Tucker, Julia
1887	Armytage, Frances Gertrude
1887	Tucker, Julia
1888	Armytage, Frances Gertrude
1889–1890	Lucy, Mary Theresa
1891	Lowe, Edith Charlotte Lister
1891	Lucy, Mary Theresa
1892	Lowe, Edith Charlotte Lister
1897–1898	Tupper, Sarah Ann
1899	Kippin, Minnie
1899–1903	Tupper, Sarah Ann
1904–1906	Bowden, Blanche May
1906–1907	Clark, Evelyn Maude
1907–1908	Correll, Stella Daisy
1908–1910	McLean, Annie Isabel
1946–1947	Hooper, Maurice Desmond Thomas

=== Whitwarta residents involvement in World War I ===
Soon after World War I, a gathering at the school on Arbor Day, 19 August 1918, saw the unveiling of a roll of honor. It commemorated the ten old scholars who had served in the armed forces, including three who had been killed. These included Driver Eric R. Lange, who died from gunshot wounds in action in France less than two years after he enlisted with the 9th Light Horse Regiment. Another was Private Stanley Roy Angel who enlisted on 10 March 1917 and returned to Australia after the conclusion of the war, on 10 July 1919. He was also with the 9th Light Horse.

=== Pioneer Celebration ===
On 3 December 2001 a number of local residents of Whitwarta gathered in front of Whitwarta House to celebrate the pioneers who shaped the township and the farms around it. A number of descendants of the original pioneers were present. A plaque was unveiled to commemorate the occasion. Esmond Hoepner of Whitwarta gave a plein-air presentation of the history and life of Whitwarta and its people. A capsule was laid in concrete beneath the plaque. It is to be unveiled on 2 December 2101 by the Whitwarta residents of the time.

The plaque reads: This plaque is erected to commemorate the pioneers of this township before 1900. Whitwarta was named before 1850 and surveyed into 69 allotments in 1879. Apart from a number of private dwellings it had:

- Whitwarta Hotel 1886–1923
- Telephone added in 1924
- Wesleyan Church 1888–1920
- Government Wells 1874–1912
- Store and Post Office 1876–1967
- Blacksmith 1878–1903
- School 1879–1965

Names of some of the pioneers who made a valuable contribution in Whitwarta were

- J. J. Angel, farmer
- H. W. Clark, publican
- J. R. F. Hoepner, blacksmith & wheelwright
- J. Hudson, teamster
- E. Router, farmer
- R. T. Wilson, storekeeper & clerk
- C. Belling, farmer*
- W. J. Dunow, caretaker
- R. Hornhardt, storekeeper
- D. Pink, publican
- J. Watson, builder

=== Whitwarta Cemetery ===
The cemetery is 1.5 km (0.93 mi) to the east the township and surrounded by Aleppo pine trees. Two of the people buried were passengers on HMS Buffalo of the First Fleet of South Australia, John William Adams (died in 1893 aged 93) and Susanna Adams (died in 1891 aged 85). The plaque reads that these "Two pioneers of South Australia arrived with the first Governor in H.M.S Buffalo 1836 and was present at the proclamation of the colony, Dec 28, 1836."

=== Whitwarta Bridge ===
A bridge over the Wakefield River was constructed in approximately 1884. However, by 1912, this bridge was decaying due to white ants and dry rot, and too narrow for the traffic using it.

A new bridge was opened on 14 August 1914 by the Commissioner of Crown Lands, F. W. Young, accompanied by the other members of parliament for Wooroora, Oscar Duhst and David James and the chairman of the district council, Mr. F. McArdle.

== Diamond Lake ==
Diamond Lake, about 3 km west of the Whitwarta Village is a distinctive landscape feature of the region. It is an ephemeral salt lake. See location on Google Maps. The first Europeans to discover Diamond Lake, which they described as a 'dry lagoon', were the explorers John Hill and Thomas Burr, when passing through the Whitwarta district on 29 April 1840. A variety of wildfowl can be seen here when the Lake fills after winter rains, such as: Black Swans, Grey Teal, Chestnut Teal, Pacific Black Duck, Water Hens, and Plovers. Gypsum continues to be mined from the banks of the Lake. The Lake fills up from local rainfall-runoff, and fills from the northern lagoon first.
