= Silver City Limited =

Australian railway service, 1986–1990

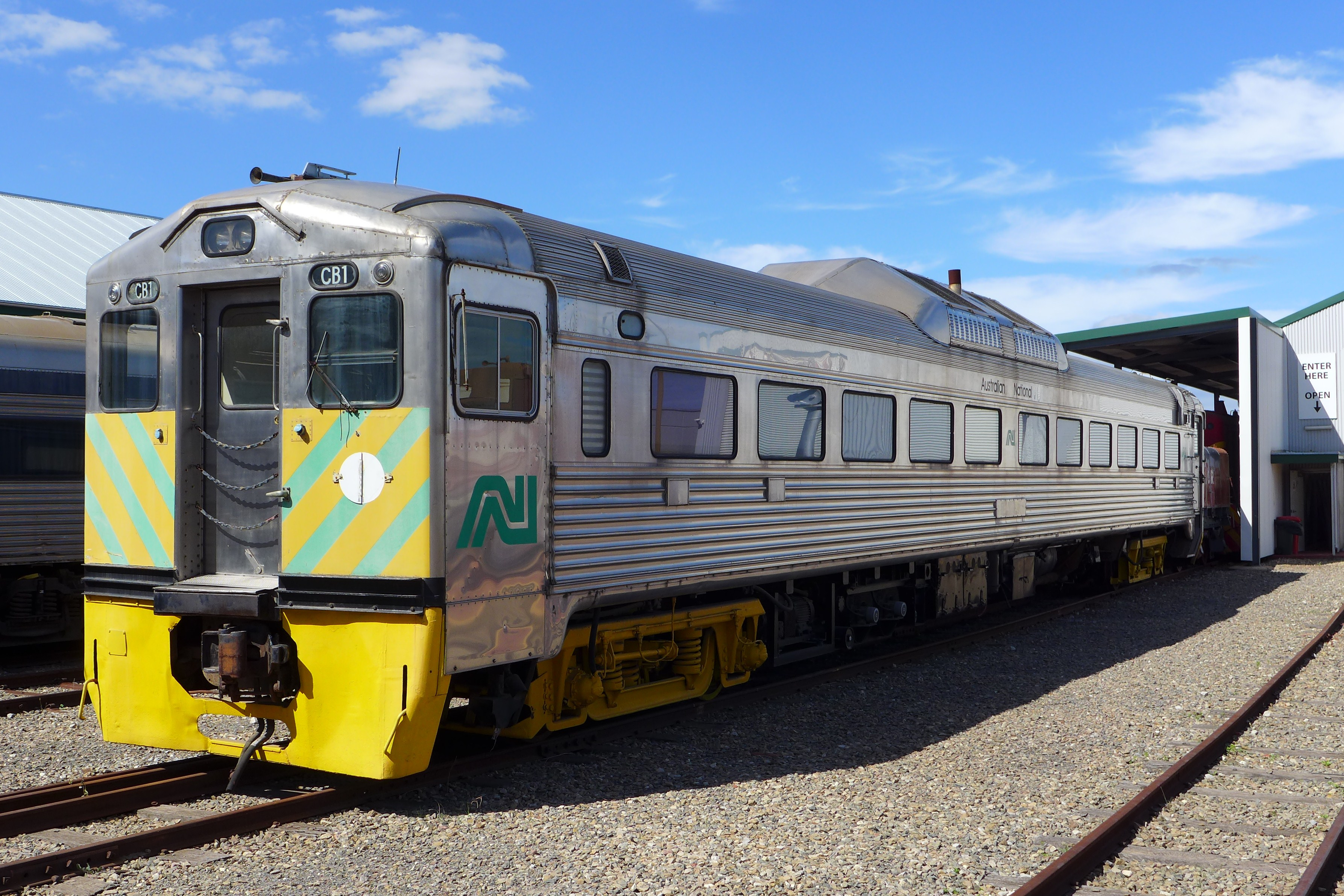
- Preserved CB1 at the National Railway Museum, Port Adelaide in April 2014

Overview
- Service type: Passenger train
- Status: Ceased
- First service: 14 December 1986
- Last service: 31 December 1990
- Former operator(s): Australian National

Route
- Termini: Adelaide; Broken Hill
- Line(s) used: Adelaide-Crystal Brook; Crystal Brook-Broken Hill

Technical
- Rolling stock: CB class railcar

The Silver City Limited was a passenger train operated by Australian National between Adelaide and Broken Hill.

== History ==
The Silver City Limited commenced operating on 14 December 1986 Adelaide and Broken Hill. It ceased operating on 31 December 1990 when all regional passenger services were withdrawn in South Australia.

== Rolling stock ==
The train was formed of CB class railcars. It was operated on occasions by Bluebird railcars.

== External Reading ==
- Passenger trains west of Broken Hill before 1986
- The Silver City Comet power cars
- Why was the Silver city comet important?
