= Beaufort, South Australia =

Beaufort South Australia
- Coordinates: 34.08°S 138.21°E
- Population: 81 (SAL 2021)
- Established: 4 September 1879
- Postcode(s): 5550
- Elevation: 55 m (180 ft)
- Location: 12 km (7 mi) north of Port Wakefield; 110 km (68 mi) north of Adelaide
- LGA(s): Wakefield Regional Council
- State electorate(s): Narungga
- Federal division(s): Grey
Localities around Beaufort:
South Hummocks	Nantawarra
	Beaufort	Goyder
Port Arthur	Port Wakefield	Bowmans

Beaufort is a locality along the Augusta Highway in the Mid North region of South Australia. The town was surveyed in November 1878 and gazetted on 4 September 1879.

== History ==
=== Indigenous ===
According to the Manning Index of South Australian History the "Nantuwwara [sic] tribe of some 25 to 30 once occupied the country from the River Wakefield, north to Whitwarta and west to Hummock Range", an area which would encompass the modern localities of Bowmans, Whitwarta, Goyder, Beaufort, Nantawarra and Mount Templeton. The term Nantuwara (or Nantuwaru) is considered to be a specific name for the northern hordes of the Kaurna people. Stone implements thought to have been used by the Nantuwara people were discovered at sites adjoining the banks of the lower reaches of the River Wakefield and added to a South Australian Museum collection curated by Harold Cooper in the 1960s.

=== 1900s ===
The Beaufort had a school opened in 1917 and had 13 students in 1950 but has since closed.

In 1918 a Methodist Church was constructed in Beaufort. The church was closed and demolished in the early 1950s and rebuilt in 1953 91 miles (146 km) to the south in Clovelly Park, one of Adelaide's new housing suburbs at the time.
