= Yacka railway station =

Former railway station in South Australia, Australia

Yacka
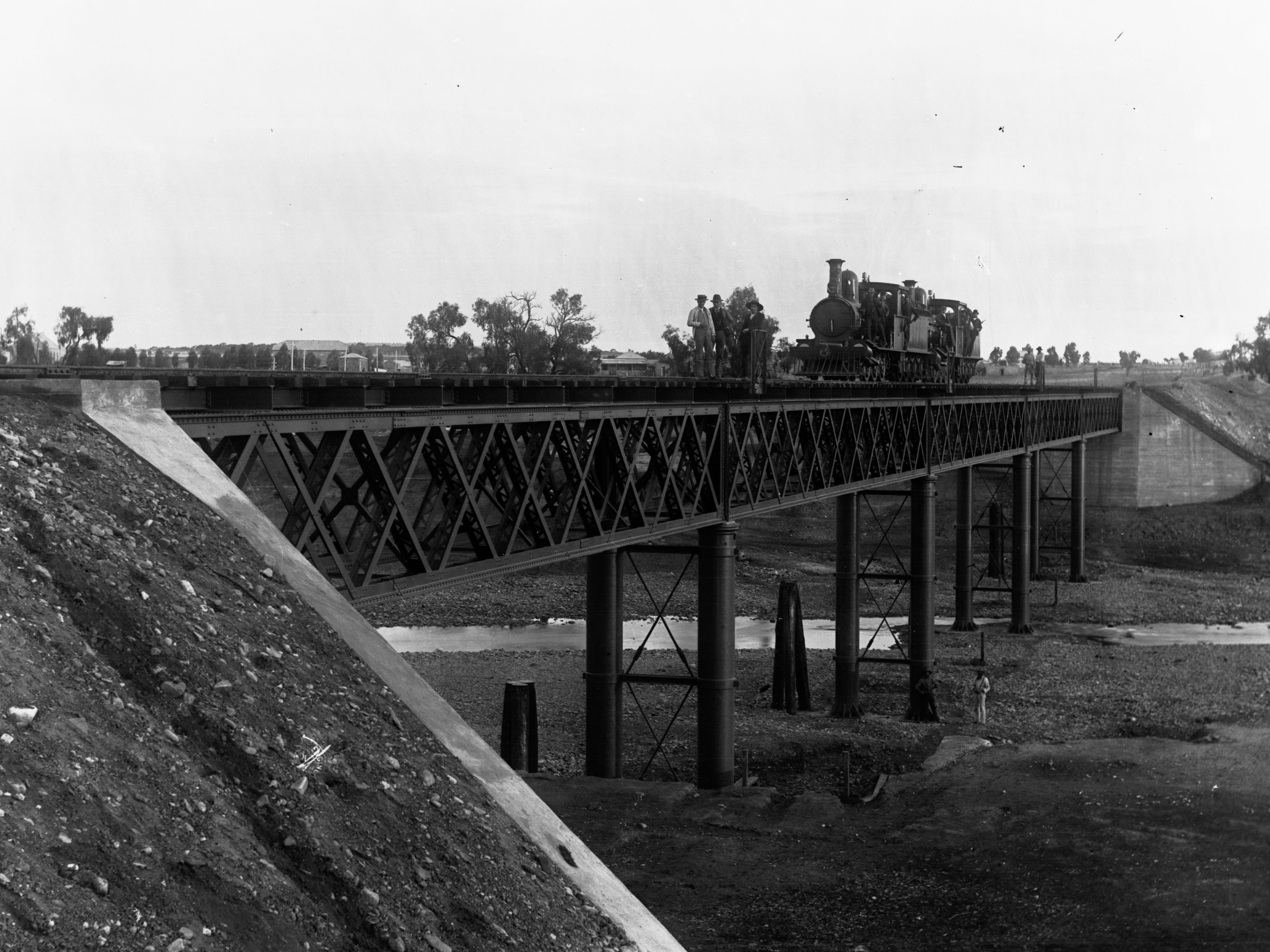
- Load test of the Yacka railway bridge, 1894

General information
- Coordinates: 33.575468522864924°S 138.44269201019458°E
- Operator: Australian National
- Line: Hamley Bridge-Gladstone railway line
- Distance: 172 kilometres from Adelaide
- Platforms: 2
- Tracks: 2

Construction
- Structure type: Ground

Other information
- Status: Closed and demolished

History
- Opened: 2 July 1894
- Closed: 1982 ((passengers); 29 March 1989 (freight)

Services
Preceding station	Australian National Railways Commission	Following station
Brinkworth towards Adelaide	Gladstone railway line	Gulnare towards Gladstone
Location

Yacka railway station was located on the Hamley Bridge-Gladstone railway line. It served the town of Yacka, South Australia.

== History ==
Yacka railway station opened when the railway line from Blyth to Gladstone reached it on 2 July 1894. The line was built as narrow gauge 1,067 mm (3 ft 6 in). The station was a wooden railway station building with a wooden flat roof. There were also rail bridges in the town which were constructed over the Broughton River.

On 1 August 1927, the line was gauge converted to 5 ft 3 in (1,600 mm).

The South Australian Railways Bluebird railcar service to Gladstone ceased by 1982. The remaining freight services ceased in 1989 and the line was removed not long after. The only evidence of the station left today is the station sign.
