= Railway accidents in South Australia =

There have been a number of train accidents on the South Australian railway network. The first known incident in this list occurred in 1873 in Smithfield.

== Fatal accidents ==
=== Glanville, 1880 ===
On 23 September 1880, a woman was run over and killed by an engine at Glanville. She was walking towards the station at Glanville close to the line and within a very short distance of the platform.

=== Dry Creek, 1890 ===
On 21 July 1890, James Cowan, a member of the South Australian Parliament, and his fellow passenger, Mark Bullimore, the local branch manager of the General Electric Supply Company of Australia, were killed when Cowan's horse-drawn buggy collided with a train in Dry Creek, at the intersection of Grand Junction Road and the main railway line running north from Adelaide. The men were proponents of a battery-powered tram trialled in Adelaide the previous year.

=== Walloway, 1901 ===
On 16 November 1901, two people were killed. The accident was sufficient to condemn in the most scathing terms those who were responsible for the inefficient brake system. There were no lights to show the driver that he was approaching the station.

=== Brachina, 1911 ===
On 28 January 1911, a section of the permanent way was washed away in a local flood. A mixed train came upon the broken section of line and was derailed. The engine driver was killed and the fireman was injured; however, passengers and the guard escaped injury.

=== Fords, 1913 ===
On 13 February 1913, there was a washaway near Fords. An engine and several trucks were derailed. The engine driver was washed away and drowned.

=== Mile End, 1924 ===
On 8 January 1924, a woman was knocked down and killed at the Mile-End crossing by a train bound for Sleep's Hill.

=== Cutana, 1928 ===
On 15 February 1928, the fireman of a goods train travelling on the narrow gauge Broken Hill line was crushed to death as the result of a washaway. The fireman of the train was killed.

=== Seacliff, 1942 ===
On 23 May 1942, Sgt. Stanley Patton, Temporary Warrant Officer Class II of Seacliff was fatally hit and killed by a train at Seacliff station. Australian Army Service Corps, Meritorious Service Medal. Son of Andrew and Jane E Patton, husband of Kate Gallear Patton and Father of Fred and Dora.

An inquest into the death of Stanley Patton. 52 - a member of the Australian Military Forces, of Myrtle road, Seacliff, following the incident found inconclusive evidence as to how Patton came to be on the railway line. The coroners report stated that 20-30 people got off the train at the same time as Patton when the train stopped at Seacliff; including several soldiers witnessed on the rear carriages by the ticket officer. It is unclear why the first constable on site was unable to locate a witness or why the soldiers did not comment.

https://trove.nla.gov.au/newspaper/article/128556486?searchTerm=Stanley%20Patton

PATTON.—On May 23, at Adelaide (result of accident), Warrant Officer Stanley Patton (late 9th Field Bakery, A.A.S.C. and 50th Battalion, First A.I.F., beloved husband or Kate Gallear Patton, of 47 Myrtle rd., Seacliff, and loving father of Dora and Fred. Aged 52 years.

=== Copley, 1944 ===
On 11 May 1944, four people were killed. A goods train ran into the rear of a halted troop train at Copley, 604 km north of Adelaide, telescoping the rear cars and resulting in 4 deaths and 27 injuries. The troop train, consisting of 16 carriages, 4 fully laden goods trucks and a brake van, was pulled by a T class locomotive. However, the consist was too heavy for the loco, and it had problems with its injectors after climbing a steep hill. The loco was low on water, and uncoupled from the train to 'run light' to the nearest watering spot and refill. While it was away, the goods train entered the same section of track and struck the rear of the troop train. Only the fact that many troops were lying down saved them from serious injury and decapitation, as the tops of several carriages were shorn off in the impact.

=== Port Germein, 1947 ===
On 10 October 1947, five men were killed instantly and another critically injured when the motor buck-board in which they were travelling from Port Pirie to Whyalla was wrecked by a mixed train at a railway crossing on the Port Pirie-Port Augusta road, about a quarter of a mile from Port Germein. The train, which was travelling from Port Augusta to Port Pirie, struck the buckboard with great force, smashing it to pieces and hurling the occupants many yards along the line.

=== Cavan, 1948 ===
On 20 December 1948, five people were killed when a railway engine and tender hit a tourer car broadside. The dead included a woman (wife of the driver), their three daughters and another relative.

=== Paratoo, 1960 ===
On 27 December 1960, the driver of the Broken Hill Express was killed in a derailment caused by buckled rails.

=== Wasleys Crossing (Gawler), 1970 ===
On 12 April 1970, 17 people were killed and forty-five injured when a double-decker bus crashed into the side of a two-carriage Bluebird passenger train at Wasleys Crossing, near Gawler.

=== Salisbury, 2002 ===
On 24 October 2002, four people were killed when The Ghan interstate passenger train (4AL8), a bus carrying schoolchildren, and a car collided at a level crossing.

=== Virginia, 2007 ===
On 16 November 2007, two people were killed. A small passenger van drove into the path of a Patrick Portlink freight train (6117) at the Moloney Road passive level crossing near Virginia. As a result of the collision, the two occupants in the van were fatally injured. The locomotive crew were shaken but not hurt. The train sustained minor damage but the van was destroyed, the level crossing was closed after another accident two weeks later.

=== Bumbunga, 2009 ===
On 1 August 2009, the lead locomotive of Pacific National freight train 5PM5 collided with a utility motor vehicle at the Bumbunga level crossing. The utility vehicle was seriously damaged as a result of the collision and the male driver and a female passenger were fatally injured.

The man and woman who died were in a car on the Lochiel–Blyth road when an Adelaide-bound freight train hit the vehicle just before 4 pm, killing them instantly. The train, travelling at over 90 kilometres per hour (56 mph), hit the car. The SA-registered, late-model Ford Falcon Utility was split in two. The front half slid across the road and remained near the crossing on its roof. The rear section was dragged over 600 metres (2,000 ft). When the train halted 1,063 metres (3,488 ft) from impact, a car door was still lodged in the train's front. The crossing, near the entrance to the Snowtown–Bumbunga road, had no boomgates or flashing lights at the time. After the incident, the crossing was upgraded to active protection with boom gates and lights, with the upgrade completed by January 2010.

According to Adelaide Now (2009), 33 people had died in SA level-crossing collisions and another 71 were seriously injured since 2001.

=== Nantawarra, 2010 ===
On 22 May 2010, freight train 7MP7 collided with a young male child on the track adjacent to a level crossing near Nantawarra in the mid-north of South Australia. The child was fatally injured as a result of the collision. The investigation found that prior to the collision the child had wandered away from the family home and had unknowingly placed himself in a place of extreme danger on the railway track and there was little the train drivers could do to avoid the collision.

=== Weeroona Island, 2012 ===
On 19 March 2012, there was a fatal crash near Port Pirie in South Australia between a car and a freight train. The crash happened about 9:45am ACDT on Port Flinders Causeway at Weeroona Island, off National Highway One, about seven kilometres north of Port Pirie.

=== Mallala, 2020 ===
On 27 February 2020, Pacific National freight train 3PM7 collided with a four-wheel drive containing two adults on the track adjacent to a private level crossing near Mallala Road, south of Mallala in the south-east of South Australia. The investigation found that prior to the collision, the crossing had no warning signals or barriers to indicate an approaching train. The two adults were fatally injured as a result of the collision.

=== Culburra, 2020 ===
On 19 April 2020, freight train 5PM5 collided with a truck containing an adult male on the track adjacent to the level crossing near Culburra in the south-east of South Australia. The adult truck driver was fatally injured as a result of the collision.

=== East Grange, 2023 ===
On 1 March 2023, a 74 year old woman was hit by an Adelaide bound train while crossing the line at East Grange railway station. The woman died two days later.

=== Ascot Park, 2023 ===
On 18 April 2023, police and paramedics were called to Sixth Avenue and Railway Terrace in Ascot Park after a man on a bicycle was struck by an Adelaide bound train. The man, a 41-year-old from Adelaide, died at the scene.

=== Bindarrah, 2023 ===
On December 31 2023, emergency services were called to the Barrier Highway after Pacific National train 7SP5 with NR41/NR79 collided with a truck. The crash caused the deaths of both train drivers. The truck driver was uninjured.

=== Seacliff, 2026 ===
On October 21 2026, paramedics and police were called to a scene when a person being hit by a train at the Wheatland Street level crossing in Seacliff, and the man died at the scene.

== Accidents involving injuries only ==
=== Adelaide Hills, 1886 ===
On 26 April 1886, a train bringing home many racegoers from the Balhannah races was wrecked at 16-Mile Siding in the Adelaide Hills. There were over 500 passengers on the train. Three of the train crew sustained injuries.

=== Bowden, 1895 ===
On 10 June 1895, a boy was knocked down and injured by a train at a level crossing in Bowden.

=== Cudmore Hill, 1914 ===
ON 28 March 1914, a boiler of the second engine of the Quorn goods train that had departed from Port Augusta exploded with devastating effect. The explosion caused the train to derail. The fireman of the train was injured.

=== Callington, 1929 ===
On 27 December 1929, sixteen passengers were injured when the second division of the Melbourne–Adelaide express derailed.

=== Manoora, 1942 ===
On 26 September 1942, one passenger was hospitalised and four other passengers were treated at the scene when a Terowie to Adelaide passenger train derailed.

=== Strangeways, 1943 ===
On 19 February 1943, a fireman was seriously injured after a head-on collision between a goods train and a troop train north of Quorn.

=== Coomandook, 1945 ===
On 14 February 1945 a fireman and guard were slightly injured when a troop train collided head-on with a goods train.

=== Snowtown, 1945 ===
On 7 April 1945, a guard and two fireman were injured when two freight trains collided head-on in the railway yards.

=== Monteith, 1975 ===
On 10 March 1975, 32 people were injured in the derailment of "The Overland" express.

=== Crystal Brook, 1975 ===
On 24 October 1975, an engine-driver was injured when a goods train was derailed due to a bridge being undermined and collapsing.

=== Port Augusta, 1987 ===
On 17 April 1987, two men were injured when two crewless locomotives slipped their brakes, ran away and crashed head-on into parked diesels.

=== Redhill, 1989 ===
On 11 July 1989, 65 people were injured when the Australian National operated Adelaide-bound Indian Pacific collided with a packed passenger train standing on the Redhill railway siding. Despite the heavy impact, neither train was derailed and the Indian Pacific continued to Adelaide after a safety check. A board of inquiry set-up after the collision blamed the driver of the Indian Pacific for failing to heed two warning signals before ploughing head-on into the Express Limited.

=== Kyancutta, 1992 ===
On 14 December 1992, two people were injured when an Australian National grain train, powered by three diesel locos, collided with a fully laden semi-trailer, at a level crossing at Kyancutta. The truck immediately burst into flames, but the three engine drivers risked their lives and pulled the two injured people free. CFS staff cut the couplings to the front loco, which was on fire, and the drivers reversed the rest of the train from danger.

=== Mount Christie, 1997 ===
On 22 February 1997, five people were injured when a Melbourne-bound AN freighter collided with a Perth-bound NRC steel carrier collided on the main line near the Mount Christie railway siding, 130 km west of Tarcoola. Five crew members were injured and three AN Class and one EL Class locomotive were damaged. A remodelled CLP Class locomotive was destroyed. Rolling stock escaped damage.

=== Two Wells, 2007 ===
On 6 August 2007, a loaded sewage truck drove into the path of the south-bound passenger train, The Ghan (7DA8), at the Murrow Farm level crossing near Two Wells. The driver of the truck was seriously injured and the truck was destroyed. The train's lead locomotive was severely damaged in the collision but the train driver was uninjured. Two minor injuries were recorded by passengers on the train and there was minor damage to the track.

=== Emerson, 2017 ===
On 6 September 2017, a Mercedes-Benz sedan drove into the path of a passenger train, an Adelaide Metro electric train (4009), at the Black Forest level crossing near Clarence Gardens. The driver of the vehicle was seriously injured and the sedan was destroyed. The train's lead power car received minor damaged in the collision but the train driver was uninjured.

=== Two Wells, 2018 ===
On 25 June 2018, a car collided with north-bound freight train 2MP5 on the Temby Road intersection, sliding into the side of the train travelling at approximately 100 km/h. The 55-year-old driver was treated at the scene for head lacerations and neck pain. The locomotive driver was uninjured. Minor repairs were made to the train and no track damage was reported.

== Other accidents ==
=== Smithfield, 1873 ===
On 20 June 1873, a mechanical failure befell the engine hauling the Adelaide-Kapunda tno

n near Smithfield. A tyre on the engine broke. The engine was derailed and goods and passenger wagons were smashed.

=== Mitcham, 1927 ===
On 9 March 1927, there was a rear-end collision between a goods train and the Adelaide express.

=== Fosters's Corner, Belair, 1929 ===
On 10 January 1929, 21 wagons containing livestock became separate from a southbound goods train. The wagons careered downgrade and eventually derailed. No humans were injured although livestock were killed in the accident.

=== Mount Lofty, 1931 ===
On 28 March 1931, a passenger train from Adelaide to Bridgewater was directed down a dead-end siding where it crashed through the dead-end structure.

=== Ambleside, 1948 ===
On 14 August 1948, an Adelaide-bound goods train derailed near the end of the loop outside Ambleside yard. No one was injured.

=== Stockyard Creek, 1951 ===
On 19 October 1951, a passenger train struck a goods train from behind. No one was injured.

=== Tintinara, 1962 ===
On 3 July 1962, a goods train travelling from Melbourne to Adelaide was derailed. No one was injured.

=== Callington, 1972 ===
On 20 December 1972, The Mile End (Adelaide) to Tailem Bend goods train was derailed.

=== Jacobs Creek, 1977 ===
On 19 June 1977, a cement and stone train was derailed after striking three steers.

=== Balyarta, 1977 ===
On 22 July 1977, an overnight Adelaide-Melbourne express goods train derailed.

=== Renmark, 1980 ===
On 17 December 1980, a goods train was derailed.

=== Appamurra, 1992 ===
On 24 July 1992, a grain train derailed near Appamurra.

=== Roopena, 2007 ===
On 22 May 2007, ballast train 3MR2 derailed near Roopena (between Whyalla and Port Augusta). The derailment occurred about 28 track kilometres north of Whyalla. Twenty seven ballast wagons were derailed but there were no injuries.

=== Birkenhead, 2008 ===
At about 1448 on Wednesday 5 March 2008, a double road-train loaded with bulk cement drove into the path of a train that was conveying four empty fuel tankers at the Stirling Street level crossing, Birkenhead. The impact speed of both the train and road-train was low (about 15 km/h) but sufficient to roll the prime mover and the first semitrailer onto their sides and to derail the lead bogie of the train's locomotive. The road-train driver was slightly injured; the two train drivers were shaken but otherwise unhurt.

=== Bates, 2008 ===
On 19 April 2008, freight train 5PS6, travelling from Perth to Sydney, derailed near Bates. The derailment occurred about 13 track kilometres east of Bates. Thirteen wagons were derailed and about 800m of track was damaged. There were no injuries.

=== Mount Christie, 2008 ===
On 1 September 2008, 13 wagons on freight train 1MP9 derailed near Mount Christie. There were no injuries, but about 4.5 km of track was damaged.

=== Keith, 2010 ===
On 8 October 2010, freight train 5MP5 travelling from Melbourne to Perth reported having derailed on the Defined Interstate Rail Network (DIRN) between Wirrega and Keith.

=== Cadney Park, 2010 ===
On 25 November 2010, freight train 4DA2 derailed on the Central Australian Railway line just south of Cadney Park. There were no injuries as a result of the derailment but there was significant damage to rolling stock and about 300m of track required renewal.

=== Dry Creek, 2011 ===
On 11 October 2011, ore train 1901, travelling on the interstate main rail line, collided with grain train 5132 as the grain train was entering the Dry Creek rail yard in Adelaide. No person was injured but there was significant damage to rolling stock.

=== Adelaide, 2011 ===
On 24 February 2011. a suburban Adelaide Metro commuter train (215A) with 17 passengers on board was being routed from the Up South Main Line into platform 5 at Adelaide station. At about the same time a second commuter train (G231) with 22 passengers on board that was departing the Adelaide Station passed signal 141 located at the end of platform 3 at low speed. Shortly thereafter both drivers realised that their trains would come into conflict and applied their train brakes but it was too late to avoid a collision. There were no injuries as a result of the collision; however, both trains sustained minor damage.

=== Port Augusta, 2011 ===
On 6 May 2011, freight train 4PM6 derailed the trailing bogie of the 49th wagon (RQHY 07069C) at Port Augusta near the Carlton Parade level crossing (91.559 km). About 1300 m later, the wagon re-railed itself as it entered the road pavement near the Stirling Road level crossing. There were no injuries as a result of the derailment but there was minor damage to rolling stock and track.

=== Fisher, 2011 ===
On 28 May 2011, intermodal freight train 5MP9 was travelling from Melbourne to Perth when it experienced a catastrophic failure of a locomotive wheel at about the 849.700 track kilometre mark near Fisher on the Nullarbor Plain. There were no injuries. The locomotive did not derail but separated wheel fragments damaged the locomotive traction motor and associated components. The single-line track incurred four rail breaks and broken sleepers over a distance of about 1 km.

=== Keswick, 2015 ===
On 31 March 2015, a freight train entering the Keswick yards (2MP9) collided with the rear of another train (2MP1), derailing four wagons and blocking two level crossings for several hours.

=== Grange, 2022 ===
On 23 November 2022, a passenger train overshot the railway line at the terminus at Grange station.

=== Two Wells, 2023 ===
On 15 February 2023, Bowmans Rail's 1421S from Pelican Point to Bowmans derailed due to a heat buckle outside of Two Wells.

=== Edwardstown, 2025 ===
On 24 April 2025 at roughly 5:20 pm, a car collided with a train at the level crossing intersection of South Road and Cross Road. There were no reports of serious injuries.

== See also ==
- List of rail accidents
