= Commonwealth Railways CB class railcar =

Diesel multiple unit railcar

CB class railcar
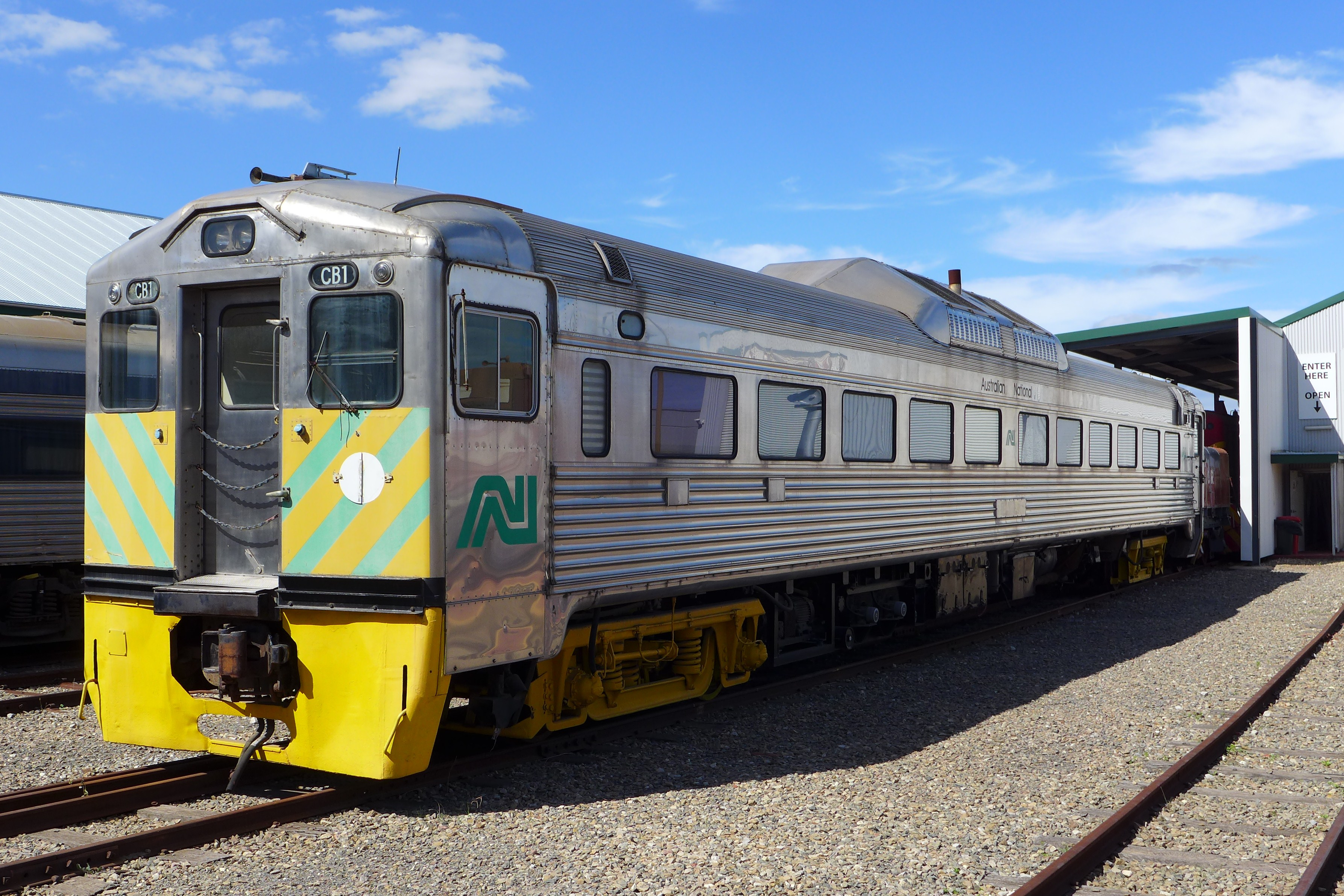
- CB1 at the National Railway Museum, Port Adelaide in April 2014
- Manufacturer: Budd Company
- Built at: Philadelphia, United States
- Entered service: 1951
- Number built: 3
- Number scrapped: 1
- Fleet numbers: CB1-CB3
- Operator: Commonwealth Railways

Specifications
- Car length: 25.91 m (85 ft 0 in)
- Traction system: Diesel mechanical
- Prime mover: General Motors 110
- Track gauge: 1,435 mm (4 ft 8 1/2 in)

The CB class railcar were a type of Budd Rail Diesel Cars operated by the Commonwealth Railways and Australian National in Australia from 1951 until 1990.

== History ==
In October 1950, Commonwealth Railways placed an order for three Budd RDC-1 railcars. They were the first stainless steel carriages in Australia. After being trialled on the Trans-Australian Railway between Port Augusta and Kalgoorlie they entered service in May 1951 between Port Pirie Junction and Pimba, being extended to Woomera and Tarcoola in 1952. Four second-hand Brill carriages from the Reading Company were imported for use as trailers.

All were delivered with twin General Motors engines. In the mid-1960s, CB3 received Rolls-Royce engines.

In January 1961, the services were cut back to Woomera. Following the extension of the standard gauge line from Port Augusta to Marree in 1957 and Whyalla in 1972, the Budd cars began to operate to these destinations.

All three passed to Australian National in July 1975 who withdrew them shortly after and placed them in store at Port Augusta. After refurbishment, they returned to service to operate the Iron Triangle Limited between Adelaide, Port Pirie, Port Augusta and Whyalla from April 1986, and the Silver City Limited between Adelaide and Broken Hill from December 1986.

In February 1988, CB3 was damaged in a level crossing accident in Penfield and not repaired while the other two were withdrawn in December 1990 and placed in store at Port Pirie after Australian National withdrew all of its South Australian passenger services. CB1 was donated to the National Railway Museum, Port Adelaide in August 1996 while the other two were included in the sale of Australian National to Australian Southern Railroad in August 1997, being sold to Bluebird Engineering in 1999.

CB2 is now privately owned and was transferred from Adelaide back to Port Augusta by road in October 2008. It remains in storage at the Port Augusta railyards and can be seen from the pedestrian rail crossing at the end of Commercial Road. CB3 was scrapped on 9 September 2011 at Port Pirie.
