= Whyalla railway station =

Former railway station in South Australia, Australia

Whyalla

General information
- Location: McBryde Terrace, Whyalla
- Coordinates: 33.02°S 137.34°E
- System: Former Australian National regional rail
- Operator: Australian National
- Line: Whyalla
- Platforms: 1

Construction
- Structure type: Ground

Other information
- Status: Closed and demolished

History
- Opened: 6 October 1972
- Closed: 31 December 1990

Services
Preceding station	Australian Rail Track Corporation	Following station
Port Augusta Terminus	Whyalla railway line	Terminus
Location

Whyalla railway station was the terminus station of the Whyalla line serving the South Australian city of Whyalla.

== History ==
Whyalla station was opened on 6 October 1972 by Prime Minister William McMahon at the same time as the Whyalla line.

== Services ==
When it opened, the station was served by a daily service from Adelaide operated by CB class railcars. The service was withdrawn in 1975.

On 21 April 1986, the service was reintroduced as the Iron Triangle Limited. It was withdrawn on 31 December 1990 when Australian National withdrew all its South Australian passenger services. The station was demolished in 2012.
