= Gulnare railway station =

Station in South Australia, 1894 to 1986

Gulnare

General information
- Location: Railway Terrace, Gulnare, South Australia
- Coordinates: 33°28′05″S 138°26′38″E
- System: Former Australian National regional rail
- Owner: South Australian Railways 1894 - 1978 Australian National 1978 - 1989
- Operator: South Australian Railways 1894 - 1978 Australian National 1978 - 1986
- Line: Gladstone line
- Distance: 185 kilometres from Adelaide
- Platforms: 2
- Tracks: 2

Construction
- Structure type: Ground

Other information
- Status: Demolished

History
- Opened: 12 May 1894
- Closed: December 1986

Services
Preceding station	Australian National Railways Commission	Following station
Yacka towards Adelaide	Gladstone railway line	Georgetown towards Gladstone
Location

Gulnare railway station was located on the Hamley Bridge-Gladstone railway line and served the town of Gulnare, South Australia.

== History ==
Gulnare railway station opened on 12 May 1894 as part of the extension of what was then known as the Blyth railway line. The station consisted of a goods and passenger accommodation. The station derived its name from Gulnare Plain discovered by John A Horrocks in 1841, and named after his favourite dog. Regular passenger services most likely ceased in December 1986 with the line north of Gulnare being closed on 11 May 1988, followed by the Balaklava to Gulnare section on 29 March 1989. The section of track was removed by late 1989.
