= Copper Coast Rail Trail =

Rail trail in South Australia

- Length: 25 km (16 mi)
- Location: Yorke Peninsula, South Australia
- Trailheads: Kadina, Wallaroo, Moonta
- Use: Hiking, cycling
- Season: all
- Hazards: some at-level road crossings
- Surface: sealed
- Right of way: Balaklava-Moonta railway line
- Website: www.railtrails.org.au/trails/copper-coast-rail-trail/

The Copper Coast Rail Trail is a rail trail in the Australian state of South Australia following the course of the disused Balaklava-Moonta railway line in the Yorke Peninsula of South Australia. It is open to pedestrians and cyclists, and runs for 25 km from Kadina to Moonta.

== Details ==
From Kadina it follows the old line until Wallaroo with a new extension built in 2022 to Moonta. The path is sealed through the entire journey with some level road crossings, playgrounds and parks. The former stations and sidings in this section were Wallaroo Mines, Wallaroo, Cross Roads and Moonta.

The trail was opened in 2017 after the line after the line between Kadina and Wallaroo was dismantled. The trail was extended to Moonta in 2022.
