= Brinkworth railway station, South Australia =

Former railway station in South Australia, Australia

Brinkworth
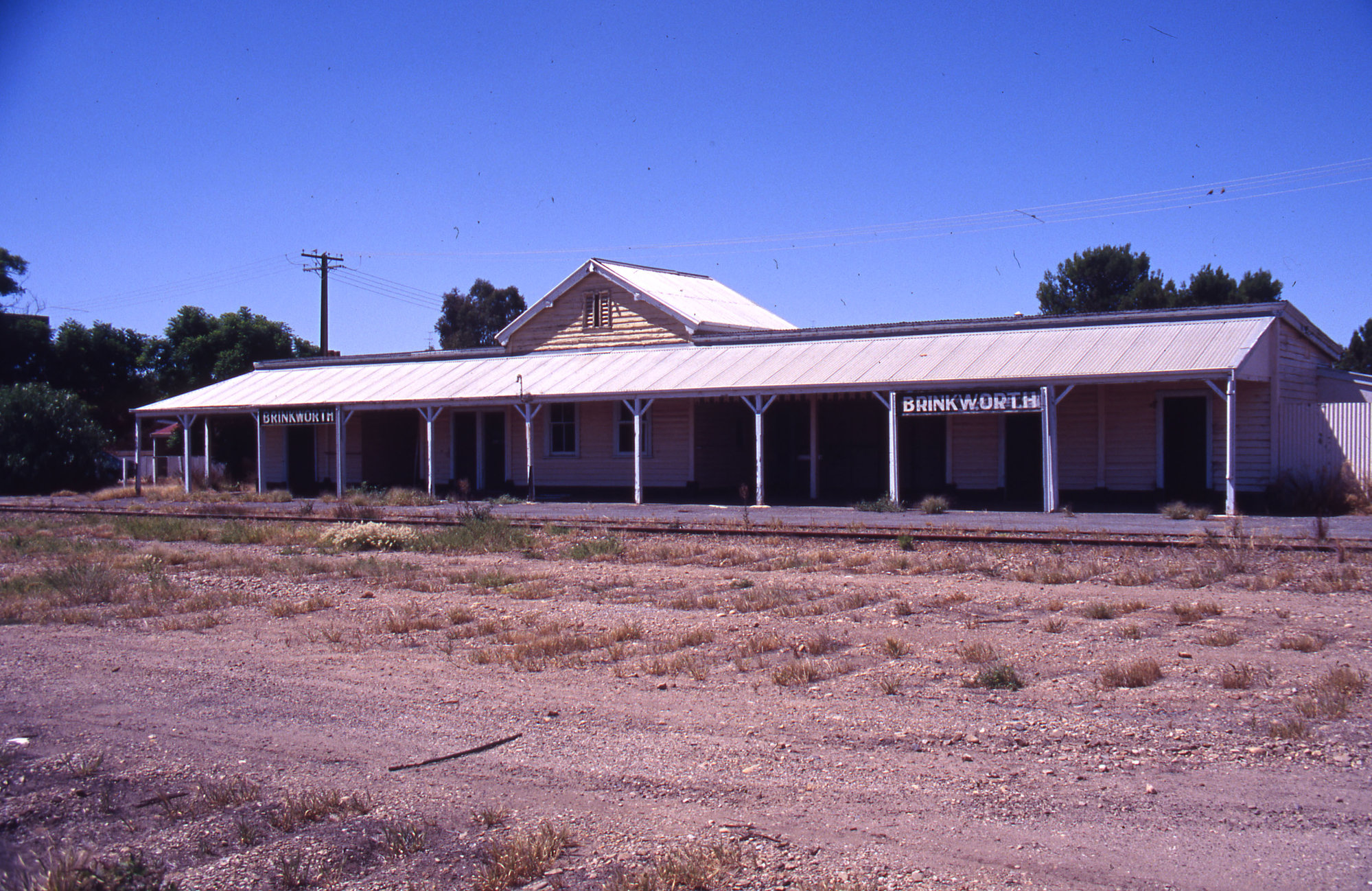
- Brinkworth railway station, (4 March 1994)

General information
- Location: Main Street, Brinkworth, South Australia
- Coordinates: 33.696047012157514°S 138.40433282007714°E
- Operator: Australian National
- Line: Hamley Bridge-Gladstone railway line
- Distance: 155 kilometres from Adelaide
- Platforms: 2
- Tracks: 2

Construction
- Structure type: Ground

Other information
- Status: Closed, mostly demolished

History
- Opened: 2 July 1894
- Closed: 1982 (passengers); 20 February 1990 (freight)

Services
Preceding station	Australian National Railways Commission	Following station
Blyth towards Adelaide	Gladstone railway line	Yacka towards Gladstone
Preceding station	Australian National Railways Commission	Following station
Terminus	Kadina-Brinkworth railway line	Condowie towards Kadina
Location

Brinkworth railway station was located at the junction of the Hamley Bridge-Gladstone railway line and the Kadina-Brinkworth railway line. It served the town of Brinkworth, South Australia.

== History ==
Brinkworth railway station opened when the railway line from Snowtown and the line from Blyth to Gladstone reached it on 2 July 1894. Both lines were originally built as narrow gauge 1,067 mm (3 ft 6 in). Brinkworth was eventually described as “the Great Junction of the Blyth, Snowtown and Gladstone Railways”.

On 1 August 1927, both lines were gauge converted to 5 ft 3 in (1,600 mm).

A concrete weir and a four million gallon capacity reservoir was constructed to the east on Magpie Creek to serve the railway complex. Grain silos were later added in 1956, 1969 and 1970 to handle bulk grain transportation by road.

The railcar service to Moonta ceased by 1972. In 1959, passenger services to, through and from Brinkworth to Adelaide began to be served by new South Australian Railways Bluebird railcars but they too ceased by 1982. The line from Gladstone through Brinkworth to Adelaide was closed on 29 March 1989 with the grain trade being let to road transport and the remaining line from Snowtown closed on 20 February 1990. The lines and the rail yards through Brinkworth were removed after 1991. The station building was demolished in November 1996 due to it being eaten by white ants.

The Peppertree Trail, a 2.4 km long trail now runs along the old track, from the original stockyards to the junction where the lines diverged to Blyth or Snowtown. The old railway turntable, the water tower, 2 disused railway platforms and a goods crane are all that remain of the station today along with various other remnants like old farming instruments, a section car on display and various information signs telling the history about the town, the railways and the station.
