= Lochiel railway line =

Former railway line in South Australia

Overview
- Status: Closed and removed
- Termini: Bumbunga; Lochiel
- Continues from: Adelaide-Port Augusta line

History
- Opened: 1926
- Closed: 1981

Technical
- Line length: 8.04 km (5.00 mi)
- Track gauge: 1,600 mm (5 ft 3 in)

The Lochiel railway line was a railway line that branched off the Adelaide-Port Augusta railway line at Bumbunga. It opened in 1926 and closed in 1981.

== History ==
The Lochiel railway line opened in 1926 being 5 miles in length. It was built to serve the Australian Salt Company salt works which had been operating since the late 1880s on Lake Bumbunga. Along a station, a siding was laid to the company's refinery on the shore of the lake, about three-quarters of a mile away. There was also a siding at Bumbunga. The line closed in 1981 when the salt works were closed and salt harvesting became a stop-start business managed from afar.
