= Blyth railway station, South Australia =

Former railway station in South Australia, Australia

Blyth

General information
- Location: Harley Street, Blyth, South Australia
- Coordinates: 33.84418147795545°S 138.48723433218865°E
- Operator: Australian National
- Line: Gladstone line
- Distance: 135 kilometres from Adelaide
- Platforms: 1
- Tracks: 2

Construction
- Structure type: Ground

Other information
- Status: Closed

History
- Opened: 1876
- Closed: 29 March 1989

Services
Preceding station	Australian National Railways Commission	Following station
Kybunga towards Adelaide	Gladstone railway line	Brinkworth towards Gladstone
Location

Blyth railway station was located on the Hamley Bridge-Gladstone railway line. It served the town of Blyth, South Australia.

== History ==
Blyth railway station opened in 1876 on the narrow gauge railway line to Port Wakefield. The line was extended to Gladstone on 2 July 1894. Blyth station was a fine stone gable ended station building and was named after Sir Arthur Blyth who was one time a minister of the Crown and Agent-General.

On 1 August 1927, the line through Blyth was gauge converted to 5 ft 3 in (1,600 mm).

In 1978, the station and all associated infrastructure were included in the transfer of South Australian Railways to Australian National. For various reasons, the line through Blyth had become obsolete and was removed by late 1989.

The old station building and goods shed remain but are now used by a trucking firm and have fallen into a state of disrepair.
