= Bowmans Rail =

Australian railway operator

- Formerly: Bowmans International
- Industry: Logistics
- Founded: 2003
- Founder: Balco; Patrick Corporation
- Headquarters: Bowmans, South Australia
- Number of locations: Balaklava, South Australia
- Key people: Malcolm May (CEO)
- Owners: Malcolm May, Vic Hilliard, David Martin, Joseph Hayden
- Website: www.bowmansrail.com.au

Bowmans Rail was an Australian railway operator hauling freight in South Australia.

== History ==
Bowmans Rail was founded as Bowmans Intermodal in 2003. It was a joint venture between hay processor and exporter Balco, and logistics operator Patrick Corporation, each owning 50%. A railway terminal was built with a one-kilometre siding was built at Bowmans, South Australia.

in September 2012 Toll Holdings and AGT Foods Australia purchased Patrick's shareholding. The company adopted its current name in 2016, when it transported over 36,000 containers annually.

The company operates freight services from Bowmans and Port Pirie to Port Adelaide; conveying lead, hay, grain, pulses, seed, wine and pork bellies, as well as the importation of fish bait. Since 2016 the company has transported mineral sands for Tronox Mining between Broken Hill and Port Adelaide, and in 2017 intended to commence an Adelaide to Leigh Creek intermodal service for the mining and petroleum industries.

Bowmans Rail opened a new intermodal terminal near Port Augusta in March 2018. The site was adjacent to the Bungala Solar Power Farm which was under construction and would receive solar panels and other construction materials by rail to reduce the number of trucks accessing the site via unsealed roads. The new terminal on the former Leigh Creek line was expected to handle 2,000 containers per annum.

Locomotives and crew were initially provided by the Australian Railroad Group until Rail First Asset Management took over in 2004.

== Locomotives ==
Bowmans Rail hire locomotives from Rail First, below is the list of hired locos:

Formerly with Bowmans Rail Logos:

EL63, GL111, CM3308, CM3309

CFCLA/Rail First Logos as of February 2024:

EL53, EL54, EL55, EL63
