= Balaklava railway station =

Former railway station in South Australia, Australia

Balaklava
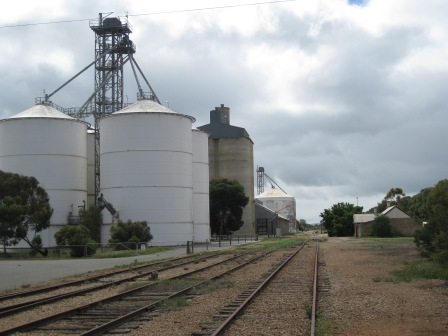
- The disused railway yard at Balaklava ( September 2009 )

General information
- Location: Railway Terrace, Balaklava, South Australia
- Coordinates: 34.143969326525564°S 138.41498165181127°E
- Owner: South Australian Railways ( 1870 - 1978 ) Australian National ( 1978 - 1997 ) One Rail Australia ( 1997 - 2022 ) Aurizon ( 2022 - Present )
- Operator: South Australian Railways ( 1870 - 1978 ) Australian National ( 1978 - 1997 ) One Rail Australia ( 1997 - 2005 )
- Line: Hamley Bridge-Gladstone line
- Distance: 95.5 kilometres from Adelaide
- Platforms: 1
- Tracks: 1

Construction
- Structure type: Ground

Other information
- Status: Closed

History
- Opened: 1870
- Closed: 1969 ( Passengers ) 2005 ( Freight )

Services
Preceding station	Australian National Railways Commission	Following station
Hoskin Corner towards Adelaide	Gladstone railway line	Halbury towards Gladstone
Preceding station	Australian National Railways Commission	Following station
Terminus	Balaklava-Moonta railway line	Saints towards Moonta
Location

Balaklava railway station was located at the junction of the Hamley Bridge-Gladstone railway line and Balaklava-Moonta railway line in the town of Balaklava, South Australia.

== History ==
Balaklava railway station opened in 1870, named after the battle which took place in the Bay of Balaklava in Crimea Peninsula. Along with the station, the narrow gauge horse drawn tramway to Hoyleton opened, which was later extended to Blyth on 1 March 1876. The station opened with very basic facilities at first. By August 1876, the line had been operated entirely by steam locomotives. On 15 January 1880, the narrow gauge railway line from Hamley Bridge to Balaklava opened, thus making it an important junction station. Following the line's opening, Balaklava station was upgraded with a new residential accommodation, a new building built with coursed sandstone and brick quoins and a new goods shed.

In 1927, both lines through Balaklava were converted to broad gauge in 1927.

Refreshment rooms were constructed in Balaklava during 1939, which replaced the ones at Brinkworth, which had closed two days earlier. The new refreshment rooms in Balaklava opened on 11 March 1940. The refreshment rooms closed on 31 March 1972.

A large iron wheat silo was constructed in 1956, also being one of the first in that region. During 1957 / 58, bulk grain transportation commenced from Balaklava. Most of the old mill siding, and overhead water tank for steam locomotives were demolished in 1963.

Following an announcement by the minister of transport on 9 May 1968, passenger services ceased the following year in 1969. A report in 1973 recommended the closure of the Hamley Bridge to Balaklava section of the line, and the demolition of the refreshment rooms and station master's residence although the Hamley Bridge to Balaklava line remained open. In March 1978, the ownership of the station and lines were included in the transfer of the South Australian Railways to Australian National. The station closed to the delivery of receipt and goods on 12 August 1978. With the closure of the Balaklava to Paskeville on 4 April 1984 and Balaklava to Gladstone line between 1987 and 1989, grain became the last remaining traffic on the remaining rail link from Balaklava to Adelaide. The station became unattended on 31 October 1987. Grain trains continued into the early 2000s, along with some special train tours. The last train to the town left on 1 March 2005 with locomotives 843 - 841.

The station building, water columns and goods shed became heritage listed around 1990. The turntable began a restoration process in 2017 and by 2019, the project was well advanced and the area was cleared and the turntable cabin had been re-clad. As of 2025, much of the station infrastructure remain but are disused.
