= Kadina–Brinkworth railway line =

Former railway line in South Australia

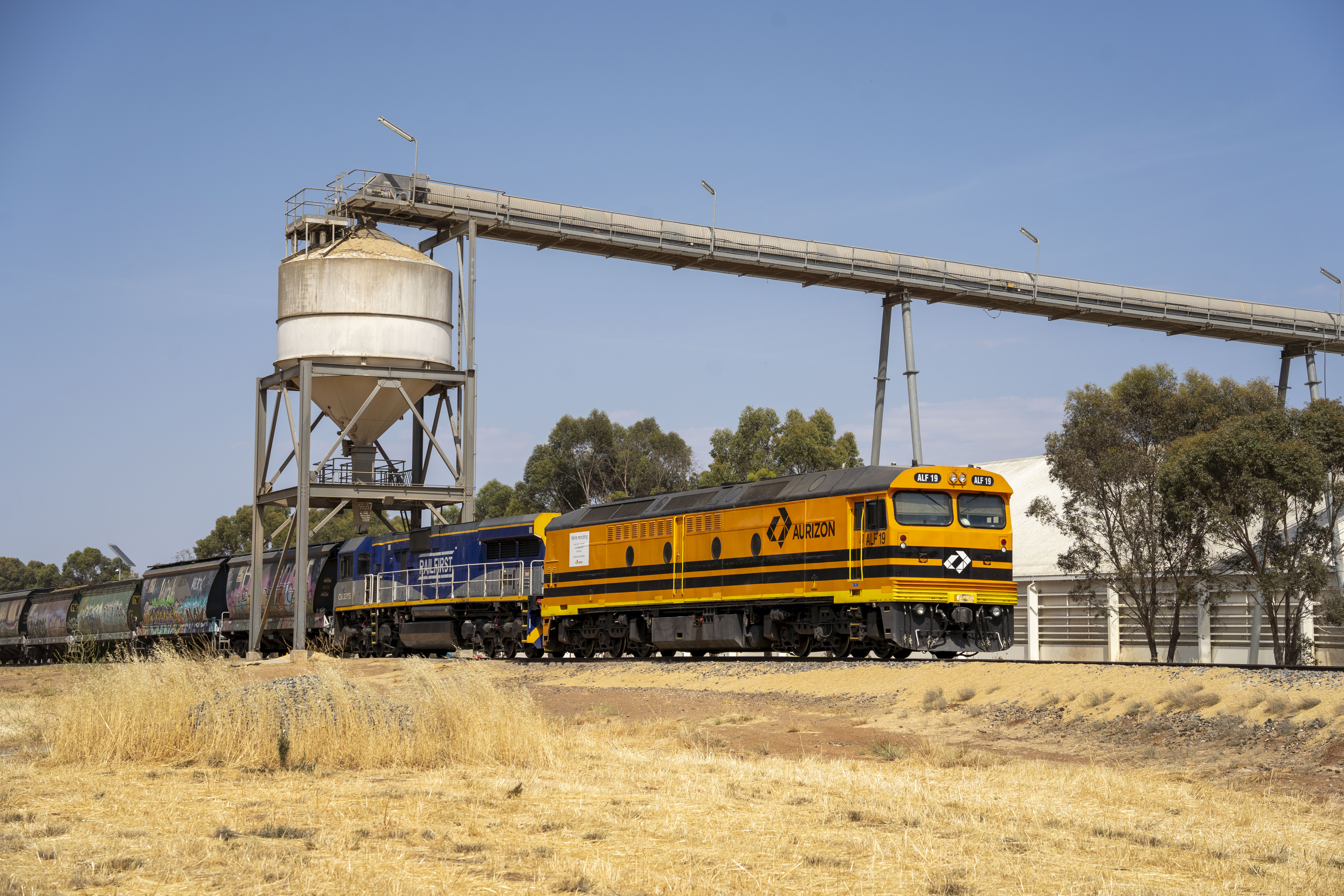
- An Aurizon grain train loading at Viterra Snowtown in November 2023, the last active section of the former Kadina-Brinkworth line

Overview
- Status: Closed
- Locale: Mid North, South Australia
- Termini: Kadina; Brinkworth
- Continues from: Balaklava-Moonta line
- Continues as: Hamley Bridge-Gladstone line

Service
- System: South Australian Railways
- Operator(s): South Australian Railways; Australian National

History
- Opened: Kadina-Snowtown: 1 October 1879; Snowtown-Brinkworth: 2 July 1894
- Closed: Snowtown-Brinkworth: 20 February 1990; Kadina-Snowtown: 3 March 1993

Technical
- Line length: 95.3 km (59.2 mi)
- Track gauge: 1,435 mm (4 ft 8 1/2 in); 1,600 mm (5 ft 3 in)
- Old gauge: 1,067 mm (3 ft 6 in)

The Kadina–Brinkworth railway line was a railway line on the South Australian Railways network.

== History ==
The first section of the line opened on 1 October 1879 from Kadina to Snowtown, branching off from the Balaklava-Moonta line. It was extended to Brinkworth on 2 July 1894 where it joined the Hamley Bridge-Gladstone line. On 1 August 1927, the line was gauge converted from 1,067 mm (3 ft 6 in) to 1,600 mm (5 ft 3 in).

The section from Kadina to Snowtown was converted to dual gauge on 2 December 1982 with an extra 1,435 mm (4 ft 8 1/2 in) rail laid following the conversion of the Adelaide-Port Augusta line. The Snowtown to Brinkworth section closed on 20 February 1990 followed by the rest of the line on 3 March 1993.
