= Port Augusta railway station =

Railway station in South Australia

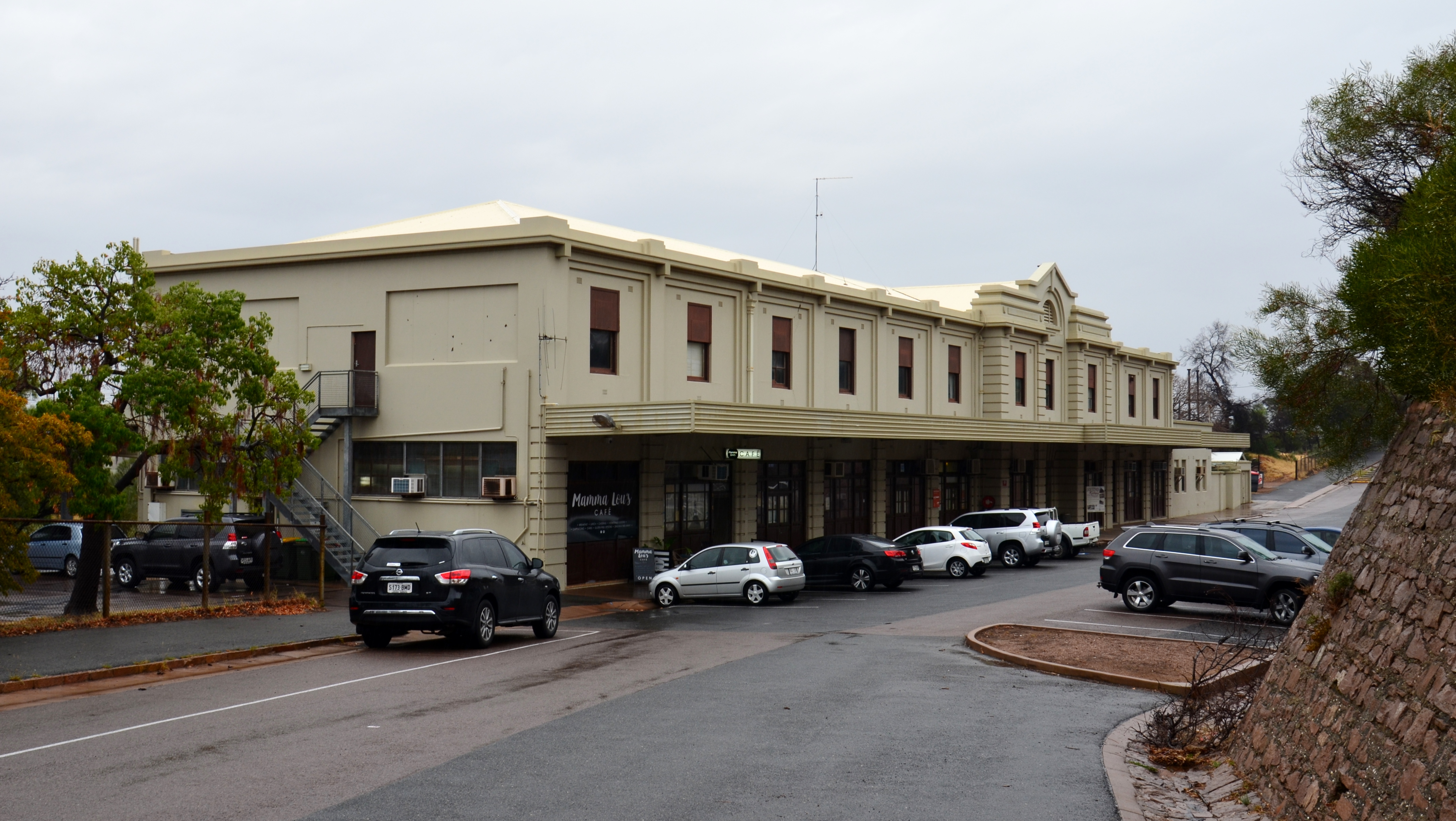

General information
- Location: Stirling Road, Port Augusta
- Coordinates: 32.4937°S 137.7672°E
- Line: Adelaide–Port Augusta
- Platforms: 2 (1 island)

Construction
- Structure type: Ground

Other information
- Status: Unstaffed

Services
| Preceding station | Australian Rail Track Corporation | Following station |
|---|---|---|
| Stirling North towards Adelaide | Adelaide–Port Augusta railway line | Terminus |
| Terminus | Trans-Australian Railway | Tent Hill towards Kalgoorlie |
| Terminus | Whyalla railway line | Whyalla Terminus |
| Preceding station | Commonwealth Railways | Following station |
|---|---|---|
| Terminus | Central Australia Railway | Stirling North towards Alice Springs |
Location

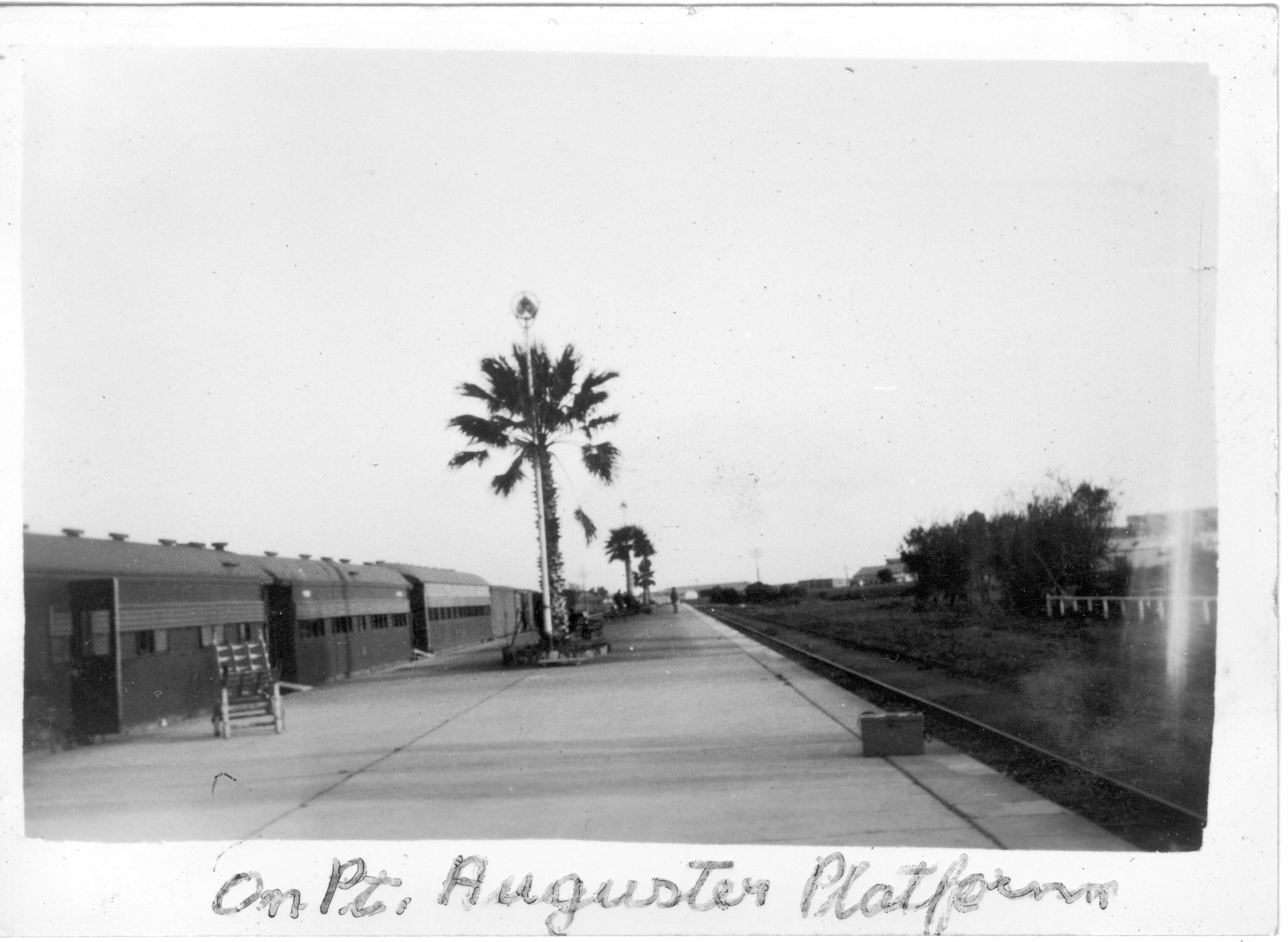
The station, c.1930s

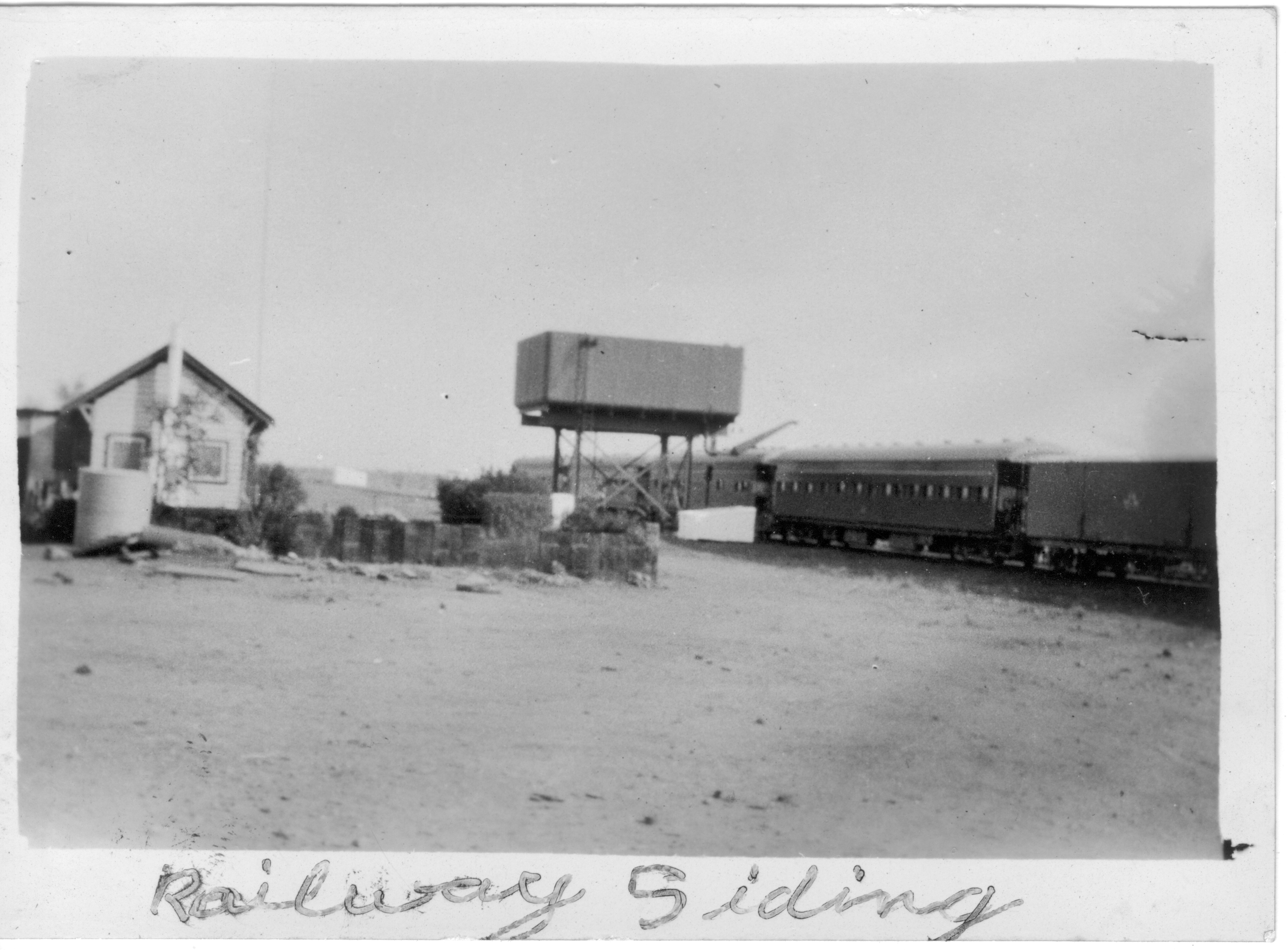
The siding, c.1930s

Port Augusta railway station is a railway station located on the Adelaide–Port Augusta railway line in Port Augusta, South Australia.

== History ==
In 1878, the first railway line in to Port Augusta was when it became the southern terminus of a proposed line to Darwin. Under South Australian ownership the narrow gauge railway, known as the Great Northern Railway, was extended in stages and reached Oodnadatta in 1891. In 1882, this line also connected Port Augusta to Adelaide when the Peterborough–Quorn railway line was completed, as there was already railway from Peterborough to Adelaide. The original Port Augusta railway station was on Commercial Road, and is now heritage listed and used as an art gallery. The railway continued through what later became railyards, through the original station, and down Commercial Road to the wharf area.

The South Australian Government subsequently made offers to several syndicates to construct a line north from Oodnadatta to Pine Creek on the land grant system, however negotiations were unsuccessful and Oodnadatta remained the railhead. The line passed to Commonwealth ownership on 1 January 1911, but continued to be operated by the South Australian Railways until the Commonwealth Railways took over operations on 1 January 1926. An extension of the railway to Alice Springs was completed in 1929.

Between 1913 and 1917, the standard gauge Trans-Australian Railway was built from Port Augusta to Kalgoorlie in Western Australia, entering the town from another direction and the station from the other end. Thus Port Augusta became a break of gauge station until the standard gauge line was extended to Port Pirie Junction in 1937. The new station provided for transfer of passenger and goods between trains on the standard gauge line to Kalgoorlie and the narrow gauge line to Oodnadatta and Adelaide (via Peterborough, and another break of gauge at Terowie). The new two-storey station building was 160 by 48 feet (49 m × 15 m) and provided 1,000 feet (300 m) platform for standard gauge trains and 720 feet (220 m) platform for narrow gauge trains.

In 1957, a new standard gauge Stirling North to Marree line was built via Leigh Creek, replacing the line via Quorn. In 1972, the Whyalla line opened to Whyalla to serve Whyalla Steelworks. In 2001, the narrow gauge line between Port Augusta and Quorn was re-opened by the Pichi Richi Railway Preservation Society.

Port Augusta has long been an important railway centre, with Downer Rail having a plant in the city.

Journey Beyond's The Ghan and Indian Pacific services pass Port Augusta on the Adelaide–Port Augusta railway line but do not stop at the station.
