= Harold More Cooper =

Harold More Cooper (also Harold Moore Cooper, (Note: South Australian Births, Deaths and Marriages shows his birth name was registered as Harold Moore, whereas his death registration shows his given name as Harold More. In some academic references his full name is given as Harold Moore Cooper, but the majority of Australian Government sources spell his middle name "More".) born 29 December 1886 in North Adelaide, South Australia, died 14 May 1970 in Glenelg, South Australia) was a radio operator, anthropologist and historian.

Cooper was the eldest son of Robert Cooper, an accountant, and his wife Mary Antill née Osborne. After his schooling and traveling to Europe, he worked until 1926 as a radio operator in a telegraph company. Privately, he ran an experimental amateur radio station at his home in Glenelg, South Australia, making worldwide contacts and participating in research on the effects of climate factors and solar turbulence on shortwave radio. He also operated a radio link between the Watheroo Magnetic Observatory in Western Australia and Washington DC in the United States.

From 1934 Cooper studied local Aboriginal historic sites with a special focus on sites at Hallett Cove and Kangaroo Island. In 1941 he was appointed assistant-ethnologist at the South Australian Museum. He was recognised by Norman Tindale, then curator of anthropology at the museum, for his work ensuring that the indigenous tools and artefacts were recognised as "the handiwork of the first Australians".

In 1957 he resigned from his position at the museum but continued as honorary associate in anthropology until 1968. He died on 14 May 1970 at Glenelg and was buried in St Jude's Anglican churchyard, Brighton.
