= Balaklava–Moonta railway line =

Former railway line in South Australia

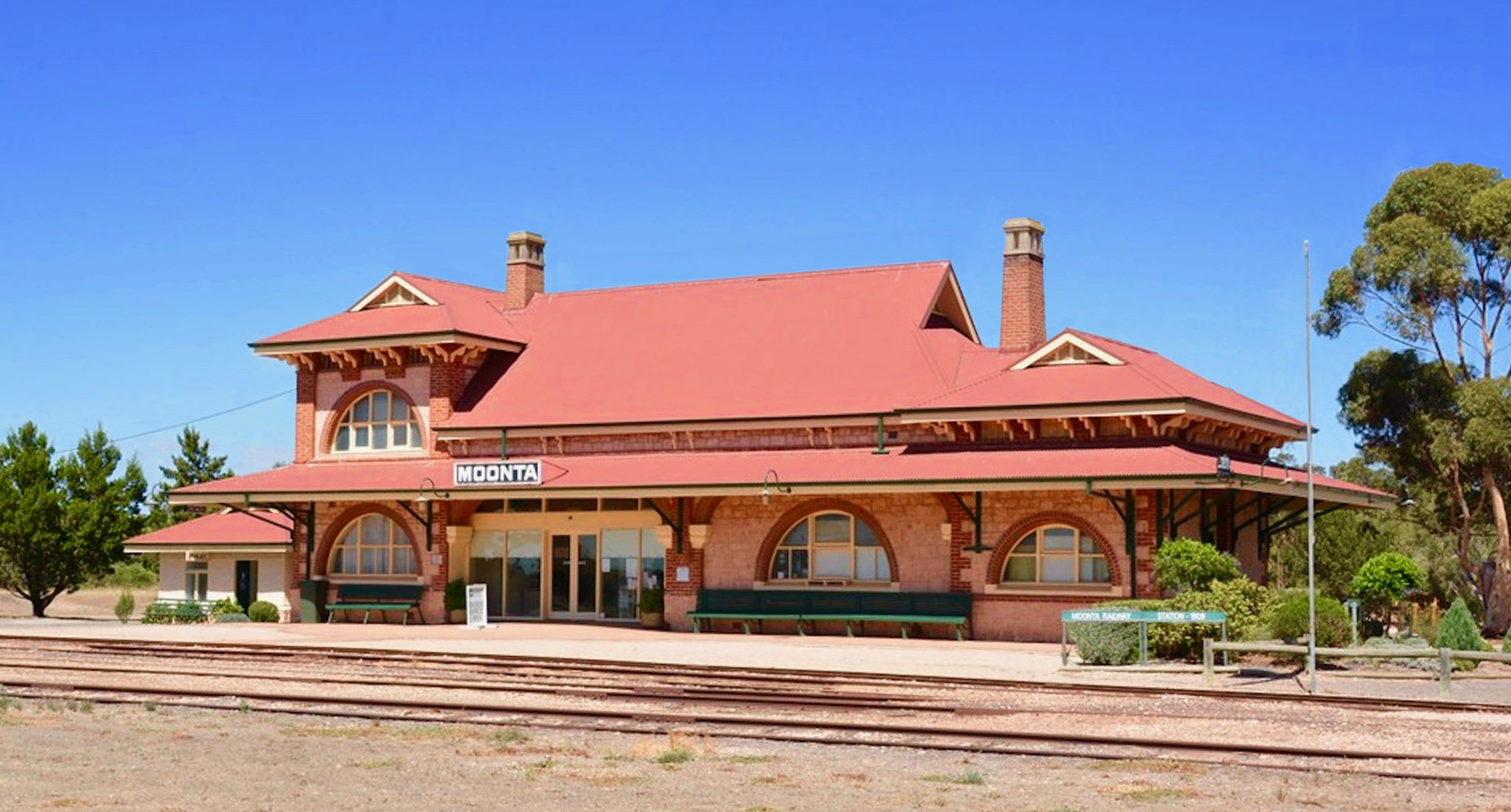
- Moonta railway station, the original terminus of the line, 2016

Overview
- Status: Closed and Removed
- Locale: Yorke Peninsula, South Australia
- Coordinates: 34°02′46.0″S 137°55′55.9″E
- Termini: Balaklava; Moonta
- Continues from: Hamley Bridge-Gladstone line

Service
- System: South Australian Railways
- Operator(s): South Australian Railways; Australian National

History
- Opened: Balaklava-Port Wakefield: 14 March 1876; Port Wakefield-Kadina: 9 October 1878; Kadina-Wallaroo: 15 January 1880; Wallaroo-Moonta: 2 November 1891
- Closed: Balaklava-Paskeville: 4 April 1984; Wallaroo-Moonta: 23 July 1984; Paskeville-Kadina:14 March 1990; Kadina-Wallaroo: 3 March 1993

Technical
- Line length: 109.4 km (68.0 mi)
- Track gauge: 1,435 mm (4 ft 8 1/2 in); 1,600 mm (5 ft 3 in)
- Old gauge: 1,067 mm (3 ft 6 in)

The Balaklava–Moonta railway line was a railway line on the South Australian Railways network. It ran across the top of the Yorke Peninsula.

== History ==
The first part to be built was a horse-drawn tramway between the port at Wallaroo and mines near Kadina in 1862, followed by mines near Moonta in 1866. The tramway was originally constructed as 5 ft 3 in (1,600 mm) gauge.

Another horse-drawn tramway was constructed to deliver grain from the plains east of Port Wakefield in the areas of Balaklava, Halbury and Hoyle's Plains (now Hoyleton) to that port. It opened in 1869. The section from Hoyleton to Balaklava eventually became part of the Hamley Bridge-Gladstone railway line when that line reached Gladstone in 1894.

The 3 ft 6 in (1,067 mm) gauge line from Port Wakefield reached a new junction with the Kadina–Brinkworth railway line at Kadina and opened on 9 October 1878. It continued to Wallaroo on a new track adjacent to the older broad gauge track. The line from Kadina to Barunga Gap had started construction from the Kadina end in 1877.

On 1 August 1927, the line was converted from 3 ft 6 in (1,067 mm) to 5 ft 3 in (1,600 mm) broad gauge. A junction at Kadina connected to the Kadina–Brinkworth railway line. The section from Kadina to Wallaroo was converted to dual broad and standard gauges on 2 December 1982 after the Adelaide–Port Augusta railway line was converted to standard gauge.

Following the conversion of the Adelaide-Port Augusta railway line to standard gauge in 1982, the broad gauge line from Balaklava to Paskeville was no longer required and closed on 4 April 1984. The Wallaroo to Moonta section was closed on 23 July 1984, and the broad gauge section from Kadina to Wallaroo was also closed on that date, but the standard gauge line remained open until 3 March 1993. The Paskeville to Kadina section was closed on 14 March 1990. After the closure of the railways, part of the line was used by the Lions Club of Yorke Peninsula Railway for heritage tourist services, but that operation ceased in 2009.

The line between Wallaroo and Kadina has since been pulled up and replaced with the Copper Coast Rail Trail and retail stores on both ends.
