= Adelaide–Port Augusta railway line =

Primary rail corridor in South Australia for northbound traffic

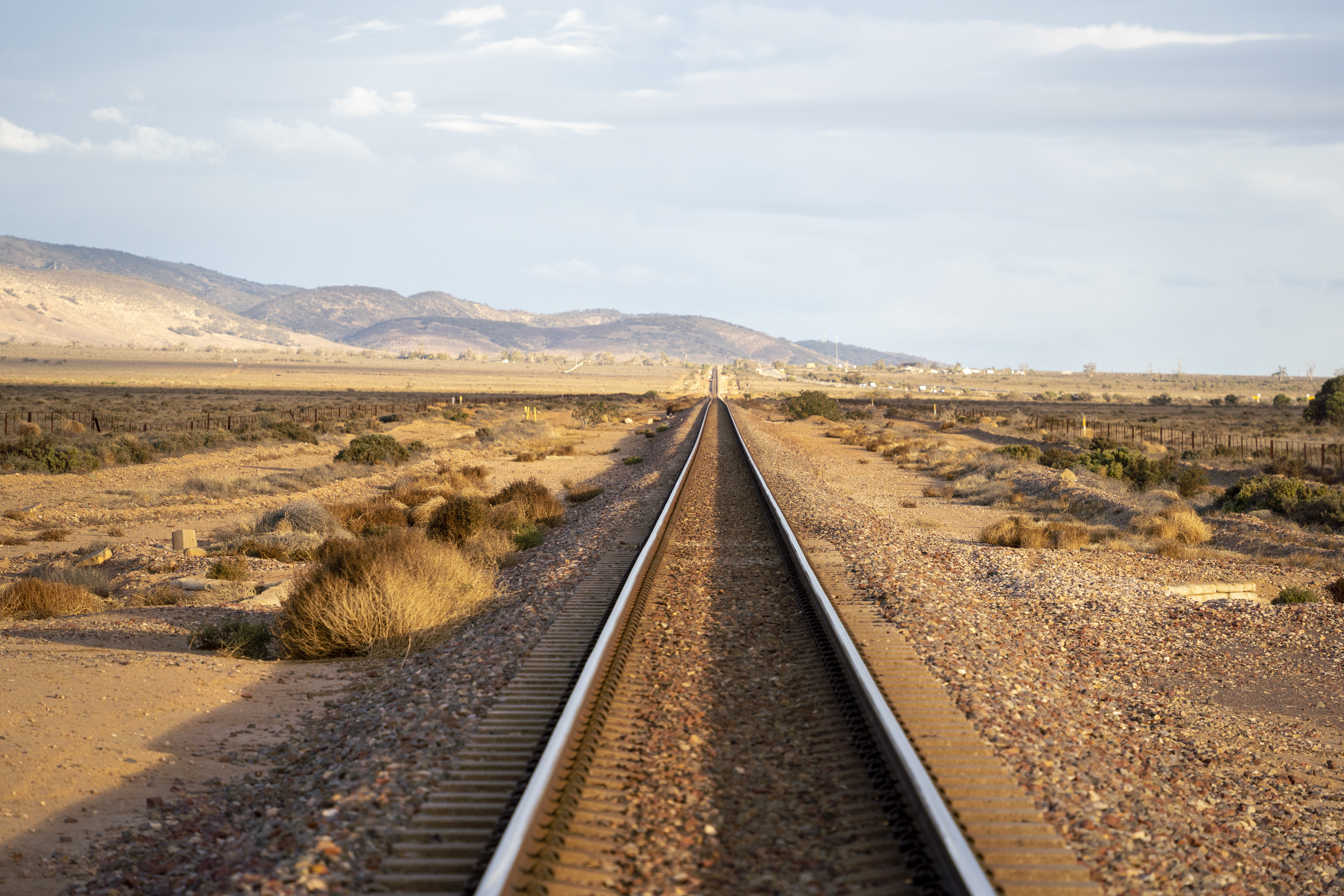
- A section of the Adelaide - Port Augusta railway line through Nectar Brook, SA in June, 2025

Overview
- Owner: Australian Rail Track Corporation
- Termini: Adelaide; Port Augusta
- Continues from: Adelaide-Wolseley line
- Continues as: Trans-Australian Railway

Service
- Services: The Ghan; Indian Pacific
- Operators: Freight: Aurizon; Pacific National; SCT Logistics; Bowmans Rail; Passenger: Journey Beyond

Technical
- Num of tracks: 1
- Track gauge: 1435 mm (4 ft 8 1/2 in)
- Old gauge: 1600 mm (5 ft 3 in)

The Adelaide–Port Augusta railway line is the main route for northbound rail traffic out of Adelaide, South Australia. The line, 315 kilometres (196 miles) long, is part of the Adelaide–Darwin rail corridor and the Sydney–Perth rail corridor. Before the route was converted to 1435 mm (4 ft 8 1/2 in) standard gauge in 1982, the two cities were connected by 1600 mm (5 ft 3 in) broad gauge and 1067 mm (3 ft 6 in) narrow gauge (until 1937); and broad and standard gauge (subsequently).

One Rail Australia, Pacific National and SCT Logistics operate freight services on the line; the sole passenger service is Journey Beyond's experiential tourism trains The Ghan and Indian Pacific.

SCT Logistics' Penfield intermodal terminal is connected to a siding south of the Northern Expressway and the Bolivar crossing loop.

== History ==
The government-owned South Australian Railways started to build the broad-gauge Salisbury–Long Plains line as a branch off the Main North line in 1915, completing it in April 1917. The line was extended from Long Plains to Redhill from 1917 to 1925, and again from Redhill to Port Pirie in 1937. In the latter year, the Commonwealth Railways extended its standard gauge Trans-Australian Railway line from Port Augusta south to Port Pirie.

In 1980, the Federal and State Governments entered an agreement to convert the line from Adelaide to standard gauge, albeit altered to meet the Trans-Australian Railway at Crystal Brook. This allowed Adelaide to become the last mainland state capital to join the standard gauge network. The line opened in 1982. It runs on the western side of the same corridor as the Gawler railway line from north of Salisbury railway station to the triangle near Adelaide Gaol, and continues on the western side of the metropolitan broad gauge tracks to Adelaide Parklands Terminal. The new line allowed Australian National to operate The Ghan, Indian Pacific and Trans-Australian through to Adelaide without passengers having to change trains. In July 1998, it became part of the Australian Rail Track Corporation network.

Until late 2017, this meant that the standard gauge trains had to cross the Outer Harbor railway line at-grade at Torrens Junction, north of the River Torrens. In 2017, this conflict was removed by lowering the suburban Outer Harbor line into a trench so it could pass under the standard gauge line. This would ease timetable and operational conflicts on both services.

== Crossing loops ==
The maximum length of trains on this line is 1.8 kilometres, and almost all crossing loops are of this length. East of Mile End the maximum train length is 1.5 kilometres, though this is starting to be increased to 1.8 kilometres also.

=== Mile End ===
The crossing loop at the Adelaide Parklands Terminal at Mile End is of length 1,658m.

=== Dry Creek ===
The first crossing loop north of Adelaide, of length 1,950m, is south of Dry Creek.

=== Bolivar ===
The Bolivar crossing loop is 1800 metres long, having been lengthened from 1200 metres in 2012, after the Taylors Road level crossing at the southern end was replaced by an overpass of the Northern Expressway. As a result, the overpass marks the approximate mid-point of the loop. (Note: The original crossing loop was between Taylors Road and King Road, Virginia.)

=== SCT Penfield ===
In 2007, it was proposed that an Intermodal Rail/Road facility be built in the Edinburgh Parks area. Accordingly, an area of rural/agricultural land in Penfield was rezoned in 2008.

In the 2010s, SCT Logistics and another company started to develop an intermodal hub. The new facilities and trackwork commenced construction on the north-east side of the line, south of the Northern Expressway and north of Heaslip Road and RAAF Base Edinburgh, in 2011–2012.

=== Two Wells ===
The next crossing loop, of length 1,817m, is at Two Wells - the loop is between Gawler Rd and Temby Rd.

=== Others ===
There are about a dozen other crossing loops north of Two Wells - refer to the infobox to the right.

=== Crystal Brook ===
Crystal Brook includes the triangle junction with the main line to Broken Hill and Sydney. Then there is a 968m crossing loop and siding with provision to load grain at the silos in the town. The tracks converge to single track to cross a bridge over the Crystal Brook, then split into double track for the 20 km to Coonamia. The western track is for northbound travel and the eastern track for southbound, except that there is a balloon loop for loading grain from the AWB silos which is accessed by proceeding a short distance north on the eastern track.

=== Coonamia ===
Coonamia "station" – in the past a provisional stopping place but since the early 2010s comprising only a nameboard – is the site of the "0 km" datum point for routes to Port Augusta, Broken Hill and Adelaide. At this point ARTC train controllers in Adelaide (who oversee operations between Broken Hill and Coonamia, and Coonamia southwards) hand over to controllers in Port Augusta (who oversee the line to Port Augusta and points west); the sign remains so that train crews can identify the change-over point. The location has a crossing loop 1638 m (1791 yds) long on the south side of the double mainline from Crystal Brook.

A further 2.25 km (1.4 mi) west is a triangle junction where the double track ends and from which single tracks go west to Port Pirie Yard and north to Port Augusta.

=== Port Germein ===
The 1960m crossing loop at Port Germein was supplemented by a 805m goods siding in 2015, operated by SCT Logistics. A short stub siding also leads off the crossing loop.

== See also ==
- Lochiel railway line
