= Bagot Well railway station =

Former railway station in Bagot Well, South Australia

Bagot Well

General information
- Location: Bagot Well Road, Bagot Well, South Australia
- Coordinates: 34°18′30″S 138°59′04″E
- Owner: South Australian Railways 1878 - 1978 Australian National 1978 - 1994
- Operator: South Australian Railways 1878 - 1968
- Line: Morgan line
- Distance: 91 kilometres from Adelaide

Construction
- Structure type: Ground

Other information
- Status: Demolished

History
- Opened: 23 September 1878
- Closed: December 1968

Services
Preceding station	Australian National Railways Commission	Following station
Kapunda towards Adelaide	Morgan railway line	Hansborough towards Morgan
Location

Bagot Well railway station was located on the Morgan railway line serving the South Australian locality of Bagot Well.

== History ==
Bagot Well railway station opened on 23 September 1878 when the line from Kapunda was extended to the shipping port at Morgan. It was named after Captain C.H Bagot who sank the well, which was re-served for public use in 1855. It was operated by South Australian Railways until March 1978 when it was transferred to Australian National. Passenger services ceased in December 1968 with the line closing in March 1994. There is no longer any trace of the station.
