= Freeling railway station =

Railway station in Freeling, South Australia

Freeling

General information
- Coordinates: 34.455090964983164°S 138.80760068445062°E
- Owner: South Australian Railways 1860 - 1978 Australian National 19878 - 1994
- Operator: South Australian Railways 1860- 1978 Australian National 1878 - 1968
- Line: Morgan railway line
- Distance: 68 kilometres from Adelaide

Construction
- Structure type: Ground

Other information
- Status: Closed

Services
Preceding station	Aurizon	Following station
Roseworthy towards Adelaide	Morgan railway line	Fords towards Morgan
Location

Freeling railway station was located on the Morgan railway line in the town of Freeling, South Australia.

== History ==
Freeling railway station opened on 13 August 1860 with the opening of the first section of the Morgan railway line to Kapunda. It was extended to Morgan on 23 September 1878. The station consisted of a shunting yard, goods crane, a house for the clerk, goods shed, waiting rooms and a station building with a similar design to the one that existed at Salisbury. An accident occurred at Freeling on 4 April 1891 when an elderly man named Richard Green was killed by a train at a crossing north of the station. Another accident occurred in 1913 when a train bound for Kapunda was washed away off the tracks at a nearby township of Fords. It was operated by South Australian Railways until 1978 when it was transferred to Australian National. The station closed to regular passenger use in December 1968. In 1997, the station and railway line were included in the transfer of Australian National's South Australian freight assets to Australian Southern Railroad (later known as One Rail Australia.) The last bulk grain trains operated on the line in circa January 1999 with the line being last used by a light engine movement on 21 May 2003 by Australian Railroad Group locomotive CK4. The station remnants and railway line were included in Aurizon's purchase of One Rail Australia in 2022.
