= Hampden railway station =

Former railway station in South Australia, Australia

Hampden

General information
- Location: Hampden Road, Hampden, South Australia
- Coordinates: 34.151080404971644°S 139.050653521493°E
- Owner: South Australian Railways 1878 - 1978 Australian National 1978 - 1994
- Operator: South Australian Railways 1878 - 1978
- Line: Morgan line
- Distance: 114 kilometres from Adelaide
- Platforms: 1
- Tracks: 1

Construction
- Structure type: Ground

Other information
- Status: Closed

History
- Opened: 23 September 1878
- Closed: 17 June 1970

Services
Preceding station	Australian National Railways Commission	Following station
Hansborough towards Adelaide	Morgan railway line	Eudunda towards Morgan
Location

Hampden railway station was located on the Morgan railway line. It served the town of Hampden, South Australia.

== History ==
Hampden railway station opened on opened on 23 September 1878 when the line from Kapunda was extended to the shipping port at Morgan. It was named after William Hampden Dutton who was the brother of F.S Dutton, Premiere and Agent-General of South Australia, 1865–1877. Hampden was one of the highest railway stations in the state. It was operated by South Australian Railways until March 1978 when it was transferred to Australian National. Passenger services ceased in December 1968 with the line closing in March 1994. The unused platform is the only evidence of the station remaining and a rail trail now runs from Eudunda to Hampden.
