= Bower railway station, South Australia =

Station in South Australia, 1878 to 1968

Bower

General information
- Owner: South Australian Railways 1870 - 1969
- Operator: South Australian Railways 1878 - 1968
- Line: Morgan line

Construction
- Structure type: Ground

Other information
- Status: Demolished

History
- Opened: 23 September 1878
- Closed: December 1968

Services
Preceding station	South Australian Railways	Following station
Sutherlands towards Adelaide	Morgan railway line	Mount Mary towards Morgan

Bower railway station was located on the Morgan railway line in the town of Bower.

== History ==
Bower railway Station opened on 23 September 1878 when the Kapunda railway line was extended to the shipping port at Morgan. It was named after Hon. David Bower, at one time Commissioner of Public Works of South Australia. Regular passenger services ceased in December 1968 with the traffic on the line dwindling. The line was closed in November 1969. There is no longer any trace of the station.
