= Hansborough railway station =

Station in South Australia, 1878 to 1968

Hansborough

General information
- Location: Hansborough Road, Hansborough, South Australia
- Coordinates: 34°14′56″S 139°01′14″E
- Owner: South Australian Railways 1878 - 1978 Australian National 1978 - 1994
- Operator: South Australian Railways 1878 - 1978
- Line: Morgan line
- Distance: 99 Kilometres from Adelaide

Construction
- Structure type: Ground

Other information
- Status: Demolished

History
- Opened: 23 September 1878
- Closed: December 1968

Services
Preceding station	Australian National Railways Commission	Following station
Bagot Well towards Adelaide	Morgan railway line	Hampden towards Morgan
Location

Hansborough railway station was located on the Morgan railway line in South Australia and served the locality of Hansborough.

== History ==
Hansborough railway station opened on opened on 23 September 1878 when the line from Kapunda was extended to the shipping port at Morgan. It was named after Francis Hansborough Dutton who founded Anlaby Station in 1840. It was operated by South Australian Railways until March 1978 when it was transferred to Australian National. Passenger services ceased in December 1968 with the line closing in March 1994. There is no longer any trace of the station.
