= Mount Mary railway station =

Station in South Australia, 1878 to 1968

Mount Mary

General information
- Owner: South Australian Railways 1870 - 1969
- Operator: South Australian Railways 1878 - 1968
- Line: Morgan line

Construction
- Structure type: Ground

Other information
- Status: Demolished

History
- Opened: 23 September 1878
- Closed: December 1968

Services
Preceding station	South Australian Railways	Following station
Bower towards Adelaide	Morgan railway line	Eba towards Morgan

Mount Mary railway station was located on the Morgan railway line in the town of Mount Mary in South Australia.

== History ==
Mount Mary Railway Station opened on 23 September 1878 when the Kapunda railway line was extended to the shipping port at Morgan. The station was named after a shepherd's hut that was originally on the site, and being on a rise was christened "Mound Mary." The present "Mount" is a corruption of "Mound." Mary was the sister of the person who first applied the name. The town itself was named after the station. Regular passenger services ceased in December 1968 with the traffic on the line dwindling. The railway line closed in November 1969 but Morgan residents requested that the line was at least preserved to Mount Mary. This was rejected with the line being removed not long after. There is no longer any trace of the station.
