= Kapunda railway station =

Former railway station in South Australia, Australia

Kapunda
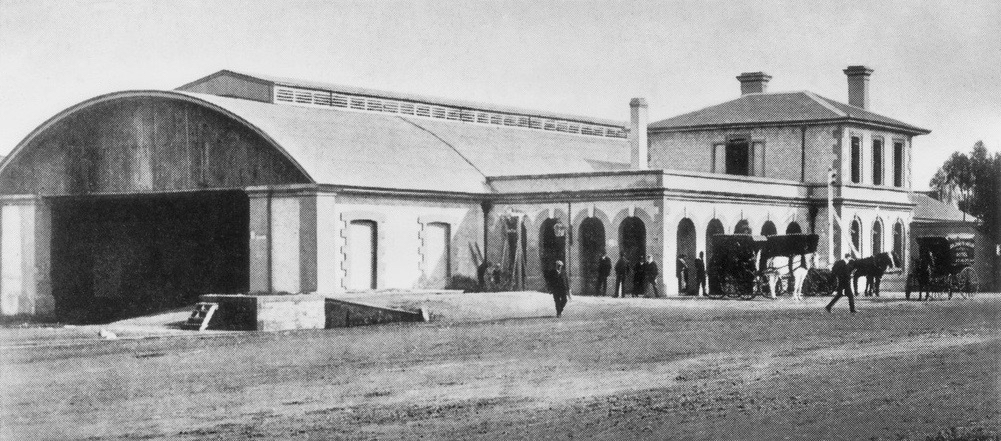
- Kapunda railway station (circa 1907)

General information
- Location: Railway Parade, Kapunda, South Australia
- Coordinates: 34.34262125603421°S 138.9090727739777°E
- Operator: Australian National
- Line: Morgan line
- Distance: 84.5 kilometres from Adelaide
- Platforms: 1
- Tracks: 1

Construction
- Structure type: Ground

Other information
- Status: Closed to traffic, repurposed as a luxury accommodation

History
- Opened: 13 August 1860
- Closed: 15 December 1968

Services
Preceding station	Aurizon	Following station
Fords towards Adelaide	Morgan railway line	Terminus
Preceding station	Australian National Railways Commission	Following station
Terminus	Morgan railway line	Bagot Well towards Morgan
Location

Kapunda railway station was located on the Morgan railway line. It served the town of Kapunda, South Australia.

== History ==
=== Opening ===
The station opened on 13 August 1860 when the railway line was opened from Gawler to serve the copper mining at Kapunda. The line was later extended to Morgan on 23 September 1878 Kapunda railway station consisted of a large building built of bluestone brought from the Kapunda quarries. The facilities at the station were made in the anticipation for large amounts of traffic until the mining ceased in 1879. The facilities consisted of a goods shed and railway station yards The station building itself was a two-storey station consisting of a ticket office. A barrel roofed building straddled along the station and the railway line but it was demolished.

=== Closure ===
The station closed to regular passengers on 15 December 1968, but some special train tours used the station afterwards. In 1978, the station and all associated infrastructure were included in the transfer of South Australian Railways non-metropolitan assets to Australian National. The last passenger train to use the station was a tour run by Train Tour Promotions to Robertstown on 20 May 1989. The line past Kapunda was closed on 11 March 1994 and eventually removed. Significant grain traffic used the remaining Kapunda line until 1996 when Australian National it's freight assets to Australian Southern Railroad (later known as One Rail Australia.) The last train movement left Kapunda on 21 May 2003, being a light engine movement with Australian Railroad Group locomotive CK4. In 2015, a short section of the line within Kapunda was repurposed as the Swann Path (also known as the Kapunda Rail Trail,) and it is planned to be extended to the southern end of the town in the future. The lease of the line and ownership of the rail infrastructure passed to Aurizon in 2022, following their purchase of One Rail Australia (the final successor of Australian Southern Railroad).

The railway station was restored into a hotel accommodation in 2023 with a major refurbishment and various facilities like bedrooms, living rooms and dining rooms.
