= Eudunda railway station =

Railway station in Eudunda, South Australia

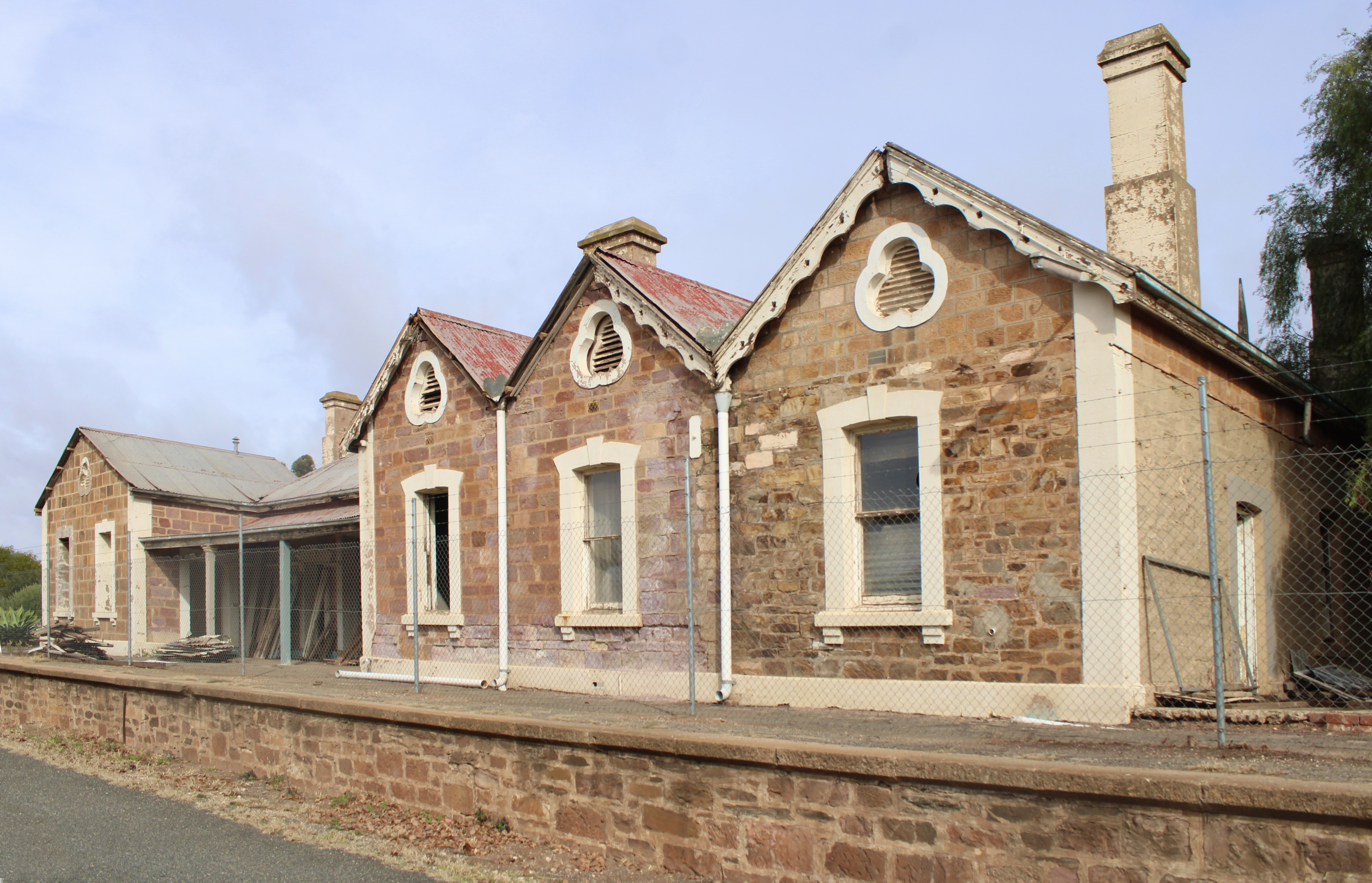
- Eudunda railway station building in 2021

General information
- Location: Railway Parade, Eudunda; Australia
- Coordinates: 34°10′30″S 139°05′07″E
- Elevation: 409 m (1,342 ft)
- Operator: South Australian Railways 1860–1978; Australian National Railways Commission 1978–1994
- Lines: Morgan line Robertstown line
- Distance: 111 kilometres (69 miles) from Adelaide railway station
- Platforms: 1
- Tracks: 3

Construction
- Structure type: Ground

Other information
- Status: Closed; now in private ownership

History
- Opened: 23 September 1878
- Closed: 15 December 1968 (passenger); 11 March 1994 (freight)

Services
Preceding station	Australian National Railways Commission	Following station
Hampden towards Adelaide	Morgan railway line	Sutherlands towards Morgan
Terminus	Robertstown railway line	Point Pass towards Robertstown
Location

Eudunda railway station was located at the junction of the Morgan railway line and the Robertstown railway line. Situated in the town of Eudunda, South Australia, it was 111 kilometres (69 miles) from Adelaide by rail.

== History ==
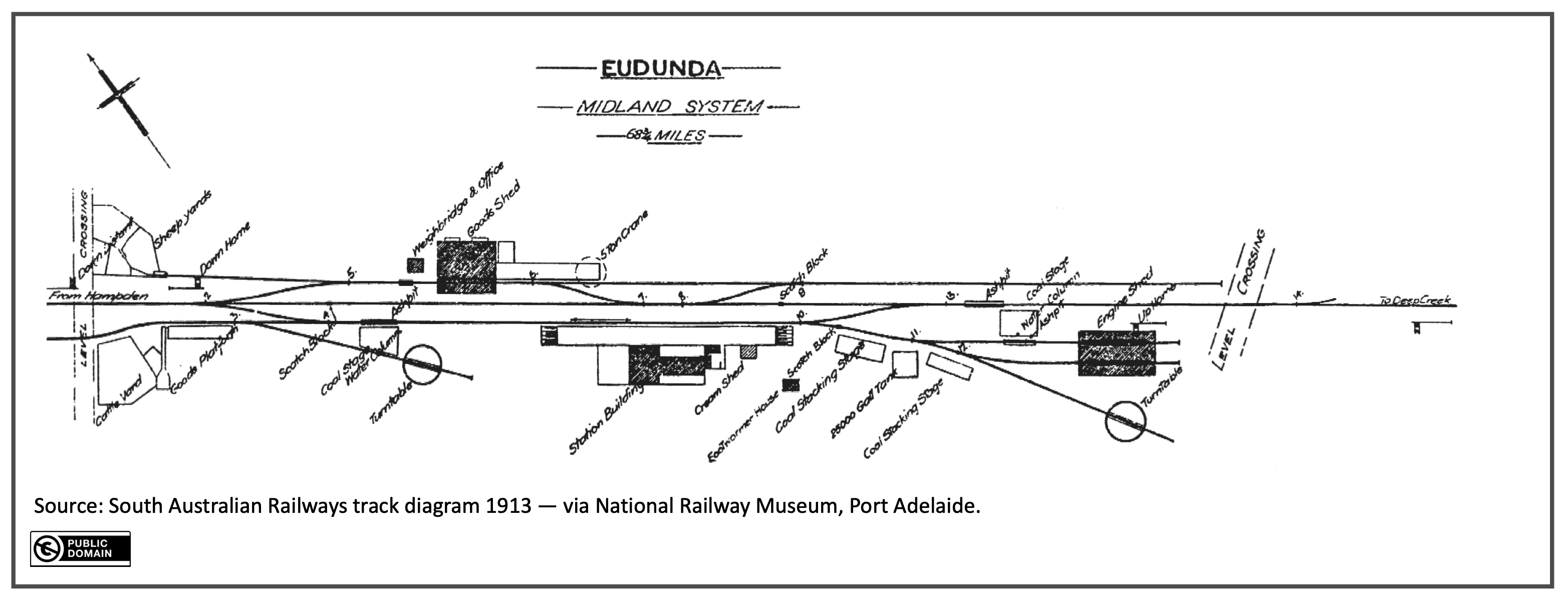
Eudunda station track layout, 1913

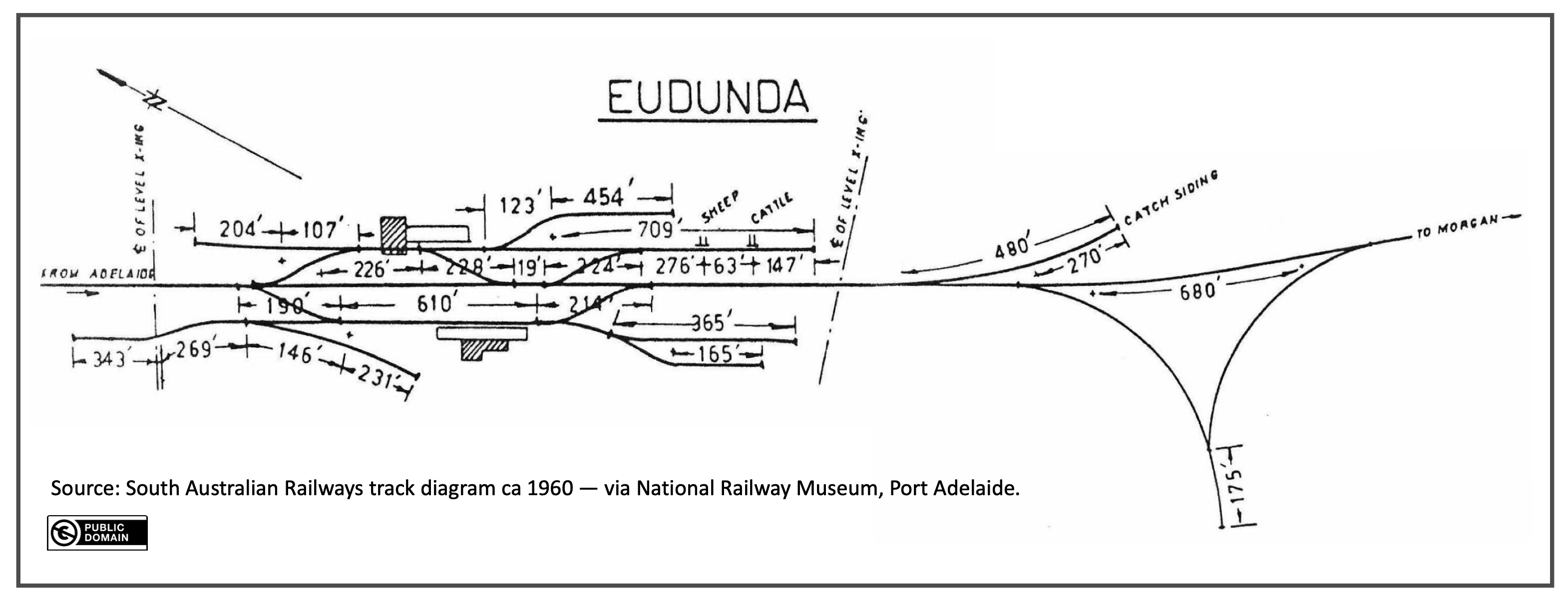
Eudunda station track layout, about 1960

=== Opening ===
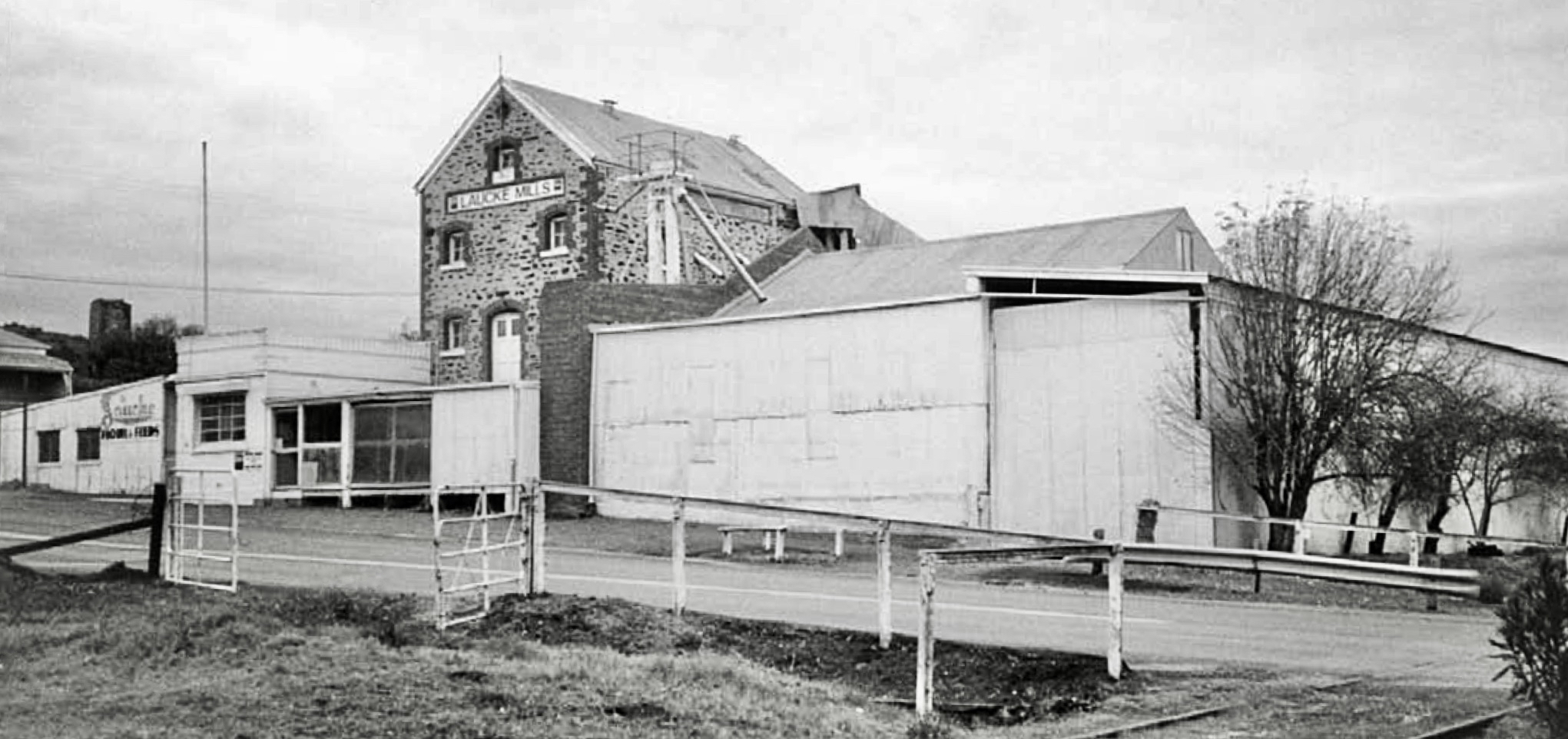
Built in 1879 by Edwin Davey, a flour miller from Angaston, the mill was served by a railway siding. Its last owner, Laucke Milling Co. Ltd, had flour mills at Strathalbyn, Angaston and Stockport when it bought the mill in the early 1950s; it was closed in 1990.

Eudunda railway station opened on 23 September 1878 as part of the final extension of the Northern Railway from the existing terminus at Kapunda. The extension helped to provide a connection to the River Murray. Facilities included a stone station building on a passenger platform and a goods shed. Infrastructure included a water column and water tank for steam locomotives, drawn from a large dam that held nearly 4 million gallons of water. The dam burst in 1903, 1913, and 1915 due to heavy weather events. The most serious of these was in 1913, when a large thunderstorm caused the town to flood; the dam burst and floodwaters could not be stopped early. Goods trains often hauled grain and livestock from the station; in later years grain would become the sole commodity. Eudunda became a junction station on 9 December 1914, when the railway line to Robertstown was opened. The junction was located east of the town. During the 1950s-1960s, grain silos were provided at the station yard, allowing bulk handing of grain for goods trains without the need for bagging.

=== Closure ===
The station closed for regular passenger traffic on 15 December 1968; some special charter trains used the station afterwards. It ceased to be a junction station on 2 November 1969 with the closure of the line between Eudunda and Morgan. In 1978, the station and all associated infrastructure were included in the transfer of South Australian Railways non-metropolitan assets to the Australian National Railways Commission. The last passenger train to use the station was a tour to Robertstown run by Train Tour Promotions on 20 May 1989. After the closure of the Robertstown line on 25 September 1990, Eudunda became the terminus. On 11 March 1994, the Kapunda–Eudunda section of the line was closed after the last grain train ran from Eudunda; it was pulled up the following year. In 2003, the land occupied by the railway yard was transferred to the Regional Council of Goyder.

=== Present day ===
A scaled-down two-dimensional replica of a steam locomotive is next to the station building, which is privately owned and fenced off. The water tower and water column at the southern end of the yard are intact. Most of the non-grain goods infrastructure has been demolished, except for the base of the goods crane. The grain silos were painted in 2022 by artist Sam Brooks, becoming a part of the Australian Silo Art Trail. The project, known as "Eudunda: The Storytime Silos", features art based on local author Colin Thiele's book, The sun on the stubble, and on a Ngadjuri story book made in collaboration with local Ngadjuri elder, Quentin Aeguis.

The ganger's shed was relocated to the National Railway Museum, Port Adelaide about 1990. In 2024, a section car donated to the Eudunda community was placed on the weighbridge after being cosmetically restored.
