= Sutherlands railway station =

Station in South Australia, 1878 to 1968

Sutherlands

General information
- Location: Railway Terrace, Sutherlands, South Australia
- Owner: South Australian Railways 1878–1969
- Operator: South Australian Railways 1878–1968
- Line: Morgan line

Construction
- Structure type: On platform

Other information
- Status: Demolished

History
- Opened: 23 September 1878
- Closed: December 1968

Services
Preceding station	South Australian Railways	Following station
Eudunda towards Adelaide	Morgan railway line	Bower towards Morgan

Sutherlands railway station was located on the Morgan railway line in the rural locality of Sutherlands, South Australia.

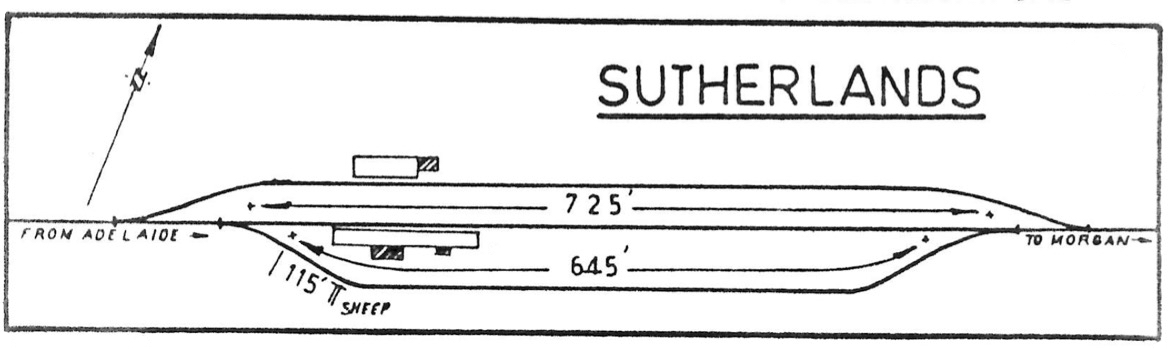
Track layout diagram

The station opened on 23 September 1878, when the Kapunda railway line was extended to the River Murray shipping port at Morgan. It was named after Mr William Sutherland, who was responsible for the opening of the siding for the purpose of wood trade. Regular passenger services ceased in December 1968 because of dwindling traffic on the line. The line was closed in November 1969. No traces of the station remain.

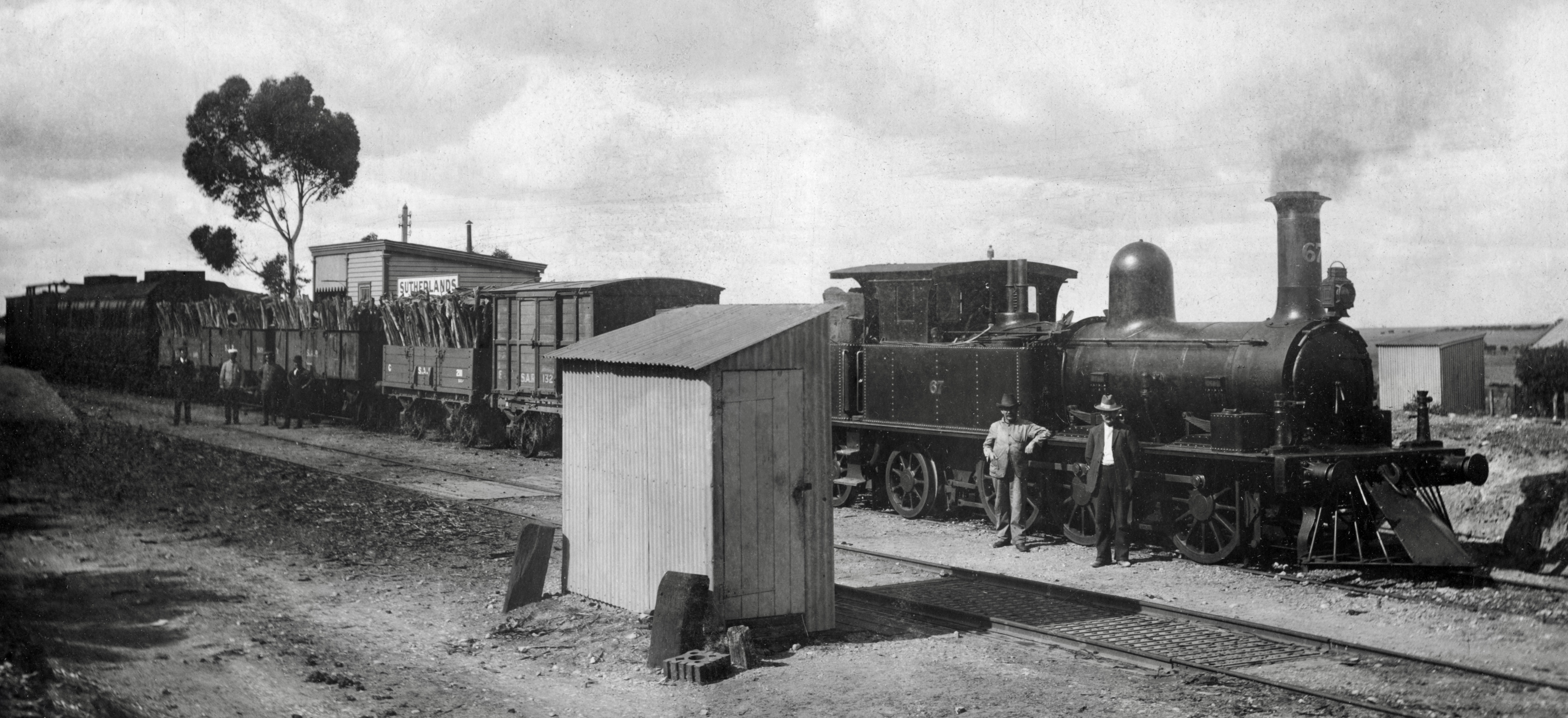
About 1906, when the road network was undeveloped in rural South Australia and trains were important in conveying freight and passengers, a mixed train hauled by a South Australian Railways K class (broad gauge) locomotive is at Sutherlands station. A weighbridge and scales shed in the foreground allowed the weight of wagonloads, on which freight charges were based, to be measured.
