= Fords railway station =

Former railway station in South Australia, Australia

Fords

General information
- Location: Fords Road, Fords, South Australia
- Coordinates: 34.388338959994314°S 138.87355604666854°E
- Operator: Australian National
- Line: Morgan line
- Distance: 79 kilometres from Adelaide
- Platforms: 1
- Tracks: 1

Construction
- Structure type: Ground

Other information
- Status: Closed

History
- Closed: December 1968

Services
Preceding station	Aurizon	Following station
Freeling towards Adelaide	Morgan railway line	Kapunda towards Morgan
Location

Fords railway station was located on the Morgan railway line. It served the locality of Fords, South Australia.

== History ==
The first section of the line opened from Gawler to the copper mining at Kapunda, opened on 13 August 1860. It was extended to Morgan on 23 September 1878 to provide a more efficient freight and passenger connection between the Murray paddle steamers and both the city of Adelaide and Port Adelaide for ocean transport. It is unclear when Fords railway station opened. It was named after a local farmer, John Fords, who held the land in that locality. A goods shed was erected in 1870.

=== Embankment washaway ===
On 13 February 1913, a goods train traveling to Kapunda derailed on a high embankment near Fords station. The line gave way just as the train crossed it, with all but the last few carriages derailed off the tracks. The train driver, William Critchley, was washed away into the floods.

=== Closure ===
The station closed to regular passenger use in December 1968 but some special train tours used the station afterwards. In 1978, the station and all associated infrastructure were included in the transfer of South Australian Railways non-metropolitan assets to Australian National. The last passenger train to use the station was a tour run by Train Tour Promotions to Robertstown on 20 May 1989. In 1997, the station and railway line were included in the transfer of Australian National's South Australian freight assets to Australian Southern Railroad (later known as One Rail Australia.) The last bulk grain trains operated on the line in circa January 1999 with the line being last used by a light engine movement on 21 May 2003 by Australian Railroad Group locomotive CK4. The station remnants and railway line were included in Aurizon's purchase of One Rail Australia in 2022.

=== Present day ===
The goods shed and platform remain but have fallen into a state of disrepair. The station is now privately owned.
