= Eba railway station =

Station in South Australia, 1878 to 1968

Eba
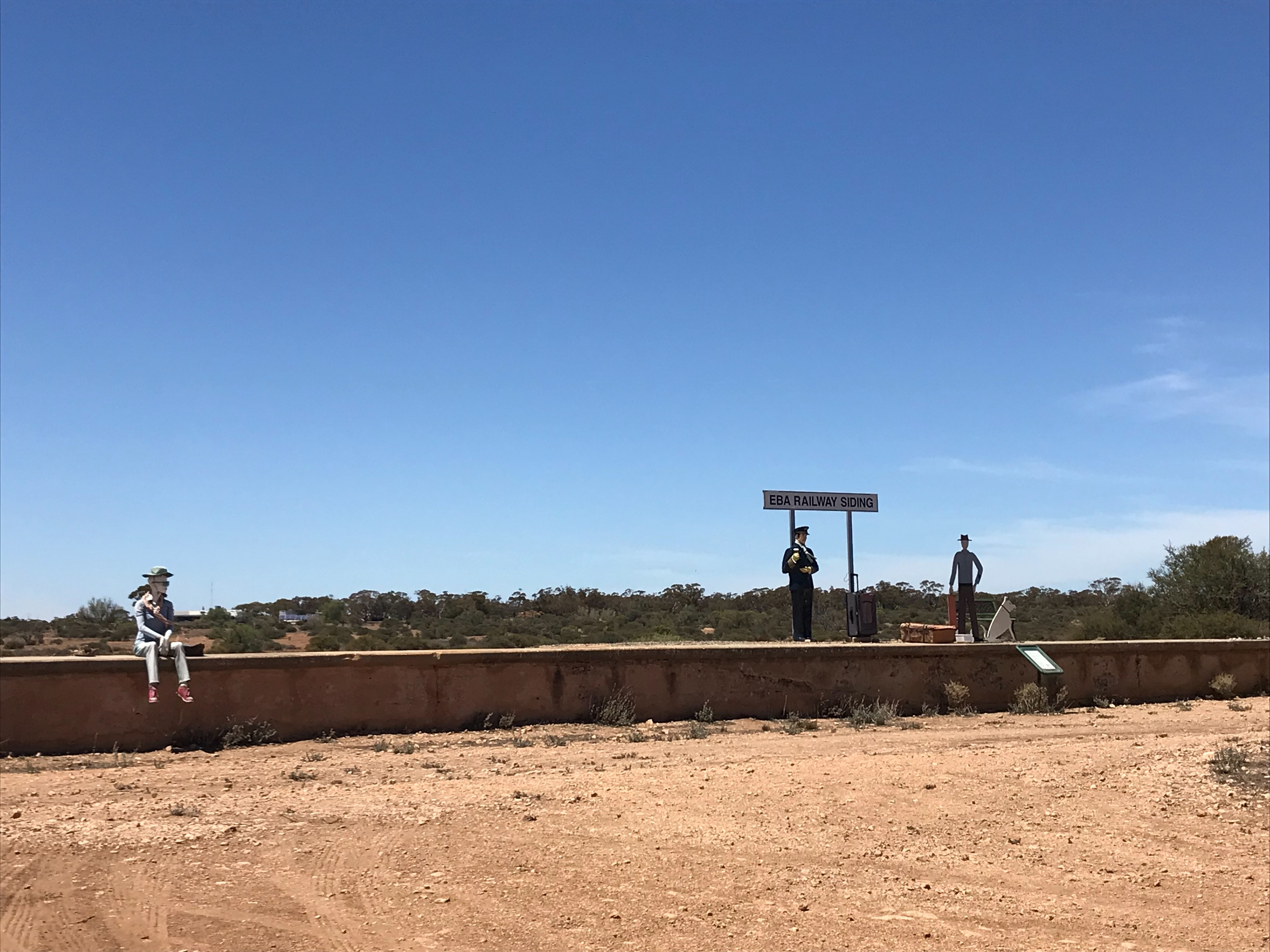

General information
- Coordinates: 34°04′05″S 139°34′38″E
- Owner: South Australian Railways 1878 - 1969
- Operator: South Australian Railways 1878 - 1968
- Line: Morgan line
- Distance: 159 Kilometres from Adelaide

Construction
- Structure type: Ground

Other information
- Status: Closed, mostly demolished

History
- Opened: 23 September 1878
- Closed: December 1968

Services
Preceding station	South Australian Railways	Following station
Mount Mary towards Adelaide	Morgan railway line	Morgan Terminus
Location

Eba railway station was located on the Morgan railway line in the South Australian locality of Eba.

== History ==
Eba railway station opened on 23 September 1878 when the line from Kapunda was extended to the shipping port at Morgan. A railway siding was also provided. It was named after the friend of Richard MacDonnell, who was the governor of South Australia at that time. Passenger services ended in December 1968 with the traffic on the line dwindling. The railway line finally closed in November 1969 with the line being dismantled. The platform was kept and turned into a highway stop.
