= Hogwash Bend Conservation Park =

Protected area in South Australia

- IUCN category III (natural monument or feature)
- Location within South Australia
- Location: South Australia, Cadell and Taylorville
- Nearest city: Cadell
- Coordinates: 34°04′58″S 139°49′58″E
- Area: 4.02 km^{2} (1.55 sq mi)
- Established: 6 September 2012
- Governing body: Department for Environment and Water

Hogwash Bend Conservation Park is a protected area located in the Australian state of South Australia in the Riverland in the localities of Cadell and Taylorville in the state's east about 148 kilometres (92 mi) north-east of the state capital of Adelaide and about 8 kilometres (5.0 mi) east of the town of Cadell.

The conservation park consists of three following parcels of land located in two separate localities – Sections 275 & 412 and Allotment 1 of Deposited Plan 84790 in the cadastral unit of the Hundred of Cadell which are in Cadell on the south side of the Murray River and Section 88 in the Hundred of Stuart which is in Taylorville on the north side of the river. The land was purchased by the Australian and South Australian governments for the purpose of providing habitat for breeding pairs of the eastern subspecies of the Regent Parrot which is listed as a vulnerable species under the Australian Environment Protection and Biodiversity Conservation Act 1999. The conservation park was named after Hogwash Bend, a bend on the southern side of the river that it occupies. It was proclaimed under the National Parks and Wildlife Act 1972 on 6 September 2012.

As of 2016, it covered an area of 4.02 square kilometres (1.55 sq mi).

In 2011, the conservation park was described in the South Australian House of Assembly by Paul Caica, the then Minister for Environment and Conservation as follows:

… The recently acquired Hogwash Bend site supports mature river red gums, nesting sites for regent parrots, and a large area of mallee woodland in close proximity, providing the essential feeding requirements for the breeding parrots. Eastern regent parrots require feeding grounds to be located within 20 kilometres of their nesting colonies… In addition to the eastern regent parrot, I can inform members that the property protects habitat supporting other threatened species, including the brush-tailed possum, darter, little friarbird, Gilbert's Whistler, Australian bustard and the carpet python.

The conservation park is classified as an IUCN Category III protected area.

== See also ==
- Protected areas of South Australia
