= Cadell Training Centre =

Prison in Cadell, Australia

Coordinates: 34°3′25″S 139°45′27″E

- Interactive map of Cadell Training Centre
- Location: Cadell, South Australia
- Security class: Minimum Security
- Capacity: 206
- Opened: 1960
- Managed by: Department for Correctional Services

Notable prisoners
- Henry Keogh

Cadell Training Centre is an Australian minimum security prison located in Cadell, South Australia, approximately 180 km north-east of Adelaide and 10 km from the town of Morgan. Named for the town of Cadell which is itself named after Captain Francis Cadell, who was the navigator on Charles Sturt’s successful exploration of the Murray River. The prison was officially opened on Tuesday 31 May 1960 by the Chief Secretary of South Australia, the Honourable Sir Lyell McEwin.

The Cadell Training Centre is a publicly run institution situated on approximately 1,600 hectares (4,000 acres) of land in a rural environment with a focus on Dairy farming, citrus and olives.

Originally built to hold 140 low security inmates who have been sentenced to terms of imprisonment of at least six months or longer it has since been expanded to hold 167 prisoners, then further expanded in 2014 and 2015 to 193 and 206 respectively. Accommodation for inmates consists of a cellblock, a dormitory and cottages. The cottages are rated drug-free and house 50% of the prison population. The centre does not have a secure perimeter fence with prisoners remaining under their own trust.

== Programs offered ==
The centre lists its main function as having a major restorative justice focus. This includes programs to help inmates obtain driving licences for various commercial vehicles and certificates in Horticulture, dairy production and Commercial Cookery. Prisoners also perform community service work in neighbouring towns and the Cadell Fire Brigade is operated by prisoners and staff with the vehicles housed within the prison grounds.

The centre also operates a specialist program targeting young men who have had limited exposure to the adult prison system, and another program that targets young offenders with drug and alcohol problems. Cadell also receives prisoners who are nearing the end of their sentences from high security prisons that are deemed suitable. Prisoners must be rated by the Department for Correctional Services as Low Security (approximately 18% of the South Australia Prisoner population) to be eligible to serve their sentence at Cadell.
