= Robertstown railway line =

Former railway line in South Australia

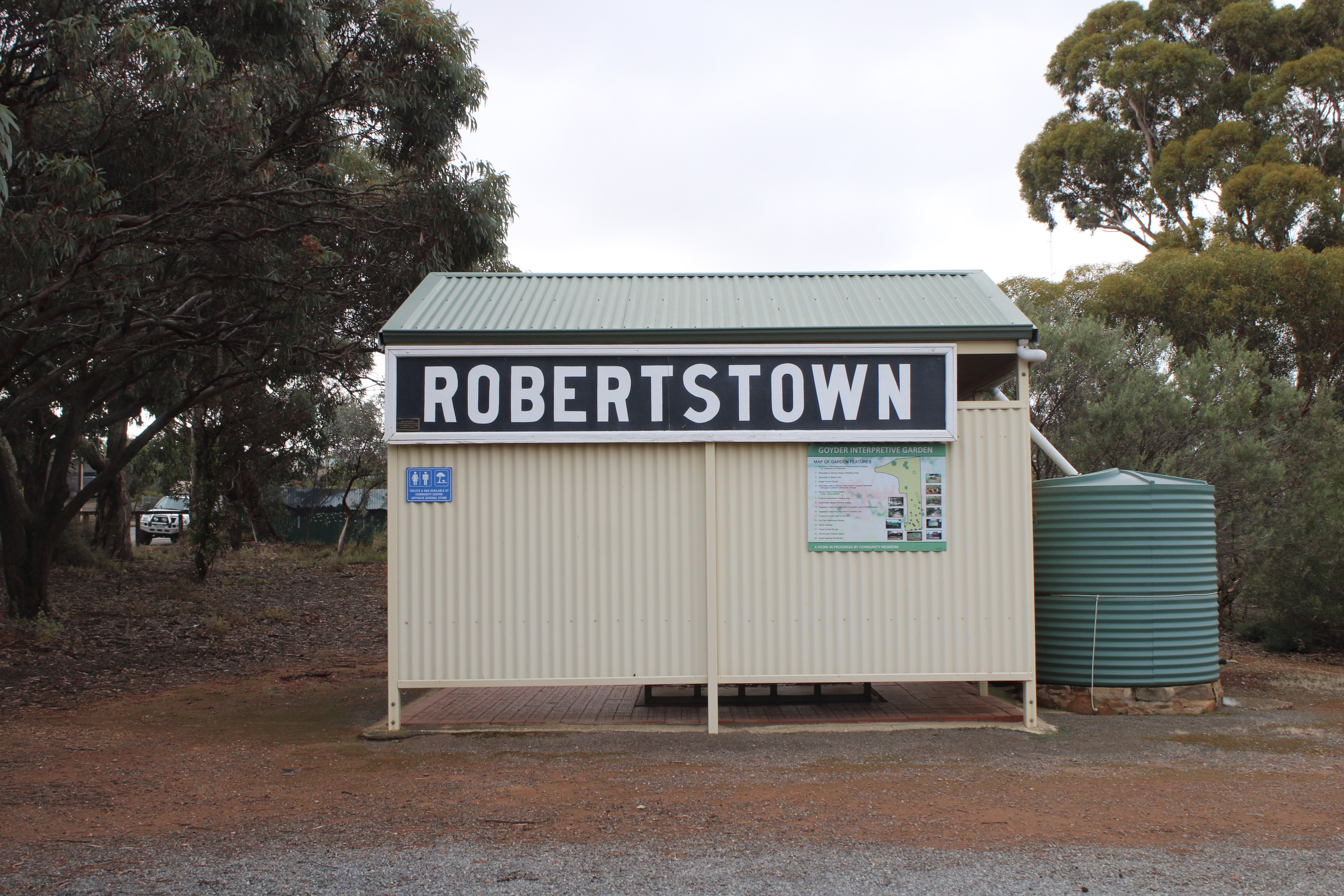
- Robertstown railway station sign

Overview
- Status: Closed & removed
- Termini: Eudunda; Robertstown
- Continues from: Morgan line

Service
- System: South Australian Railways
- Operator(s): South Australian Railways; Australian National

History
- Opened: 9 December 1914
- Closed: 25 September 1990

Technical
- Line length: 21.6 km (13.4 mi)
- Track gauge: 1,600 mm (5 ft 3 in)

The Robertstown railway line was a railway line on the South Australian Railways network. It opened on 9 December 1914 from a junction with the Morgan line at Eudunda running 21.6 kilometres via Point Pass to Robertstown.

== History ==
The line was used by both passenger and freight trains, though the regular passenger service on the line was withdrawn on 23 September 1962. Grain trains serving the Robertstown silos were among the last traffic to use the line in its later years. Train Tour Promotions ran the last passenger train using locomotive 804 on 20 May 1989, with the last freight train being a grain train on 21 February 1990. The line formally closed on 25 September 1990. The line was lifted in the years following, with all stations on the line being demolished. The only significant railway remnants left are the former Robertstown station sign and the former goods crane. The goods crane has collapsed, though there are plans to restore it.
