= Point Pass railway station =

Railway station in Point Pass, Australia

Point Pass
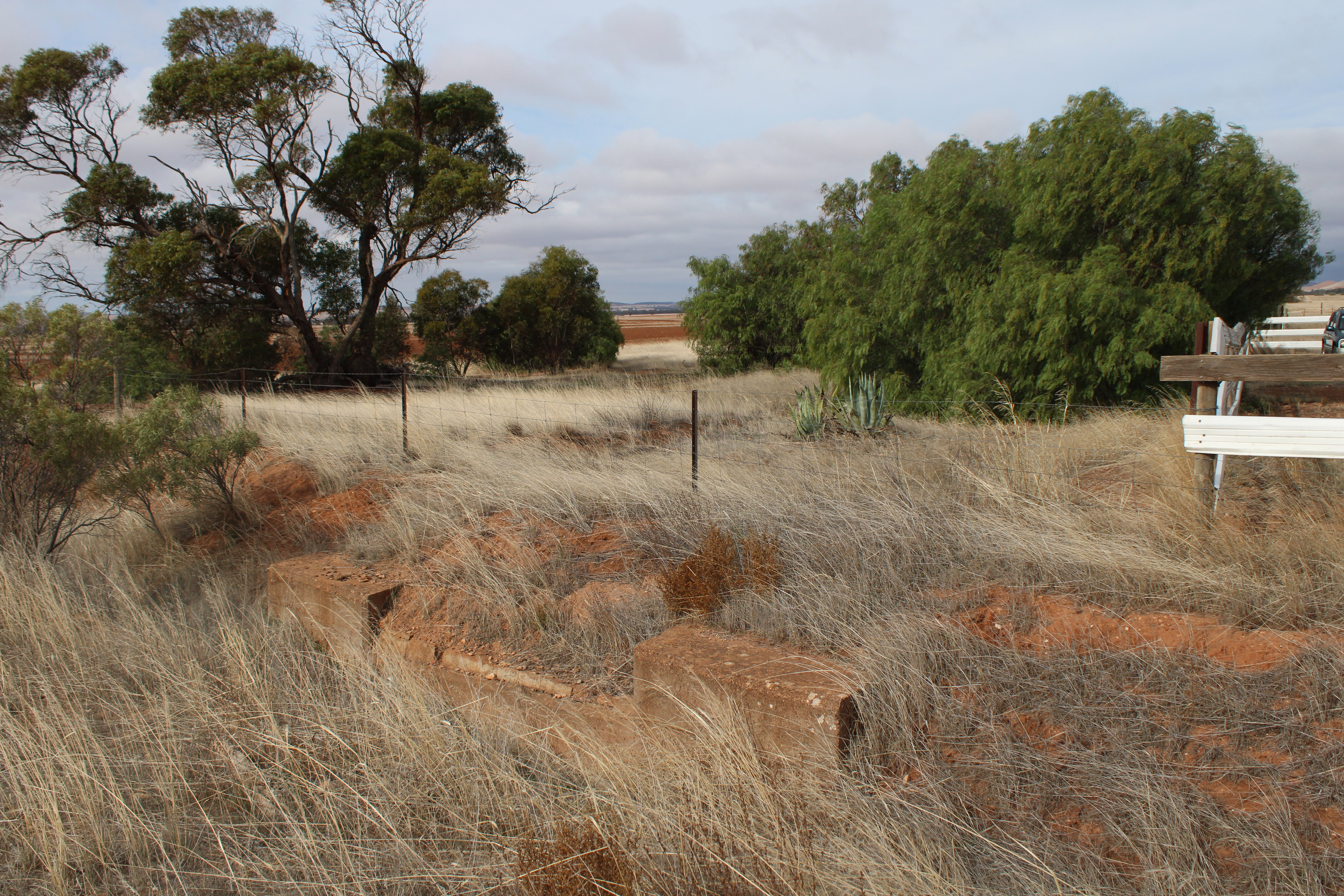
- Point Pass rail corridor viewed from Railway Terrace, looking south towards the former station site.

General information
- Coordinates: 34.08°S 139.05°E
- System: Former Australian National regional rail
- Operator: South Australian Railways 1914–1975; Australian National 1975–1990
- Line: Robertstown railway line
- Distance: 123 kilometres from Adelaide
- Platforms: 1

Construction
- Structure type: Ground

Other information
- Status: Closed and demolished

History
- Opened: 9 December 1914; 111 years ago
- Closed: 23 September 1962; 63 years ago

Services
Preceding station	Australian National Railways Commission	Following station
Eudunda towards Adelaide	Robertstown railway line	Robertstown Terminus
Location

Point Pass was a station on the Robertstown railway line serving the South Australian Mid North town of Point Pass.

== History ==
Point Pass railway station opened on 9 December 1914 after a railway line to Robertstown was built from Eudunda on the Morgan railway line, going through Point Pass on the way. Point Pass served both passengers and freight.

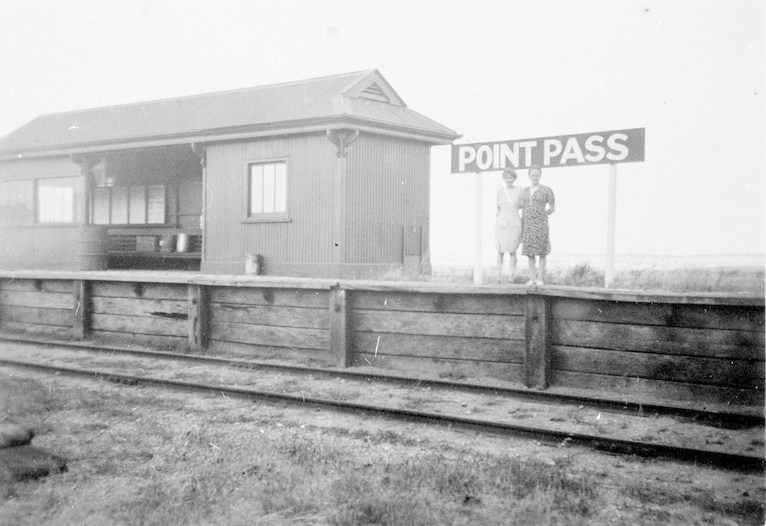
Point Pass Railway Station about 1930. Two women stand on the platform posing for the camera.

The station closed as regular passenger services ceased on 23 September 1962. The station was demolished soon after, but the station sign was left at the site. With traffic on the line dwindling, the last passenger train to pass the station was run by Train Tour Promotions using locomotive 804 to farewell the line on 20 May 1989. Less than a year later, the final train to pass the station, a grain train departed Robertstown on 21 February 1990. AN formally closed the line on 25 February 1990.

=== Present day ===
No remains are left at the station site, having been demolished after the cessation of passenger services and the station sign being removed in later years.
