= Morphetts Flat, South Australia =

Morphetts Flat South Australia
- Coordinates: 34.0473°S 139.6821°E
- Population: 9 (SAL 2021)
- Postcode(s): 5320
- Location: 3 km (2 mi) south of Morgan
- LGA(s): Mid Murray Council
- State electorate(s): Chaffey
- Federal division(s): Barker
Localities around Morphetts Flat:
Morgan	Beaumonts
	Morphetts Flat	Cadell
	Brenda Park

Morphetts Flat is a locality on the right bank of the Murray River downstream of Morgan in South Australia. It lies on low flat land along the inside of a long right-hand bend in the river. The locality is dominated by shack sites and houseboats. It includes a slipway used for servicing and maintenance of houseboats. Evidence that the locality is used for holiday accommodation is shown in the 2016 census when there were only 3 residents (all female) but 31 private dwellings recorded.
