= Cadell, South Australia =

Cadell South Australia
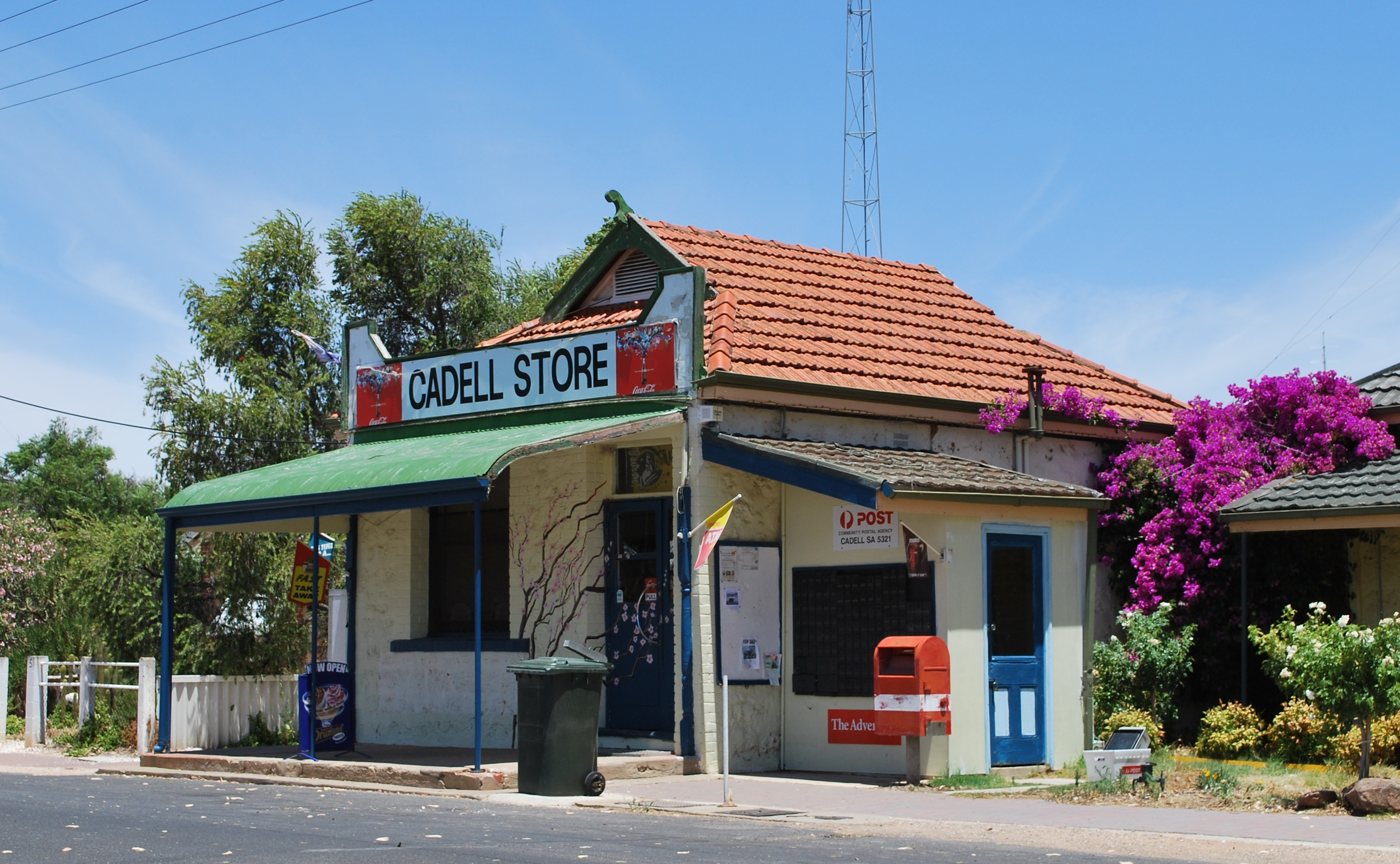
- Store and post office

- Coordinates: 34°02′24″S 139°45′40″E
- Population: 547 (SAL 2021)
- Established: 29 July 1920 (town); 27 March 2003 (locality)
- Location: 192 km (119 mi) from Adelaide
- LGA(s): Mid Murray Council
- County: Albert
- State electorate(s): Chaffey
- Federal division(s): Barker
Localities around Cadell:
| Morgan | Stuart; Cadell Lagoon; Taylorville | Taylorville |
| Morgan; North West Bend; Beaumonts; Morphetts Flat; Brenda Park; Morgan | Cadell | Taylorville; Qualco; Sunlands |
| Morgan | Murbko; Stockyard Flat; Sunlands | Sunlands |
- Footnotes: Adjoining localities

Cadell is a town and locality situated near the north western edge of South Australia's Riverland on the inside of the large southward bend in the Murray River. It is named after Captain Francis Cadell, a blackbirder as well as a pioneer of steam-powered navigation on the Murray River. The town of Cadell was surveyed in 1919 and named in 1920. It is slightly upstream of the earlier failed village settlement of New Era, however what is now the Cadell Irrigation Area is the same as was previously the New Era irrigation area.

== Land Use ==
Cadell is a quiet rural township in the middle of a citrus and wine grape growing area. Most of the major services (medical, pharmacy, shopping, police, mechanical, etc.) are provided at nearby Waikerie. Limited services are also available at Morgan. Crossing of the Murray River is provided by a free government ferry service. It is also home to a low security prison for men, the Cadell Training Centre.

The Morgan Conservation Park is located at the locality's west end while part of the Hogwash Bend Conservation Park is located at its eastern end.

== See also ==
- List of crossings of the Murray River
