= Robertstown railway station =

Railway station in Robertstown, Australia

Robertstown
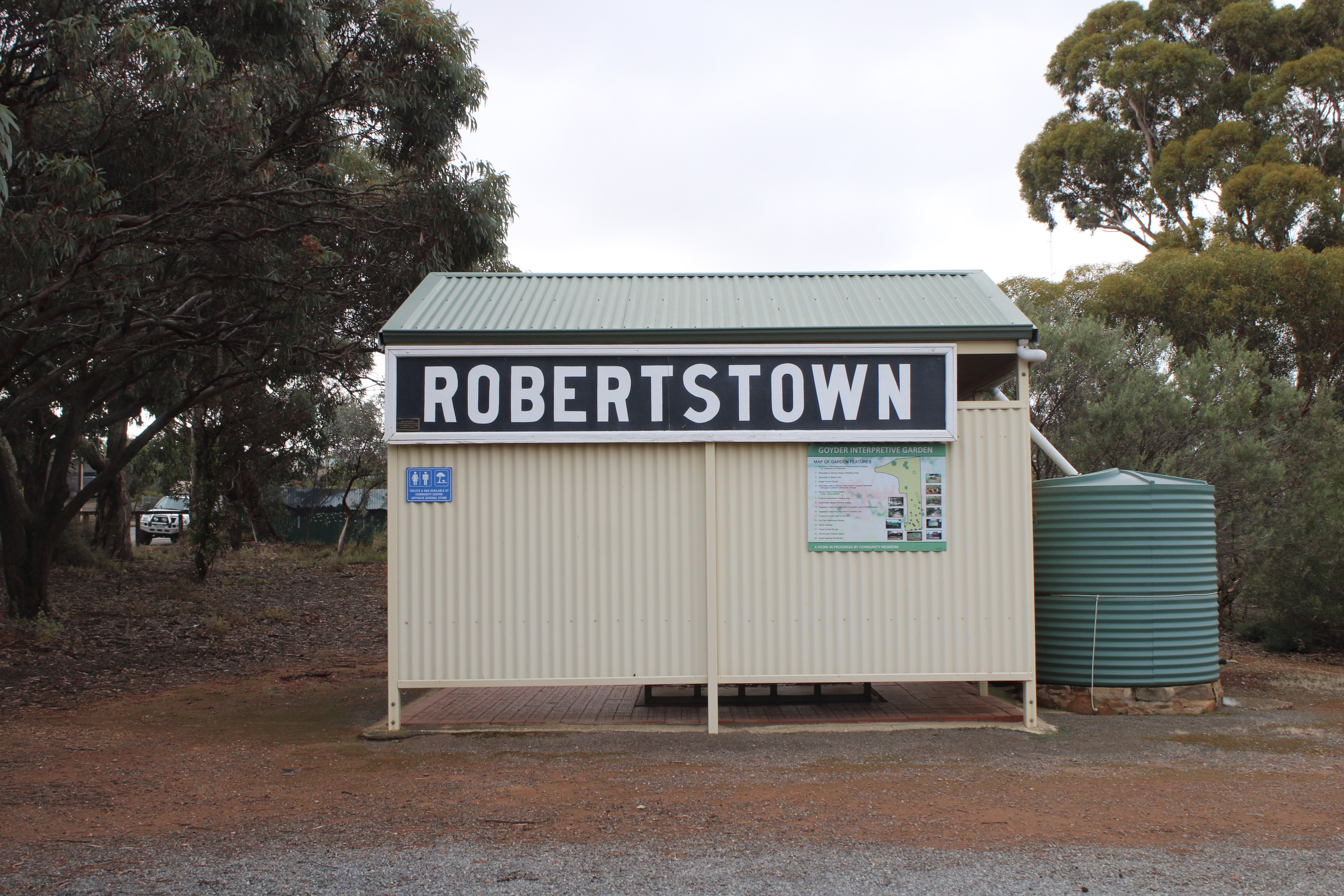
- The original Robertstown station sign, displayed in the Goyder Interpretive Gardens located in the former station yard in June 2021.

General information
- Coordinates: 33.99°S 139.08°E
- System: Former Australian National regional rail
- Operator: South Australian Railways 1914–1975; Australian National 1975–1990
- Line: Robertstown railway line
- Distance: 134 kilometres from Adelaide
- Platforms: 1

Construction
- Structure type: Ground

Other information
- Status: Closed and demolished

History
- Opened: 9 December 1914; 111 years ago
- Closed: 25 September 1990; 35 years ago

Services
Preceding station	Australian National Railways Commission	Following station
Point Pass towards Adelaide	Robertstown railway line	Terminus
Location

Robertstown was the terminus of the Robertstown railway line serving the South Australian Mid North town of Robertstown.

== History ==
Robertstown railway station opened on 9 December 1914 after a railway line was built from Eudunda on the Morgan railway line. The goods crane at Robertstown is unique in the fact that it is the only railway crane in South Australia that was of a Scotch Derrick design. Robertstown served passengers and freight, with grain being the primary form of traffic in its later years as regular passenger services had ceased on 23 September 1962. With traffic on the line dwindling, the last passenger train to Robertstown was run by Train Tour Promotions using locomotive 804 to farewell the line on 20 May 1989. Less than a year later, the final train on the line, a grain train departed Robertstown on 21 February 1990. AN formally closed the line on 25 February 1990. Robertstown station was demolished, and the line was removed not long after.

== Present Day ==
Today, the collapsed goods crane and the former station sign are all that remain of Robertstown station. The Goyder Interpretive Garden was built on a small portion of the former yard adjacent to Commercial Street, with a small piece of track preserved. The community plans to restore the goods crane eventually.
