= Morgan railway station =

Station in South Australia, 1878 to 1968

Morgan
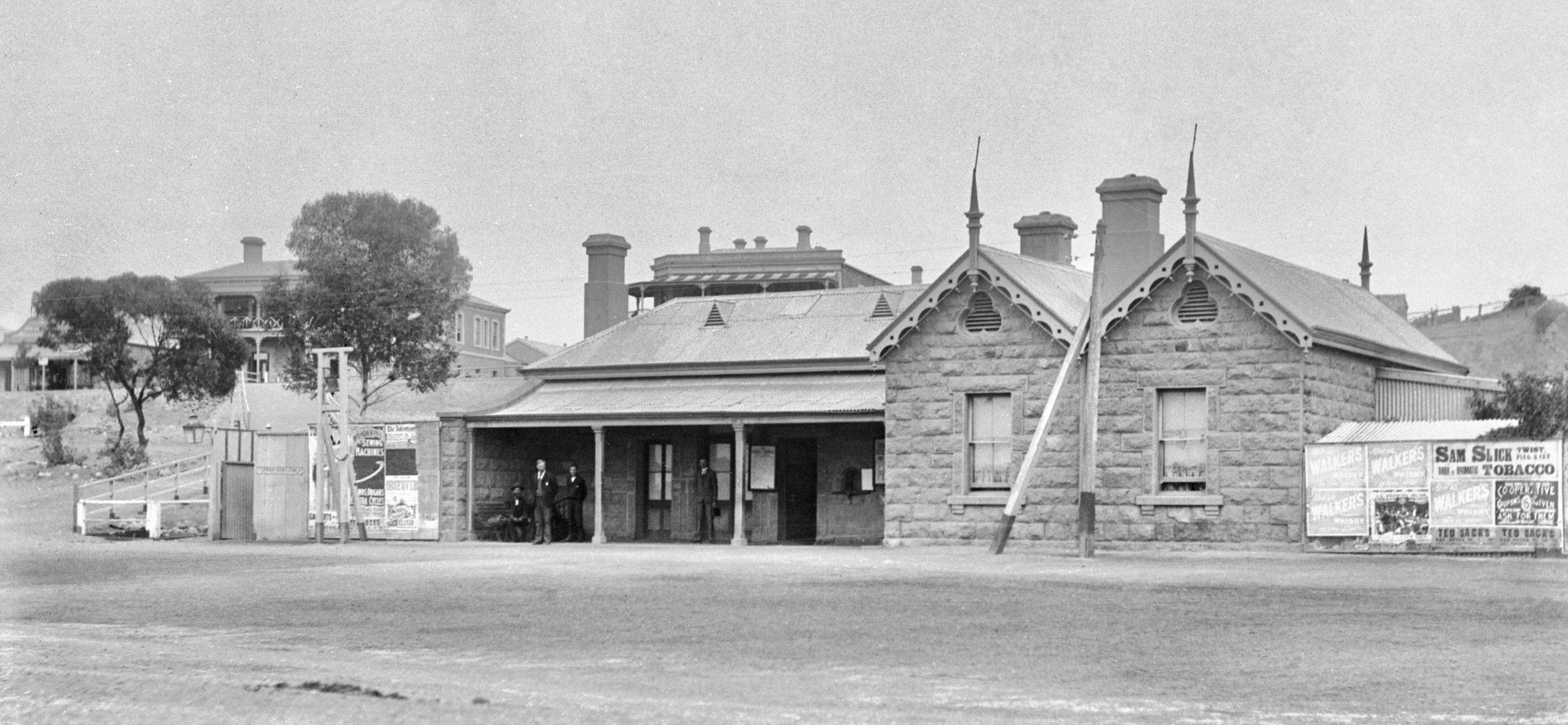
- Morgan Railway Station (1910)

General information
- Location: Railway Terrace, Morgan, South Australia
- Coordinates: 34°02′10″S 139°40′23″E
- Owner: South Australian Railways 1878 - 1969
- Operator: South Australian Railways 1878 - 1968
- Line: Morgan line
- Distance: 169 kilometres from Adelaide
- Platforms: 2
- Tracks: 2

Construction
- Structure type: Ground

Other information
- Status: Closed

History
- Opened: 23 September 1878
- Closed: November 1969

Services
Preceding station	South Australian Railways	Following station
Eba towards Adelaide	Morgan railway line	Terminus
Location

Morgan railway station was the terminus of the Morgan railway line. It served the town of Morgan, South Australia.

== History ==
Morgan railway station opened when the North-West Bend railway reached it on 23 September 1878. It was built to provide a more efficient freight and passenger connection between the Murray paddle steamers and both the city of Adelaide and Port Adelaide for ocean transport. The station was named after Sir William Morgan, who was the Chief Secretary of the state at that time. The station building consisted of a ticket office, refreshment rooms, railway platform and goods cranes. Locomotive 'Pioneer' had made the first trial run to Morgan as early as 17 April 1878. Morgan eventually became one of the busiest shipping ports on the Murray and the second biggest in South Australia. About six trains a day carried freight from the Murray to the sea at Port Adelaide.

== Decline and closure ==
Rail transport at the port declined during the early 20th century as road transport approved. Regular passenger services ceased in December 1968. The last train Duchess of Gloucester pulled out of Morgan in November 1969. The railway line was eventually dismantled with the station being officially closed.

== Present day ==
The station building was registered as a South Australian Heritage on 4 March 1993. The station was converted into a historic railway museum.

There were proposals to extend the line beyond Morgan to Wentworth, and even as far as Hay to provide a more direct railway route to Sydney.
