= Morgan, South Australia =

Morgan
- Town
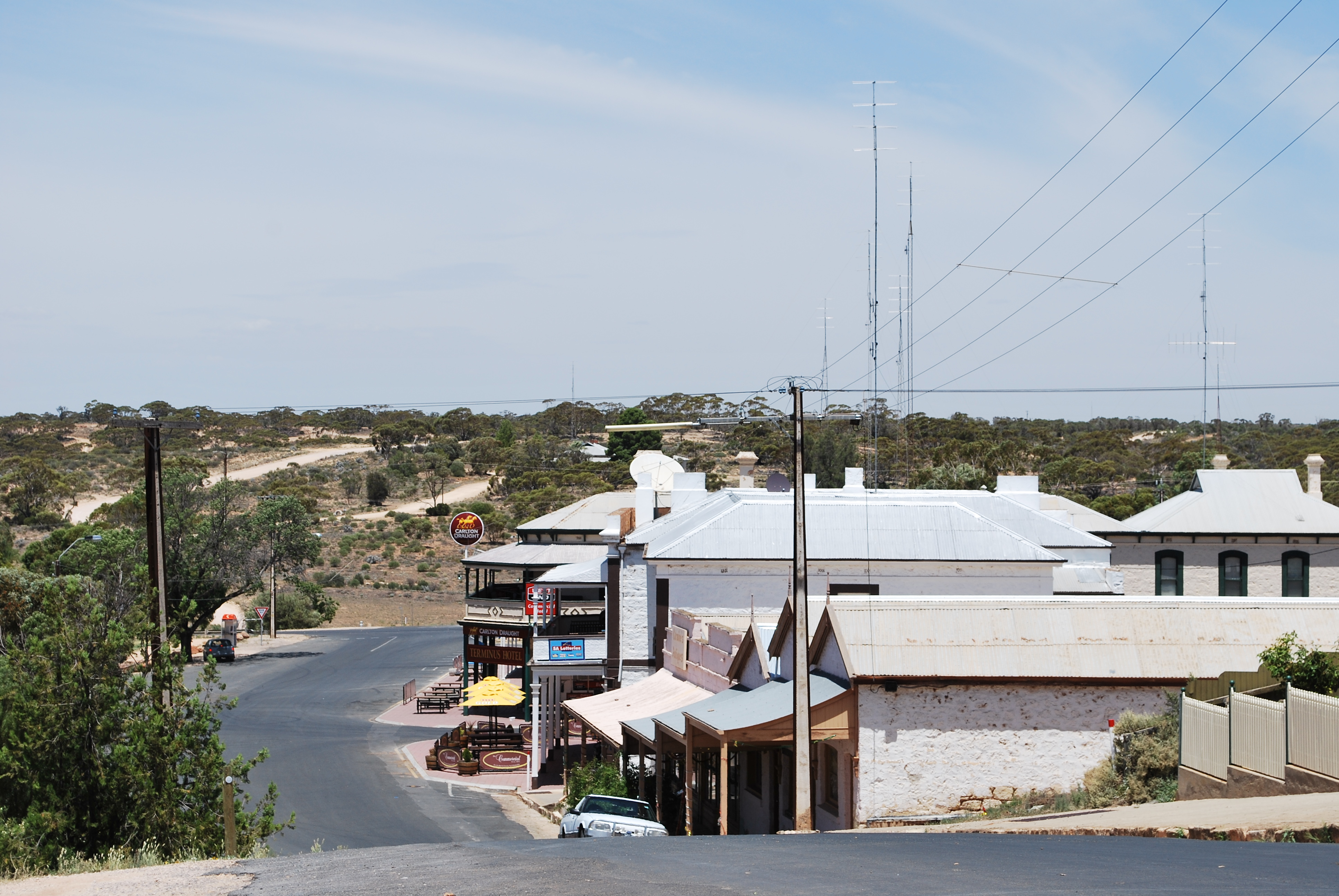

- Coordinates: 34°02′0″S 139°40′0″E
- Country: Australia
- State: South Australia
- LGA: Mid Murray Council
- Location: 161 km (100 mi) NE of Adelaide; 43 km (27 mi) NW of Waikerie
- Established: 25 April 1878 (town); 27 March 2003 (locality)

Government
  - State electorate: Chaffey
  - Federal division: Barker

Population
  - Total: 326 (UCL 2021)
- Postcode: 5320
Localities around Morgan
| Lindley | Lindley | Stuart |
| Eba | Morgan | Stuart; Cadell; North West Bend; Beaumonts; Morphetts Flat; Brenda Park; Cadell; Murbko; Wombats Rest; Murbko |
| Blanchetown | Blanchetown | Murbko |

Morgan is a town in South Australia on the right bank of the Murray River, (Note: Officially the River Murray in South Australia, as per Government of South Australia stipulation of nomenclature when referring to the two major rivers of the state, the River Murray and River Torrens.) just downstream of where it turns from flowing roughly westwards to roughly southwards. It is about 161 kilometres (100 mi) north east of Adelaide, and about 315 kilometres (196 mi) upstream of the Murray Mouth.

== History ==
Several Aboriginal names are recorded: Korkoranna for Morgan itself, Koolpoola for the opposite flats, and Coerabko ('Katarapko'), meaning meeting place, for the bend locality. Morgan is in the traditional lands of the Ngaiawang people. Nganguruku people moved to the Morgan area when they lost access to their traditional lands further south.

The first Europeans to visit were the expedition of Charles Sturt, who passed by in a rowboat in 1830. The first Europeans to visit overland, by horseback, in March 1838, was the expedition of Hill, Oakden, Willis, and Wood. They noted a large Indigenous population. The locality was originally known to Europeans as the North West Bend, or Nor'west Bend, or Great South Bend, due to an acute change in the trend and direction of the Murray. The westward flowing stream of the river turns here to flow southward. The nearby pioneering pastoral station, Northwest Bend Station, established in the 1840s, still bears that name.

The town was proclaimed in 1878, the year the railway line from Adelaide via Kapunda was opened, and was named at that time after Sir William Morgan, then Chief Secretary, later Premier of South Australia. A large wharf was built, and Morgan, being the railway terminus (hence the name of a local hotel), became one of the busiest ports on the Murray. It handled nearly all the goods that were being imported and exported (particularly wool) to and from a vast region upstream from Morgan along the Murray and Darling rivers. At its peak, Morgan was the second busiest port in South Australia (behind only Port Adelaide), with six trains a day carrying freight from the Murray to the sea at Port Adelaide.

As road transport improved through the early part of the 20th century, river transport declined. The railway to Morgan finally closed in 1969.

== Heritage listings ==
Morgan has a number of heritage-listed buildings, including:

- Railway Terrace: Morgan railway station and Station Master's House
- 11 Railway Terrace: Post Office Row
- 25 Railway Terrace: Landseer's Store
- Morgan Wharf

== Modern Morgan ==
Morgan today is well known for its number of houseboat moorings and services, and a houseboat marina is currently under construction. A free road transport ferry service operates 24 hours for river crossings. Just southward (downstream) from Morgan is a riverfront development named Brenda Park, which has flourished since WWII, originally as rustic shacks, but now as prestige waterfront holiday homes.

Despite these new developments, many historic buildings remain in the town. A number of these buildings have signs showing their former use and appearance. The two hotels, both historic, sit opposite each other, facing the riverfront. A caravan park is sited near the riverfront. Morgan is in the Mid Murray Council local government area, the state electoral district of Stuart, and the federal Division of Barker.

During World War II, the Morgan-Whyalla pipeline was built from the Murray River at Morgan to supply fresh water to the city of Whyalla.

The wasp Pseudofoenus morganensis Jennings & Austin 2002 (Hymenoptera: Gasteruptiidae) is named after the town of Morgan.

== Gallery ==
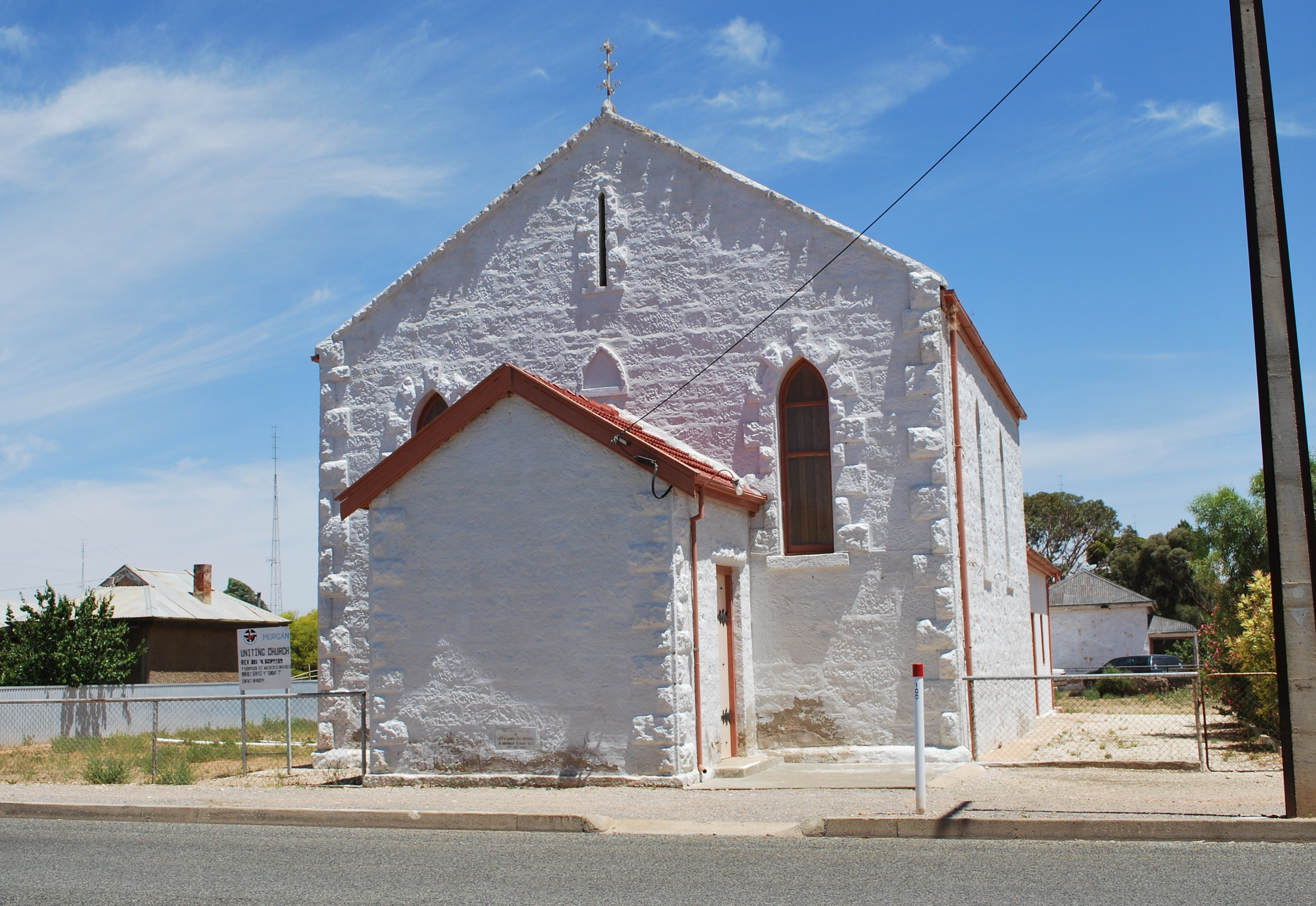
Uniting Church

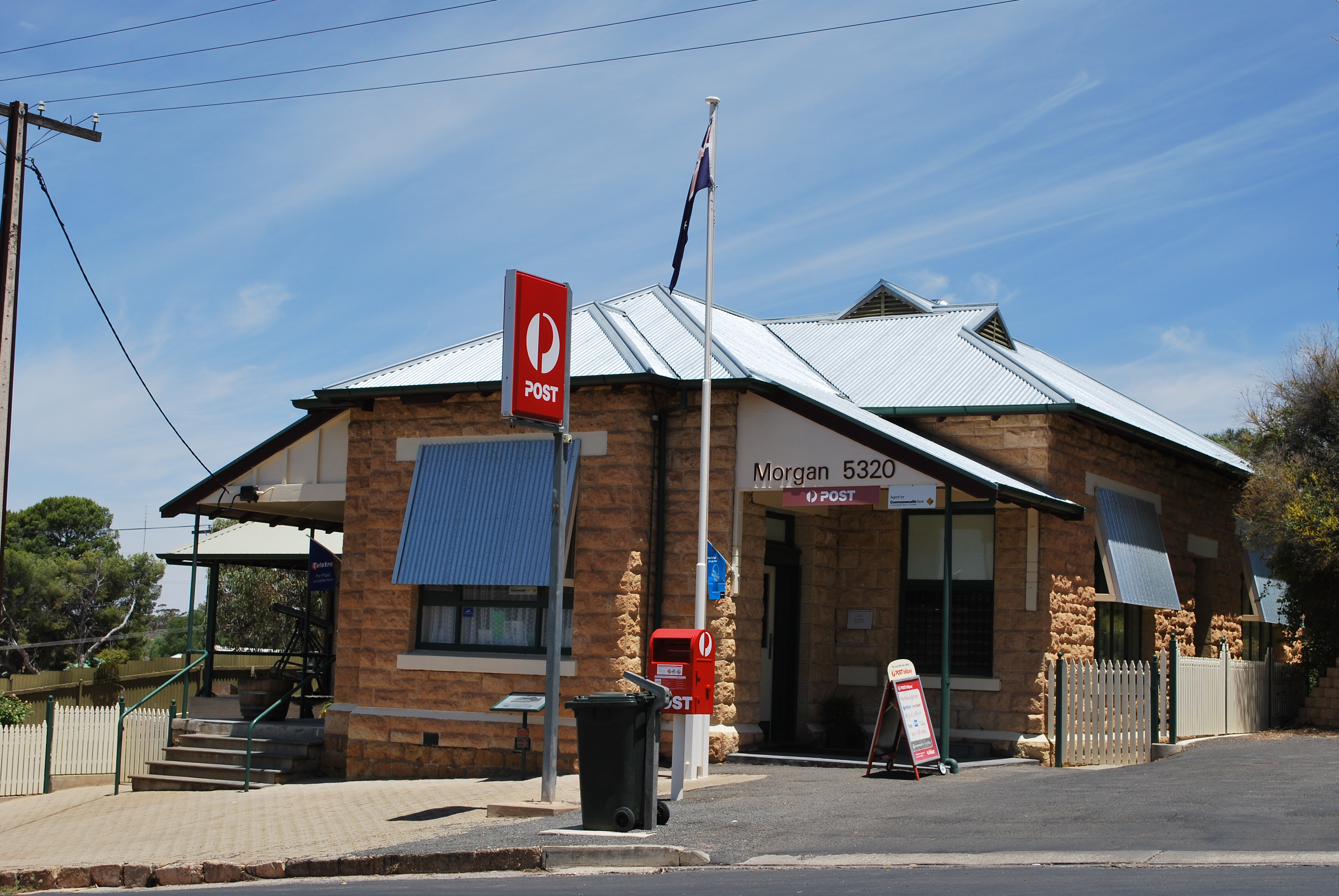
Post Office

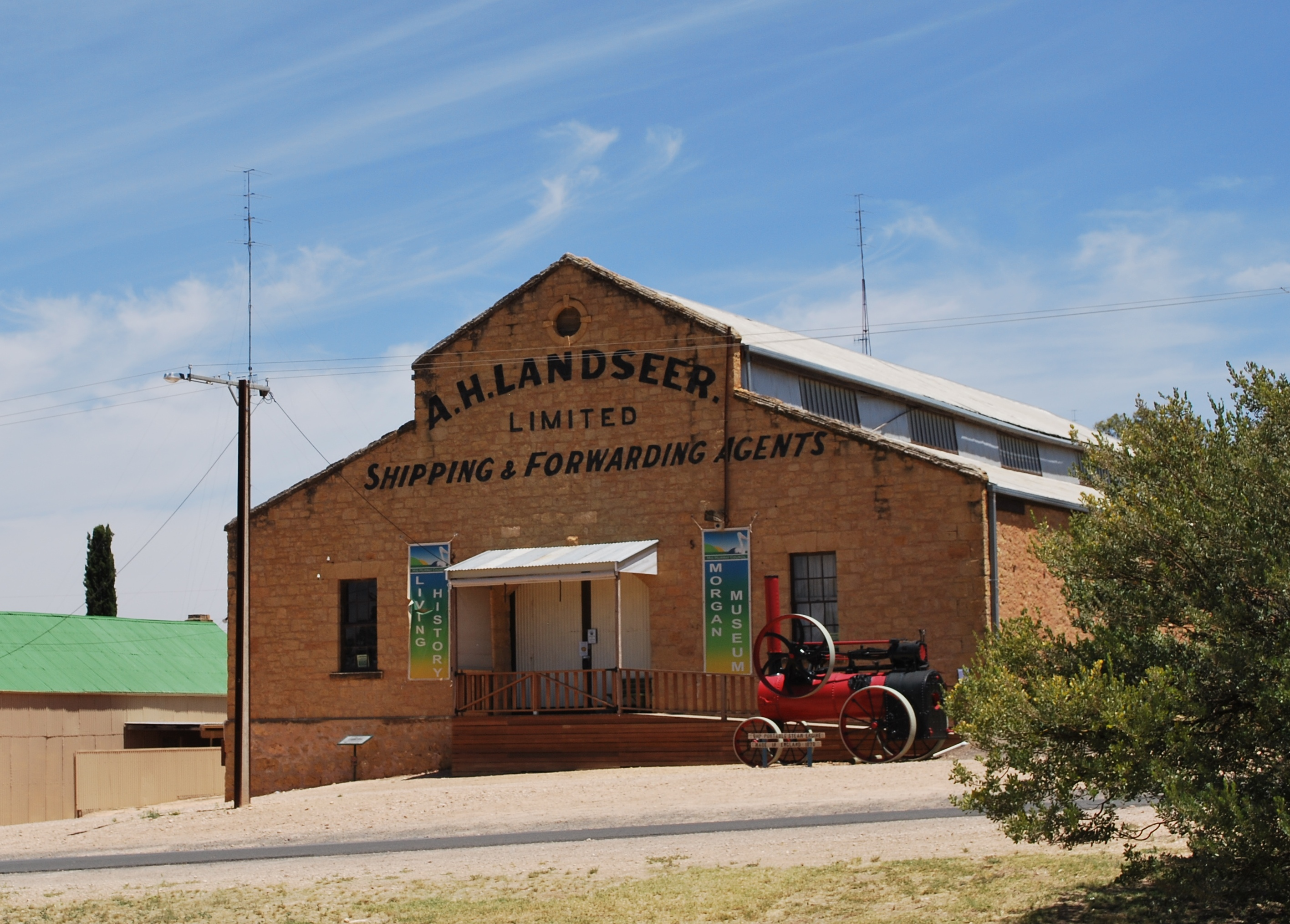
Museum

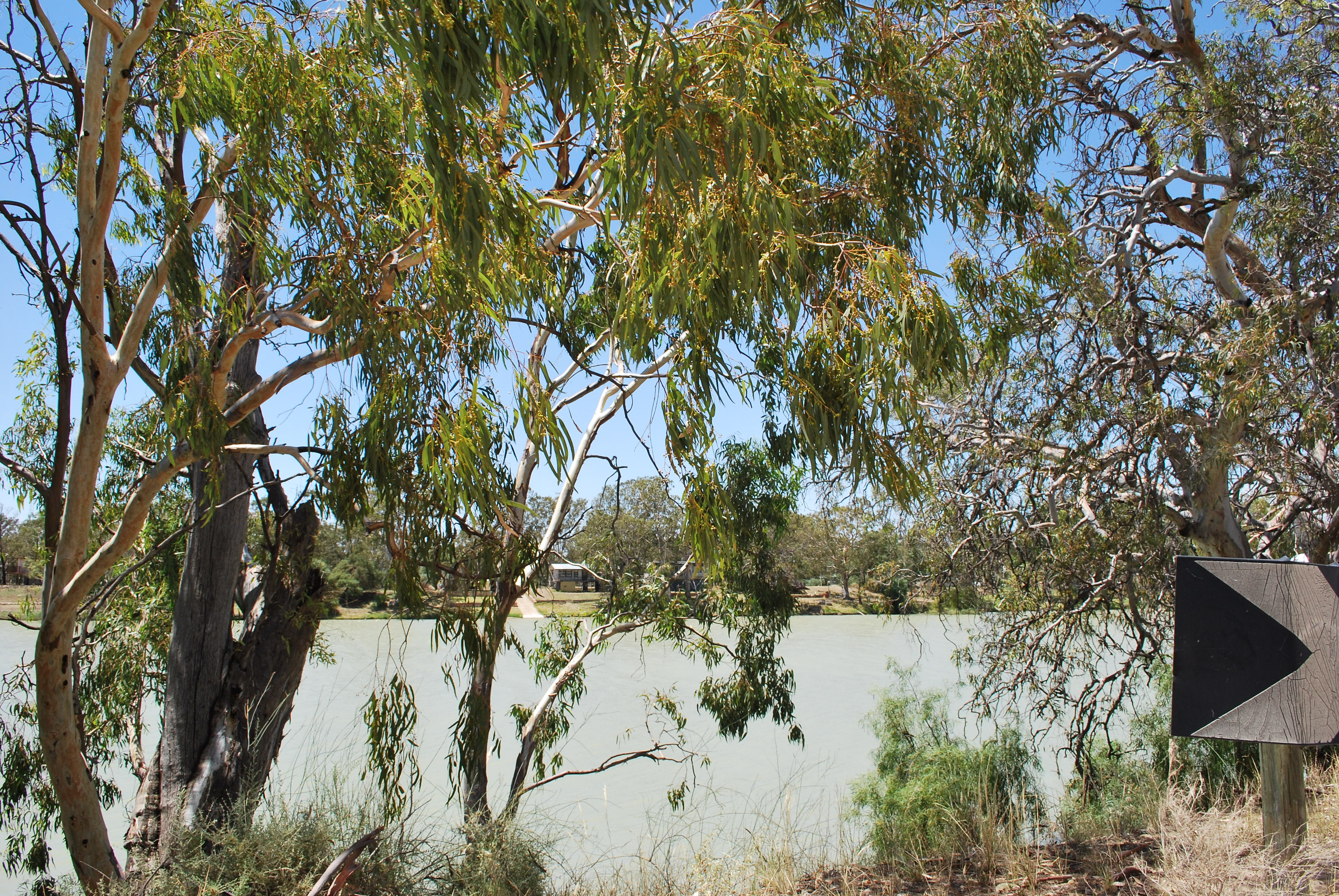
Murray River

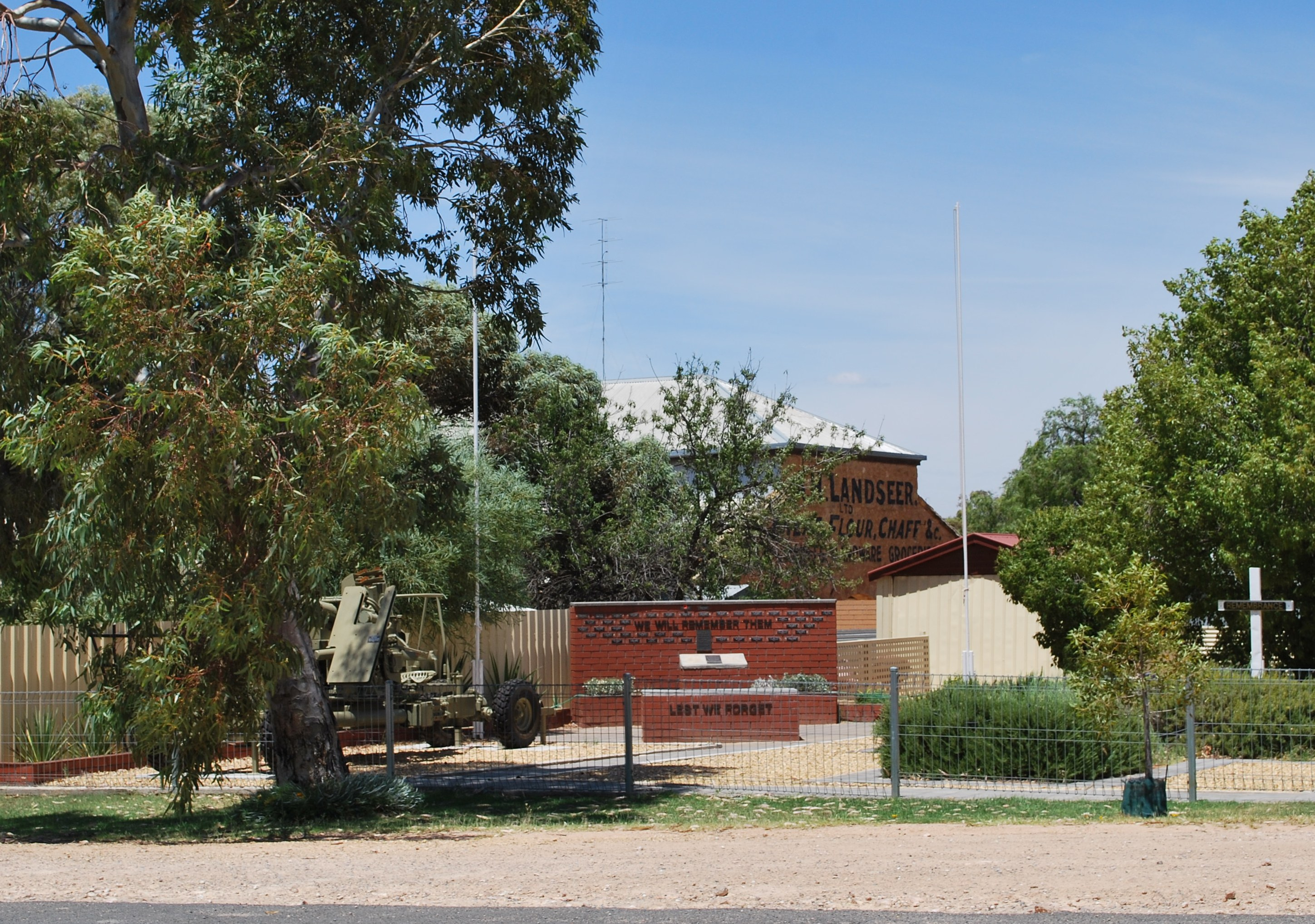
War Memorial

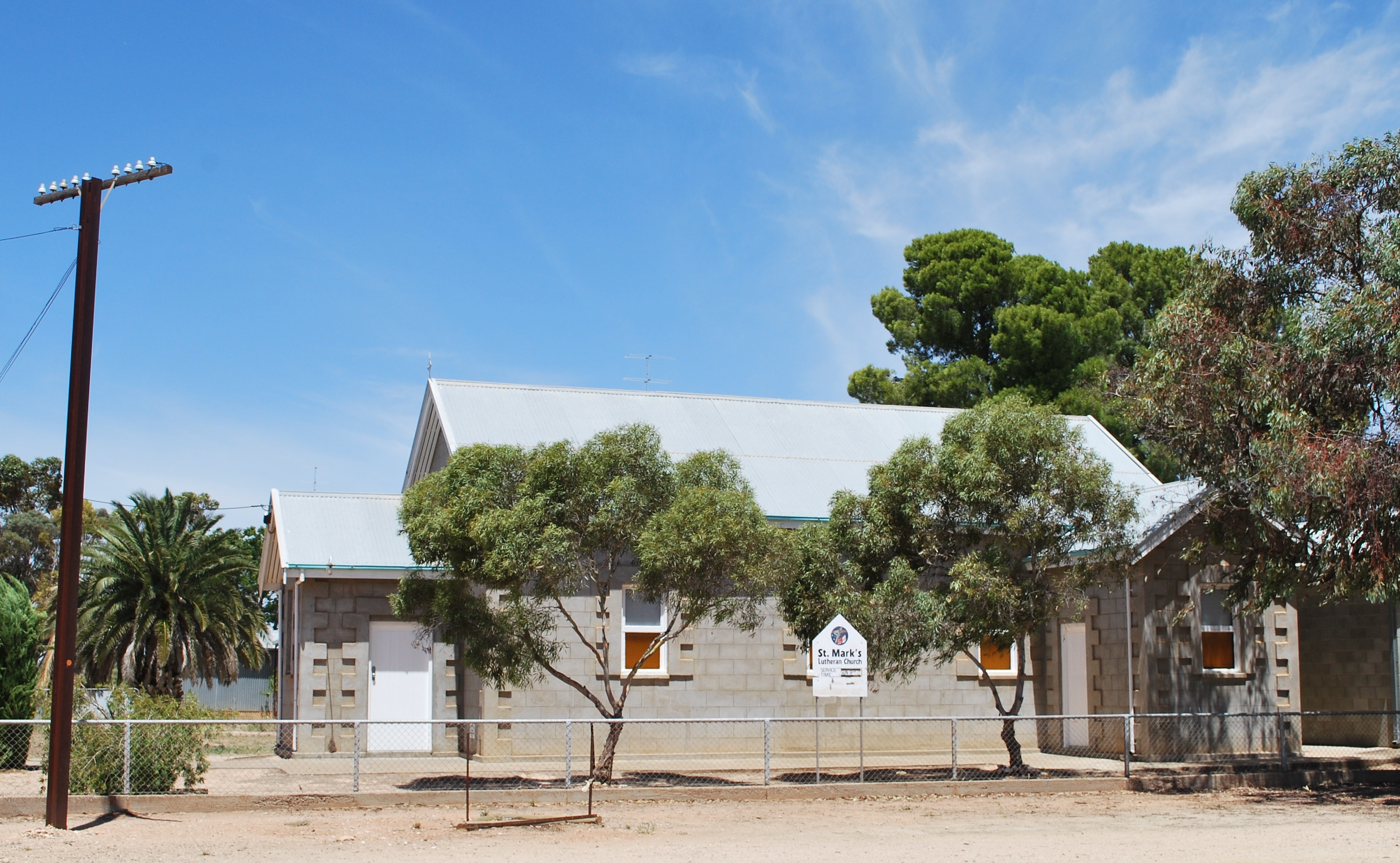
Lutheran Church

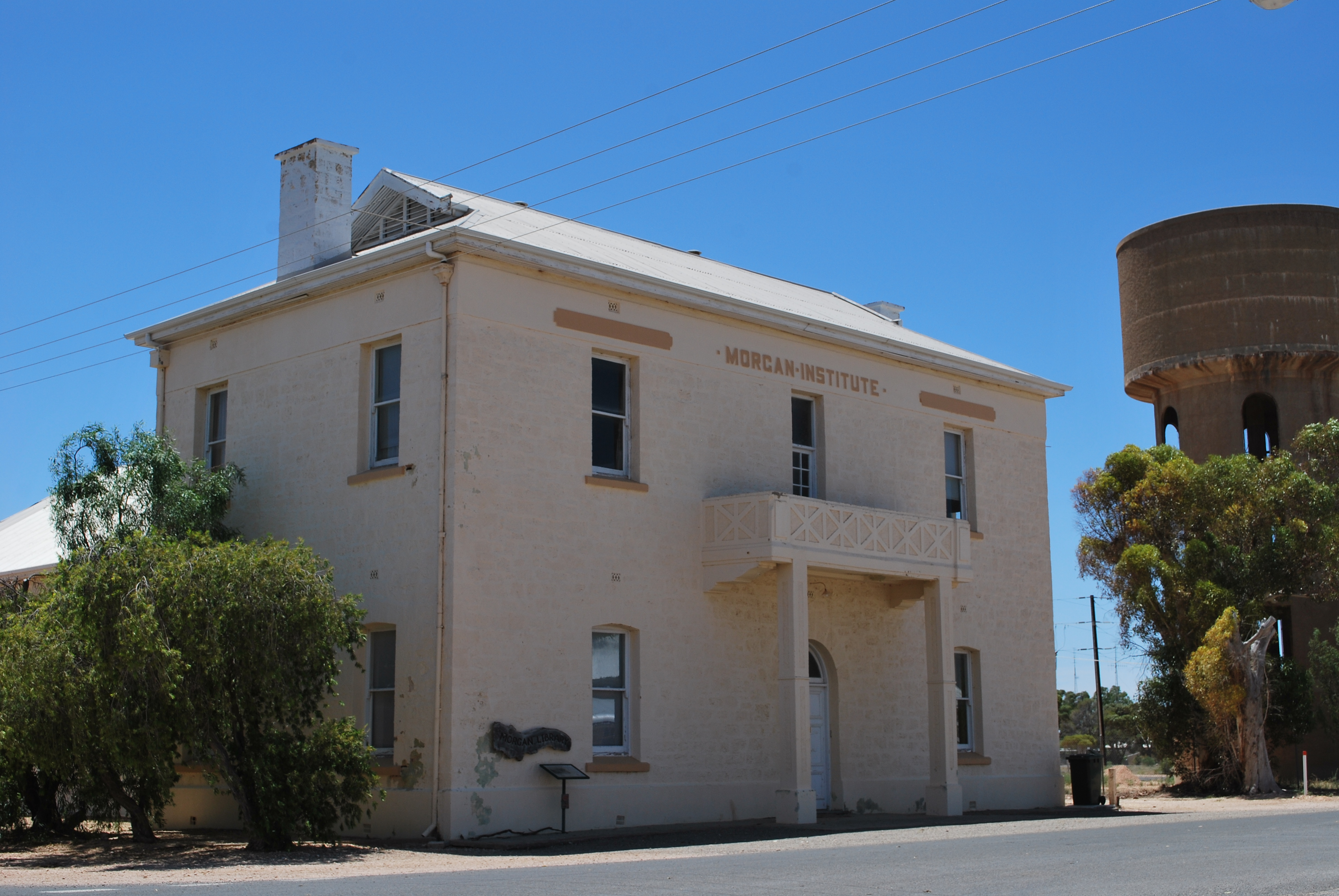
Morgan Institute

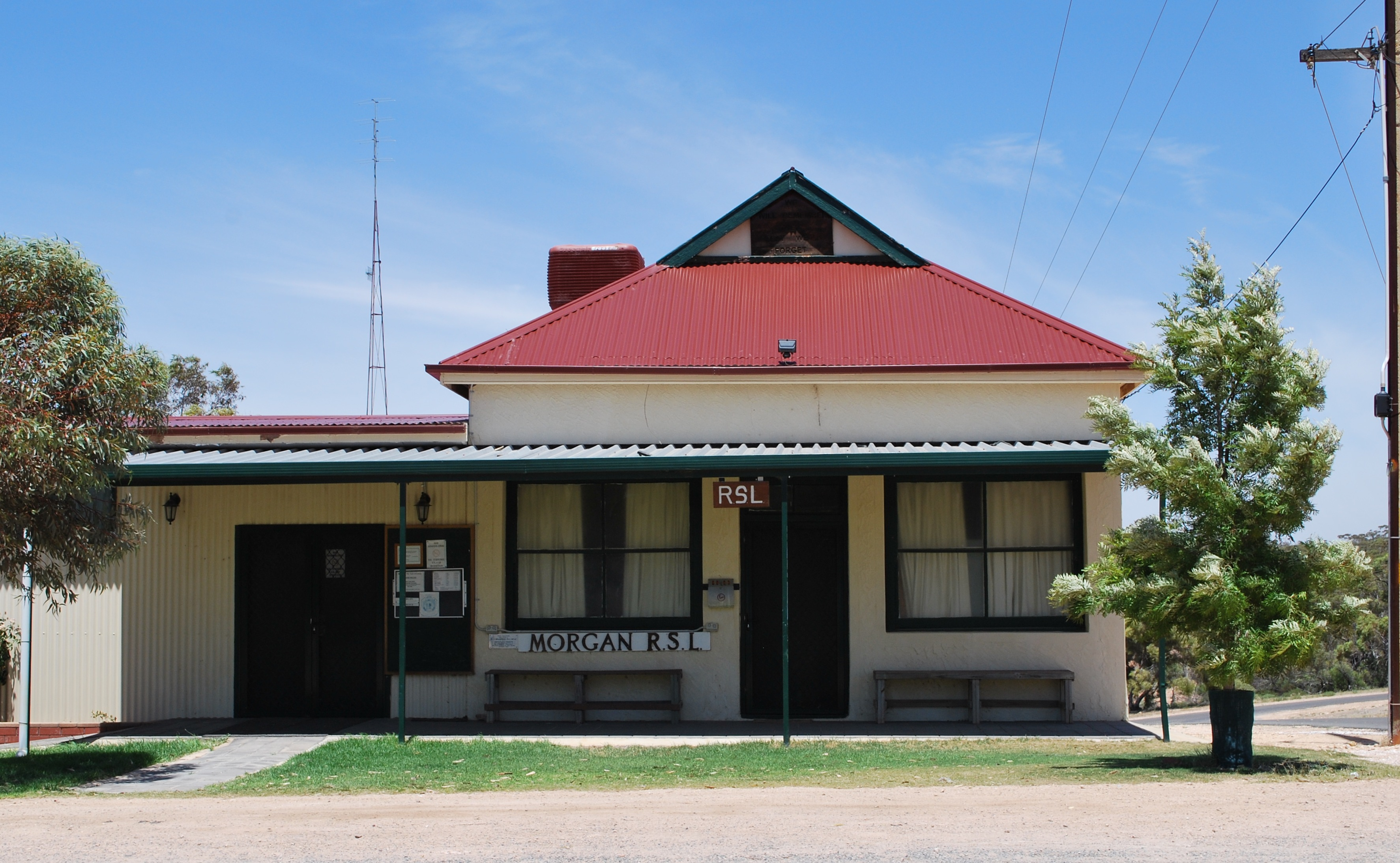
RSL

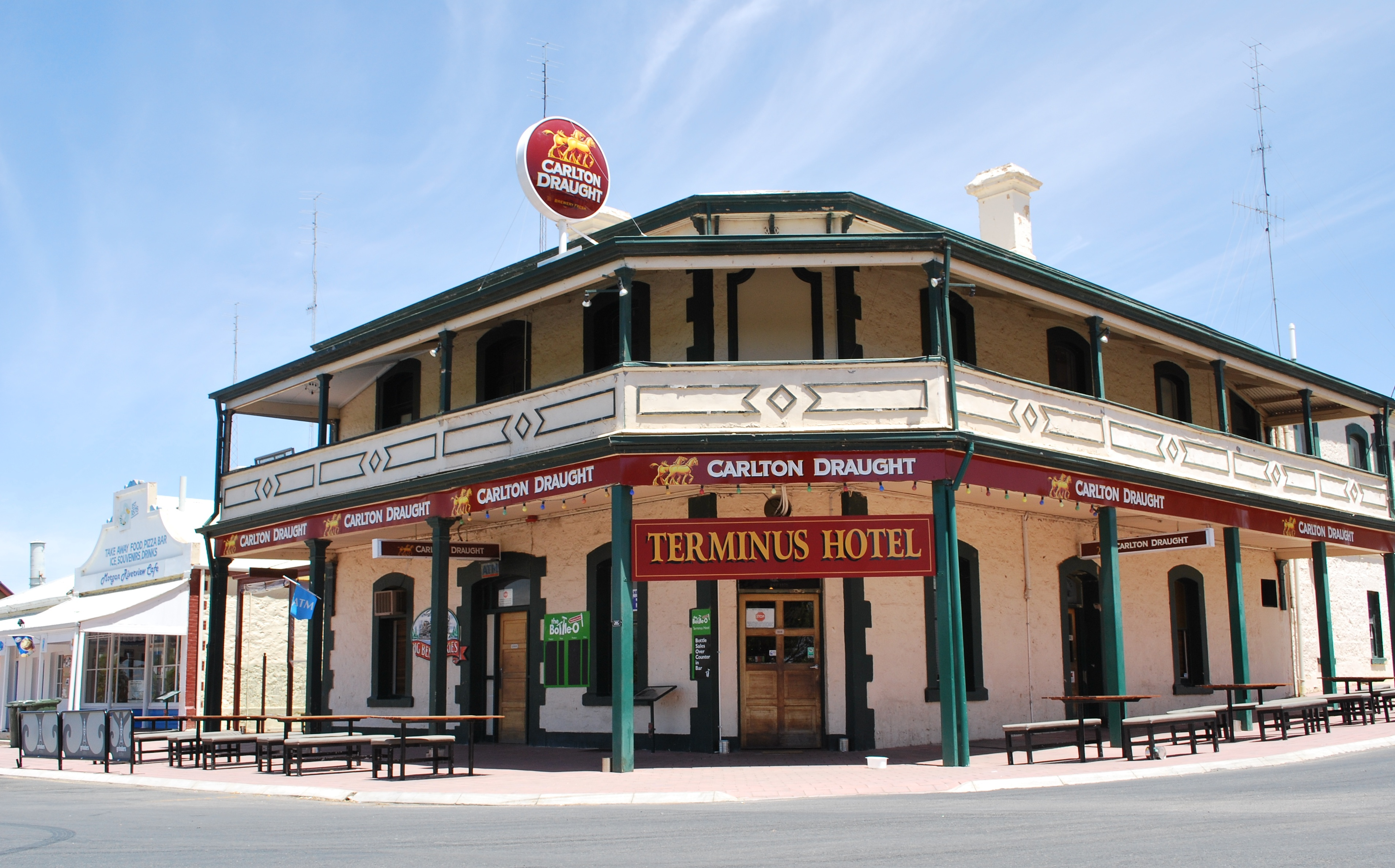
Terminus Hotel

== See also ==
- Cadell Training Centre
- Murray River crossings
