= Morgan railway line =

Former railway line in South Australia

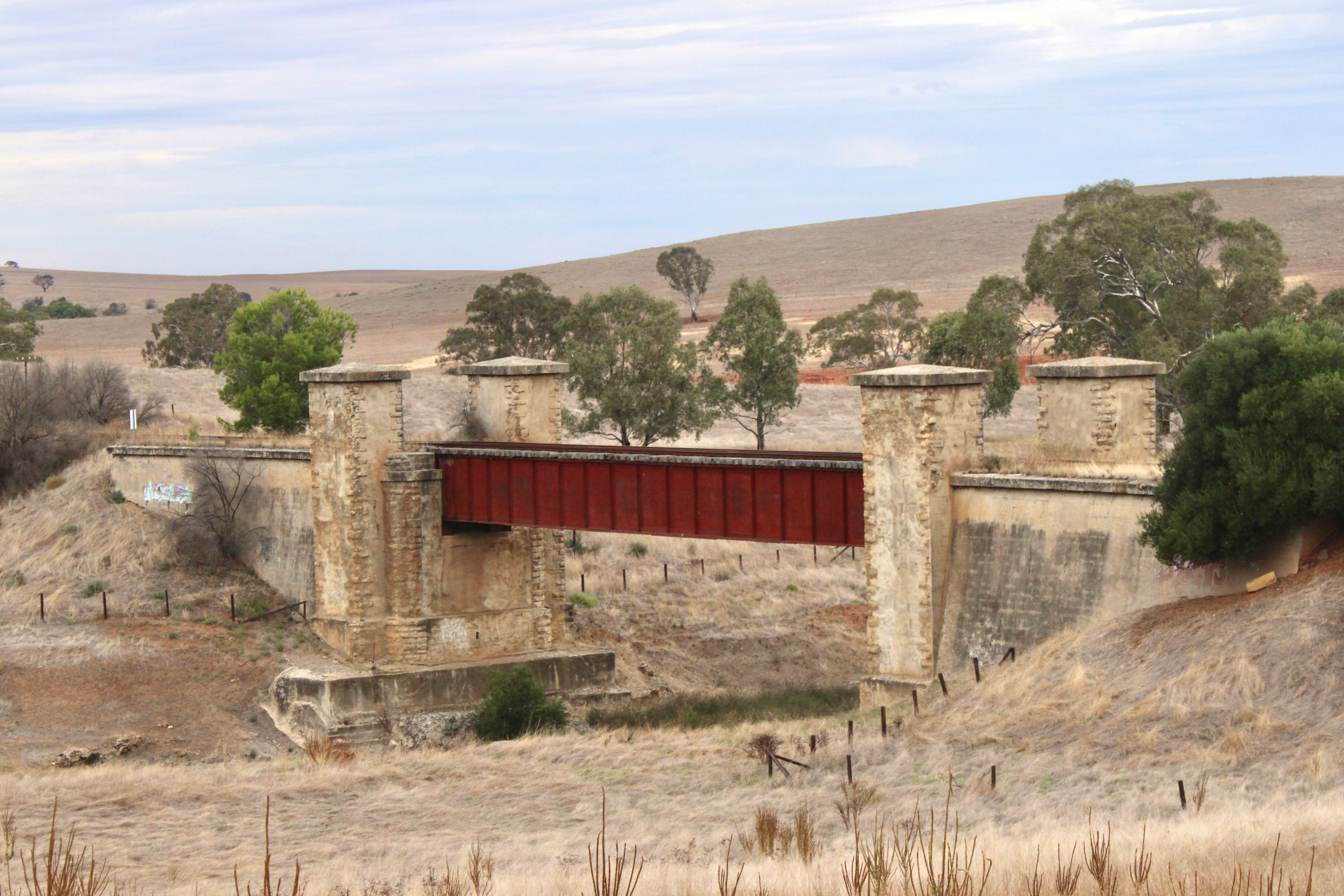
- The former Light River railway bridge near Kapunda in April 2022.

Overview
- Status: Closed and dismantled beyond Kapunda, remaining section dormant
- Termini: Gawler; Morgan
- Continues from: Gawler line

Service
- System: South Australian Railways
- Operator(s): South Australian Railways; Australian National; Australian Southern Railroad

History
- Opened: Gawler–Kapunda: 13 August 1860; Kapunda-Morgan: 23 September 1878
- Closed: Eudunda-Morgan: 2 November 1969; Kapunda-Eudunda: 11 March 1994

Technical
- Line length: 129.0 km (80.2 mi)
- Track gauge: 1,600 mm (5 ft 3 in)

The Morgan railway line or North-West Bend railway was a railway line on the South Australian Railways network.

== History ==
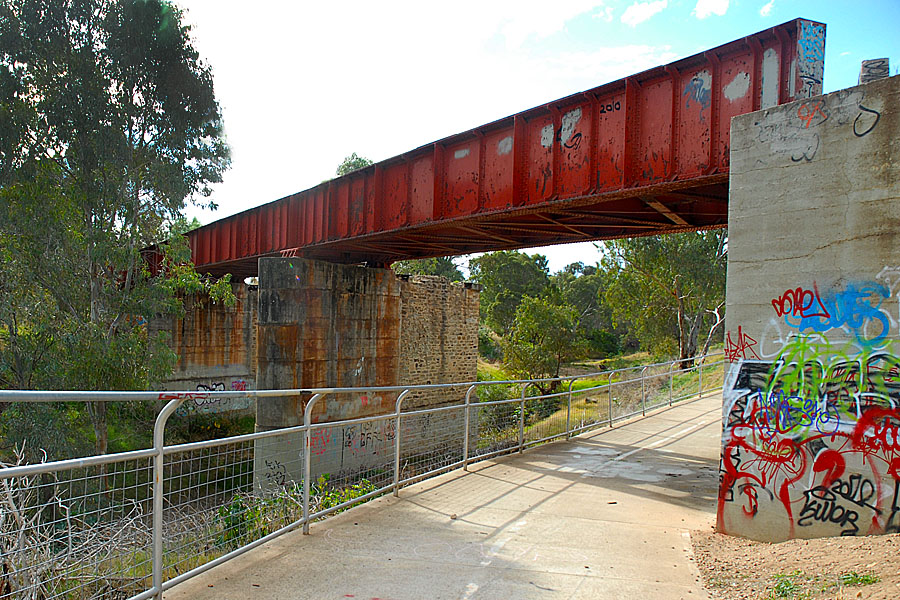
Bridge over the Gawler River (2012)

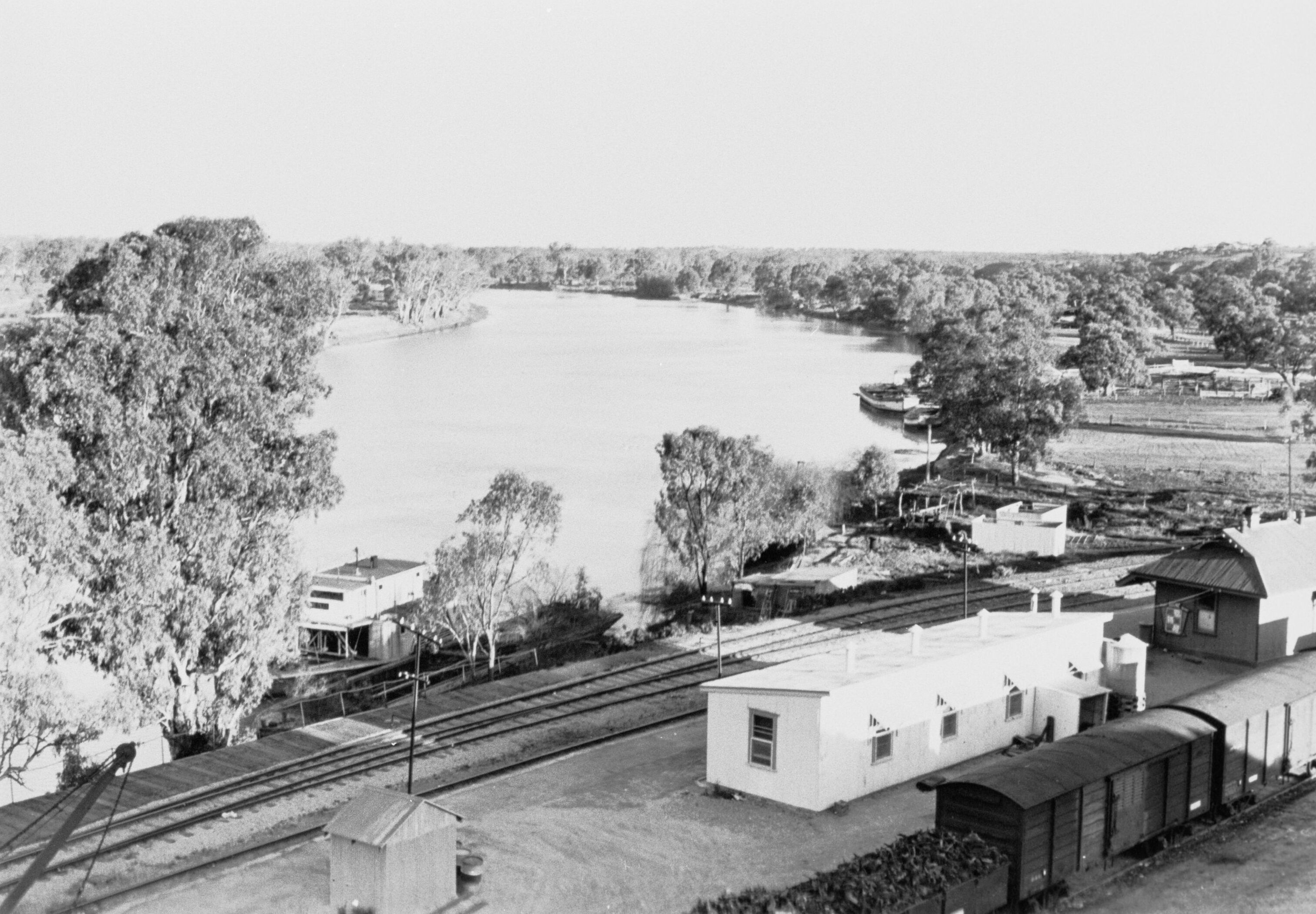
Morgan railway station during operation

The first section of the line opened from Gawler. It was built to service the copper mining at Kapunda, opened on 13 August 1860. It was extended to Morgan on 23 September 1878 to provide a more efficient freight and passenger connection between the Murray paddle steamers and both the city of Adelaide and Port Adelaide for ocean transport.

The Eudunda to Morgan section closed on 2 November 1969, and Morgan residents requested that the line was preserved to Mount Mary. This was rejected, and the line being removed not long after. In 1978, the remaining line to Eudunda and the Robertstown branch came under the ownership of Australian National as part of the SAR's sale to the Federal Government. The Kapunda to Eudunda section was closed on 11 March 1994 by AN, with the deterioration of the River Light bridge at Hansborough being cited as a reason for closure. This section was pulled up the following year. The remaining Gawler to Kapunda section was leased by the South Australian Government to Australian Southern Railroad (later known as ORA) in 1997 as part of AN's SA freight asset sale to Genesee and Wyoming. The line's last documented use was on 21 May 2003 by Australian Railroad Group locomotive CK4, though grain services had ceased years before. In 2015, a short section of the line within Kapunda was repurposed as the Swann Path (also known as the Kapunda Rail Trail,) and it is planned to be extended to the southern end of the town in the future. The lease of the land and ownership of the rail infrastructure passed to Aurizon in 2022, following their purchase of One Rail Australia (the final successor of Australian Southern Railroad).

== Present day ==
The line's present owner, Aurizon does not list the line as being open or in use, but it is available for access. The line has fallen into disrepair, being damaged by floods and bushfires. The line has been severed at several points for drainage and road surface improvements. In 2022, the line was blocked off from the Gawler line, and the wider Adelaide metropolitan network after a fence was installed at the Gawler River bridge.

== Route ==
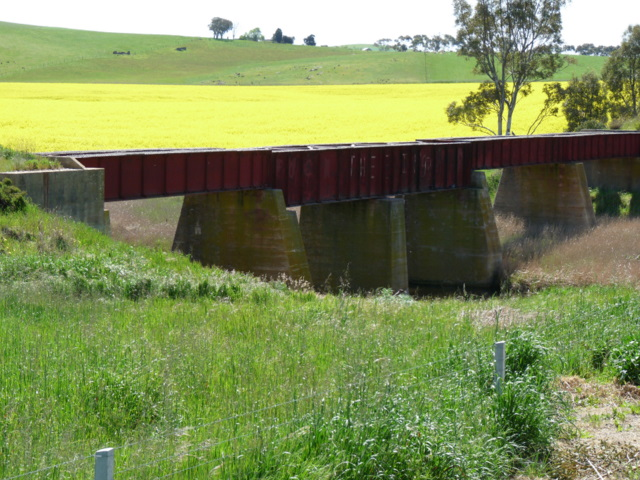
Railway bridge over Light River at Hansborough (2010)

The Kapunda railway was the first extension of the line from Adelaide to Gawler. It passed through Roseworthy from where the Peterborough line later branched. The line headed northeast from Roseworthy to reach Freeling, then the line crossed the River Light just south of Kapunda. The extension continued through Hansborough, running across the River Light once again and Pine Creek before reaching Hampden, then turning south and going through a steep descent into Eudunda. From there, the line curved northwards towards the junction for the Robertstown line, then heading west across the plains adjacent to what is now the Thiele Highway to Morgan. The Robertstown line branch opened in 1914 from Eudunda to Robertstown, passing through Point Pass along the way.

== Possible extension ==
There were proposals to extend the line to connect to Wentworth, New South Wales, and even to Hay to provide a more direct rail route to Sydney.
