= Silverton Tramway =

Former railway in outback New South Wales

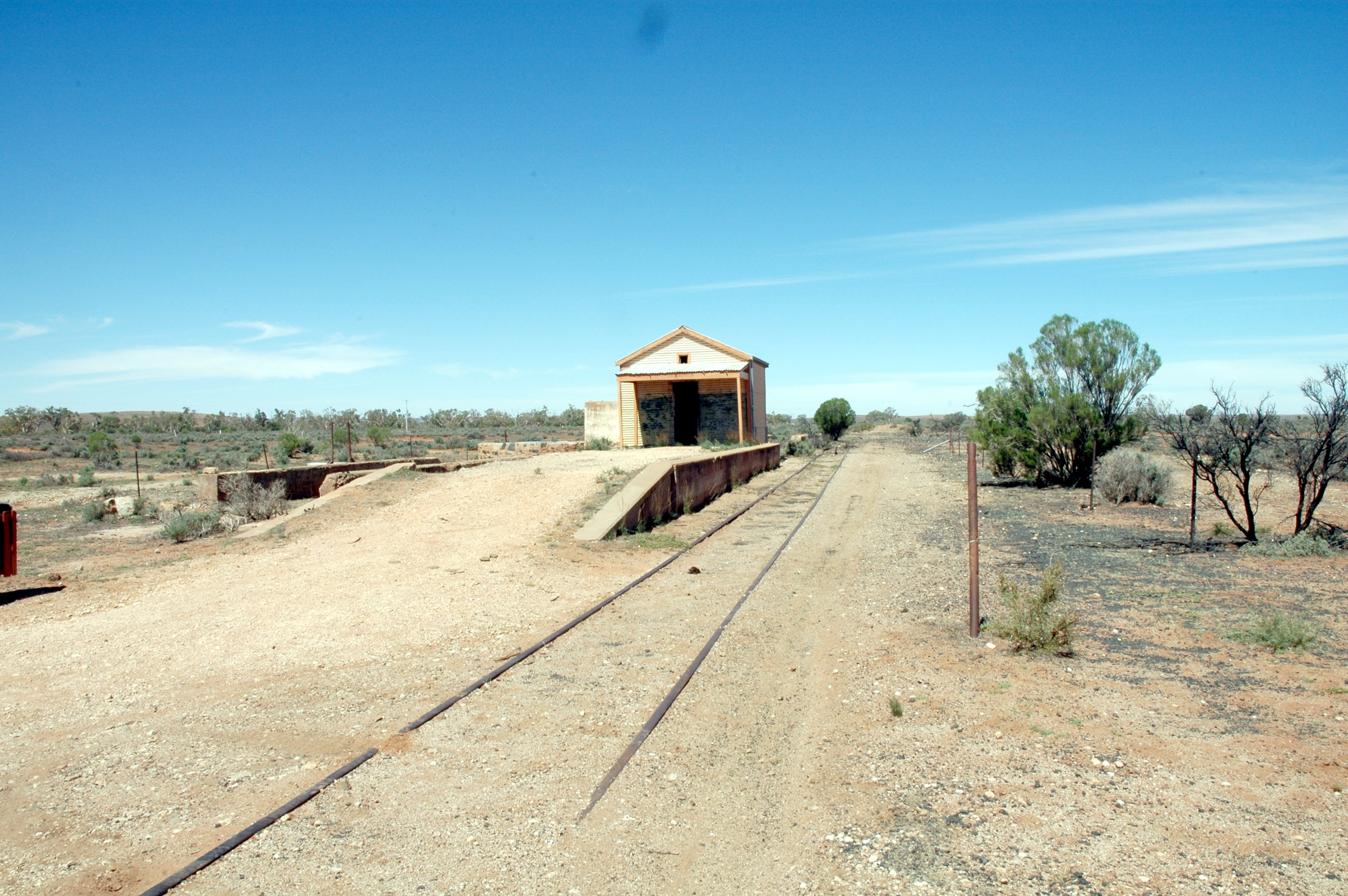
- A defunct goods platform and shed in 2008 – once part of the busy station at the town of Silverton

Overview
- Termini: Cockburn; Broken Hill
- Continues from: Crystal Brook-Cockburn line
- Stations: 6

Service
- Operator(s): Silverton Tramway Company

History
- Opened: 12 January 1888
- Closed: 9 January 1970

Technical
- Line length: 58 km (36 mi)
- Track gauge: 1,067 mm (3 ft 6 in)

The Silverton Tramway was a 58-kilometre-long 1,067 mm (3 ft 6 in) railway line running from Cockburn on the South Australian state border to Broken Hill in New South Wales. Operating between 1888 and 1970, it served the mines in Broken Hill, and formed the link between the 1,435 mm (4 ft 8 1/2 in) standard gauge New South Wales Government Railways and the narrow gauge South Australian Railways lines. It was owned and operated by the Silverton Tramway Company (STC).

The Silverton Tramway was one of only two privately owned railways in New South Wales, originally founded to transport ore from local mines in the Broken Hill and Silverton region into South Australia. The company soon branched out, not only carrying ore from the mines but freighted other goods and offered a passenger service which eventually accounted for a third of their business. From 1888 to 1970 it was critical to the economic functioning of Broken Hill, by providing the key transport of ore to the Port Pirie smelters. It played a significant role in the politics and recreation of Broken Hill, and a crucial role at times of water shortage in Broken Hill.

== History ==
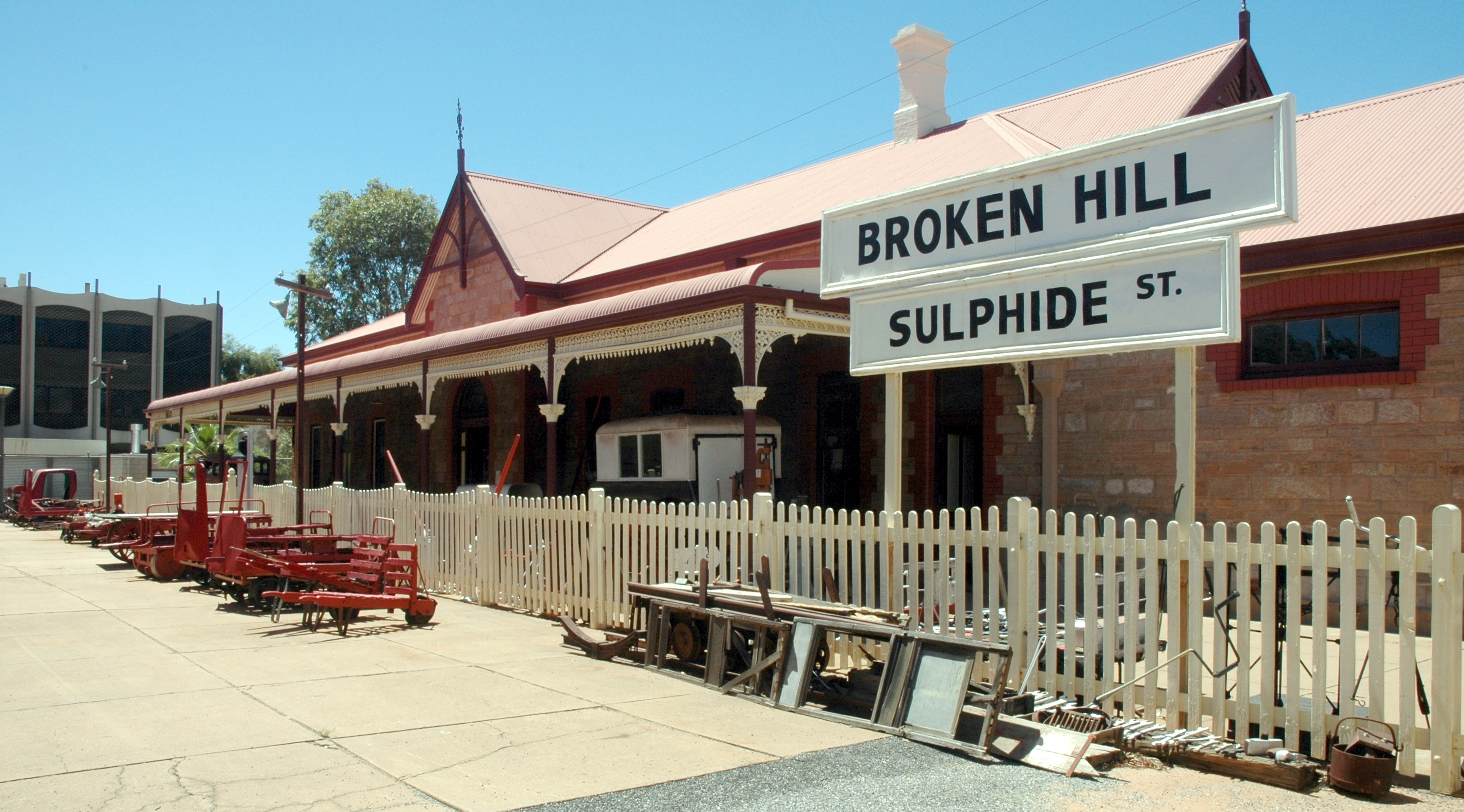
The former Sulphide Street railway station in Broken Hill, now a museum

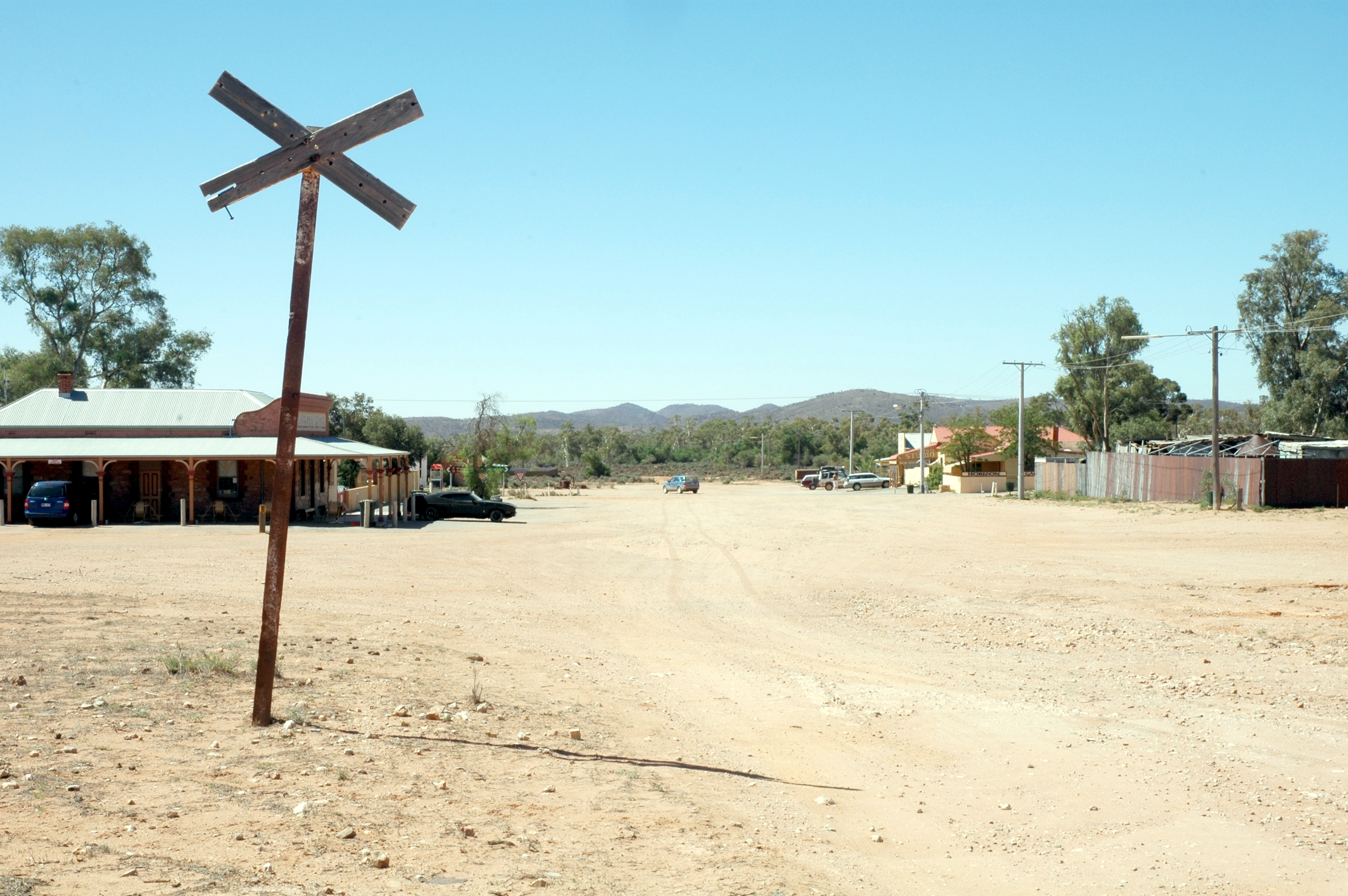
Abandoned level crossing in Silverton

=== Inception ===
The Silverton Tramway was conceived as a way to transport silver-lead-zinc ore from the newly discovered ore deposits at Silverton, to the smelters at Port Pirie, with the line later extended to Broken Hill with the discovery of that field. The need for a private line was in part due to the New South Wales Government refusing to allow the South Australian Railways to extend its line from Port Pirie across the border. The Silverton Tramway Act 1886 was passed by the New South Wales parliament, permitting the narrow gauge line to be built by the STC. The Act also permitted the New South Wales Government to buy out the company and assets after 21 years, upon payment of an amount equal to 21 times the average divisible profits over the preceding seven years, and that the company could be obliged to alter the track gauge at any time at its expense. The line was built in twelve months at a cost of £125,000. The contract to build the line was awarded to C&E Millar, who were building the Peterborough to Cockburn line at the same time. The first train reached Broken Hill on 6 September 1887, with the line officially opened on 12 January 1888 by the Duke of Manchester.

Services were initially operated by South Australian Railways Y class locomotives until the STC acquired its own locomotives. In late 1888, a deal was reached for the South Australian Railways to assume responsibility for the main line workings with the STC operating services to the various mines and sidings in Broken Hill. This ceased on 30 June 1893, with the STC once again operating all services.

Major traffic on the line included passengers, livestock, bullion, ore and concentrates. In 1913, 844,477 tons of ore and concentrates were carried on the tramway and another 843,307 tons of other goods including coke, coal, timber, crude oil and livestock, and by 1933 twenty steam locomotives were owned by the company, along with 660 goods wagons.

The company serviced travellers on long trips heading interstate to Semaphore (Adelaide) to the Largs Bay Holiday Camp and excursions for local community groups often conveying passengers to Silverton and McCulloch Park (at Stephens Creek) for the day and returning to Broken Hill in the afternoon. When traveling to South Australia the train would travel from Broken Hill, through Silverton and then to Burns which is on the New South Wales side of the border of Cockburn (a town divided by the NSW/SA border).

A four-road engine shed, 15.24-metre (50.0-foot) turntable and small workshop were built just outside Broken Hill at Railway Town.

The line had six stations: Cockburn, Burns, Thackaringa, Silverton, Railway Town and Sulphide Street. When the New South Wales line opened in 1919, it terminated at a separate station 200 metres to the east.

In 1927 the New South Wales government completed the railway from Sydney to Broken Hill, thus joining the Silverton Tramway and completing the link from Sydney to Adelaide.

=== Gauge conversion ===
After the completion of the Trans-Australian Railway in 1937, the Silverton Tramway and the South Australian line to Port Pirie was a missing link in an unbroken Sydney to Perth rail journey (Perth to Kalgoorlie was the other). Moves towards conversion of the line to standard gauge were made with the passing of the Railway Standardisation Agreement Act of 1944, in which the New South Wales Government would acquire the Silverton Tramway Company, then pass it to the South Australian Railways. This agreement lapsed, with a new one made in 1949, in which the Commonwealth Government would be responsible for the acquisition.

The New South Wales Government did not wish the company to remain as a main line operator, or to purchase it themselves; while South Australian train crews were not happy to work trains across the state border due to a loss of favourable industrial conditions. When the company purchased its diesel locomotives, a number of structures, including bridges, were modified (loading gauge and axle loading) to carry standard gauge, as the company ordered the wider bogies needed to operate on standard gauge. By 1967, the Silverton Tramway Company had offered to build a standard gauge line for a fixed sum, and transfer the line to New South Wales soon after. This line would have run from Cockburn to Broken Hill on an alignment that had some interaction with the existing Crystal Street station, but the Commonwealth Government rejected it as it wished for the line to be built on a new alignment.

=== Demise and preservation ===
The Silverton Tramway played a strategic role in the trans-Australia network until 1970, when it was surpassed by the new standard gauge line. The Silverton Tramway closed on 9 January 1970. The standard gauge line opened on a new alignment which led directly to the New South Wales operated Crystal Street station, taking one year and over $2 million more than if the Silverton proposal was carried out. The Silverton Tramway Company's business was lost to the South Australian Railways, with the company closing its narrow gauge shortline business, and returning the permanent way to the Crown.

The STC then reinvented itself as a short haul rail operator, servicing the mining industry in and around Broken Hill with two of the 1961 diesel locomotives. Since 1886 the company had hauled some 90 million tonnes of bulk and general freight and 2.8 million passengers.

Sulphide Street station, located in Broken Hill, still stands and its premises is the current Railway and Historical Museum. There, historical pieces of the Silverton Tramway are preserved, including rolling stock and memorabilia. Locomotives situated at the premises include Silverton Tramway W class W24, a Silverton Tramway Y class Y1 and South Australian Railways T class T181, as well as some rolling stock from the New South Wales Government Railways.
