= Tarrawingee =

Tarrawingee may refer to:

- Tarrawingee, New South Wales
- Tarrawingee, Victoria
