= National Railway Museum, Port Adelaide =

Railway museum at Port Adelaide, South Australia

National Railway Museum

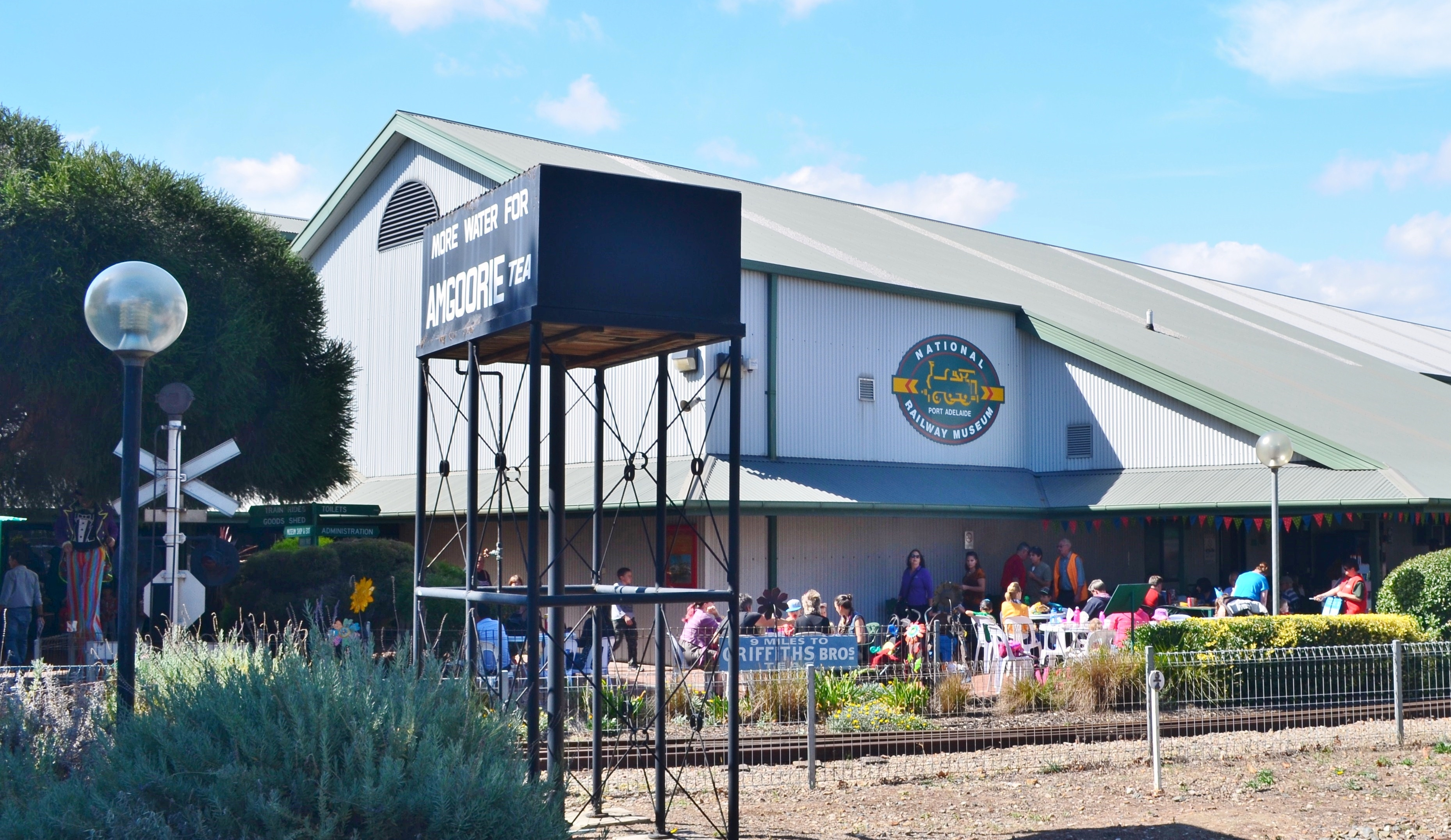
- Part of one of the two large pavilions at the museum
- Established: 1970 (Mile End); 1988 (Port Adelaide)
- Location: 76 Lipson St; Port Adelaide SA 5015; Australia
- Coordinates: 34°50′44″S 138°30′31″E
- Type: Railway museum
- Owner: National Railway Museum Inc.
- Parking: Adjacent
- Website: www.nrm.org.au

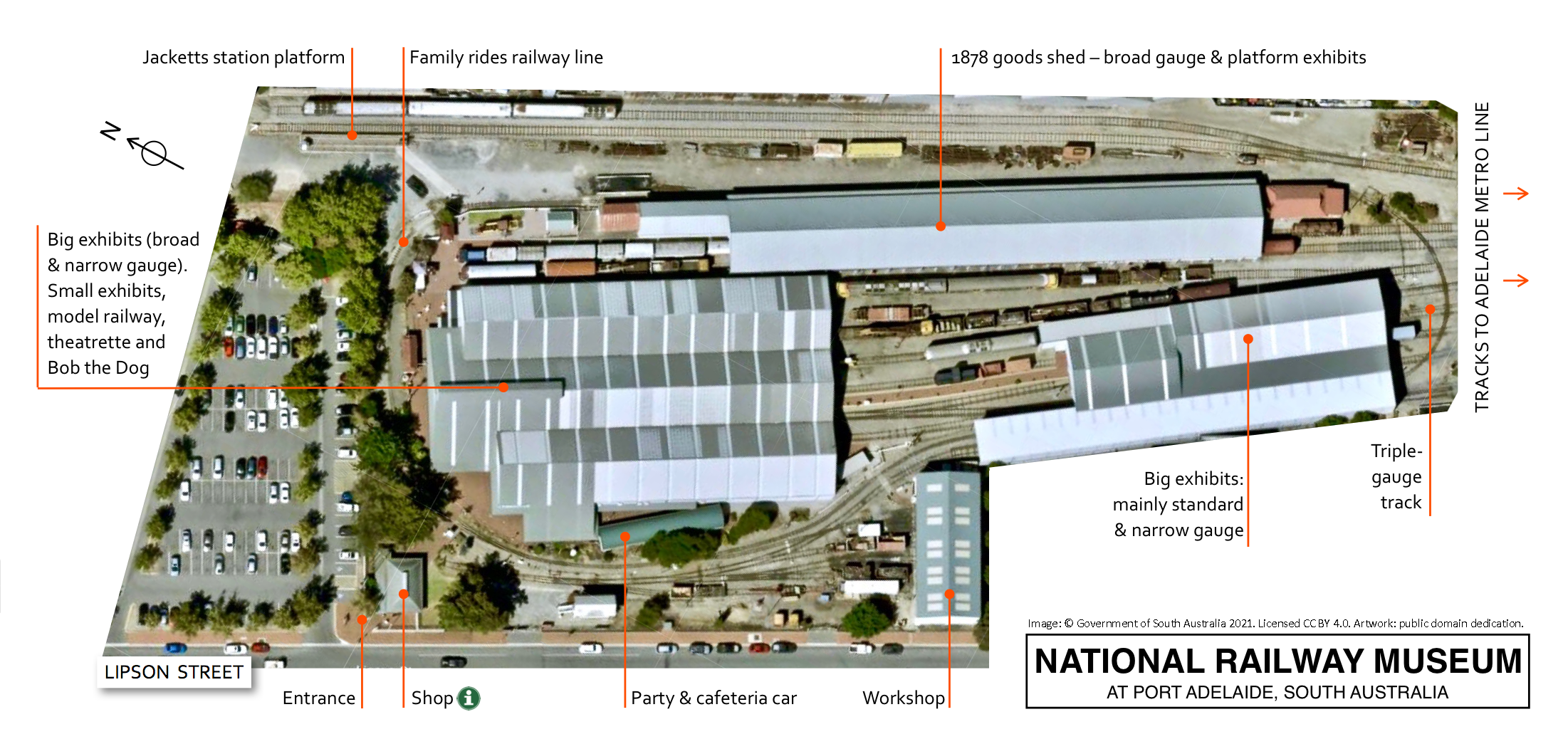
National Railway Museum site in 2021

The National Railway Museum, Port Adelaide, South Australia is the largest under-cover railway museum in Australia. More than 100 major exhibits, mainly from the South Australian Railways (SAR), Commonwealth Railways (CR) and their successor, Australian National (AN), are displayed at its 3.5-hectare (8.6-acre) site. A large archival collection of photographs of those railways and records created by them is also managed by the museum. The museum is a self-funded, registered not-for-profit, volunteer-managed organisation that occasionally receives government grants for special projects. Apart from the duties of three paid staff members, all of its activities are conducted by more than 150 volunteers.

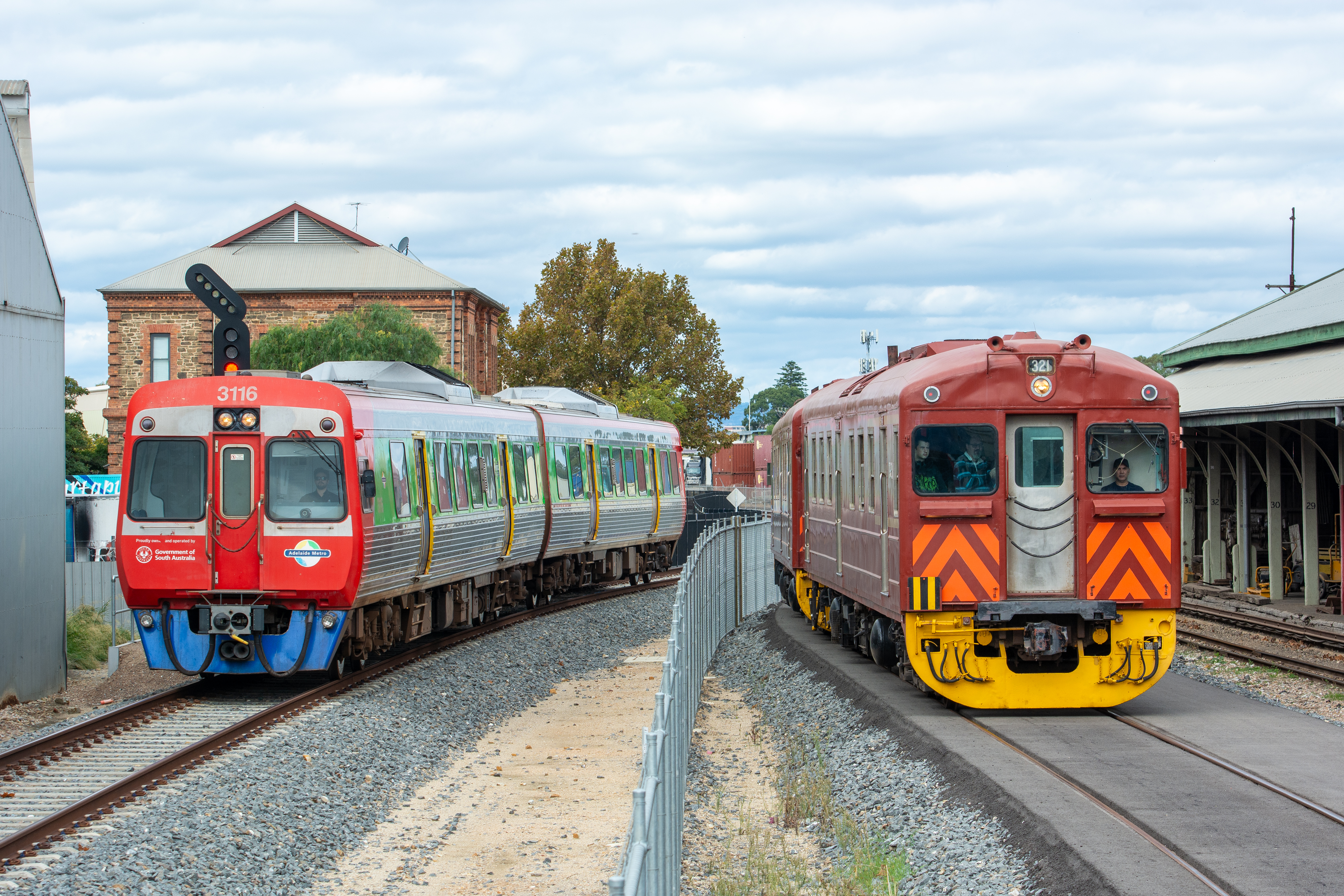
On 10 May 2026, Adelaide Metro 3000 class railcar no. 3116 (left) is about to arrive at the Port Dock railway station on a regular timetable service. Over the National Railway Museum fence, preserved ex-South Australian Railways 300 class "Red Hen" railcar no. 321, on a "special events day" run, is also approaching the museum's platform collocated at the station.

== History ==
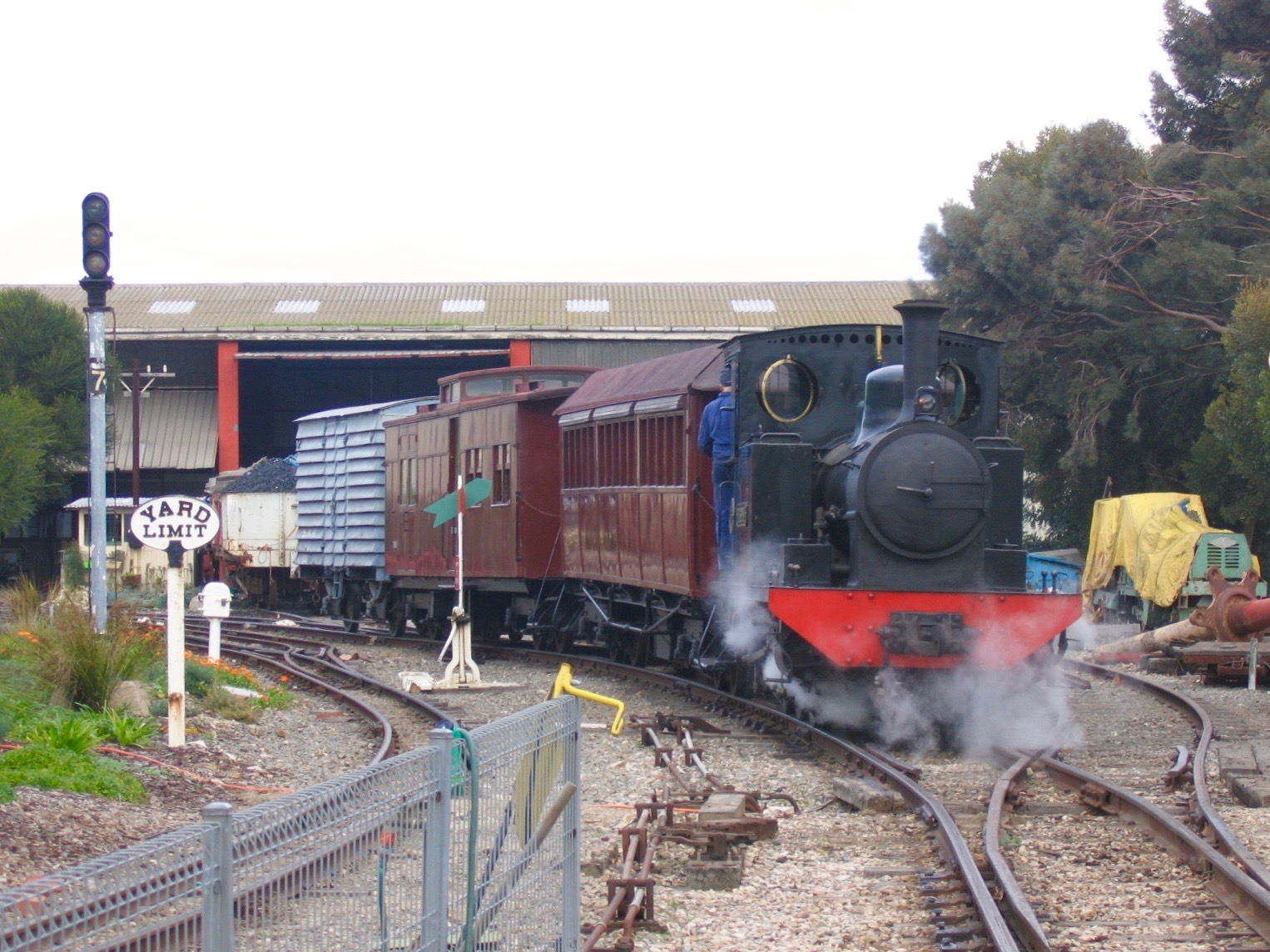
Locomotive Peronne hauls a special train on narrow-gauge – 1067 millimetres (3 feet 6 inches) – track at the museum; track on the left is for miniature train rides around the site.

=== Mile End, 1964–1988 ===
In 1963, a group of rail preservationists, alarmed at the scrapping of steam locomotives which had served South Australia for many decades, set about saving, restoring and maintaining many of the historic vehicles in the Museum today. They asked John Fargher the South Australian Railways Commissioner, to allocate land near the site of the former Mile End locomotive depot to hold their small collection. The first locomotive arrived in 1964 and in 1970 the site opened as the Mile End Railway Museum, albeit on a fully voluntary basis and on only two afternoons a month. Unfortunately, only a few exhibits were under cover and the effects of weather took their toll. An alternative, under-cover venue was sought.

=== Move to Port Adelaide ===
In 1985 the museum, with the involvement of the History Trust of South Australia, obtained a $2 million Australian Bicentenary commemorative grant to redevelop the former Port Dock railway station goods terminal, off Lipson Street, Port Adelaide, as the new museum site. In January 1988, the museum closed at Mile End and 11 months later opened as the Port Dock Station Railway Museum. The facility, with a 4400 square metres (47,000 square feet) pavilion at its core, opened in 2001 housing a representative sample of exhibits from the South Australian Railways, the Commonwealth Railways and their successor, the Australian National Railways Commission. (Note: The Australian National Railways Commission used the trading names, successively: Australian National Railways, Australian National, and AN (the latter being a trademark).)

In 1999, funding was received as part of Australia's Centenary of Federation to provide another, 1980 square metres (21,300 square feet), pavilion housing the increasing number of exhibits from the Commonwealth Railways and its successor. At the 2001 opening, the museum was renamed the National Railway Museum on the initiative of deputy prime minister and noted railway enthusiast, Tim Fischer, AC. (Note: Mr Fischer proposed "national" in view of the multi-jurisdictional scope of the museum's collection and the incorporation of all three of the nation's major railway gauges.)

Subsequently, the main pavilion was named after Ron Fitch, who as South Australian Railways Commissioner had been very supportive, including with the acquisition and transfer of much of the museum's early rolling stock. The Commonwealth Railways pavilion was named after Ron Fluck, the museum's founder.

=== New rail service to the museum ===
In 2017, $16.4 million was allocated in the state budget for a new station to be built near the original site of the Port Dock railway station, at the end of a new 1.0 km (1100 yard) spur line using the existing corridor beside the museum that connects to the Outer Harbor railway line. In June 2019, when some museum track had already been dismantled, the development was paused while a North West Planning Study was conducted; a forecast cost increase to $40 million was cited. On-ground preparatory work was reversed in January 2020.

In June 2023 the project, by then budgeted at $51 million, resumed with partial severing of the direct rail connection to suburban lines, followed by removal of some of the museum's rail siding storage space. A general loss of land in the museum's leaseholding was incurred. The line extension was planned to include a dual-purpose island platform for both regular suburban services and on the other side of the platform during special event days and holidays, broad-gauge heritage trains.

== Collection ==
A 616-page PDF digital publication providing comprehensive details of all National Railway Museum exhibits as of 2026 is under the heading Further reading.

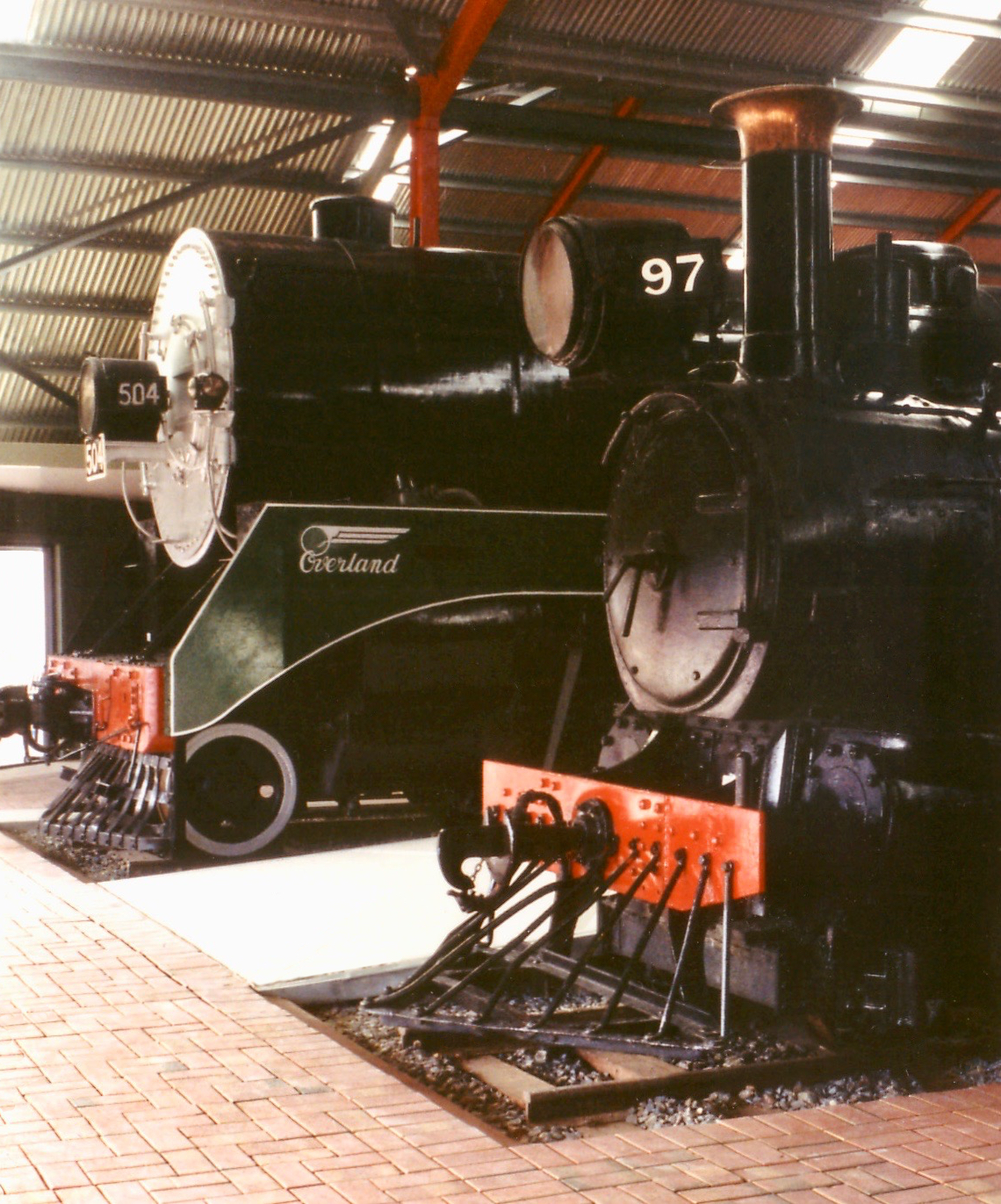
The South Australian Railways owned 129 diminutive Y and Yx class locomotives on its narrow-gauge system from 1885. Beyond Y97 is the broad-gauge 500 ("Mountain") class locomotive number 504, one of 10 introduced in 1926 to haul trains unaided over the Mount Lofty Range. The 500 class was almost 3 times as powerful than the Rx class that it displaced, and 4 1/2 times more powerful than its museum neighbour.

The museum houses its static collection of more than 100 exhibits in the two main pavilions and the historic Port Dock railway station goods shed. All three mainline gauges of Australia are represented: narrow, 1067 mm (3 ft 6 in); standard, 1435 mm (4 ft 8 1/2 in); and broad 1600 mm (5 ft 3 in). Items are mainly preserved from the South Australian Railways, Commonwealth Railways and their successor, the Australian National Railways Commission; printed and photographic records also include material from other state railway administrations. Rolling stock includes famous passenger train vehicles such as those of The Overland, The Ghan, the Trans-Australian and the Tea and Sugar trains. Items from the Silverton Tramway and Victorian Railways are also held.

Operational locomotives and railcars on these gauges are:

- narrow gauge: former Broken Hill Associated Smelters steam locomotive Peronne (1918 Andrew Barclay 0-6-0T tank locomotive)
- broad gauge: former SAR diesel-electric locomotives 515, 703 and 801; "Red Hen" railcars 321 and 400; and "Bluebird" railcar 257.

The museum also operates locomotives, including steam locomotives Bill (with a 2-4-0 wheel arrangement) and Bub (0-4-2 T), for visitor rides on its 457-millimetre (18.0-inch) track around the site.

=== Locomotive and railcar exhibits ===
As of 2026, the museum housed the following items of locomotives and railcars, among other objects:

Steam locomotives

- SAR Rx 93
- SAR Y 97
- SAR P 117
- SAR T 253
- SAR F 255
- SAR 409
- SAR 504 Tom Barr Smith
- SAR 523 Essington Lewis
- SAR 624
- SAR 702
- SAR (ex VR) 752
- CR G 1
- CR NM 34
- Silverton Tramway Y 12
- Silverton Tramway A 21
- Silverton Tramway W 25
- Broken Hill Associated Smelters Peronne
- BHP Whyalla no. 4

Diesel locomotives

- SAR diesel shunter 515 & 517 ←(515 is operational)
- SAR mainline diesel 703 ←(operational)
- SAR diesel shunter 801 ←(operational)
- SAR mainline diesel 900
- SAR mainline diesel 930
- CR GM class GM 2
- CR mainline diesel NSU 61
- CR diesel shunter DE 91

Railcars

- SAR Model 55 Brill railcar no. 8 ←(under major restoration)
- SAR Model 75 Brill railcar no. 41
- SAR Bluebird railcar no. 257, Kestrel ←(operational)
- SAR "Red Hen" railcars nos 321 and 400 ←(operational)
- STA 2000 class railcars nos 2006 and 2112
- CR Budd railcar no. CB 1

== Operations ==
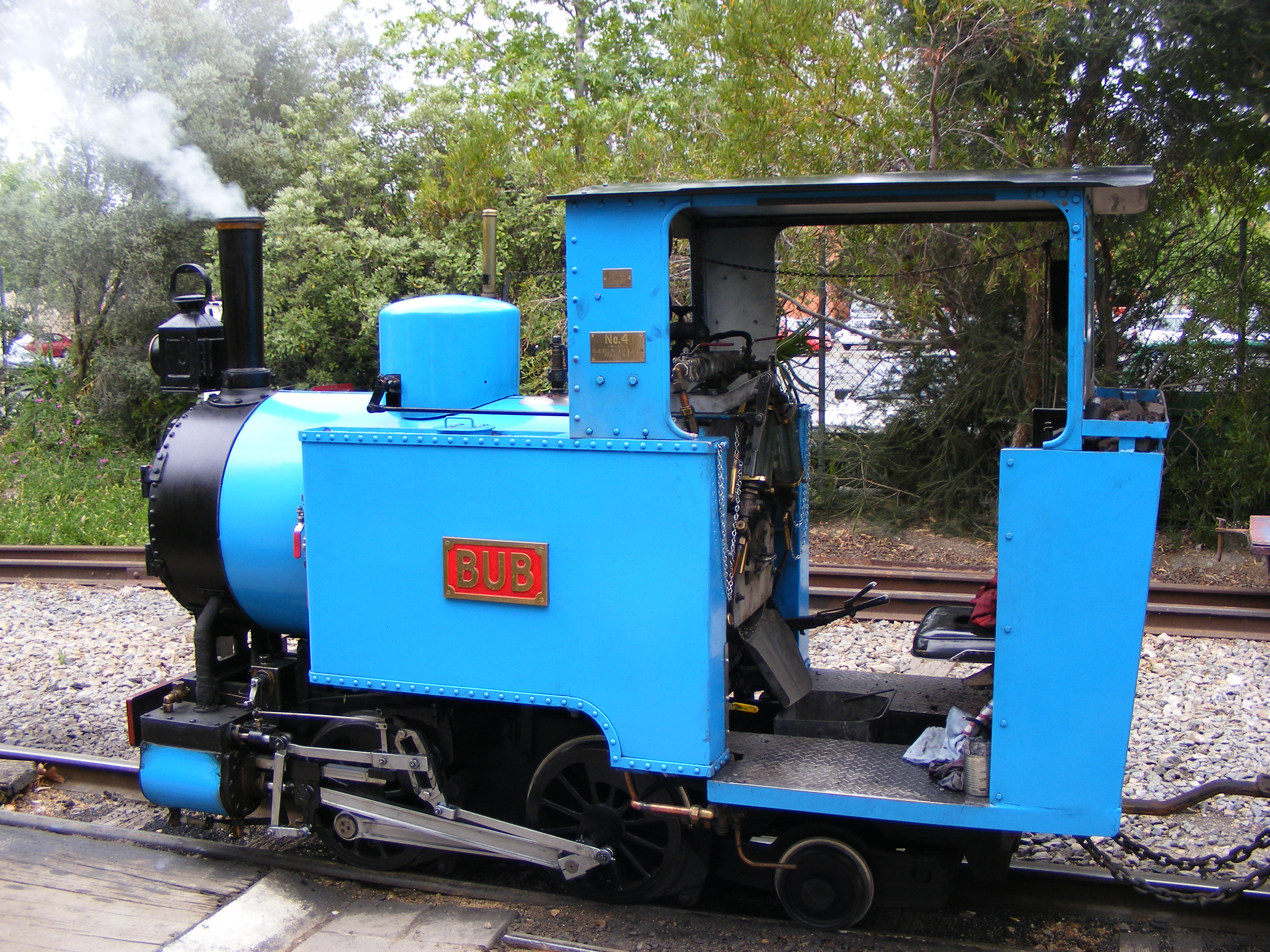
Steam engine Bub, which hauls visitor trains around the museum

During "special event" days, the museum operates various historic locomotives for shunting of rolling stock.

Each day within the museum grounds, a 457 mm (18.0 in) narrow-gauge diesel or steam locomotive gives free rides to visitors (Note: Covered by museum entrance charge.) on a track, 1.2 kilometres (0.75 miles) long, that circles the site.

In 1992, the museum, in cooperation with the Port Adelaide and Enfield Council, built a 1.7 km (1.1 mi) line of the same gauge from Semaphore to Fort Glanville. The line travels along the coastline, through the sand dunes and the Fort Glanville Conservation Park. Trains operate on weekends, public holidays and school holidays from October to April, subject to the morning forecast temperature being less than 33 °C (91 °F).

Since 1982 the museum has published its bi-monthly Catch Point Magazine, a full-colour, A5-format, 48-page magazine that features news and articles about railway operations mainly in South Australia.

== Buildings ==
The museum has a number of historic buildings, some original to the site and others transported for display, including the following:

- Port Dock station goods shed: this is the only remaining intact building of the Port Adelaide (later named Port Dock) station complex. Typical of South Australian Railways structures of the 19th century, architecturally it is an austere industrial building notable for its scale and the use of large timber beams throughout. Its size and scale reflect the economic prosperity of South Australia when it was built, in 1878 – a time when Port Adelaide's facilities were being extended to serve the growing import and export trade. It has been entered in the SA Heritage Register.
- Woodville signal cabin: this two-storey wooden building from suburban Woodville, prominently backing on to Lipson Street, is connected to the narrow gauge yard.
- Callington shelter shed: typical of a type of building provided by the South Australian Railways at small country stations, this shelter shed and minuscule booking office was originally built in 1951 for the then small rural community of Callington, 24 kilometres (15 miles) west of Murray Bridge on the main Adelaide-Melbourne line.
- Eudunda gangers' shed: typical of hundreds of such sheds on the South Australian Railways where track-maintenance gangers and packers held their tools and track inspection trolleys, this example came from Eudunda, 110 kilometres (68 miles) north of Adelaide.

== Gallery ==
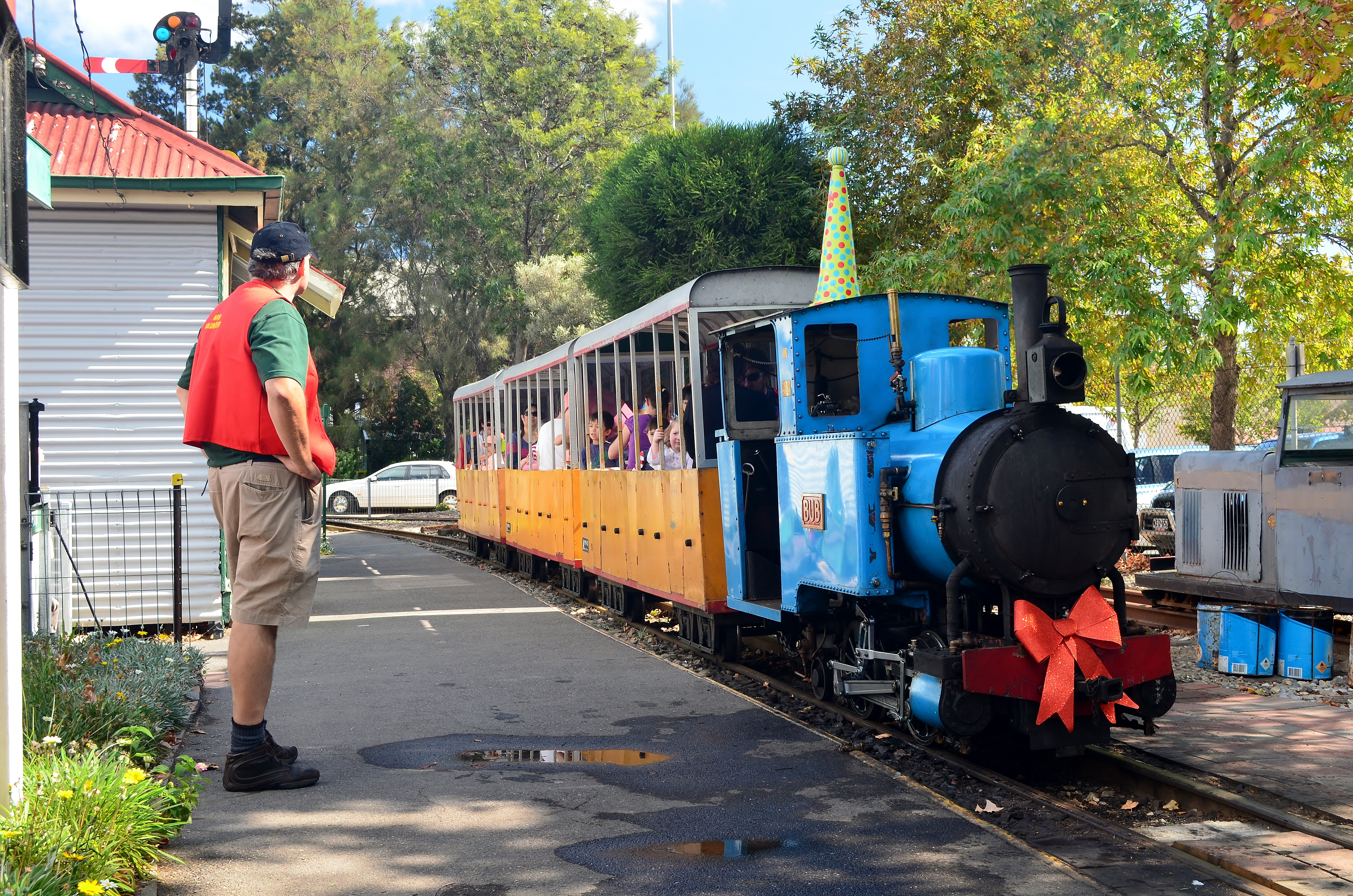
A train on the museum's 1.7 km (1 mi) Semaphore and Fort Glanville Tourist Railway, headed by miniature steam locomotive, Bub

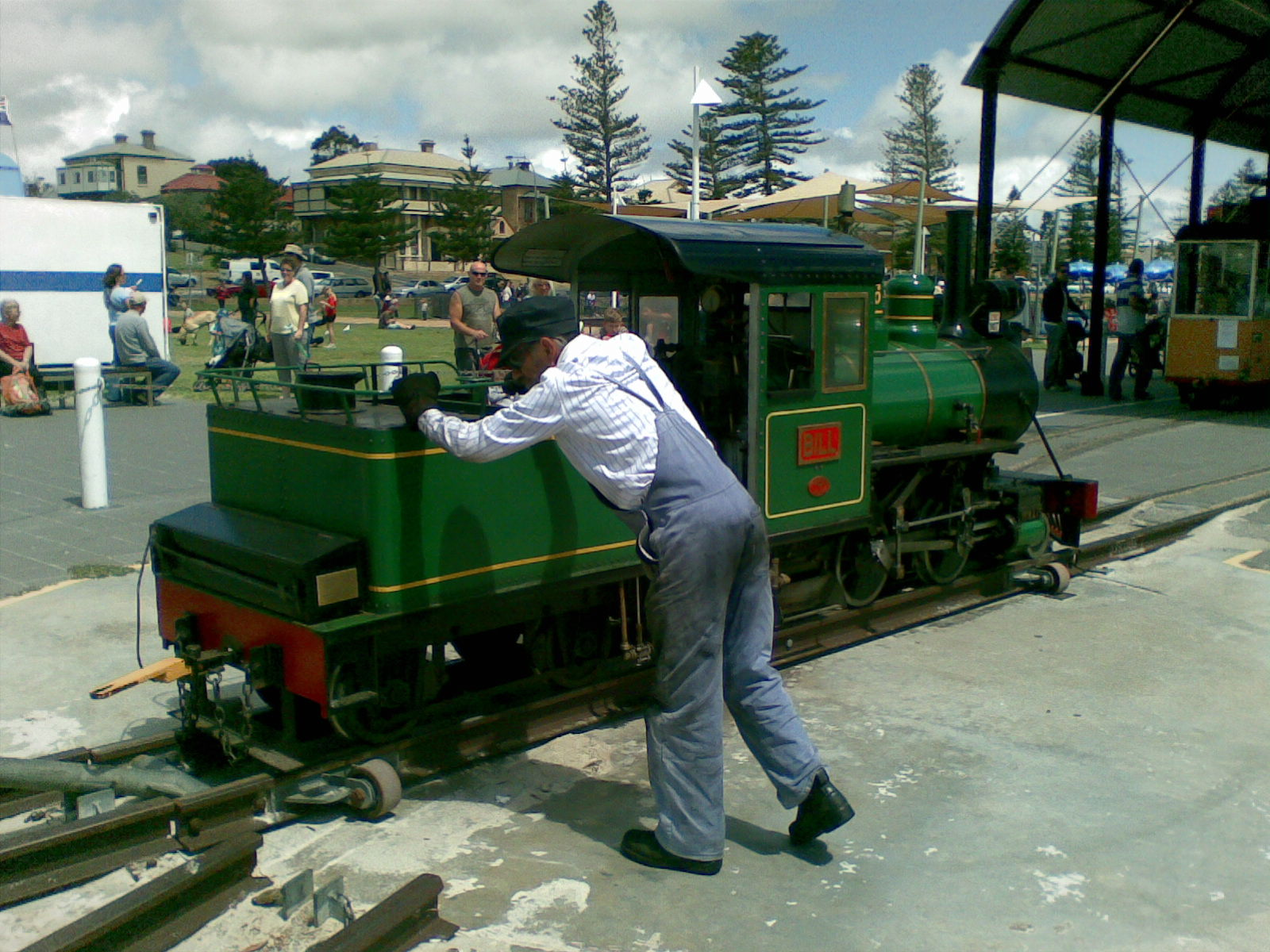
Turning a miniature locomotive on the seafront line at Semaphore

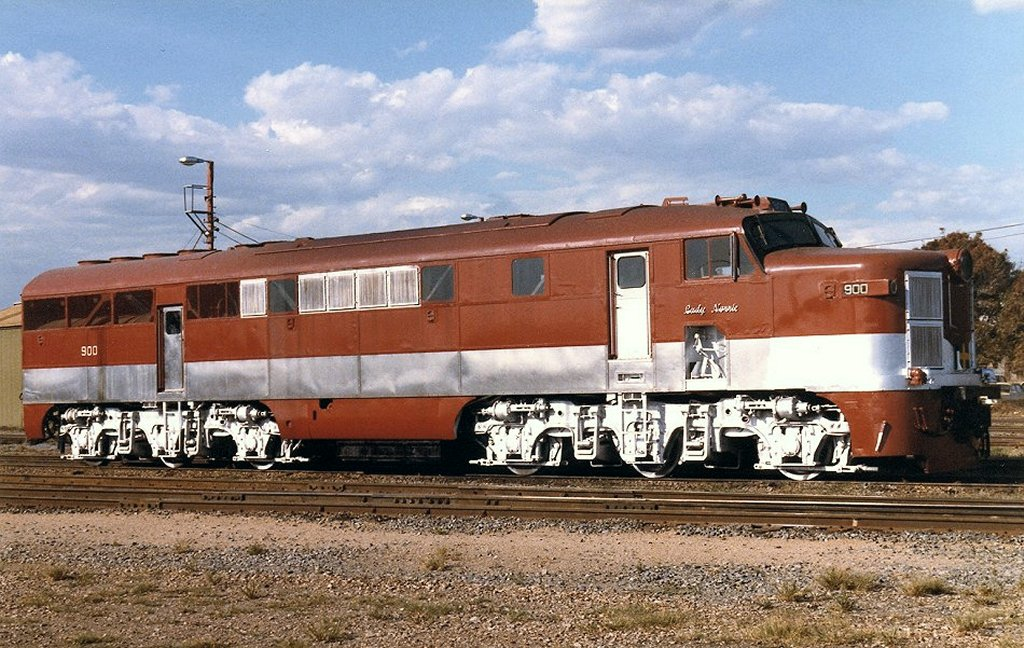
SAR-designed and built diesel-electric locomotive no. 900 ready for transfer to the museum

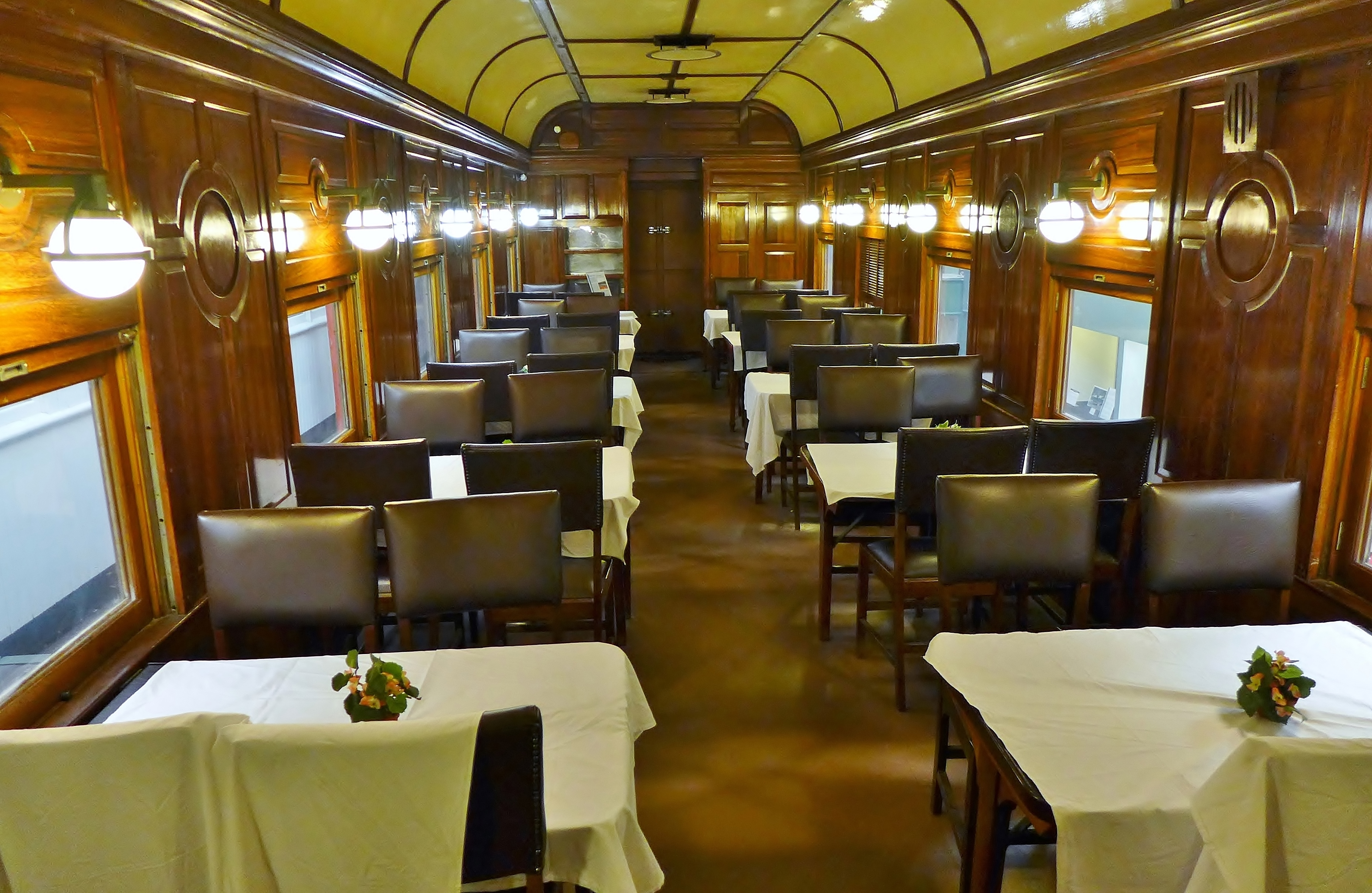
Commonwealth Railways dining car DA 52, which served fine food across the Nullarbor Plain between 1930 and the 1960s

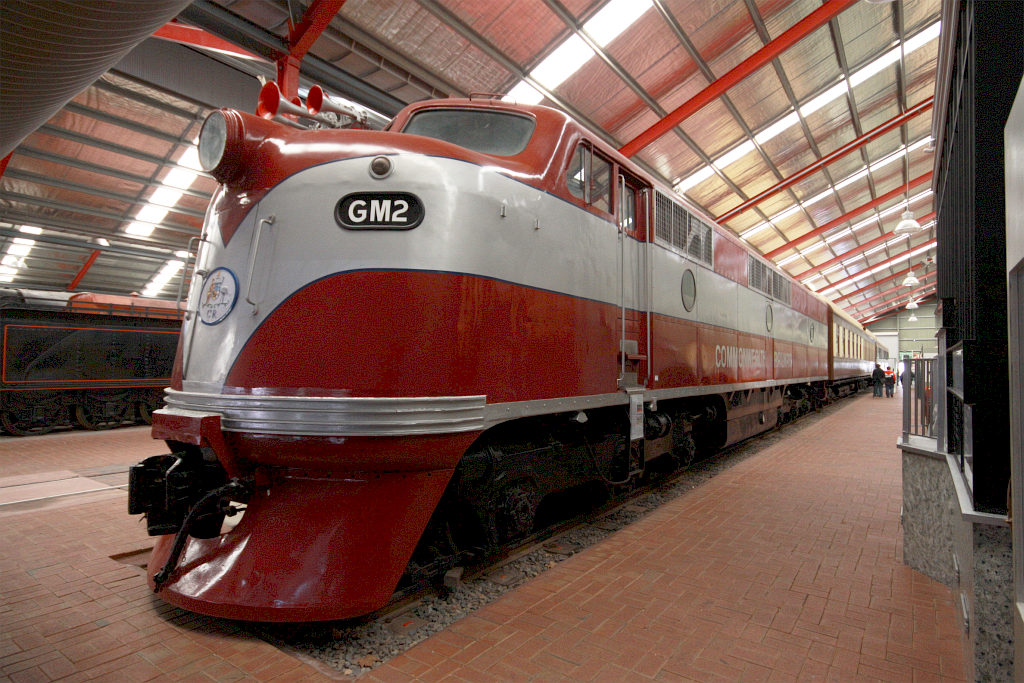
Commonwealth Railways GM class diesel-electric locomotives, such as no. GM2, revolutionised schedules on the Trans-Australian Railway in 1951

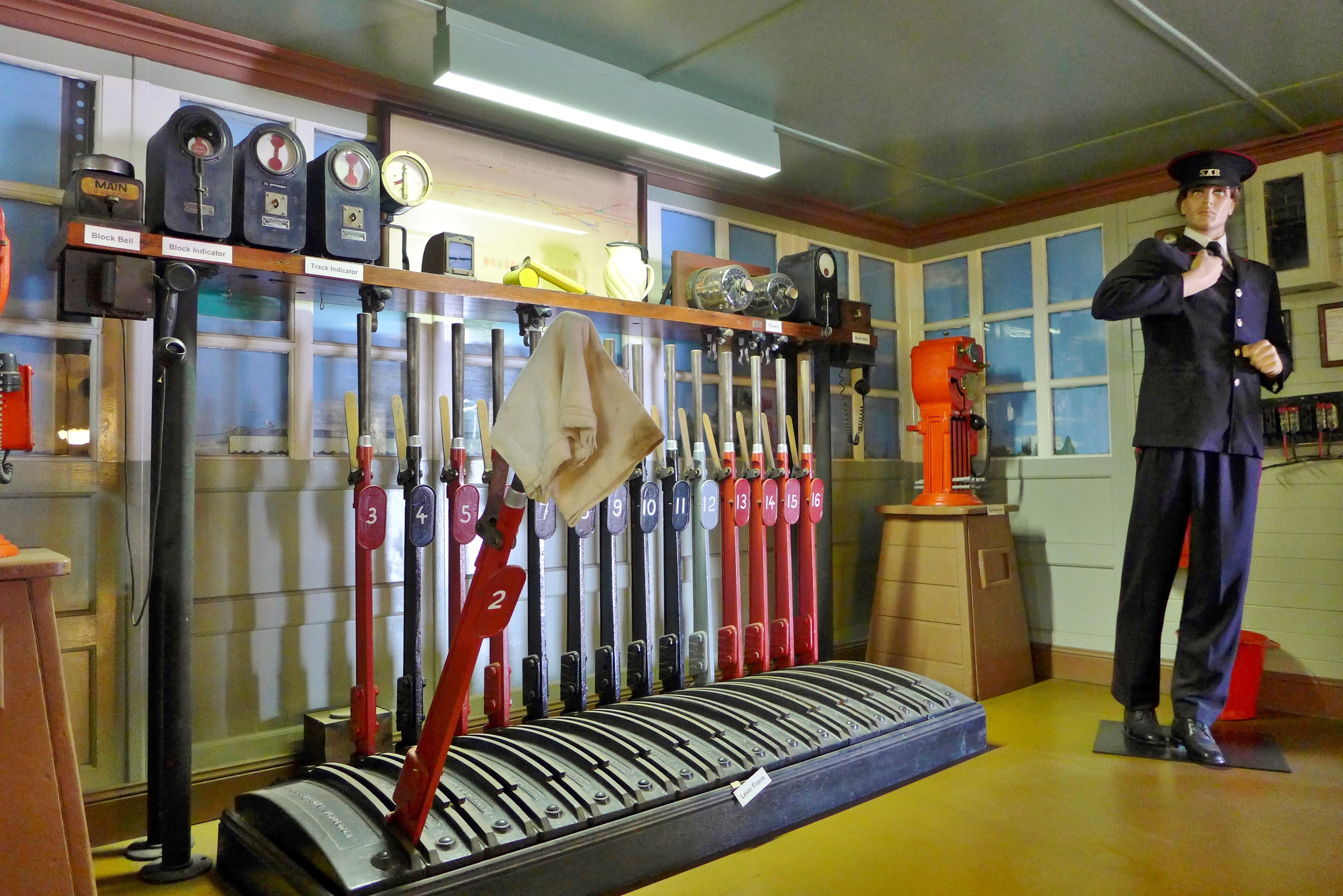
Railway signalling and safeworking display

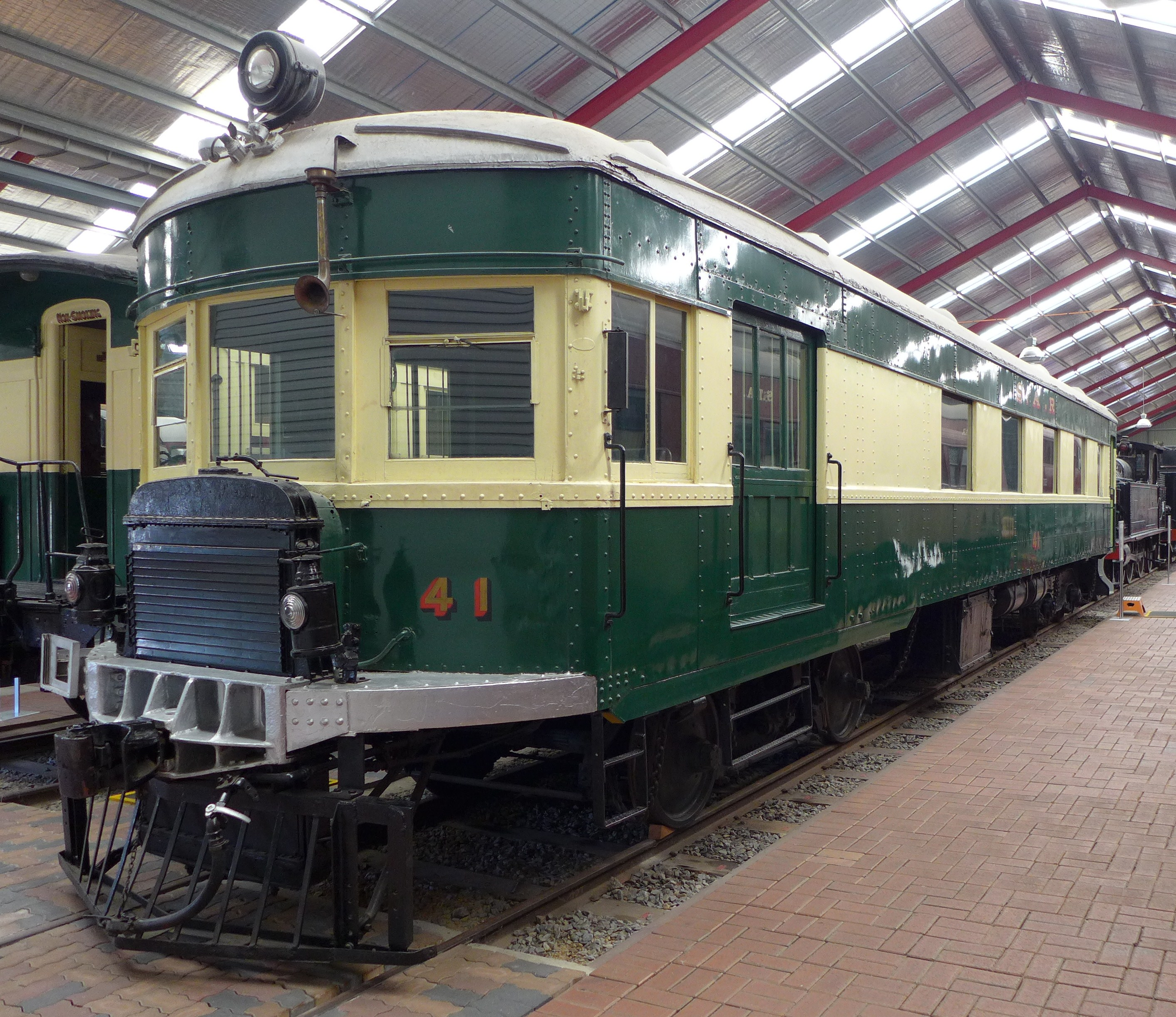
South Australian Railways 75-class railcars, designed by US company Brill, were introduced in 1928 to run on suburban and country lines alike

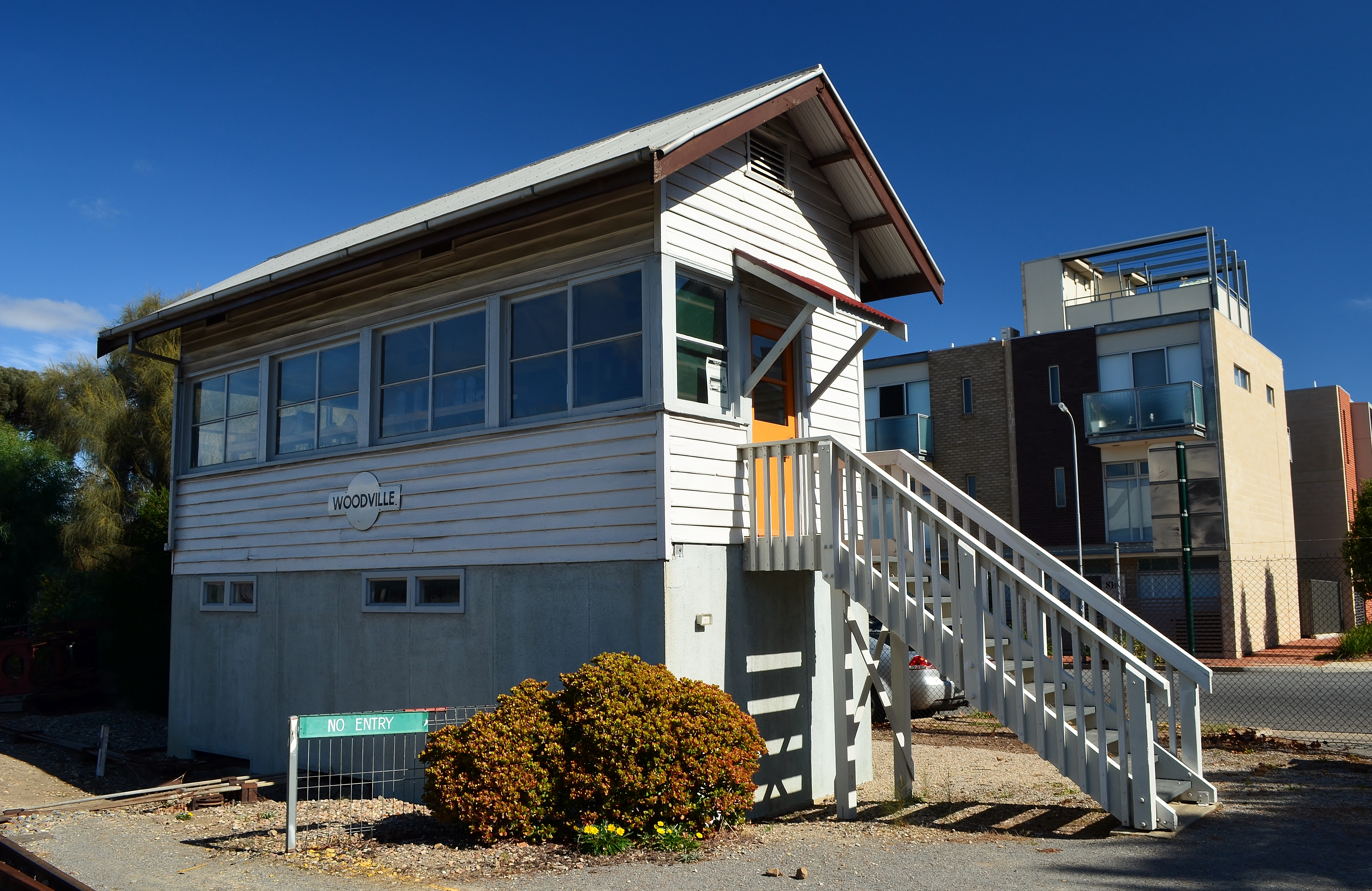
The relocated Woodville signal cabin

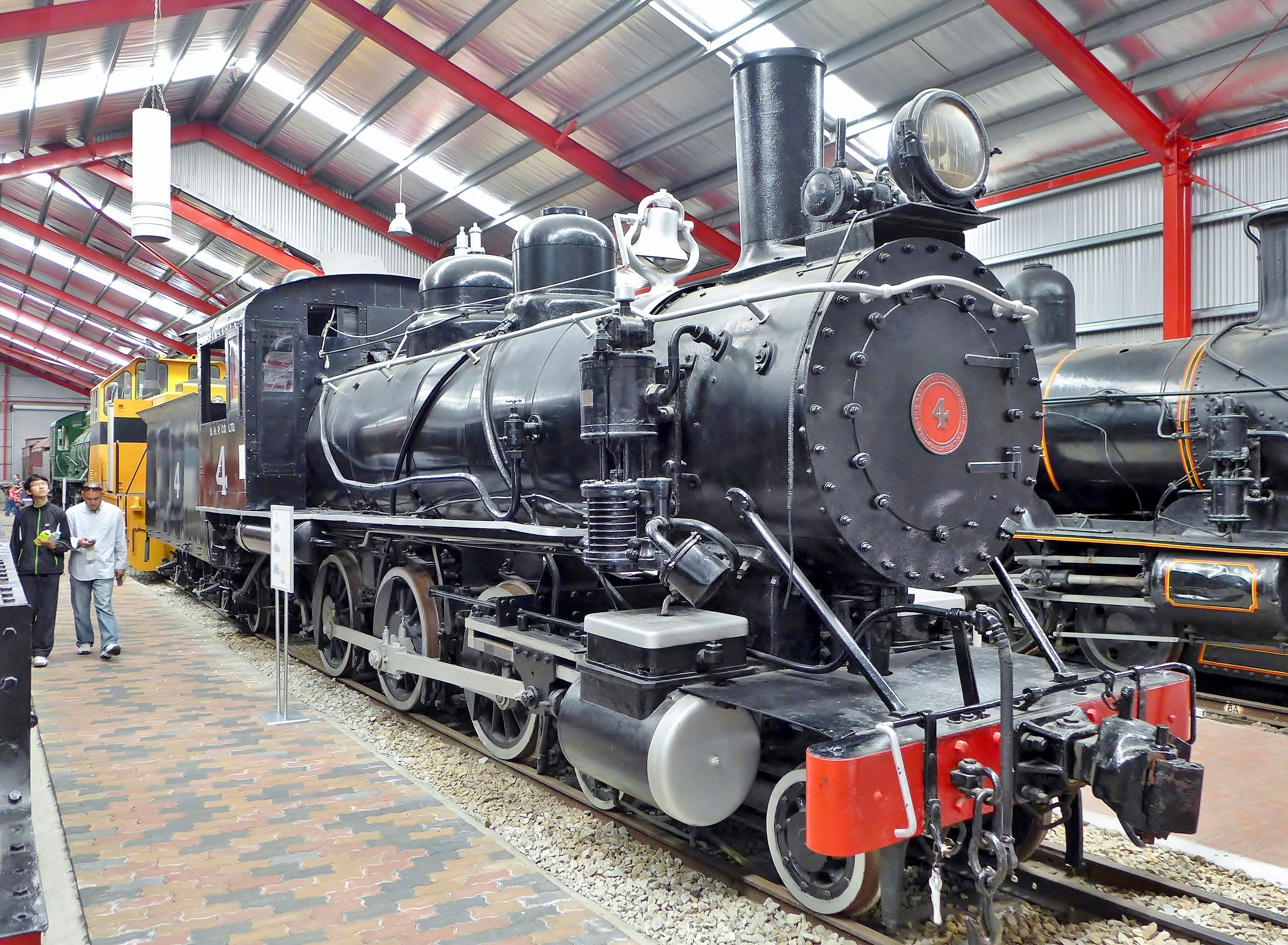
1914-built locomotive no. 4, which hauled BHP iron ore trains from Iron Knob to Whyalla

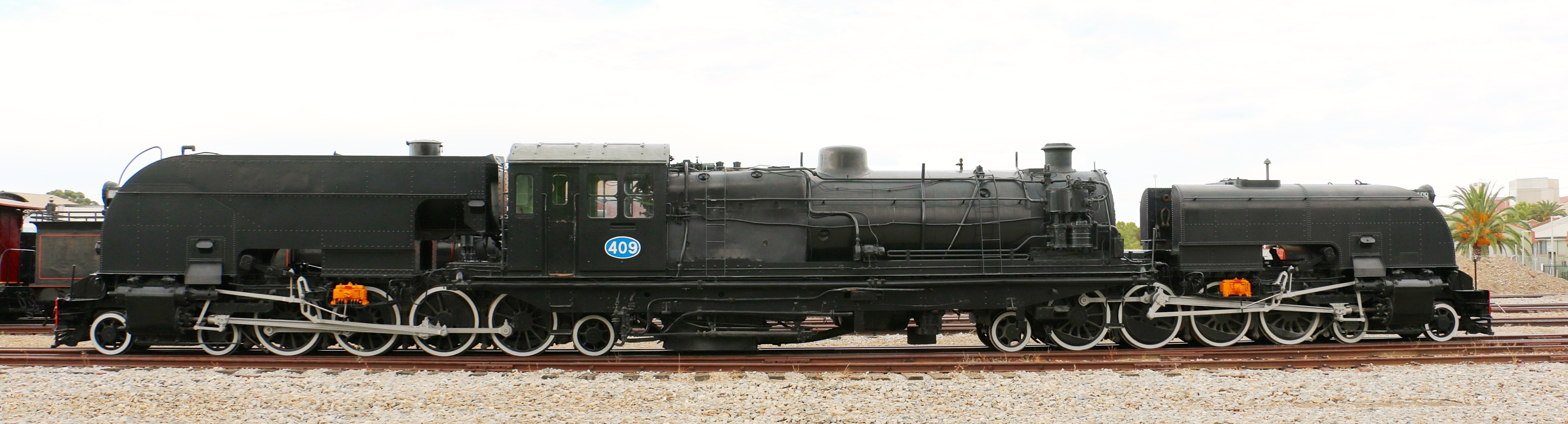
Narrow-gauge Beyer-Garratt 400 class locomotive no. 409 was one of ten introduced in 1952 to haul silver-lead-zinc ore mined at Broken Hill to Port Pirie

== See also ==
- List of railway museums
