= South Australian Railways T class =

4-8-0 locomotive of the former South Australian Railways

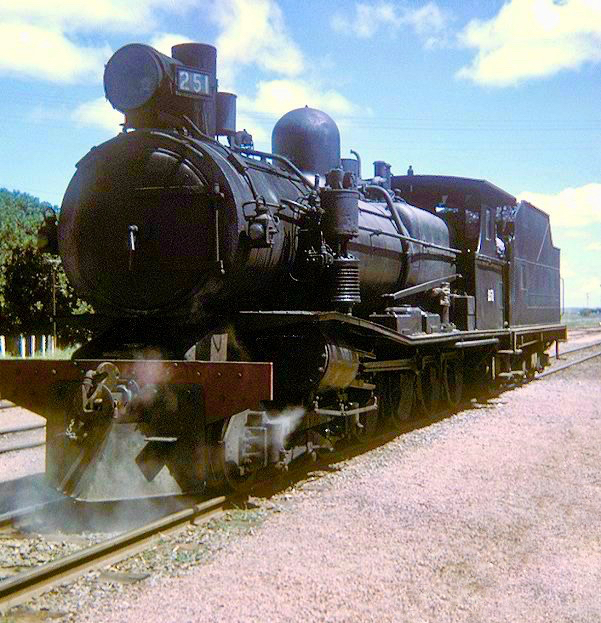
- T251 at Jamestown in 1967
Type and origin
- Power type: Steam
- Builder: Islington Workshops; James Martin & Co; Walkers Limited
- Build date: 1903–1917
- Total produced: 78
Specifications
- Configuration
  - Whyte: 4-8-0
- Gauge: 1067 mm (3 ft 6 in)
- Leading dia.: 2 ft 6 in (762 mm)
- Driver dia.: 3 ft 7 in (1092 mm)
- Length: 52 ft 11 in (16.129 m)
- Height: 11 ft 7 1/4 in (3.537 m)
- Total weight: 78 long tons 8 cwt (175,600 lb or 79.7 t)
- Fuel type: Coal
- Fuel capacity: 8 long tons 0 cwt (17,900 lb or 8.1 t)
- Water cap.: 2,500 imp gal (11,000 L; 3,000 US gal)
- Firebox
  - Grate area: 109 sq ft (10.1 m^{2})
- Boiler pressure: 185 psi (1,276 kPa)
- Heating surface: 939 sq ft (87.2 m^{2})
- Superheater
  - Heating area: 136 sq ft (12.6 m^{2})
- Cylinders: 2 outside
- Cylinder size: 16.5 in × 22 in (419 mm × 559 mm)
- Valve gear: Stephenson
- Valve type: Piston
Performance figures
- Tractive effort: 21,904 lbf (97.43 kN)
- Factor of adh.: 3.54
Career
- Operators: South Australian Railways and Tasmanian Government Railways
- Class: T and Tx
- Number in class: 78
- Numbers: T23–T24, T44–T48, T50-T51, T180-T186, T197–T258
- First run: 13 February 1903
- Last run: 1970
- Preserved: T181, T186, T199, T224, T251, T253
- Disposition: 6 preserved, 72 scrapped

The South Australian Railways T class is a class of seventy-eight 1067 mm (3 ft 6 in) narrow-gauge 4-8-0 steam locomotives operated by the South Australian Railways. Several were sold to the Tasmanian Government Railways; some others operated on the Commonwealth Railways. Five were converted to operate on 1600 mm (5 ft 3 in) broad-gauge lines.

== History ==
Between 1903 and 1917, the South Australian Railways (SAR) placed 78 T class locomotives into service. They were built by Islington Railway Workshops (4), James Martin & Co, Gawler (34) and Walkers Limited, Maryborough (40). They were initially deployed to work on the narrow-gauge lines between Cockburn (on the Broken Hill line), and between Terowie, Peterborough and Port Pirie. Later, they operated across the SAR narrow-gauge network, including on the isolated Port Lincoln Division.

The T class were versatile: although designed for freight and ore traffic, the class was also used on so-called "express" passenger services, including the East-West passenger service connecting with the Trans-Australian via Quorn until 1937, and on mixed (combined passenger and freight) services and shunting.

For more than 50 years the T class the backbone of the SAR's narrow-gauge motive power. As smaller SAR narrow-gauge locomotives were withdrawn in the 1920s, the T class became dominant until the early 1950s, when they were gradually superseded by the 400 class Garratt locomotives on the Barrier ore traffic and, in the 1960s, by 830 class diesel-electrics. The need to convert the latter locomotives from narrow to standard gauge in readiness for the opening of the new Broken Hill line resulted in many of the steam locomotives being released from storage to haul ore trains in 1968–69.

== Design and modifications ==
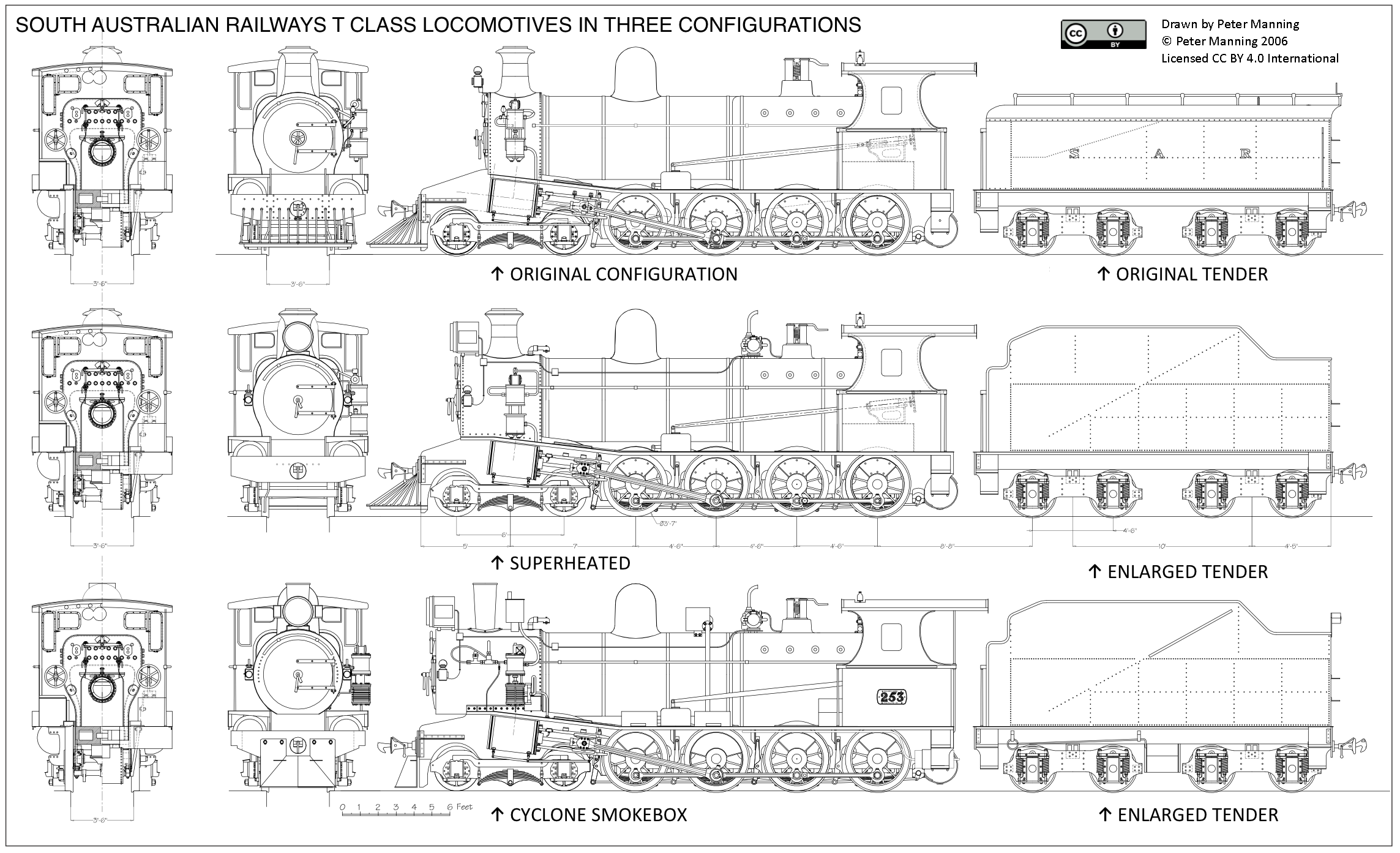
The T class's three main configurations over time

During their life, T class locomotives were improved with additional equipment, resulting in dramatic visual changes from the original, well-proportioned locomotive with clean lines to a form that appeared much larger and more purposeful if not slightly eccentric. The locomotives' features were based on the successful but smaller Y class. Although designed and first built at the SAR's Islington Works, their styling reflected the strong influence of Beyer, Peacock and Company, the British designers and builders of the railway's earlier narrow-gauge classes. They had steel plate frames, Stephenson valve gear between them, piston valves, and two outside cylinders. The front section of the footplate was inclined, enabling it to clear the inclined cylinders. The locomotive itself adopted a somewhat British appearance with its clean parallel Belpaire boiler, ornate copper-topped chimney, inclined cylinders and a single large steam dome. Later on, its appearance became more utilitarian. Equipment was fitted to the top of the boiler and footplate, the chimneys were replaced with a plain "stovepipe" version, and the pilots (cowcatchers), originally made from tubes, were replaced with steel plate versions. The additional equipment included headlamp, Westinghouse air brake pump, snifter valve, blowdown muffler, air compressor exhaust muffler, re-railing jacks, larger sandboxes, and eight lead adhesion blocks (weights fitted to the footplates). The smokebox was extended in two stages to, first, accommodate a superheater header and, later, a front-end cyclone spark arrestor. All but two T class locomotives received the final extension, giving them a characteristically ungainly, "front-heavy" appearance. The greatly increased height of the extended tender sides and fuel oil tank that towered over the cab produced an appearance distinctly different from the original version.

== Deployment to other railways ==
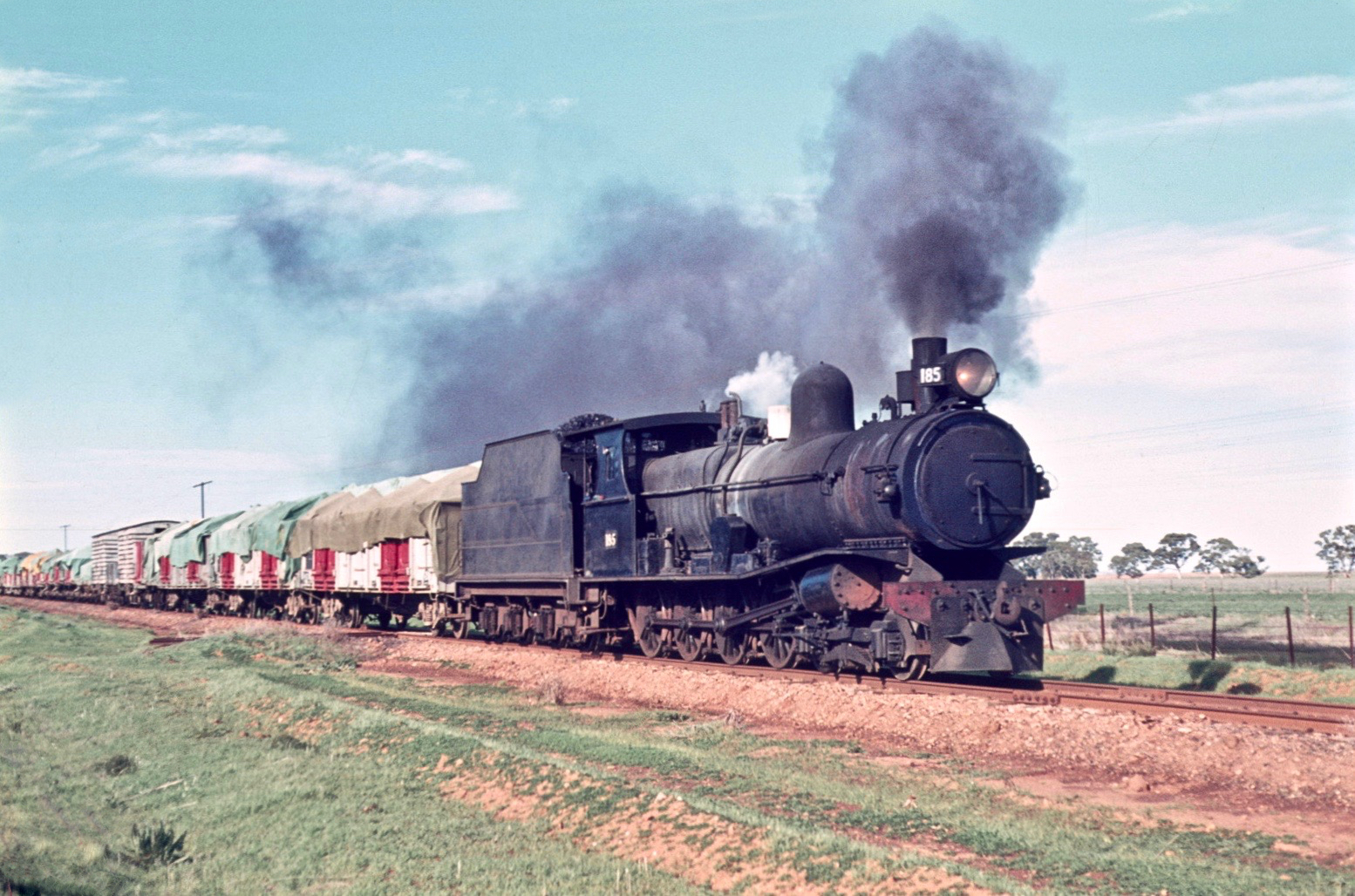
In 1969, the year before narrow-gauge traffic ended in the Mid North, T class locomotive no. 185 was hauling grain vehicles on the Wilmington railway line

In 1920–21, six were sold to the Tasmanian Government Railways, retaining their T class classification; they were withdrawn between 1957 and 1961.

In 1922–23, five were converted at Islington Works from 1067 mm (3 ft 6 in) to 1600 mm (5 ft 3 in) gauge to run on the lightly laid Murraylands branch lines out of Tailem Bend; they were reclassified as the Tx class. In 1949 all were converted back to narrow gauge. Between 1925 and 1939 all remaining 78 locomotives were upgraded to superheated boilers.

During the Second World War, four T class locomotives were sold to the Commonwealth Railways and reclassified as the NMA class. However, the agreement was almost immediately reversed in favour of hiring 32 T class locomotives to operate from Terowie and Quorn to Alice Springs on the Central Australia Railway. Commonwealth Railways employees crewed the locomotives and the SAR undertook servicing and maintenance. Hiring continued post-war for the clean-up of military equipment and removal of wartime infrastructure on the Alice Springs line. T class locomotives were also hired for the Leigh Creek coal traffic until the completion of the Port Augusta to Brachina section of the Marree standard gauge line in 1956.

For some time after 1954, the T class locomotives were regularly scheduled to double-head The Ghan northbound from Quorn complemented by a single NSU class diesel-electric locomotive. This operation extended as far as Telford, where the T class was detached and returned on a double-headed Leigh Creek coal train, usually with another T class. In 1956, a new standard-gauge line to Telford opened and the narrow-gauge line was severed, extending only as far as Hawker. Leigh Creek coal and other traffic was thereafter transported over the standard gauge. After January 1961, the Commonwealth Railways hired T class locomotives to operate over the 66 kilometres (41 miles) Quorn-to-Hawker route – an arrangement that continued until the last revenue movement on the line in January 1970. At the same time the last were withdrawn from the Broken Hill line when it was converted to standard gauge.

== Preserved locomotives ==
As of 2022, six T class locomotives were preserved – of which four were on static display, T186 was being overhauled and T251 was operational:

Number	Owner	Status	Location
T181	Sulphide Street Railway and Historical Museum	Static display outdoors	Broken Hill, NSW
T186	Pichi Richi Railway	Under overhaul for eventual return to operation	Quorn, SA
T199	District Council of Peterborough	Static display indoors	Steamtown Heritage Rail Centre, Peterborough, SA
T224	National Trust of South Australia	Static display under cover	Millicent Museum, SA
T251	Bellarine Railway	Operational	Queenscliff, Victoria
T253	History Trust of South Australia	Static display indoors	National Railway Museum, Port Adelaide, SA
