= Silverton Tramway Y class =

Steam locomotive of the Silverton Tramway, Australia

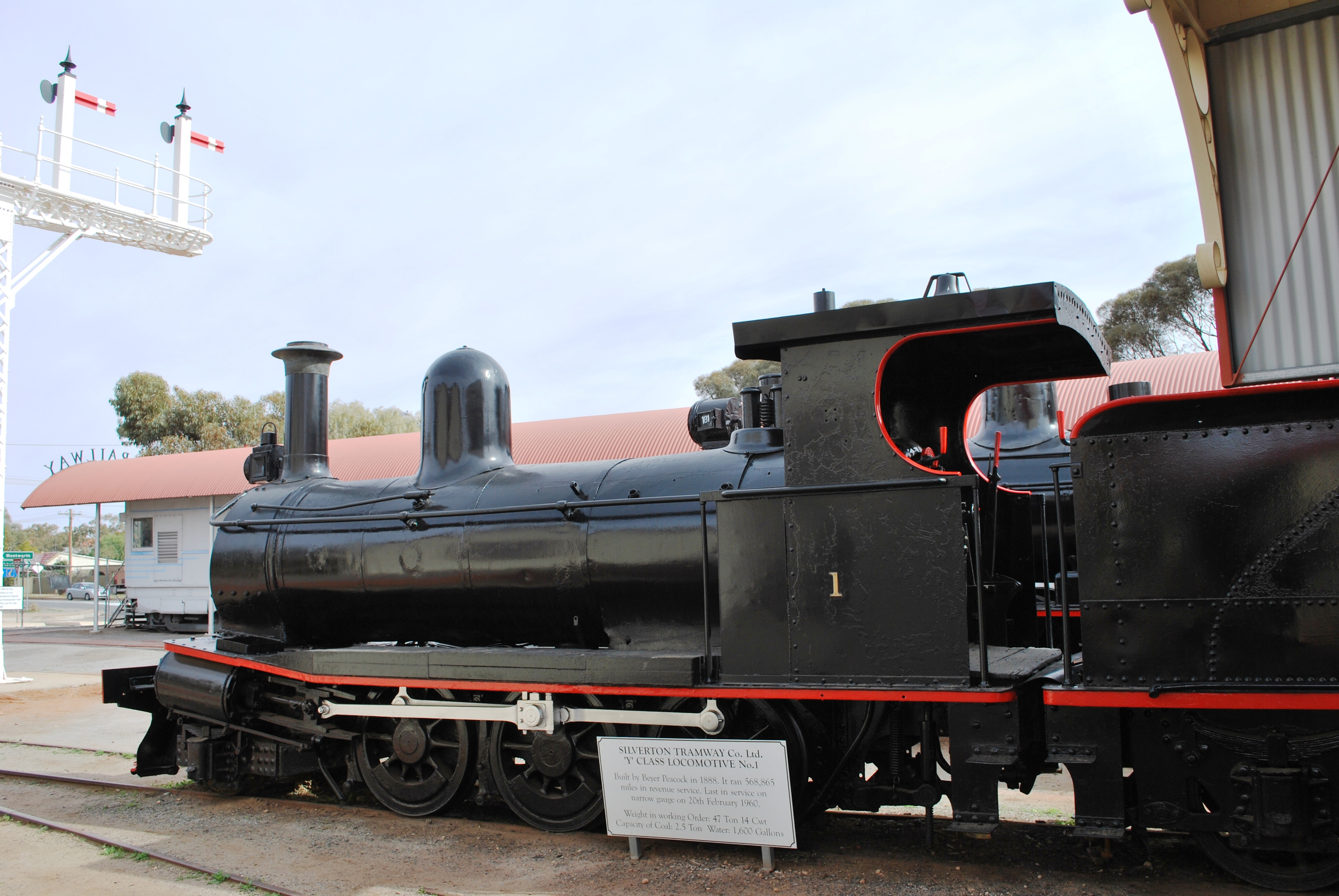
- Y1 preserved at Sulphide Street Museum, 2009
Type and origin
- Power type: Steam
- Builder: Beyer, Peacock & Co; James Martin & Co
- Build date: 1888–1907
- Total produced: 21
Specifications
- Configuration
  - Whyte: 2-6-0 (19 locos), 2-6-2T (2 locos)
- Gauge: 1067 mm (3 ft 6 in)
- Driver dia.: 3 ft 3 in (991 mm)
- Length: 40 ft 0 in (12.19 m)
- Loco weight: 2–6–2T: 34 long tons 0 cwt (76,200 lb or 34.5 t)
- Total weight: 2–6–0: 47 long tons 7 cwt (106,100 lb or 48.1 t)
- Fuel type: Coal
- Water cap.: 2–6–0: 1,600 imp gal (7,300 L; 1,900 US gal); 2–6–2T: 600 imp gal (2,700 L; 720 US gal)
- Tender cap.: 2–6–0: 4 long tons 10 cwt (10,100 lb or 4.6 t) (2–6–2T had no tender)
- Firebox
  - Grate area: 13.6 sq ft (1.26 m^{2})
- Boiler pressure: 2–6–0: 145 lbf/in^{2} (1.00 MPa); 2–6-0 rebuilt: 180 lbf/in^{2} (1.24 MPa); 2–6–2T: 140 lbf/in^{2} (0.97 MPa)
- Cylinder size: 14.25 in × 20 in (362 mm × 508 mm)
Performance figures
- Tractive effort: 2–6–0: 13,289 lbf (59.11 kN); 2–6–0 rebuilt: 16,500 lbf (73.40 kN); 2–6–2T: 12,154 lbf (54.06 kN)
- Factor of adh.: 3.29
Career
- Operators: Silverton Tramway Company
- Numbers: Y1–Y17
- Preserved: Y1, Y6, Y11, Y12
- Disposition: 4 preserved, 17 scrapped

The Silverton Tramway Y class is a class of 2-6-0 and 2-6-2T steam locomotives of the Silverton Tramway Company, operating between Broken Hill, New South Wales, and the border of South Australia.

== History ==
Between 1888 and 1907 the Silverton Tramway Company took delivery of eighteen 2-6-0 and two 2-6-2T locomotives from Beyer, Peacock & Co, Manchester, and two built by James Martin & Co purchased second-hand from the Tarrawingee Tramway.

The company notionally had 21 Y class locomotives, although three were never operated and only a maximum of 17 were owned at any one time. Their road numbers were recycled.

In 1887, having commenced operations with hired South Australian Railways Y class locomotives, the company ordered four locomotives of the same design from Beyer, Peacock. They were assembled in Gawler, South Australia by James Martin's Phoenix Foundry. Since the company had an option to sell to the South Australian Railways any that it deemed surplus, two of the locomotives ("1st Y3" and "1st Y4") passed without use. Of the other two, which were 2-6-2T (side tank) locomotives but otherwise the same as the 2-6-0 locomotives, one was sold within a few months; the other was given away as compensation for a collision 11 years later.

Westinghouse air brakes were fitted to Y13, Y15 and Y16 from new and Y1 and Y11 were retrofitted. Y1, Y6, Y8 and Y11 to Y17, which originally had a boiler pressure of 145 pounds per square inch (1000 kilopascals; 10.2 kilograms-force per square centimetre), were rebuilt with 180 pounds per square inch (1200 kilopascals; 13 kilograms-force per square centimetre) boilers and lead adhesion slabs were added to the running boards. Three were superheated between 1924 and 1926.

The locomotives were superseded on main line duties by the A class from 1912 onwards, but many were retained for shunting and secondary duties around the Broken Hill yards and mine sidings. The last was withdrawn in 1961.

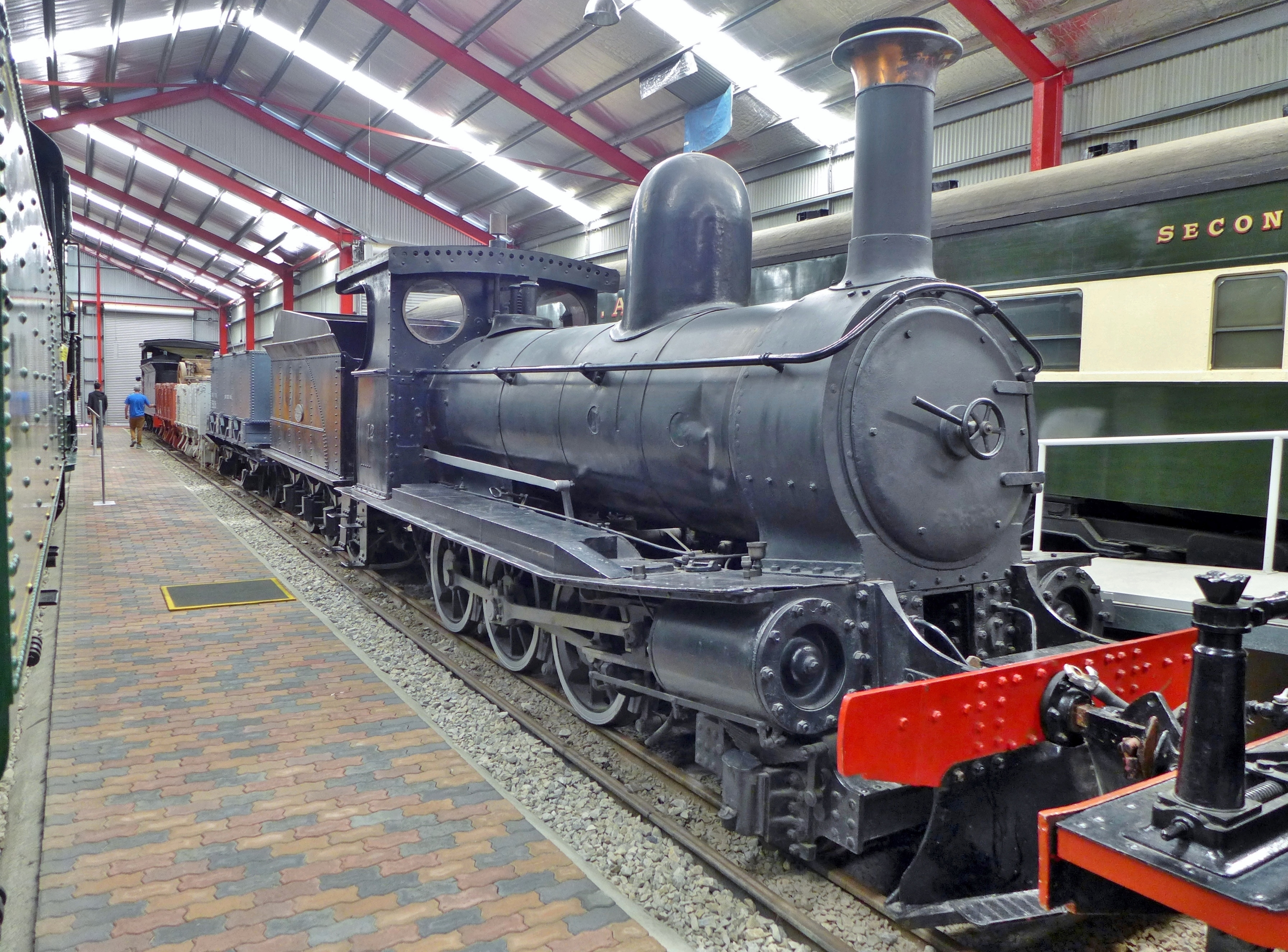
Y12 at the National Railway Museum, Port Adelaide

== Disposition ==
The locomotives' disposition as of 2015 is shown in the table.

Number	Wheel arrangement	Builder	Builder's number	Year built	Withdrawn	Notes
Y1	2-6-0	Beyer, Peacock & Co	2971	1888	12 February 1960	Semi-bogie tender. Stored at Railway Town, put on display at Sulphide Street Museum in late 1970s.
Y2	2-6-0	Beyer, Peacock & Co	2972	1888	15 June 1943	Semi-bogie tender. Sold to BHP, Whyalla 1945.
Y3 (1st)	2-6-0	Beyer, Peacock & Co	2973	1888	N/A	Semi-bogie tender. Sold to South Australian Railways without use November 1888 as Y90.
Y3 (2nd)	2-6-0	James Martin & Co	16	1891	28 February 1931	Purchased from Tarrawingee Tramway 1892, scrapped 1937
Y4 (1st)	2-6-0	Beyer, Peacock & Co	2974	1888	N/A	Semi bogie tender. Sold to South Australian Railways without use 7 November 1888 as Y91
Y4 (2nd)	2-6-0	Beyer, Peacock & Co	3397	1891	1907	Sold to South Mine Broken Hill 1907, later transferred to BHP Whyalla as 3A
Y5 (1st)	2-6-2T	Beyer, Peacock & Co	3170	1890	1898	Forwarded to Sulphide Corporation Central Mine as compensation for one of their locomotives destroyed in a head-on accident with a Silverton locomotive. Transferred to BHP Whyalla as 2A in 1940, withdrawn late 1950s.
Y5 (2nd)	2-6-0	Beyer, Peacock & Co	4391	1901	8 April 1931	Scrapped 1938
Y6 (1st)	2-6-2T	Beyer, Peacock & Co	3357	1891	N/A	Never owned by Silverton: ordered by BHP and landed in Adelaide August 1891 but too heavy for tracks so entered service with South Australian Railways (SAR) in exchange for V class no. 11. In March 1893, the SAR lent it to STC as Y6. Entered service with BHP Broken Hill September 1893, transferred to BHP Whyalla in 1901 as no. 3, withdrawn 1963 and displayed on Whyalla foreshore, moved to Mount Laura Homestead Museum, Whyalla Norrie in 1983.
Y6 (2nd)	2-6-0	Beyer, Peacock & Co	3795	1895	7 October 1960	Scrapped July 1963
Y7	2-6-0	Beyer, Peacock & Co	3515	1892	14 October 1929	Scrapped 1934 or 1937
Y8	2-6-0	Beyer, Peacock & Co	3516	1892	27 May 1960	Scrapped July 1963
Y9	2-6-0	Beyer, Peacock & Co	3533	1893	12 January 1931	Scrapped 1937
Y10	2-6-0	Beyer, Peacock & Co	3534	1893	12 January 1931	Scrapped 1937
Y11	2-6-0	Beyer, Peacock & Co	3535	1893	16 May 1960	Stored at Railway Town, donated to Penrose Park Trust, Silverton September 1965
Y12	2-6-0	Beyer, Peacock & Co	3536	1893	17 July 1961	Withdrawn 1961, steamed in 1964 for Broken Hill Club picnic special, stored Railway Town, donated to the Mile End Railway Museum in 1965; subsequently on display at the National Railway Museum, Port Adelaide.
Y13	2-6-0	Beyer, Peacock & Co	3796	1895	28 May 1953	Fitted with MSL superheater
Y14	2-6-0	Beyer, Peacock & Co	3870	1896	14 December 1955	Scrapped July 1963
Y15	2-6-0	Beyer, Peacock & Co	3871	1896	17 May 1961	Fitted with MSL superheater
Y16	2-6-0	Beyer, Peacock & Co	5006	1907	28 February 1953	Fitted with MSL superheater
Y17	2-6-0	Beyer, Peacock & Co	5007	1907	30 January 1959	Scrapped 1961

== Preservation ==
- Y1: at Sulphide Street Museum
- Y6: at Mount Laura Homestead Museum
- Y11: at Penrose Park, Silverton in September 1965
- Y12: at the National Railway Museum, Port Adelaide
