= Tarrawingee Tramway =

Former railway in New South Wales, Australia

Overview
- Termini: Sulphide Street; Tarrawingee
- Continues from: Silverton Tramway

Service
- Operator(s): Silverton Tramway Company

History
- Opened: 9 June 1891
- Closed: 17 April 1931

Technical
- Line length: 64.37 km (40.00 mi)
- Track gauge: 1,067 mm (3 ft 6 in)

The Tarrawingee Tramway was a railway in the Barrier Ranges region of New South Wales.

== History ==
On 9 June 1891, the Tarrawingee Flux & Tramway Company, led by J. S. Reid, opened a 40 mile line to carry high-grade limestone from Tarrawingee (for use as flux) to the Broken Hill smelters. It purchased two James Martin & Co built 2-6-0 locomotives to the same specification as the South Australian Railways Y class. However they were sold to railway builder Baxter & Sadler and the Silverton Tramway Company (STC) and instead hired in locomotives from the STC.

In 1897, the smelting of iron-ore had moved to Port Pirie and the need for Tarrawingee limestone ceased. After being lobbied, on 7 September 1899 the New South Wales Government Railways (NSWGR) purchased the line for £15,000 and spend £37,000 upgrading the line. As it was isolated from the rest of the NSWGR's operations and to a different gauge, it contracted STC to operate services. In 1900, a 1 mile 8 chain branch was added to McCulloch Park Racecourse.

On 31 December 1929 the line closed, the service by this stage down to one per week. It briefly reopened in 1931 to allow 25,000 tons of aggregate to be conveyed from Tarrawingee for construction of the Broken Hill Central Power Station with the last train running on 17 April 1931. In May 1936, the line was sold to Zinc Corporation for dismantling except for short spur to the Vacuum Oil Company, this was removed in March 1959.
