= Cockburn railway station =

Former railway station in South Australia, Australia

Cockburn

General information
- Coordinates: 32°04′39″S 140°59′53″E
- Owner: Silverton Tramway Company
- Operator: Silverton Tramway Company
- Lines: Silverton Tramway; Port Augusta-Cockburn
- Distance: 58 kilometres from Sulphide Street; 483 kilometres from Adelaide
- Platforms: 1

Construction
- Structure type: Ground

Other information
- Status: Closed

History
- Opened: 11 June 1887
- Closed: 9 January 1970
Location

Cockburn railway station was located on the Silverton Tramway serving the town of Cockburn on the New South Wales / South Australian state border.

== History ==
Cockburn station opened on 11 June 1887 when the Silverton Tramway opened from Broken Hill. It was the junction station between the Silverton Tramway and South Australian Railways. Both lines were laid to the same 1,067 mm (3 ft 6 in) gauge, allowing trains to cross between the networks, however locomotives were changed at Cockburn.

The station was initially served by one daily train in each direction. By 1908, this had increased to 30 in each direction. The station closed on 9 January 1970 when the Silverton Tramway was replaced by a new standard gauge line.
