= Stephens Creek (New South Wales) =

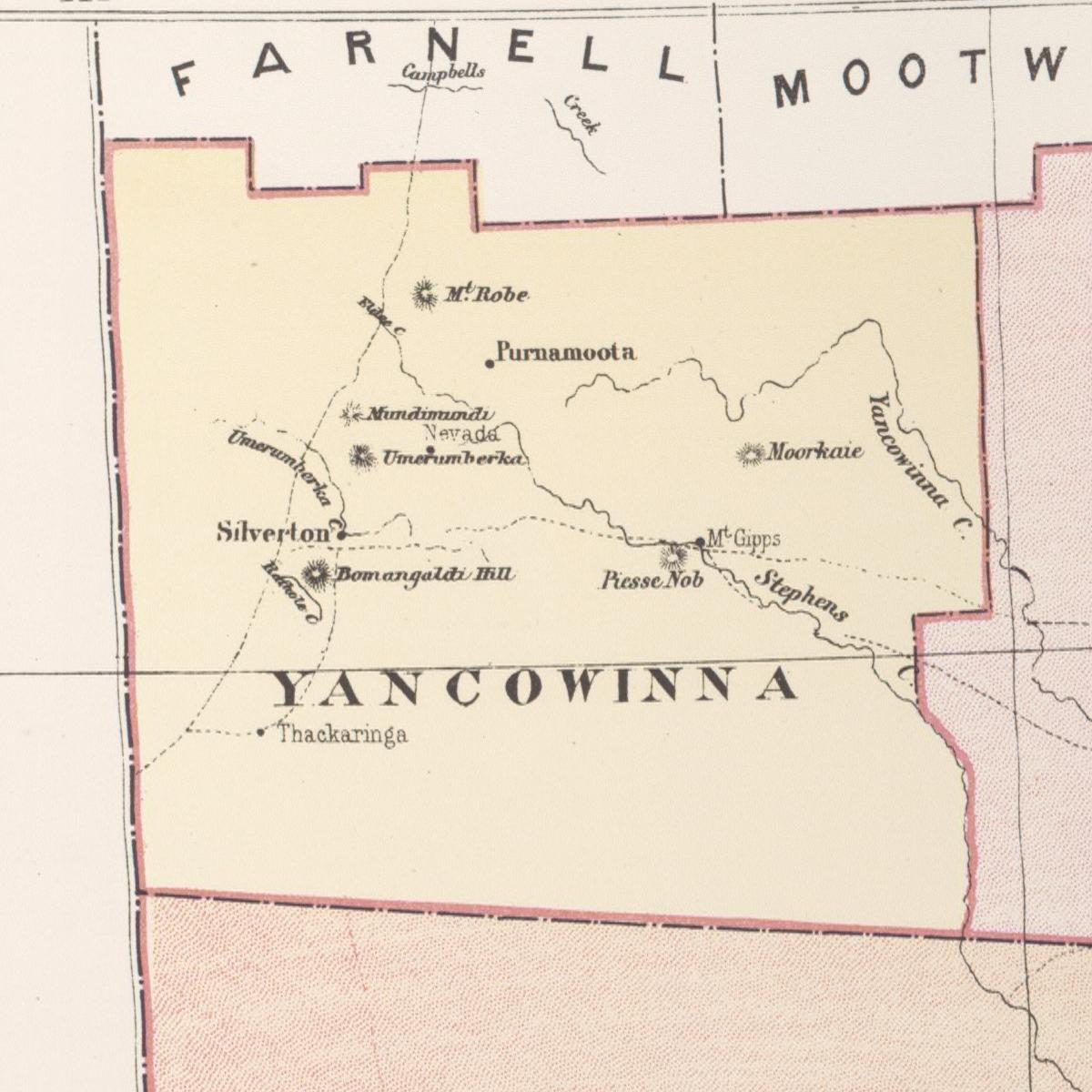
Stephens Creek, shown in a map from 1886

Stephens Creek is an ephemeral water course in far western New South Wales, Australia. The creek flows around Broken Hill and Silverton, New South Wales, and Stephens Creek Dam, a reservoir on the creek, is Broken Hill's main water supply.
