= Sulphide Street railway station =

Former railway station in New South Wales, Australia

Sulphide Street
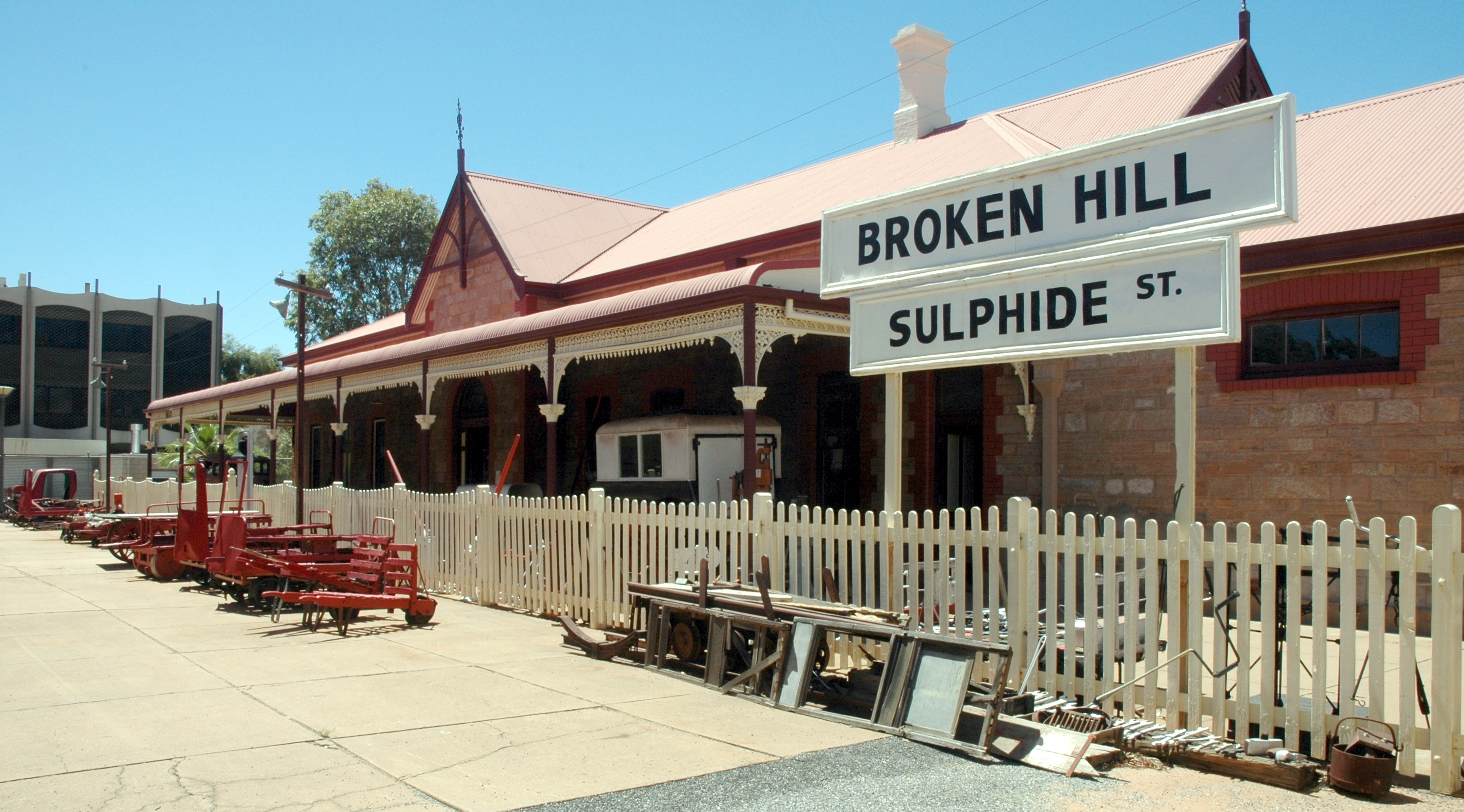
- The station building, by then a museum, in 2007

General information
- Location: Blende Street, Broken Hill
- Coordinates: 31°57′33″S 141°27′40″E
- Owner: Silverton Tramway Company (1889–1970)
- Lines: Silverton Tramway; Tarrawingee Tramway

Construction
- Structure type: Ground

Other information
- Status: Re-purposed to museum

History
- Opened: 2 January 1889
- Closed: 9 January 1970
- Rebuilt: 1905
Location

Sulphide Street railway station, in the city of Broken Hill, New South Wales, Australia, was the eastern terminus of the Silverton Tramway. The "tramway" was a narrow-gauge railway built by the private Silverton Tramway Company to circumvent a political stand-off: the New South Wales Government refused to allow the South Australian Government to extend 58 kilometres (36 miles) into the state beyond the 351 kilometres (218 miles) line that took ore concentrates from the state border to smelters at Port Pirie.

== History ==
Sulphide Street station opened, with a timber station building, on 2 January 1889. In 1905, the present stone-and-brick building was built. From 1891 until 1929 Sulphide Street was also served by the Tarrawingee Tramway. The station closed on 9 January 1970 when the Silverton Tramway was replaced by a new standard-gauge line to South Australia via Broken Hill station.

The station reopened in the late 1970s as a museum. Among the exhibits are company locomotives Y1 and W24, South Australian Railways T181, and a New South Wales Government Railways Silver City Comet multiple-unit railcar. The station appears in the cult 1971 film, Wake in Fright.
