= Tarrawingee, New South Wales =

Locality and ghost town in New South Wales, Australia

Coordinates: 31.455°S 141.482°E

Tarrawingee is a locality and a ghost town in the Far West region of New South Wales, some 60 kilometres (37 mi) north of the town of Broken Hill. The town was established in 1889 to exploit a deposit of limestone needed as flux for the smelters at Broken Hill. The township grew to accommodate 400 people and facilities included a post office, two pubs, a police station, a court house and a school. In 1898, smelting moved to Port Pirie and the limestone quarry closed. Today only the stone foundations of a few buildings remain.

Between 1890 and 1930, Tarrawingee was the terminus of the Tarrawingee Tramway. Used at first to cart limestone back to Broken Hill, it was later used as a stepping off point for coaches heading to places such as Tibooburra and Milparinka. The line closed permanently in 1932 and the lines were removed in 1936.

The town had a Hotel, Police Station and a school. A tram line was constructed to the town operated from 1890 to 1936. Tarrawingee is located on Campbells Creek near is headwaters.

== See also ==
- Tarrawingee, Victoria
