= Southern & Silverton Rail =

Former Australian railway company

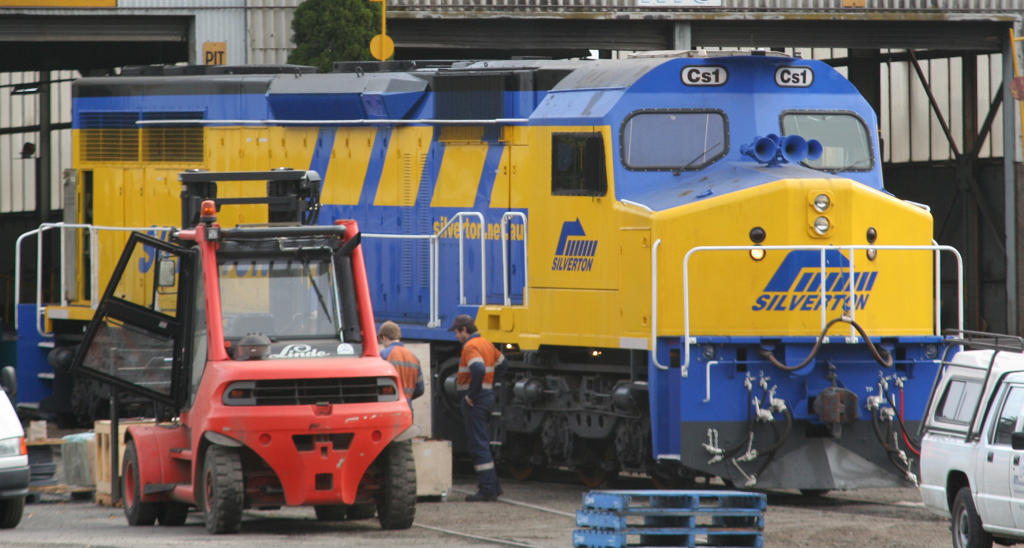
- Diesel-electric locomotive Cs1 in the Silverton Rail livery introduced in 1998
- Industry: Railway operator
- Founded: 1886
- Defunct: 2010
- Headquarters: Broken Hill
- Parent: Qube Logistics
- Website: www.silverton.net.au

Southern & Silverton Rail was an Australian rail operator founded in 1886 as the Silverton Tramway Company. The company operated the 1067 mm (3 ft 6 in) Silverton Tramway, conveying silver-lead-zinc concentrates 58 kilometres (36 miles) from Broken Hill to the South Australian border. In 1970, its main line was bypassed by the newly standardised, government-funded line from Broken Hill to Port Pirie. It then diversified to operating hook-and-pull services and in the mid-1990s rebranded to Silverton Rail. In 2006, it was purchased by South Spur Rail Services and rebranded again as Southern & Silverton Rail, before both entities were sold to Coote Industrial. In June 2010 it was sold to Qube Logistics and absorbed into that brand.

== Inauguration ==
The Silverton Tramway Company was incorporated in New South Wales in 1886 by a consortium led by newspaper owner, editor and "mover and shaker" businessman James Smith Reid (Note: The other members were William MacGregor; Kenric Brodribb, grazier of Poolamacca Station; William Robert Wilson, General Manager of the Barrier Ranges Silver Mining Associated Limited; and John Penrose, a Silverton brewer and soft drink manufacturer. All except Penrose were also involved with floating the Broken Hill Proprietary Company.) after the Government of New South Wales enacted the Silverton Tramway Act 1886. The Act granted to the backers (Note: It is noteworthy that the Act did not grant the powers to a body corporate but to specific persons: Kenric Brodribb of Poolamacca, grazier; Charles Chapple of Silverton, broker; William Robert Wilson of Silverton, General Manager of the Barrier Ranges Silver Mining Associated Limited ("gentleman"); Murdoch MacLeod of Melbourne, financial agent; Henry Byron Moore of Melbourne, surveyor; and Charles Godde Lush of Melbourne, merchant.) the rights to build and operate the Silverton Tramway, a 58-kilometre (36-mile)-long 1067 mm (3 ft 6 in) narrow-gauge railway to run from the New South Wales–South Australia state border to Broken Hill. Headquartered in Melbourne from 1894, the company was listed on the London Stock Exchange in 1897, later transferring to the Australian Stock Exchange.

The line opened on 12 January 1888 with its eastern terminus in Broken Hill and the western terminus at Burns railway station, immediately adjacent to the state border.

By the end of 1888, the company had concluded a deal for the South Australian Railways to operate main line services while the company serviced the various mines and sidings in Broken Hill; the arrangement ceased in 1893.

In August 1899, the New South Wales Government Railways (NSWGR) purchased the Tarrawingee Tramway. Since it was isolated and to a different gauge from the rest of its operations, the NSWGR contracted Silverton to operate services until the line closed in 1931.

== Redundancy ==
Following a new 1435 mm (4 ft 8 1/2 in) standard gauge line being opened in February 1970 by the Australian federal government, the line was made redundant and the company concentrated on operating shunting and track maintenance services to the mines industry in and around Broken Hill with its remaining two diesel locomotives. Under the 1886 Act, the Government of New South Wales had an option to buy out the company for 21 times the annual divisible profits of the preceding seven years. Silverton calculated it was entitled to $5.8 million, but through legislation this was removed, the company having to settle for a $2 million payment.

In 1969, the Dillingham Corporation of Honolulu bought a 33% shareholding, later increasing to 50%. In 1972, it was then taken over by T & G Mutual Life Assurance Society and delisted. It was included in the 1983 purchase of T & G Mutual by National Mutual, and in 1986 was sold in a management buyout to Graham Clements.

Having purchased a number of locomotives from FreightCorp and AN Tasrail, in 1995/96 Silverton Rail leased six locomotives to National Rail for use on Adelaide to Melbourne services as bankers to Tailem Bend. With the introduction of an open access regime in New South Wales the business was rebranded as Silverton Rail, and in August 1999 began operating iron ore services from Cobar to Narromine as a subcontractor to National Rail and relocated the majority of its fleet to Parkes Roundhouse. In August 1999, it also began operating trip workings in Sydney. In August 2000, Silverton began operating grain services from Nyngan to Sydney.

During the early 2000s, a new depot was established in Newcastle at the Broadmeadow Yard rail facilities. This small crew provided train crewing and logistics for the Southland (Pelton) Coal Mine near Cessnock to Pacific National until its 2003 closure due to underground fires. Other services from the Broadmeadow Depot included the daily containerised freight service from Tolls Carrington to Port Botany and return, as well as crewing both ends of the Wee Waa to Port Botany export cotton trains. Crewing services were also provided to Interail and Pacific National Rural & Bulk, Pacific National Coal and Railcorp for AK track recording cars and maintenance and emergency recovery trains.

== Corporate dispersal ==
In February 2006, Silverton Rail was sold to Western Australian-based South Spur Rail Services. The locomotives and rolling stock were sold to the Allco Finance Group and leased back. Silverton Rail was rebranded as Southern & Silverton Railway. In March 2007, South Spur Rail Services was purchased by Coote Industrial. Following Allco Finance running into financial trouble, Coote Industrial was able to buy much of the former Silverton rolling stock in January 2008 through its controlled subsidiary Greentrains. In June 2010 South Spur Rail Services was sold to P&O Trans Australia.

In April 2011, Qube Logistics acquired outright control and majority ownership of P&O Trans Australia and Southern & Silverton Rail was rebranded. Qube Logistics purchased New South Wales freight operator Independent Transport Group in June 2012.

== Locomotives ==
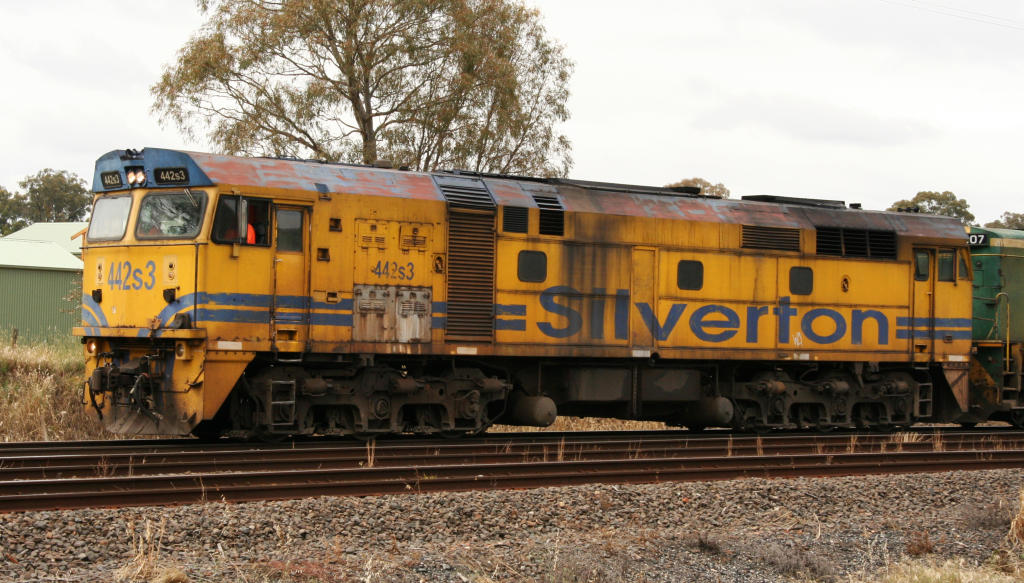
442s3 in the Silverton Rail livery introduced in May 1984

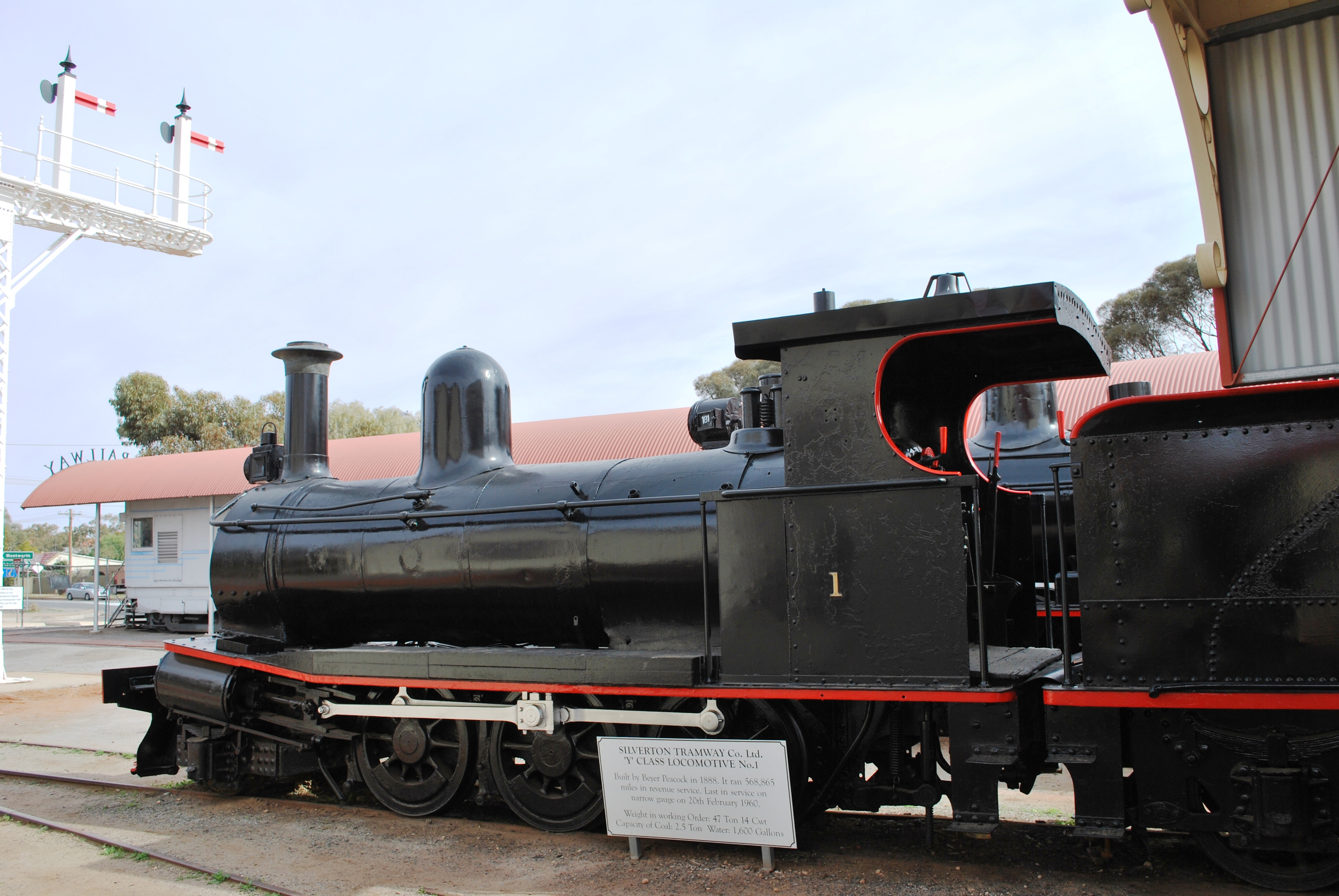
Preserved Y1 at Sulphide Street Museum, Broken Hill in August 2009

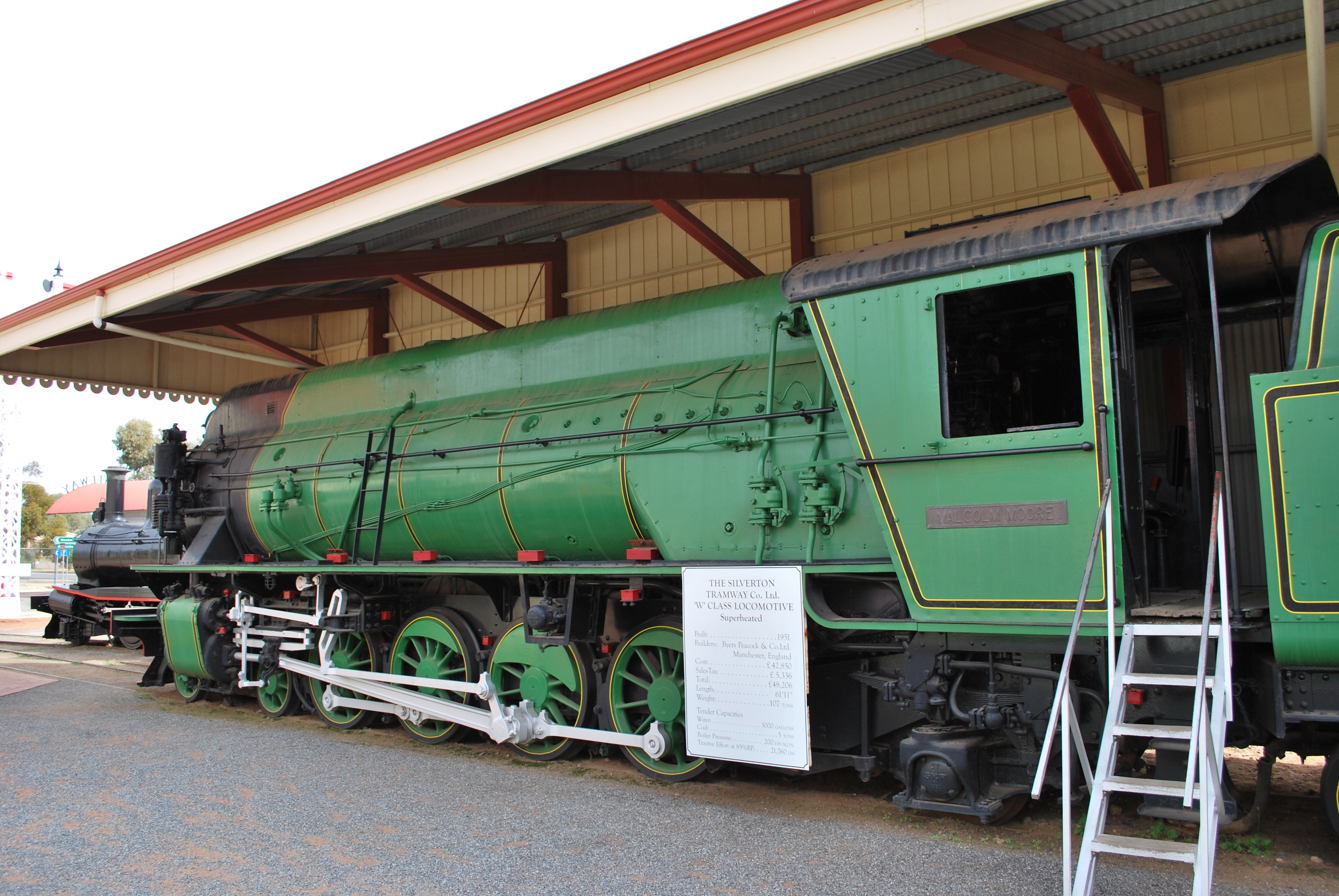
Preserved W24 at Sulphide Street Museum, Broken Hill in August 2009

When the Silverton Tramway Company commenced operations in 1888, it hired South Australian Railways Y class locomotives, before purchasing steam locomotives of the Y, A and W classes. In 1958 it purchased a second-hand Andrew Barclay Sons & Co. diesel shunter, and in 1960/61 three Alco DL531s.

In 1990, two ex Australian National 830 class were purchased from AN Tasrail followed in December 1994 by six 48 class and 442 class locomotives from FreightCorp. Also purchased for parts were two 830s and three 48s.

In June 2002 a 45 class locomotive was purchased from Great Northern Rail Services and returned to service as 45s1. A former Genesee & Wyoming Australia 930 class had entered service with Silverton by August 2002 as 44s1 while two former FreightCorp 44 class entered service as 44s2 and 44s3.

In March 2003, twenty-four 80 class locomotives were purchased from FreightCorp with four returned to traffic. Around the same time nine C class locomotives were purchased from National Rail with seven placed in service and two sublet to Pacific National. Other acquisitions were eight 85 and forty 86 class electric locomotives from FreightCorp. All were scrapped without use.
