= South Australian Railways Y class =

South Australian Railways narrow-gauge steam locomotive

South Australian Railways Y / Yx class
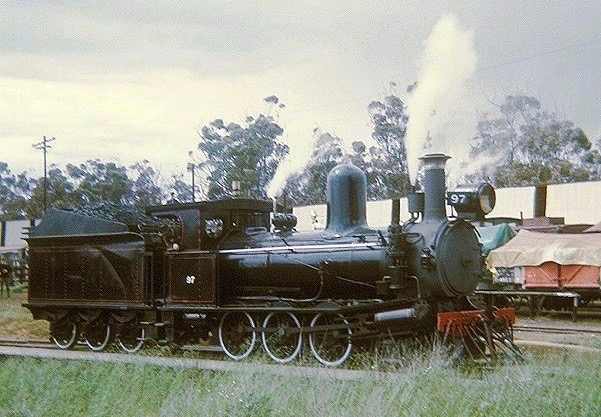
- Y97 on the turntable at Jamestown during a railway enthusiast trip in October 1967
Type and origin
- Power type: Steam
- Builder: Beyer, Peacock & Co. (50); Islington Railway Workshops (2); James Martin & Co (77)
- Build date: 1885–1898
- Total produced: 129
Specifications
- Configuration
  - Whyte: 2-6-0
- Gauge: 1067 mm (3 ft 6 in)
- Length: 39 ft 3 in (11,963 mm)
- Height: 11 ft 6 1/4 in (3512 mm)
- Total weight: 47 long tons 15 cwt (107,000 lb; 48.5 t); 47 long tons 15 cwt (53.5 short tons)
- Fuel type: Coal
- Fuel capacity: 4 long tons 10 cwt (10,100 lb; 4.6 t); 4 long tons 10 cwt (5.0 short tons)
- Water cap.: 1600 imperial gallons (7300 litres; 1900 US gallons)
- Boiler pressure: 145 lbf/in^{2} (1.00 MPa)
- Cylinders: 2 outside
- Cylinder size: 14.5 in × 20 in (368 mm × 508 mm)
Performance figures
- Tractive effort: 13,289 lbf (59.11 kN)
Career
- Operators: South Australian Railways and others
- Class: Y and Yx
- Numbers: Y22, Y38, Y43, Y49, Y57-Y106, Y1108-Y142, Y147-Y179, Y195
- Preserved: Y12, Y71, Y82, Yx86, Y97, Y109, Yx135, Yx141, Yx176
- Disposition: 9 preserved, 121 scrapped

The South Australian Railways Y class was a class of narrow gauge steam locomotives operated by the South Australian Railways.

== History ==
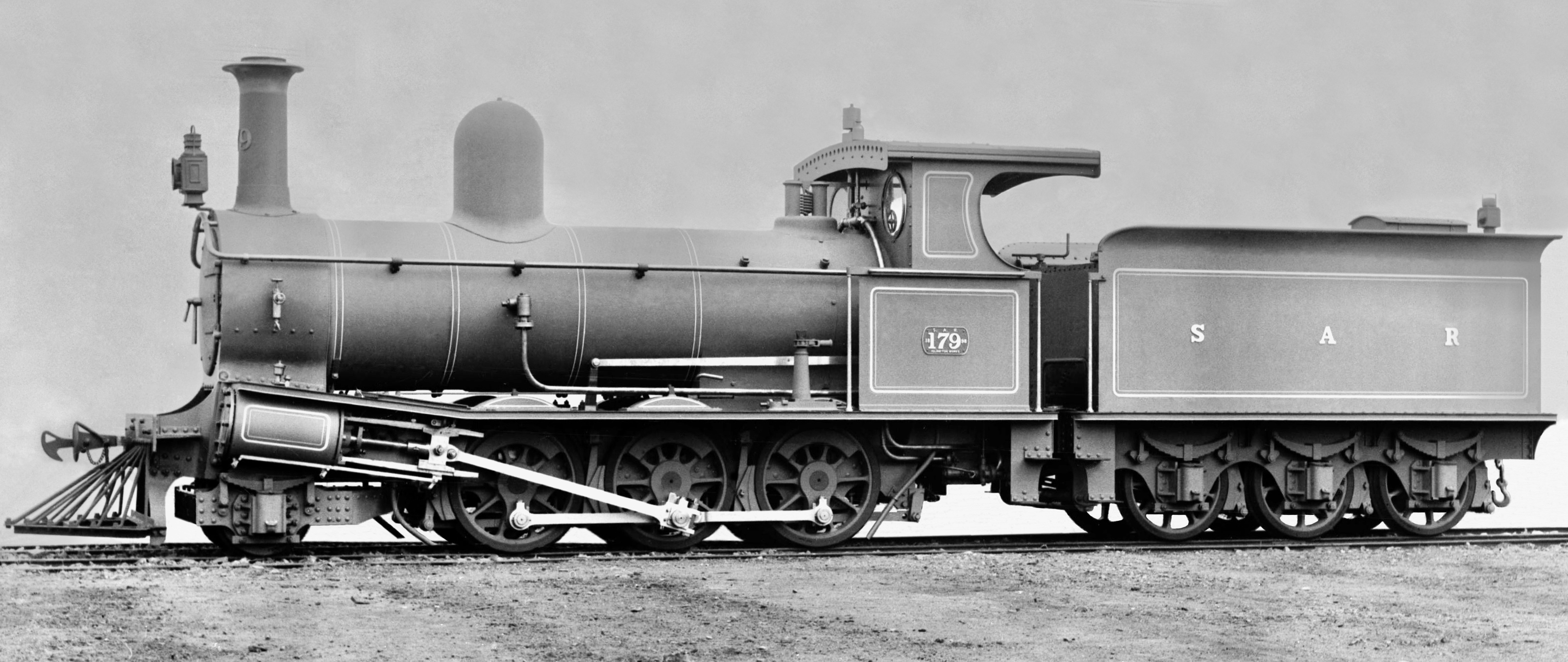
Islington Works builder's photo of Y class no. 179, outshopped in 1898

The Y class were numerically the largest class of steam locomotive operated by the South Australian Railways (SAR). With a Mogul (2-6-0) wheel arrangement widely used in Australia at the time, 129 were built between 1885 and 1898. Beyer, Peacock & Co, Manchester built 50, James Martin & Co of Gawler 77, and the SAR's Islington Railway Workshops 2. They operated across the SAR's narrow gauge network. Between 1904 and 1924, 48 were fitted with new Belpaire boilers and reclassified as the Yx class.

They were part of what became almost an Australian 1067 mm (3 ft 6 in) standard, as locomotives of similar design served in large numbers as the Silverton Tramway Y class, Tasmanian Government Railways C class and Western Australian Government Railways G class, and also in Queensland and on the Emu Bay Railway and North Australia Railway.

Some were sold for further service to railway construction companies while others saw further service on the timber railway lines of Western Australia. During World War II, 18 were sold to the Commonwealth Railways for use on the North Australia Railway as the Nfb class. Seven of these were sold in 1948 to the Tasmanian Government Railways, but only four entered service (as F1–F4).

== Preserved locomotives ==
As of 2022, there were 10 preserved Y and Yx class locomotives (of which Yx141 was operational), as follows:

Number	System	Owner or custodian	Location (as of 2022)
Y1	Silverton Tramway Company	Sulphide Street Railway and Historical Museum	Broken Hill, NSW
Y12	Silverton Tramway Company	National Railway Museum	Port Adelaide, SA
Y71	SAR then West Australian Jarrah Forest Co.	South-West Rail & Heritage Centre	Boyanup, WA
Y82	SAR	District Council of Peterborough	Peterborough, SA
Yx86	SAR then Victorian Construction Co. then Bunnings Bros	The Railway Museum	Bassendean, WA
Y97	SAR	National Railway Museum	Port Adelaide, SA
Y109	SAR then a Western Australian timber company	Manjimup Heritage Park	Manjimup, WA
Yx135 / NFB88	SAR then Commonwealth Railways (on North Australia Railway as NFB88)	Old Katherine Railway Station (National Trust)	Katherine, NT
Yx141	SAR	Pichi Richi Railway	Quorn, SA
Yx176	SAR then Bunning Bros	Yarloop Workshops	Yarloop, WA
