= Goolwa railway station =

Railway station in South Australia, Australia

Goolwa
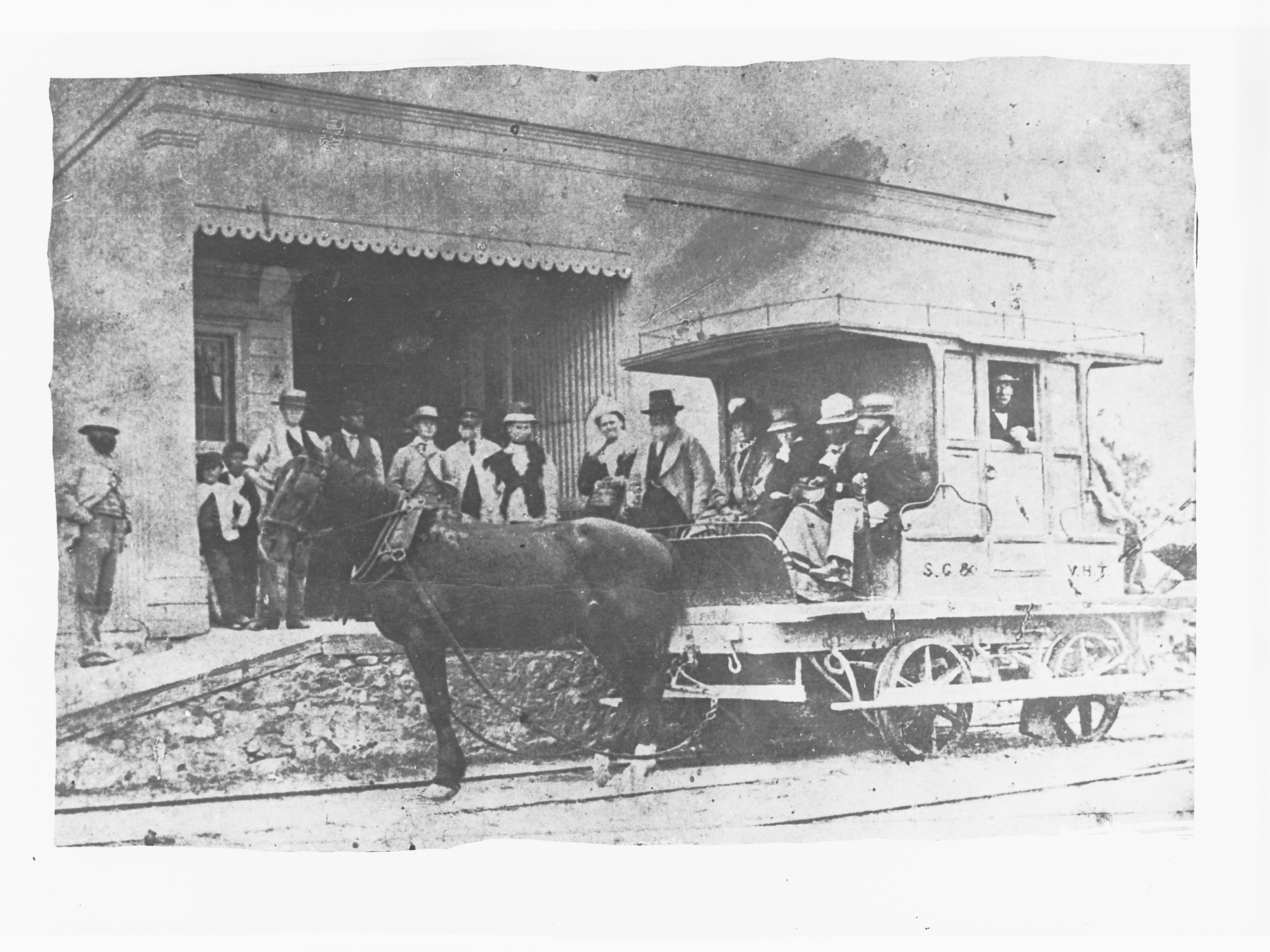
- The Pie Cart, Goolwa Railway Station (circa 1864)

General information
- Location: Dunbar Road, Goolwa, South Australia
- Coordinates: 35.504604716895955°S 138.78524496558651°E
- Operator: Steamranger
- Line: Victor Harbor line
- Distance: 83.8 kilometres from Adelaide
- Platforms: 1
- Tracks: 1

Construction
- Structure type: Ground

History
- Opened: 1854
- Closed: 1984
Location

Goolwa railway station is a preserved railway station located in the river port of Goolwa, on the broad gauge Victor Harbor line, formerly operated by South Australian Railways and its successor, Australian National.

== History ==
Goolwa railway station opened in 1854 as a one terminus of a line linking the River Murray to the sea at Port Elliot. That railway was soon extended from Port Elliot to Victor Harbor and from Goolwa to Strathalbyn in 1869 and the connection from Adelaide reached that town in 1884 completing the full line.

The station was built on the Wharf precinct, alongside the River Murray. The original section of track from Goolwa to Port Elliot was Australia's the first public railway.

Regular Australian National passenger services ended in 1984 and the station was leased out to community groups for social and community gatherings.

== Present-day use ==
In 1989, a not-for-profit railway preservation organisation, SteamRanger, was established by the Australian Railway Historical Society to operate its heritage train tours from Adelaide to Victor Harbor through the station.

Six years later, as part of the One Nation infrastructure program, the main line between Adelaide and Melbourne was converted to standard gauge, leaving Steamranger's depot at Dry Creek in metropolitan Adelaide isolated.

In a major project, all of SteamRanger's locomotives, rolling stock and infrastructure were moved to Mount Barker station and volunteers took full responsibility for maintaining the track from Mount Barker Junction to Victor Harbor.
