= Port Elliot railway station =

Railway station in South Australia, Australia

Port Elliot

General information
- Location: Henry Street, Port Elliot, South Australia
- Coordinates: 35°31′58″S 138°40′50″E
- Operator: Steamranger
- Line: Victor Harbor line
- Distance: 82.7 kilometres from Adelaide
- Platforms: 1
- Tracks: 1

Construction
- Structure type: Ground

History
- Opened: 1866
- Closed: 1984

Services
Preceding station	South Australian Railways	Following station
Middleton towards Adelaide	Victor Harbor railway line	Victor Harbor Terminus
Location

Port Elliot railway station is a preserved railway station located in the river port of Port Elliot, on the broad gauge Victor Harbor line, formerly operated by South Australian Railways and its successor, Australian National.

== History ==
Port Elliot railway station opened in 1854 when the 11 kilometres (6.8 miles) line from Goolwa, on the River Murray, to the small ocean harbour at Port Elliot was completed. It was soon extended south to Victor Harbor and north to Strathalbyn by 1869.

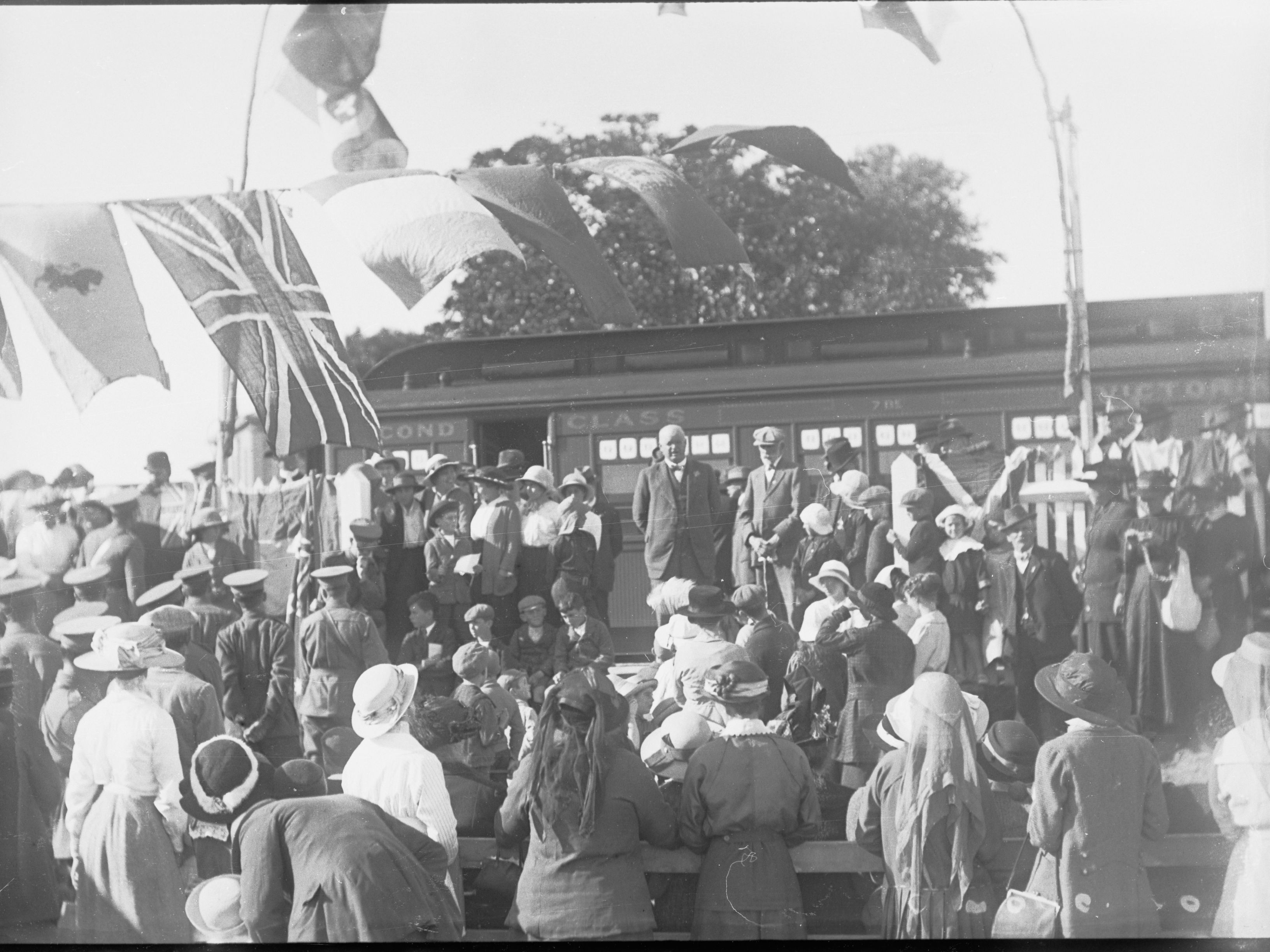
Mr Noel Webb speaking to a crowd at Port Elliot railway station. He is standing in front of a WWI recruitment train (c1916)

The first station at Port Elliot was a small wooden sentry box-type structure which opened in 1866 but was destroyed in a storm. A new stone building was built in 1865 but it had to be replaced after the tracks were realigned. A jolt iron structure was built later in the 1870s but the current station replaced it in 1911.

Regular Australian National passenger services ceased in 1984, largely due to the devious rail route from Adelaide to Victor Harbor and a rise in car ownership.

=== Present day ===
In 1989, a not-for-profit railway preservation organisation, SteamRanger, was established by the Australian Railway Historical Society to operate its heritage train tours from Adelaide to Victor Harbor through the station. Six years later, as part of the One Nation infrastructure program, the main line between Adelaide and Melbourne was converted to standard gauge, leaving Steamranger's depot at Dry Creek in metropolitan Adelaide isolated. In a major project, all of SteamRanger's locomotives, rolling stock and infrastructure were moved to Mount Barker station.

The station is now a museum which houses a National Trust Historical Display and a National Trust Historic Railway and Seaport Centre.
