= SteamRanger Heritage Railway =

Preserved railway line in South Australia

SteamRanger

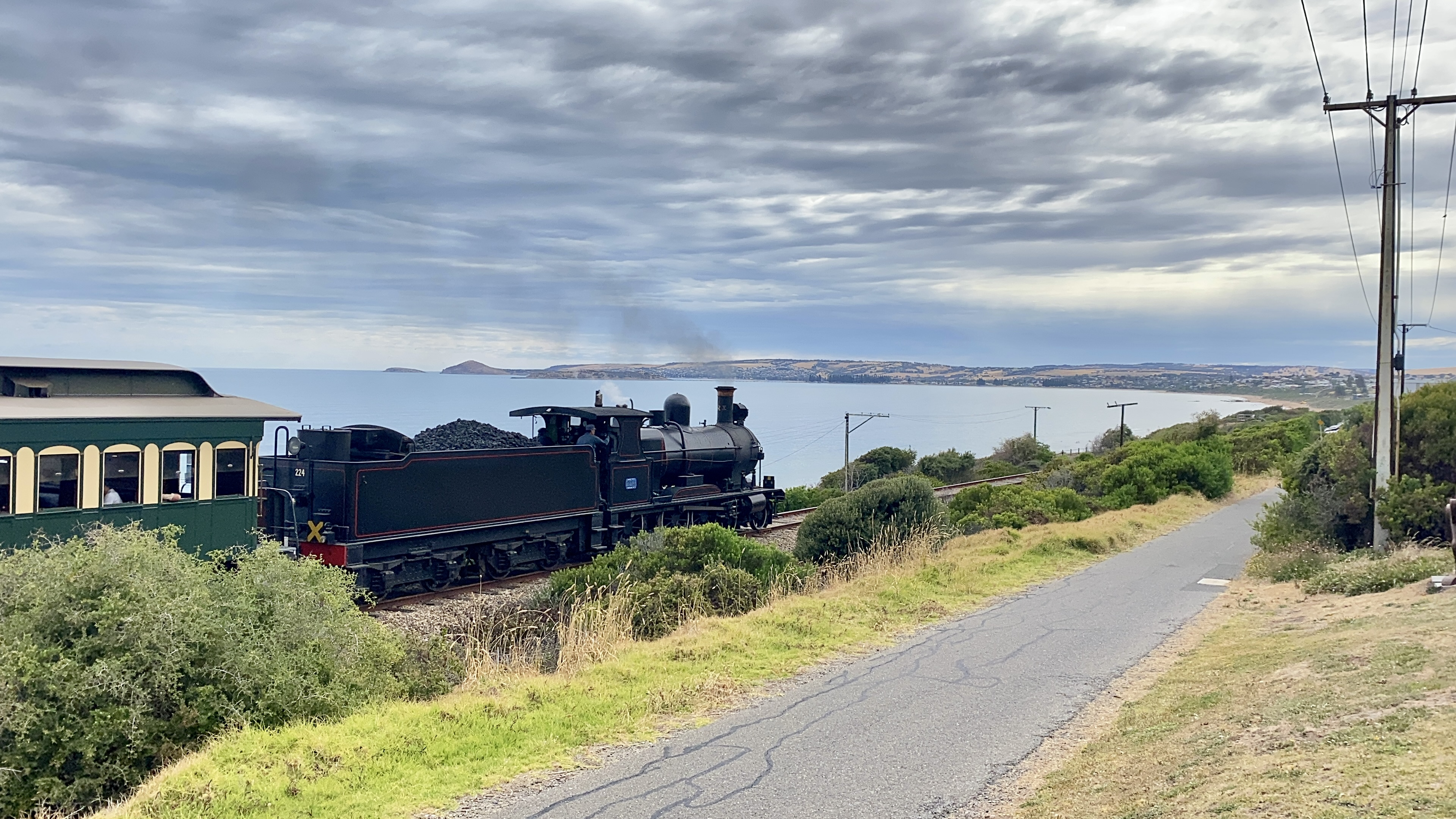
- Rx 224 leaving Port Elliot in January 2022
- Established: 1986
- Location: Mount Barker South Australia
- Coordinates: 35°03′58″S 138°51′56″E
- Type: Heritage Railway
- Website: www.steamrangerheritagerailway.org

The SteamRanger Heritage Railway is an 82 kilometres (51 miles) long 1600 mm (5 ft 3 in) broad gauge tourist railway, formerly the Victor Harbor railway line of the South Australian Railways (SAR). It is operated by the not-for-profit South Australian Division of the Australian Railway Historical Society. As the last operating non-suburban line of the former broad-gauge network, on which Australia's first public railway was opened, the line and its associated rail assets have high historical significance.

== History ==
In the 1970s, the South Australian Division of the Australian Railway Historical Society established SteamRanger as a not-for-profit railway preservation offshoot to operate its train tours from Adelaide, mainly on rural lines throughout the state's broad-gauge networks. SteamRanger opened their first purpose-built depot at Dry Creek railway station, 11 kilometres (6.8 miles) north of Adelaide in 1980. From the mid-1980s, SteamRanger gradually took over the operation and maintenance of the Victor Harbor railway line in the Adelaide Hills.

When plans were announced for the Adelaide to Melbourne line to be converted to 1435 mm (4 ft 8 1/2 in) standard gauge, SteamRanger had to choose between staying at Dry Creek and losing its investment in the Victor Harbor line, or move and become isolated from Adelaide's suburban railway lines. Since the first choice would break the society's financial viability, in a huge project all of SteamRanger's locomotives and rolling stock were moved.

Entrance to SteamRanger's main locomotive and rolling stock depot, at Mount Barker, in 2026. 350 and 500 class shunting locomotives are on the fan.

A new depot was built at Mount Barker railway station, at the northern end of the broad-gauge line to Victor Harbor. As part of the move, the District Council of Mount Barker renovated the station building, derelict at the time, to become SteamRanger's headquarters. Conversion of the interstate line was completed in 1995 as part of the One Nation infrastructure upgrade program. Following that most of South Australia's broad-gauge tracks have been closed, the line has become the last operating memory of locomotive-hauled trains on the broad gauge.

== Services ==
As of January 2023, scheduled SteamRanger trips were as follows.

| Name | Between (round trips) | Distance and time (round trips) | Days | Steam or diesel? | Notes |
|---|---|---|---|---|---|
| Cockle Train – off peak (Note: Cockle Train page) | Goolwa and Victor Harbor | 21 km (13 mi). About 1 hour, 30 minutes. | Most Wednesdays and weekends | Heritage diesel locomotives or railcars* | Buy tickets on day of travel at SteamRanger stations (does not have reserved seats) |
| Cockle Train – during school holidays (Note: Cockle Train page) | As above | As above | Every day during school holidays | Normally steam locomotives; diesel when a total fire ban for the Mount Lofty Ranges is in force* | As above |
| Southern Encounter (Note: Southern Encounter page) | Mount Barker to Victor Harbor | 164 km (102 mi). About 8 hours 45 minutes including 2 hours 40 minutes lunch and several 10-minute stops. | First, third and fifth Sundays May to November | Normally steam locomotives; diesel when a total fire ban for the Mount Lofty Ranges is in force* | Bookings essential** |
| Hills Encounter (Note: Hills Encounter page) | Victor Harbor to Mount Barker | 164 km (102 mi). About 8 hours including 2 hours 20 minutes lunch. | As on website | Normally steam locomotives; diesel when a total fire ban for the Mount Lofty Ranges is in force* | Passengers can optionally leave train at Strathalbyn for lunch and shopping then join return trip. Bookings essential. |
| StrathLink (Note: StrathLink page) | Victor Harbor (or board at Goolwa) to Strathalbyn | 100 km (62 mi). About 5 hours 20 minutes including 2 hours lunch. | Several days during the school holidays | On the Cockle Train Victor Harbor to Goolwa, then via heritage railcar to Strathalbyn | Booking advisable since some trains fill quickly |
| Bugle Ranger (Note: Bugle Ranger page) | Mount Barker to Philcox Hill and Bugle Ranges station | 18 km (11 mi). About 45 minutes. | Fourth Sunday June to November | Red Hen railcar | Buy tickets on day of travel at SteamRanger's Mount Barker station |
* When the forecast for Victor Harbor is 35 degrees Celsius or above, the Cockle Train does not operate. ** First-class tickets include compartment in an art deco carriage with morning tea, lunch and a paddle steamer voyage.

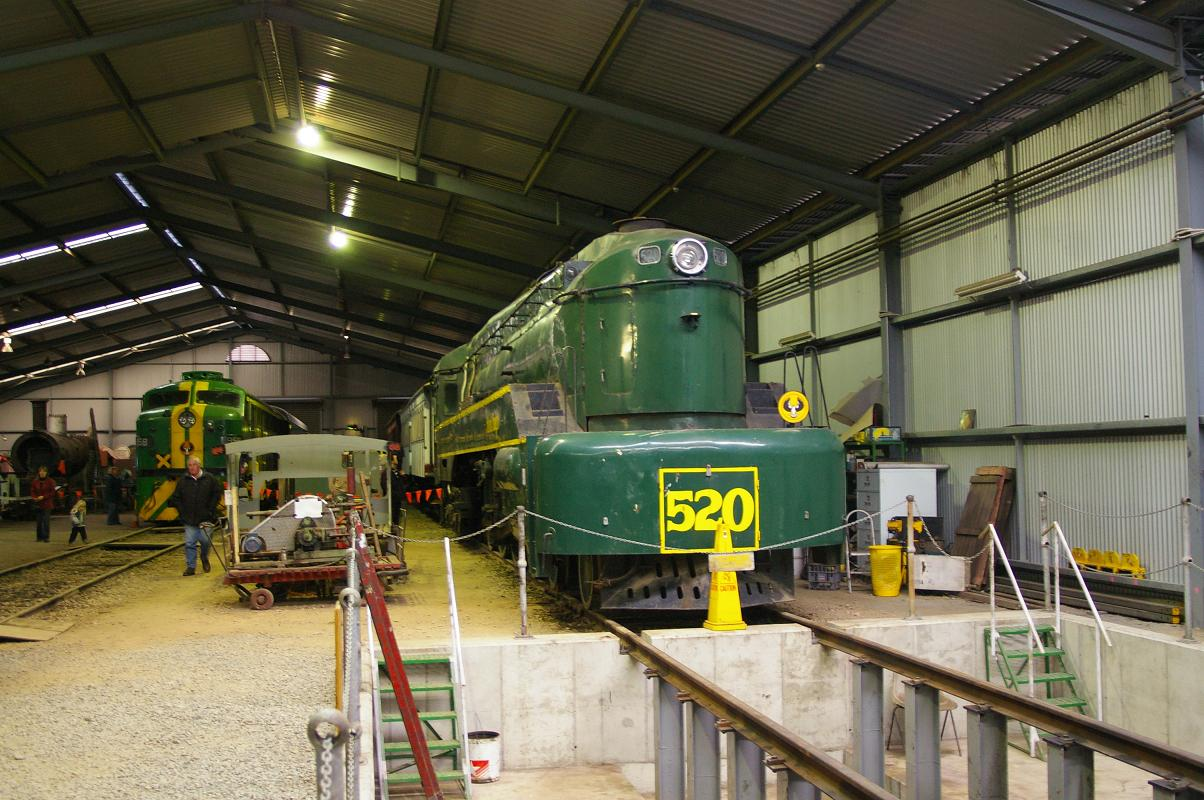
Mainline diesel-electric locomotive 958 and steam locomotive 520 at SteamRanger's Mount Barker workshop in 2006

== Fleet ==
SteamRanger's fleet as of September 2026 was as follows.

| Locomotive | Class | Built | Status | Gauge | Notes | Photo |
|---|---|---|---|---|---|---|
Steam locomotives
| Rx207 Dean Harvey | SAR Rx class | 1913 | Operational | BG | Out for repair as of September 2026 | Rx207 with a rollng stock transfer |
| Rx224 | SAR Rx class | 1915 | Operational | BG | Re-entered service in 2021 after 30 years out of traffic | Rx224 and 621 |
| F251 | SAR F class | 1922 | Stored awaiting overhaul | BG | | F251 in Mt Barker depot |
| 621 Duke of Edinburgh | SAR 620 class | 1936 | Operational | BG | 90th birthday celebrations held on 6 September 2026 | 621 and train |
| 520 Sir Malcolm Barclay-Harvey | SAR 520 class | 1943 | Under long-term restoration | BG | As of September 2026, boiler was back on locomotive | 520 at Mt Gambier, 1984 |
Diesel-electric locomotives
| 350 | SAR 350 class | 1949 | Operational | BG | Yard shunter at Mt Barker | 350 at Mt Barker |
| 507 | SAR 500 class | 1965 | Operational | BG | Purchased from AN in 1991, used when 844 or 845 are unavailable | 507 at Goolwa |
| 527 | SAR 500 class | 1969 | Stored | BG | Donated in 2026 by Aurizon | 527 at Mt Barker |
| 704 | SAR 700 class | 1972 | Under restoration | BG | Donated in 2022 by ORA | 704 in the Mt Barker depot |
| 844 | SAR 830 class | 1962 | Operational | BG | Donated in 2020 by ORA | 844 at Mt Barker depot |
| 845 | SAR 830 class | 1963 | Operational | BG | Donated in 2017 by Pacific National | 845 at Middleton |
| 958 | SAR 930 class | 1965 | Operational | BG | Purchased in 1992 from Australian National Railways Commission (AN) | 958 on the Sunsetter |
| 963 | SAR 930 class | 1967 | Stored, Mt Barker | BG | Purchased in 1995 from AN | 963 at Mt Barker |
Diesel railcars
| 334 | 300 class "Red Hen" | 1958 | Operational | BG | Acquired in 2012 from Limestone Coast Railway, reactivated in 2014 | 334, 824, 424 |
| 364 | 300 class "Red Hen" | 1968 | Under restoration | BG | Donated in 1997 | 364 at Mt Barker |
| 405 | 400 class "Red Hen" | 1959 | Stored / source of spare parts | BG | Acquired in 2014 from Limestone Coast Railway | 405 at Mt Barker |
| 412 | 400 class "Red Hen" | 1960 | Operational | BG | Donated in 1994 | 412, trailer 824, 334, 424 |
| 424 | 400 class "Red Hen" | 1968 | Operational | BG | Acquired in 2014 from Limestone Coast Railway | 424 at Mt Barker |
| 428 | 400 class "Red Hen" | 1968 | Stored after collision with a truck | BG | Donated in 1997 | Damaged 428 |
| 435 | 400 class "Red Hen" | 1971 | Static display at Strathalbyn | BG | Purchased in 2010 from the Yorke Peninsula Railway | 435 at Strathalbyn |
| 820 824 830 | 820 class trailer | 1917 1912 1924 | 820 is a stored frame, 824 is operational, 830 is stored | BG | 2 are frames, 824 is operational | 824 at Mt Barker |
| 875 | 860 class trailer | 1945 | Operational | BG | Donated in 2019 by the History Trust of South Australia, moved from the National Railway Museum | 875 at Mt Barker |
| 43 | Brill Model 75 railcar | 1928 | Under restoration | BG | Fundraising: "$43 for 43" | |
| 60 | Brill Model 75 railcar | 1928 | Operational | BG | Was 207 then PWS28 then rebuilt to 60 | Brill 60 at Goolwa |
| 2010 | 2000 class "Jumbo" railcar | 1980 | Stored | BG | | |
| 2109 | 2000 class "Jumbo" railcar | 1980 | Stored | BG | | 2109 stored at Goolwa depot |
Passenger cars
End-loading baggage car: wooden "Centenary" cars nos 52, 54, 56, 60, 61, 62 and 66; wooden suburban cars nos 70, 71 and 73; wooden suburban baggage cars nos 81, 82 and 83; wooden 4400 class brakevan no. 4420; steel 500 class (country first-class) car no. 503 (limited use) End-loading Centenary car steel 600 class (country second-class) car no. 602, named "Bowmans"; steel 700 class (country second-class) cars nos 701, 704, 706 and 710; former V&SAR joint stock sleeper car "Finniss" (limited use); H type carriage sets SH21 (BCH121, BIH181 and BTH161) and SH25 (BCH125, BIH185 and BTH165) (ex V/Line); steel power car PH454 (ex V/Line); steel CGP class brakevan no. CGP2.
Rollingstock sold off or scrapped
| 526 Duchess of Gloucester | SAR 520 class | 1945 | Scrapped | BG | Hauled many excursion trains before being scrapped in 1971 | |
| 700 | SAR 700 class | 1926 | Scrapped | BG | Hauled many excursion trains before being scrapped in 1968 | |
| 718 | SAR 710 class | 1929 | Scrapped | BG | Hauled many excursion trains before being scrapped in 1968 | |
| 500 James McGuire | SAR 500 class | 1926 | Scrapped | BG | Hauled many excursion trains before being scrapped in 1965 | |
| 351 | SAR 350 class | 1949 | Static display | BG | Suffered a major engine failure in 1991. Delivered to Port Dock Station Railway Museum (now National Railway Museum) under a loan arrangement. Gifted to the Milang Historical Railway Museum in 2015. | |
| 900 class no. 907 | SAR 900 class | 1953 | Stored / source of parts | SG | Ran its first tour under SteamRanger ownership in 1986. In 2000, sold to Australian Locomotive and Railway Carriage Company for the MurrayLander service. In 2005, moved from SteamRanger's Strathalbyn yard to Tailem Bend. | |
| 900 class no. 909 | SAR 900 class | 1953 | Under reactivation | SG | Ran its first tour under SteamRanger ownership in 1986. In 2000, sold to Australian Locomotive and Railway Carriage Company. In 2005, moved from SteamRanger's Strathalbyn yard to Tailem Bend. | |
| Angas | V&SA sleeper | 1923 | Static Air B&B | BG | Sold in 1995 | |
| Coliban | V&SA sleeper | 1923 | Operational with Steamrail Victoria | BG | Sold in 1996 | |
| Inman | V&SA sleeper | 1923 | Operational with Steamrail Victoria | BG | Sold in 1996 | |
| Tambo | V&SA sleeper | 1919 | Operational with Victorian Goldfeilds Railway | BG | Sold in 1993 | |
| Lowanna | SAR 780 | 1942 | Operational with 707 Operations | BG | Sold in 1995 | |
| BE16 | VR BE | 1908 | Sold to YPR then sold to Steamrail | BG | Sold in 1993 | |
| BE18 | VR BE | 1909 | Sold to YPR then sold to Steamrail | BG | Sold in 1993 | |
| BE24 | VR BE | 1909 | Sold to YPR then sold to Steamrail | BG | Sold in 1993 | |
| 606 | SAR 600 | 1937 | Sold to National Railway Museum | BG | Sold in 2000 | |
| 712 | SAR 700 | 1941 | Sold to Murraylander | BG | Sold in 2000 | |
| 715 | SAR 700 | 1941 | Sold to Murraylander | BG | Sold in 1999 | |
Tables updated by NR17 Photography

== See also ==
- Rail transport in South Australia
- Railways in Adelaide
- Goolwa railway station
- Mount Barker railway station
- Port Elliot railway station
- Victor Harbor railway line
