= Strathalbyn railway station =

Railway station in South Australia, Australia

Strathalbyn
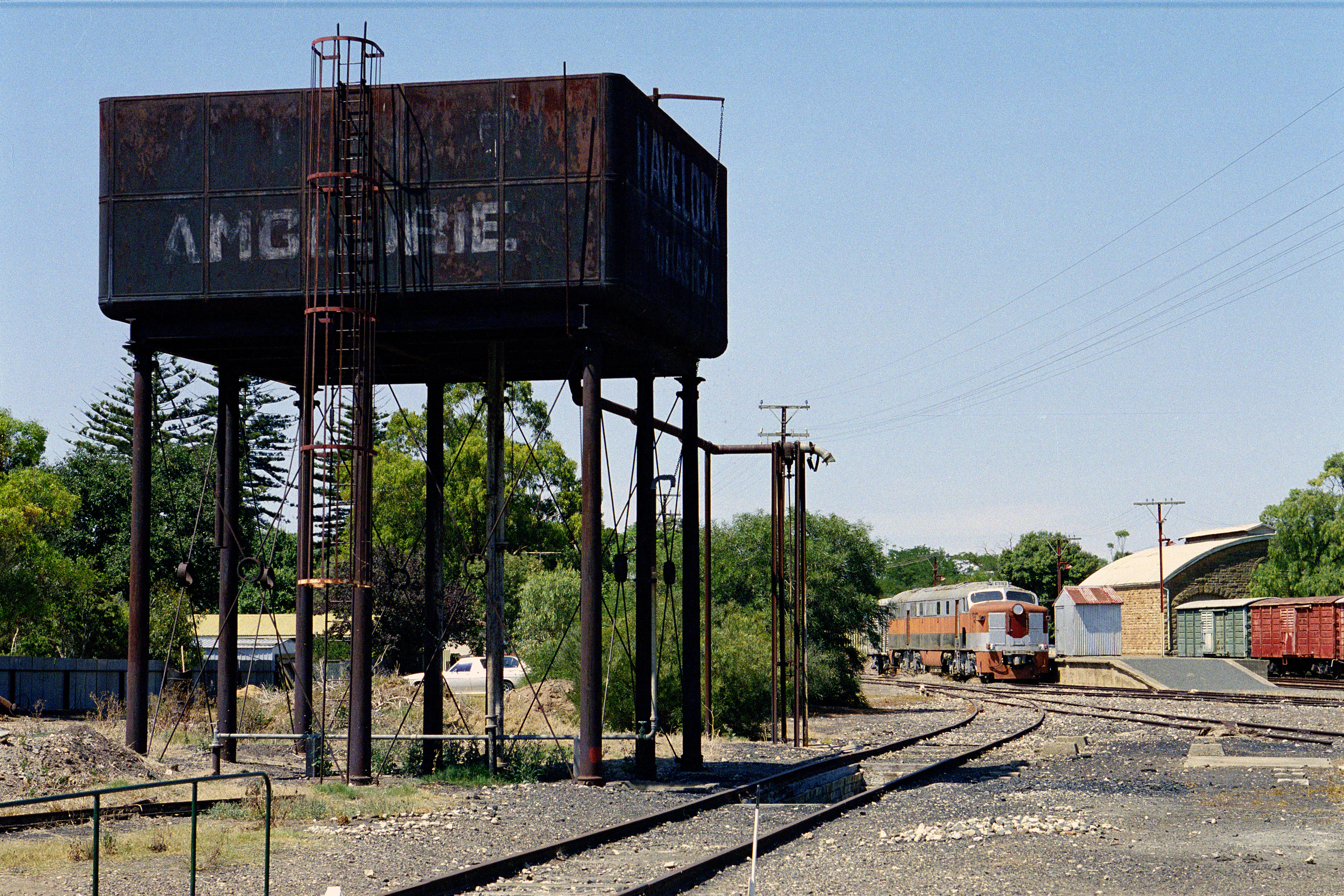
- Strathalbyn railway station yard (2014)

General information
- Location: South Terrace, Strathalbyn, South Australia
- Coordinates: 35.261492035303576°S 138.89221494655305°E
- Operator: Steamranger
- Line: Victor Harbor line
- Distance: kilometres from Adelaide
- Platforms: 1
- Tracks: 1

Construction
- Structure type: Ground

History
- Opened: 1869
- Closed: 1984

Services
Preceding station	South Australian Railways	Following station
Gemmells towards Adelaide	Victor Harbor railway line	Sandergrove towards Victor Harbor
Location

Strathalbyn railway station is a preserved railway station in the southeastern edge of the Adelaide Hills, South Australia, on the broad gauge Victor Harbor line, formerly operated by South Australian Railways and its successor, Australian National.

== History ==
Strathalbyn railway station opened in 1869 when the railway line was extended northwards towards Stathalbyn from Goolwa. The connection from Mount Barker reached the town in 1884 completing the railway line. Until 1884, trains south of Strathalbyn were hauled by horse power, but between 1883 and 1885 the section to Currency Creek was rebuilt to steam railway standards. The station building was constructed from Aldgate freestone during 1883. It was a variation of a standard design used at a number of SA locations and included a Stationmaster's quarters within the main building at the southern end. A stone goods shed was built in 1884.

Regular Australian National freight services ended in 1980 along with regular passenger services in 1984, largely because of the circuitous rail route between Adelaide and Victor Harbor and increasing ownership of motor cars.

== Present-day use ==
In 1989, a not-for-profit railway preservation organisation, SteamRanger, was established by the Australian Railway Historical Society to operate its heritage train tours from Adelaide to Victor Harbor through the station. Six years later, as part of the One Nation infrastructure program, the main line between Adelaide and Melbourne was converted to standard gauge, leaving Steamranger's depot at Dry Creek in metropolitan Adelaide isolated. In a major project, all of SteamRanger's locomotives, rolling stock and infrastructure were moved to Mount Barker station. The station was restored in recent years, the building is now shared between SteamRanger and local Arts and Crafts organisations who operate a small shop, art gallery and local information centre.
