= Track gauge conversion =

Change of rail tracks or rail vehicles to a different gauge

Track gauge conversion is the changing of one railway track gauge (the distance between the running rails) to another. In general, requirements depend on whether the conversion is from a wider gauge to a narrower gauge or vice versa, on how the rail vehicles can be modified to accommodate a track gauge conversion, and on whether the gauge conversion is manual or automated.

== Sleepers ==
If tracks are converted to a narrower gauge, the existing timber sleepers (ties) may be used. However, replacement is required if the conversion is to a significantly wider gauge. Some sleepers may be long enough to accommodate the fittings of both existing and alternative gauges. Wooden sleepers are suitable for conversion because they can be drilled for the repositioned rail spikes.

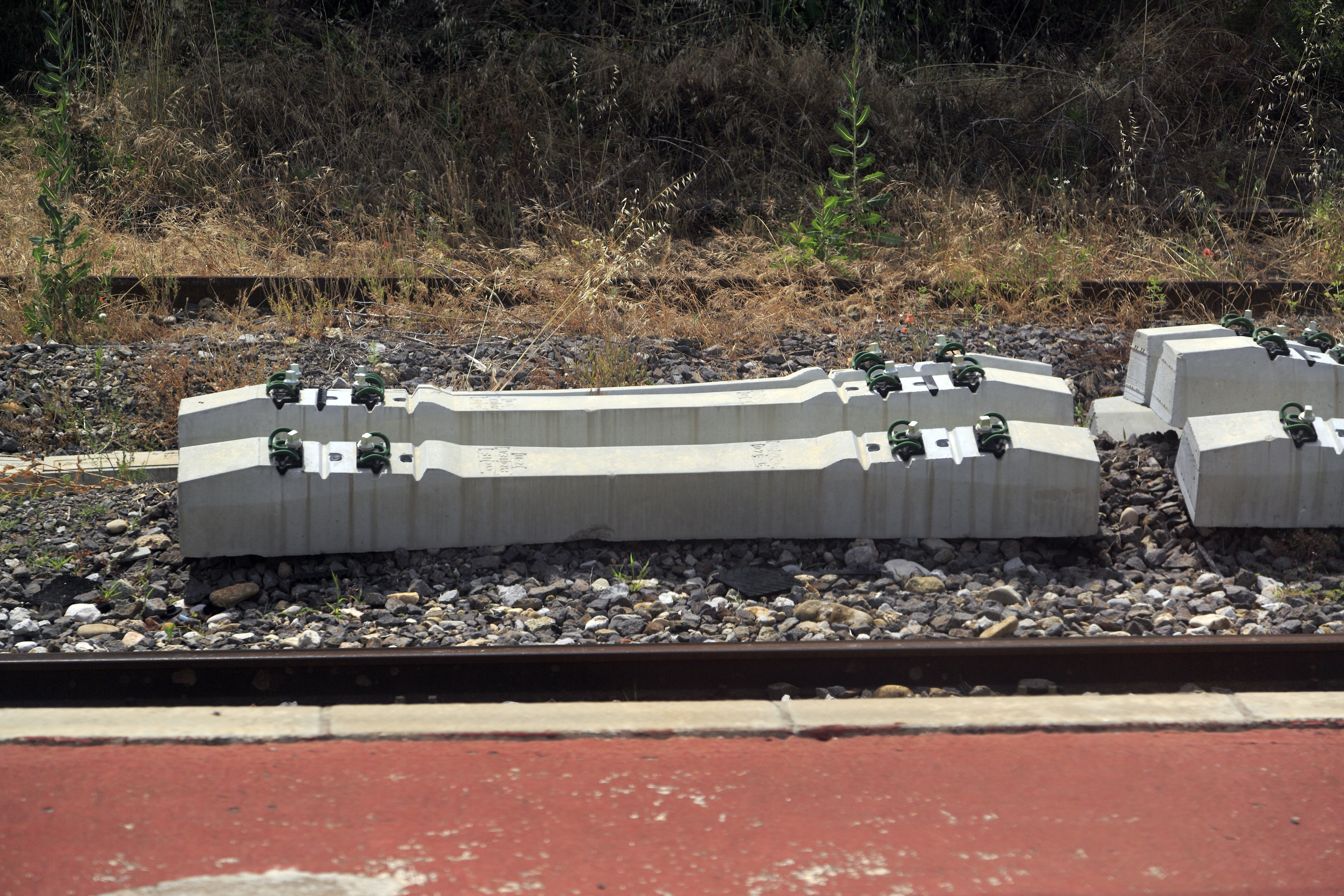
Convertible concrete sleepers in Spain prefitted for Iberian gauge and standard gauge, with rail fasteners currently in Iberian-gauge position.

Concrete sleepers are unsuitable for conversion. Concrete sleepers may be cast with alternative gauge fittings in place, an example being those used during the conversion of the Melbourne–Adelaide railway from 1600 mm (5 ft 3 in) to 1435 mm (4 ft 8 1/2 in). Steel sleepers may have alternative gauge fittings cast at production, may be drilled for new fittings or may be welded with new fittings.

== Structures ==
Conversion from a narrow to a wider gauge may require enlargement of the structure gauge of the bridges, overpasses and tunnels, embankments and cuts. The minimum curve radius may have a larger radius on broader gauges requiring route deviations to allow the minimum curve radius to be increased. Track centers at stations with multiple tracks may also have to be increased. Conversion from narrow to standard gauge can cause several changes not because of the gauge itself, but in order to be compatible with the structure gauge of standard gauge track, such as height of overpasses so that trains can be exchanged. The choice of train couplers may be a factor as well.

== Rail vehicles ==
Where vehicles move to a different gauge, they must either be prepared for bogie exchange or be prepared for wheelset exchange. For example, passenger trains moving between the 1435 mm (4 ft 8 1/2 in) in France and the 1668 mm (5 ft 5 21/32 in) gauge in Spain pass through an installation which adjusts their variable-gauge axles. This process is known as "gauge change". Goods wagons are still subject to either bogie exchange or wheelset exchange.

=== Steam locomotives ===
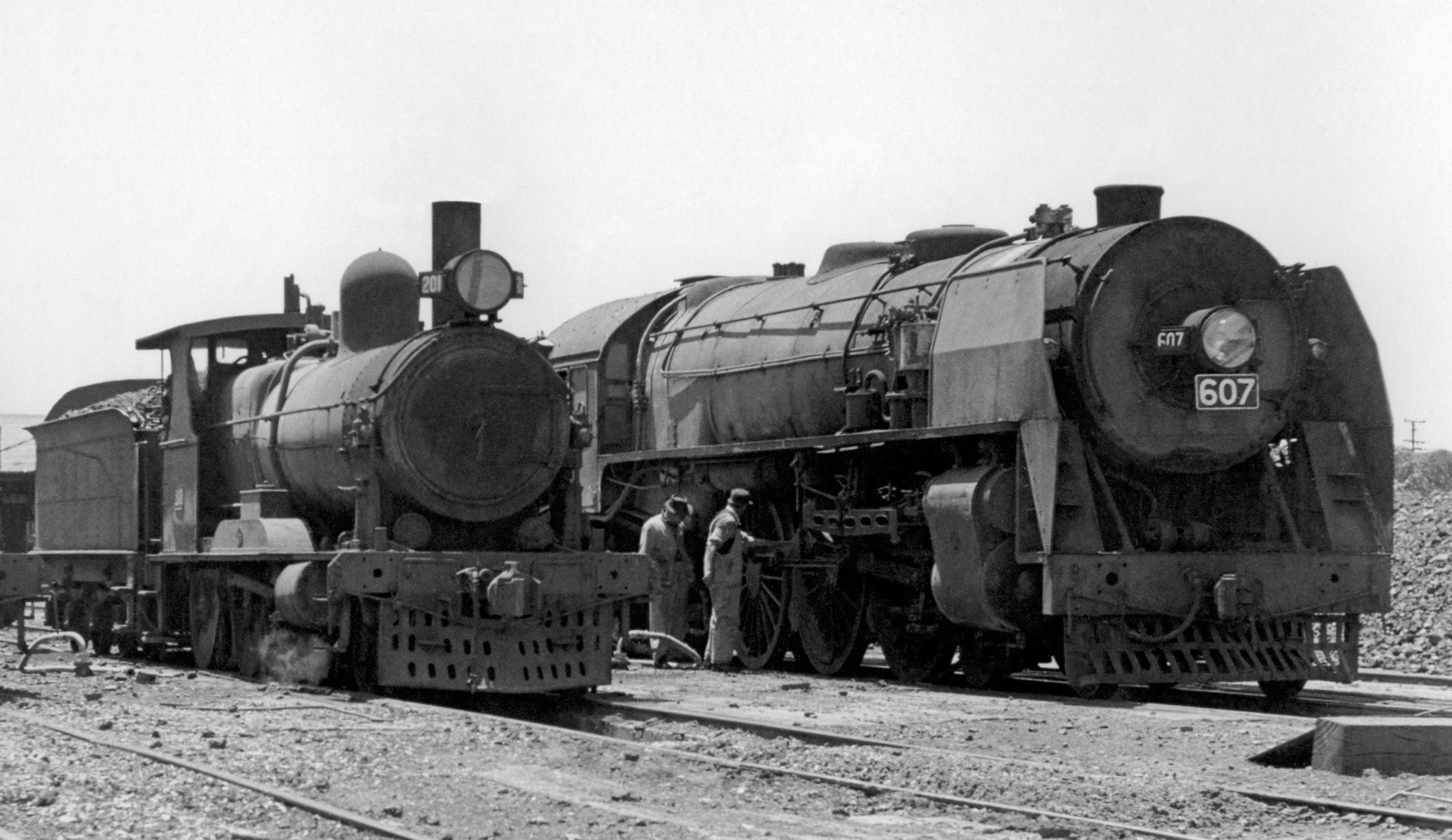
In Australia, the multiplicity of track gauges prompted locomotive builders, after the early 1920s, to provide for a potential change of gauge. Three classes of large locomotives ordered by the South Australian Railways in 1924, including the 600 class pictured here (right), were configured to permit easy conversion from 1600 mm (5 ft 3 in) broad gauge to 1435 mm (4 ft 8 1/2 in) standard gauge. The older Rx class locomotive next to it was incapable of being converted because its frames were too wide for standard gauge. (Note: Wheel centres were coned outwards by 41.275 millimetres (1.625 inches) for broad gauge. By removing the tyres, turning the wheel centres around and putting them back on again, coned inwards and replacing the tyres, the gauge would be narrowed by 165 millimetres (6.5 inches).)

Some steam locomotives were constructed to be reconfigured to a different gauge: for example, some East African Railways locomotives; Garratts; the large 500, 600 and 700 class locomotives of the South Australian Railways introduced by William Webb in 1926; and the Victorian Railways J, N and R classes. In the Australian instances, conversion was anticipated from 1600 mm (5 ft 3 in) broad gauge to 1435 mm (4 ft 8 1/2 in) standard gauge. Conversion to a wider gauge was similarly anticipated for the large 1067 mm (3 ft 6 in) narrow-gauge Western Australian Government Railways V class locomotive (to standard gauge). Of these locomotives, only one R class was converted (when in preservation). Two unanticipated conversions to occur were the ten locomotives of the South Australian Railways 740 class (from standard to broad gauge) and five 1067 mm (3 ft 6 in) narrow-gauge T class locomotives, which became the Tx class on the broad gauge before they were eventually converted back again.

Gauge-change in steam locomotives has a long lineage. In about 1860, the Bristol and Exeter Railway converted five 1435 mm (4 ft 8 1/2 in) locomotives to 7 ft 1/4 in (2140 mm) gauge, and later converted them back again. Also in the 19th century, in the United States, some 5 ft (1524 mm) broad-gauge locomotives were designed for easy conversion to 1,435 mm (4 ft 8 1/2 in) gauge, and in the United Kingdom some 7 ft 1/4 in (2140 mm) broad-gauge locomotive classes of the Great Western Railway were designed for easy conversion to 1435 mm (4 ft 8 1/2 in) gauge. After World War II, a number of captured German 03 class Pacifics locomotives were re-gauged to the 5 ft (1524 mm) Russian gauge.

=== Diesel and electric locomotives and trains ===
Most diesel and electric rolling stock can undergo gauge conversion by replacement of their bogies. Engines with fixed wheelbases are more difficult to convert. In Australia, diesel locomotives are regularly re-gauged between broad, standard and narrow gauges. The ALCO MRS-1 and its EMD counterpart were designed for easy gauge conversion to enable their use on multiple rail lines worldwide.

=== Wagons and coaches ===
Gauge conversion of wagons and coaches involves the replacement of the wheelsets or the bogies. In May 1892, wagons and coaches were converted when the 7 ft 1/4 in (2140 mm) gauge of the Great Western Railway was abandoned.

== Gauge orphan ==
During or after gauge conversion work, some stations and branch lines may become "gauge orphans". This occurs especially when it is not considered economically worthwhile to go to the expense of gauge conversion. For example, after the main line of the Adelaide–Wolseley railway line between Adelaide and Melbourne was converted in 1995 to standard gauge, the broad gauge Victor Harbor branch line became a gauge orphan because it was too lightly trafficked to be converted; it now prospers as a heritage line, SteamRanger.

== See also ==
- Rail transport
- List of gauge conversions
- Break-of-gauge
- Dual gauge
