= Mount Barker railway station =

Preserved railway station in South Australia

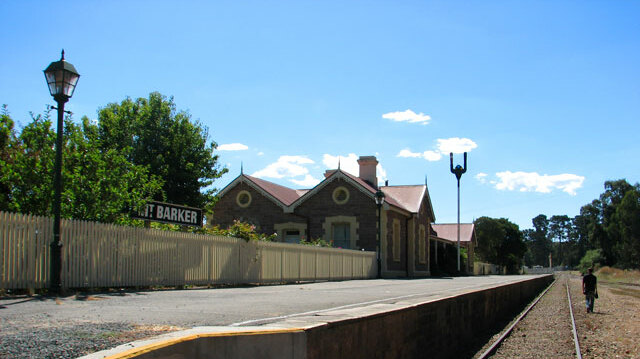

General information
- Location: Druids Avenue; Mount Barker
- Coordinates: 35°03′56″S 138°51′46″E
- Operator: SteamRanger; formerly South Australian Railways then Australian National Railways Commission
- Line: Victor Harbor line
- Bus routes: T840, 835, 835A, 837, 838, 838H, 839, 839R, 840X, 852, 853, 860F, 864, 864F, 864H, 882, 886, 887, 890

Construction
- Parking: yes
- Cycle facilities: yes

History
- Opened: 1883
- Closed: 1984

Services
Preceding station	South Australian Railways	Following station
Littlehampton Closed towards Adelaide	Victor Harbor railway line	Philcox Hill towards Victor Harbor
Location

Mount Barker railway station is a preserved railway station in the Adelaide Hills, South Australia, on the 1600 mm (5 ft 3 in) broad gauge Victor Harbor line, formerly operated by South Australian Railways and its successor, Australian National. When the nearby Adelaide-Melbourne railway line was converted to 1435 mm (4 ft 8 1/2 in) standard gauge in 1995, the line was disconnected. The station has become the headquarters of the Australian Railway Historical Society, a not-for-profit organisation trading as SteamRanger, which runs more than 200 trips per year, of various durations, on the line.

== History ==
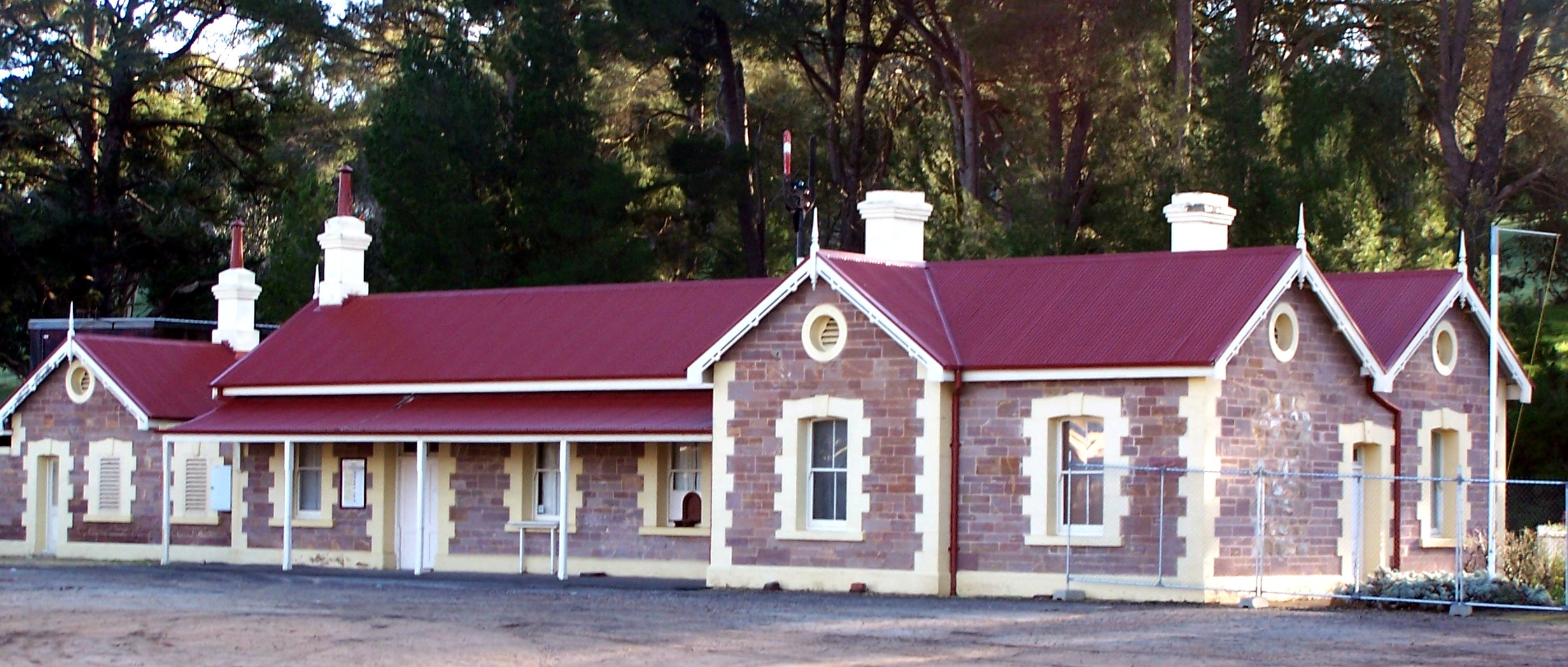
The 1883 station building, which became derelict after train services to Adelaide ended in 1984, was refurbished by the local council to be the headquarters for SteamRanger heritage rail operations

In 1884, an 80.6 kilometres (50 miles) branch line was completed between Mount Barker Junction and Victor Harbor. Substantial stations were erected at Mount Barker, Strathalbyn and Goolwa. The Mount Barker station building, opened on 27 November 1883, was built from distinctive Aldgate freestone; it included the stationmaster's quarters and a ticketing office.

Two years later, the first railway link between two colonial capital cities in Australia – Adelaide, South Australia and Melbourne, Victoria – was completed, to which the branch was connected at Mount Barker Junction, 5 route kilometres (3 miles) to the north of Mount Barker station.

Regular services operated until passenger numbers declined in the late 20th century, largely because of the circuitous rail route between Adelaide and Victor Harbor and increasing ownership of motor cars. Services were terminated in 1984.

As a result of rapid growth and traffic congestion on the South Eastern Freeway, sporadic calls have been made since the late 2010s to extend the former passenger rail service beyond Belair to Mount Barker. However, a 2022 government-sponsored report rejected the prospect of opening a train service, arguing that reliability and travel time would "not come close" to buses and cars.

== Present-day use ==
In 1989, a not-for-profit railway preservation organisation, SteamRanger, was established by the Australian Railway Historical Society to operate its heritage train tours from Adelaide to Victor Harbor through the station. Six years later, as part of the One Nation infrastructure program, the main line between Adelaide and Melbourne was converted to standard gauge, leaving Steamranger's depot at Dry Creek in metropolitan Adelaide isolated. In a major project, all of SteamRanger's locomotives, rolling stock and infrastructure were moved to Mount Barker station. As part of the move, the District Council of Mount Barker renovated the station building, at the time derelict, to become SteamRanger's base. SteamRanger's heritage locomotives and rolling stock provide more than 200 trips a year, conducted – as with maintenance and administration – entirely by volunteers.
