= South Australian Railways 500 class =

South Australian Railways 500 class may refer to:

- South Australian Railways 500 class (diesel)
- South Australian Railways 500 class (steam)
