= Mount Barker Junction railway station =

Former railway station in South Australia, Australia

Mount Barker Junction
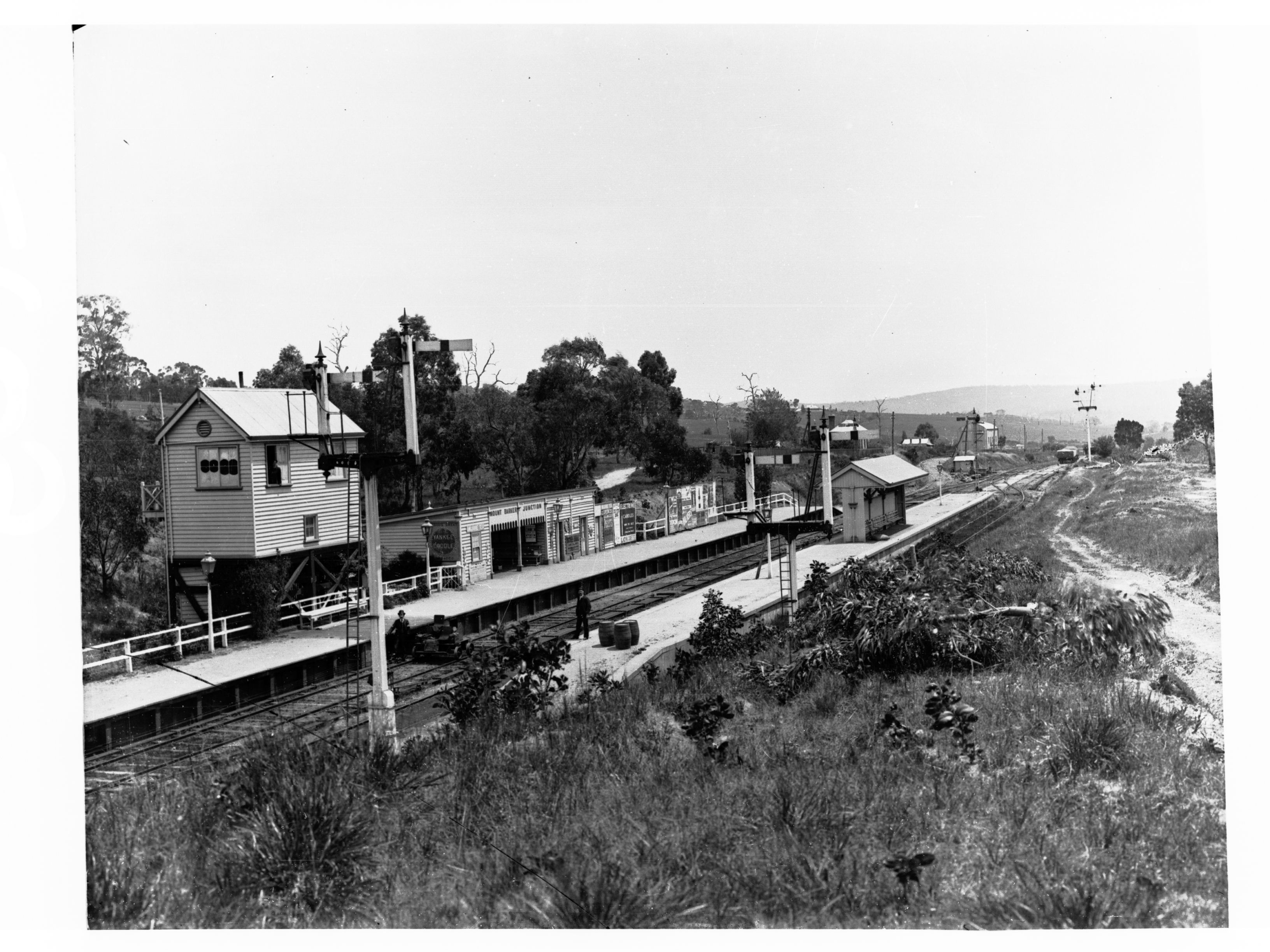
- The now disused Mt Barker Junction station

General information
- Location: Australia
- Coordinates: 35.02417°S 138.85914°E
- System: Former Australian National regional rail
- Operator: South Australian Railways / SteamRanger
- Lines: Adelaide-Wolseley; Victor Harbor
- Distance: 50.00 kilometres from Adelaide
- Platforms: 1
- Tracks: 3

Construction
- Structure type: Ground

Other information
- Status: Closed

History
- Opened: 1883
- Closed: 1980s
- Rebuilt: 1943

Services
Preceding station	Australian Rail Track Corporation	Following station
Balhannah towards Adelaide	Adelaide–Wolseley railway line	Nairne towards Serviceton
Preceding station	South Australian Railways	Following station
Balhannah towards Adelaide	Victor Harbor railway line	Littlehampton towards Victor Harbor
Location

Mount Barker Junction railway station is a disused station on the Adelaide to Wolseley line serving the South Australian city of Mount Barker. It was the junction for the Victor Harbor and Wolseley lines.

== History ==
Mount Barker Junction station opened in 1883, and consisted of a main platform with a timber station building identical to the one at Balhannah, with a tall signal box next to the building. An island platform was built as well. The timber building and signal box were replaced with the current brick building in 1943. The island platform was demolished around the time the station closed to passengers by 1984 when the passenger service to Victor Harbor ceased.

It became a junction station when the Victor Harbor line opened. When the Adelaide-Wolseley line was gauge converted to standard gauge in 1995, the Victor Harbor line was isolated from the rest of the Australian National network. SteamRanger subsequently relocated from Dry Creek to Mount Barker, and runs broad gauge services south on the line from Mount Barker station. Until 2005, SteamRanger ran a Junction Jogger service from Mount Barker station to this location, but ceased probably due to a worn-out track along this section.
