= South Australian Railways Brill railcar =

South Australian Railways railcars

Brill railcar
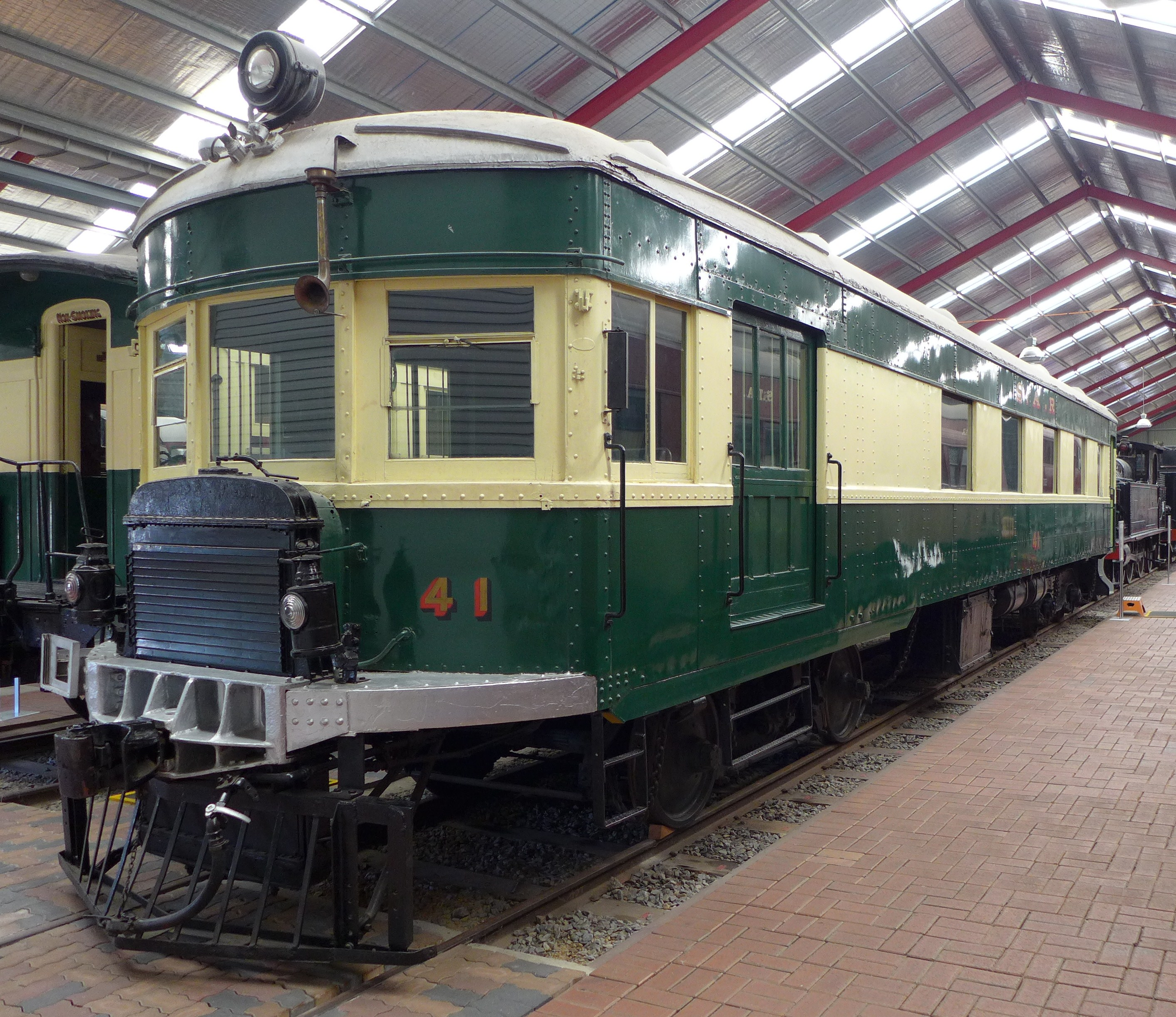
- Model 75 railcar no. 41 at the National Railway Museum, Port Adelaide
- In service: 1924–1971
- Manufacturers: J. G. Brill Company, Philadelphia, United States (chassis), Islington Railway Workshops (body)
- Constructed: 1924, 1926–1927, 1930
- Entered service: 1924–1925, 1927–1930
- Number built: Model 55: 12; Model 75: 39
- Fleet numbers: 4–15, 30–59, 100–106, 487. Power car converted from trailer by SteamRanger Heritage Railway: 60.
- Operators: South Australian Railways; SteamRanger Heritage Railway; Pichi Richi Railway
- Lines served: Adelaide suburban (broad gauge); country (broad and narrow gauge)

Specifications
- Prime movers: Model 55: Midwest 4-cylinder petrol engine; later refitted with Gardner 6LW six-cylinder diesel engines. Model 75: Winton 4-cylinder petrol engine, later refitted with Gardner 8L3 eight-cylinder diesel engines and in the 1950s with Cummins NHS 6 B1 diesel engines.
- Power output: Model 55: 68 hp (51 kW) (original), later refitted 102 hp (76 kW). Model 75: 186 hp (139 kW); Gardner re-fit 204 hp (152 kW).
- Transmission: Mechanical, with preselector: 4-speed manual
- Track gauge: 3 ft 6 in (1067 mm); 5 ft 3 in (1600 mm)

Two models of the Brill railcar were operated by the South Australian Railways (SAR) between 1925 and 1971. They were introduced to reduce the cost incurred by locomotive-hauled trains on lightly trafficked country routes and off-peak suburban services. The first, the Model 55, entered service in 1924; the larger Model 75 entered service in 1927. Both were deployed on suburban lines. At first the Model 55 also operated in country areas but soon the Model 75 serviced all but the principal country passenger services on the Adelaide, Peterborough and Murray Bridge Divisions and the South-East Subdivision. They were eventually replaced by the Bluebird and Red Hen railcars; the last units were withdrawn in 1971.

== Background ==
=== Model 55 ===
In 1923, SAR Commissioner William Webb ordered a group of railcars, and tenders were called. J. G. Brill Company won the contract to supply 12 railcar chassis, which would be mated to bodies constructed by Islington Workshops. With a length over the body of 42 feet (12.80 metres) and numbered 4 to 15, these 12 railcars entered service during 1924 with the Brill nomenclature, "Model 55", retained. They came with a 68 hp (51 kW) Midwest 4-cylinder petrol engine, and were later refitted with Gardner six-cylinder diesel engines. They were quickly deemed a success, although their ride was uncomfortable. The public knew them as "Barwell's Bulls", on account of Henry Barwell, the state premier who drove the SAR's reform at the time, and the bovine-sounding bellow of the railcar's horn. There was a longstanding aversion in the SAR to using that term. Another name used by the public, not unique to South Australia, was "tin hares".

The 55s were built for operation on the broad gauge network, although two (numbers 4 and 10) operated on the narrow gauge for a time, being renumbered 112 and 111 for the duration.

The last three Model 55 railcars were sent for scrapping in 1968.

=== Model 75 ===
Two years after the Model 55 was introduced, the J.G. Brill Company supplied the SAR with an enlarged version – 55 feet (16.8 metres) long over the body – known by the company and the SAR as the "Model 75". The first railcar was built by Brill as a pattern car; the remaining 38 were built by Islington Workshops, entering service in 1927. (Note: Car 30 was imported complete from J.G. Brill and entered service on 4 August 1926. Twelve months elapsed before Islington Workshops had assembled the next car on an imported chassis.) They differed from the 55s in having a Winton 4-cylinder petrol engine. The Model 75's 13 feet (3.96 metres) of extra length enabled a passenger capacity of 63 versus 43 in the Model 55. The first 30 (30–59) entered service on the broad gauge; the other eight (100–106 and 487) were built for narrow-gauge operation. They were married with 200 and 300 series trailer cars respectively. The SAR had a habit of changing the size of baggage compartments and seating arrangements during the life of each Model 75 power car.

The last Model 75 railcars were condemned in 1971.

== In service ==
Both models worked on country lines around South Australia, with the Model 75 predominating on longer routes soon after their introduction. Originally, Model 55s had a royal blue livery with lemon yellow lining, then – as had the 75s throughout – a brown colour scheme. To celebrate the 80th anniversary of the SAR in 1936, all Model 55s and 75s still in service were repainted in a green and cream livery, which they wore until retirement. Later, yellow and black stripes, followed by yellow and red, were added to the front and several metres on the sides of the Model 75s to increase visibility. From 1957, those stripes were replaced by two panels across the front, illuminated at night, with black and "Dayglo" orange inverted "V" stripes.

In 1928, a Model 75 and trailer were sold to the Victorian Railways, to become their 44RM and 200MT. This was as a trial for comparison with other railcars then in service. It regularly operated between Echuca and Toolamba. 44RM was damaged in a level crossing collision in 1944 and was scrapped. 200MT remained in service until the mid-1970s before being preserved at the Seymour Railway Heritage Centre. In 2018 it was transferred to the Daylesford Spa Country Railway, re-entering service in 2022.

From 1934, the SAR began re-powering the 55s with Gardner six-cylinder 102 horsepower (76 kW) diesel engines but, as a result of World War II, some railcars were not converted until after 1945. At the same time, multiple-unit controls were fitted to the Model 75s. In the 1950s, the 75s were re-powered with Cummins NHS 6 B1 diesel engines, as fitted to Bluebird railcars.

== Withdrawal and preservation ==
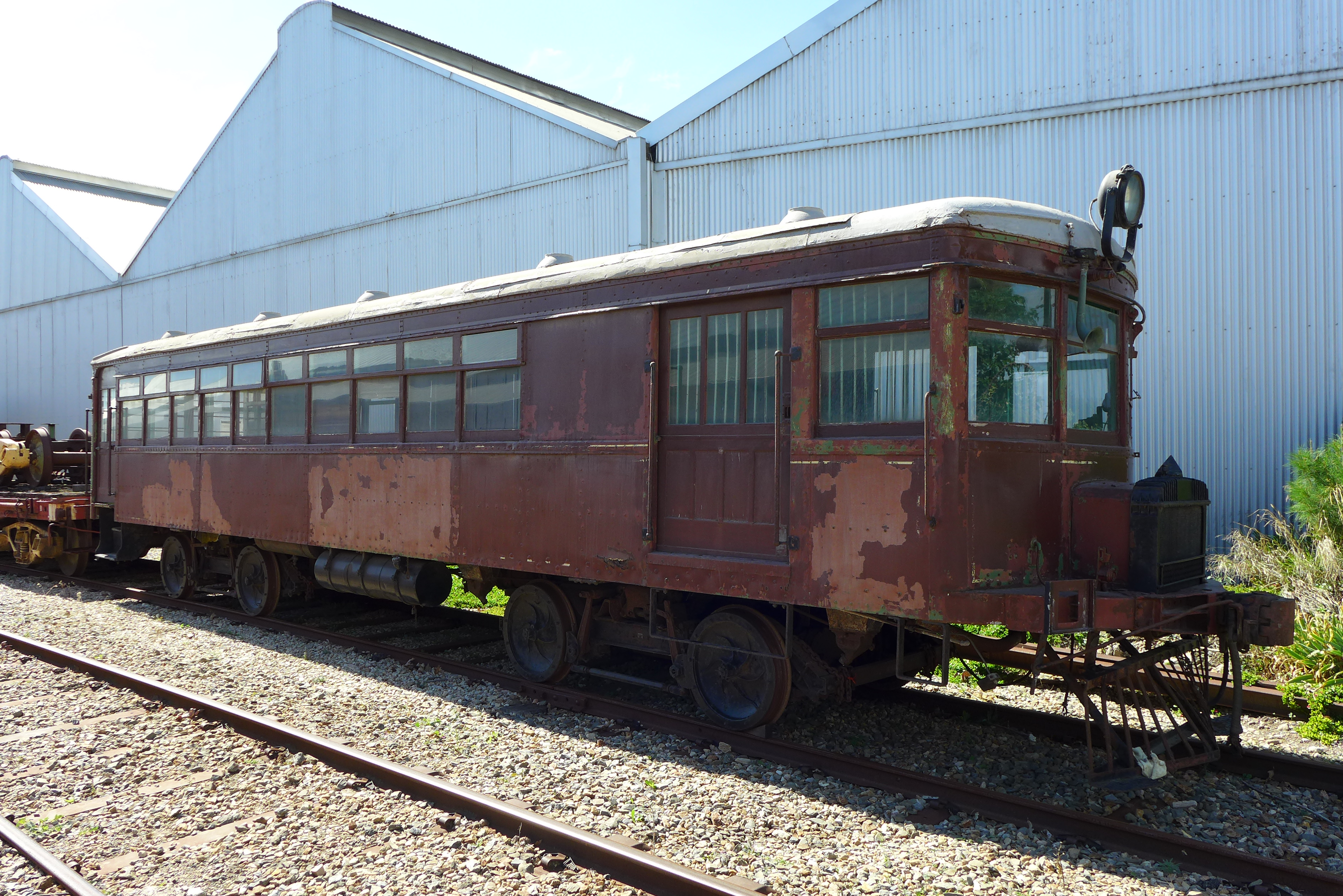
Preserved Model 55 railcar no. 8 at the National Railway Museum, Port Adelaide, 2014. As of 2025 it was undergoing long-term restoration.

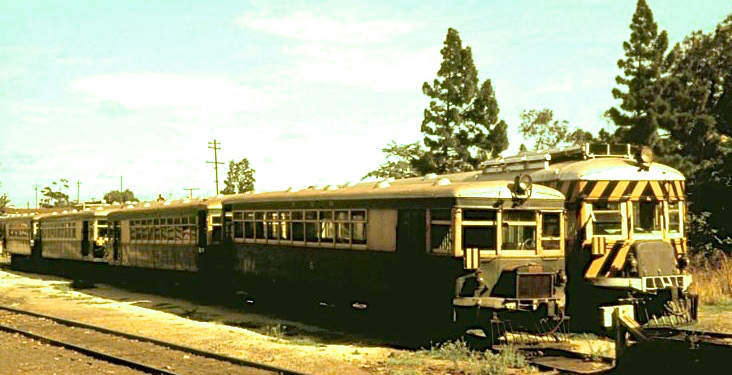
Brill Model 55 (left) and Model 75 railcars on the north railcar depot tracks at Adelaide railway station, 1962

The Brills were facing replacement during the 1950s. In 1955 the SAR introduced its Bluebird and Red Hen railcars, and they were moved to suburban services in Adelaide. As more Red Hens were constructed to replace them on the metropolitan lines, the last Brill railcars were withdrawn in October 1971. As at 30 June 1969, the last four in broad-gauge service had registered an average close to 1,642,000 miles (2,643,000 kilometres); on narrow gauge, car 102 recorded 1,549,000 miles (2,493,000 kilometres).

Five Brills have been preserved. Railcars no. 8 (Model 55) and no. 41 (Model 75) are at the National Railway Museum, Port Adelaide; no. 106 (Model 75) and trailer no. 305 are at the Pichi Richi Railway in operational condition. SteamRanger has no. 43 (Model 75) and no. 60 (Model 75), which was converted from condemned Brill trailer no. 207 in a years-long project

The remainder were scrapped – some after being converted to and used for some years as PWS class workers' sleeping cars – or used as accommodation at a motel, now closed, in the Barossa Valley.
