= Alan G. Pendleton =

Alan O'Brien George William Pendleton,CMG (17 May 1837 – 17 November 1916), commonly known as Alan George Pendleton was Commissioner of South Australian Railways 1895–1909.

== Career ==
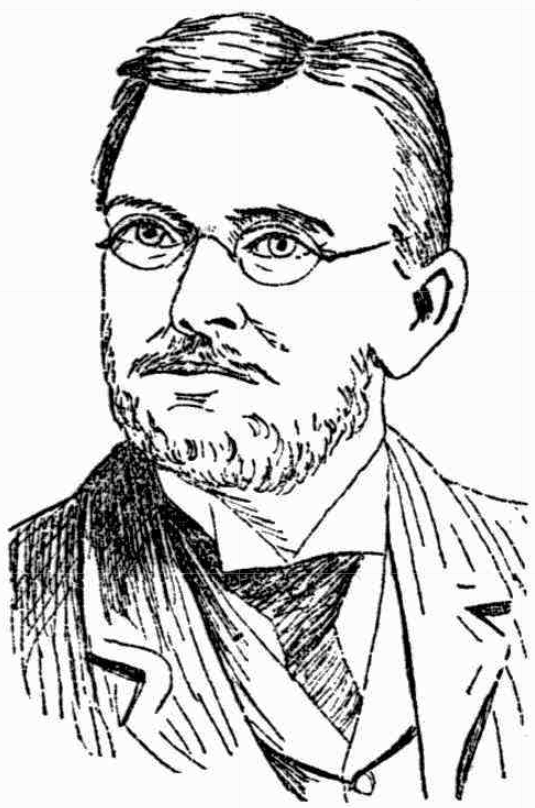
A. G. Pendleton in 1895

Pendleton was born in Collon, County Louth, Ireland, a son of Henry Latham Pendleton (c. 1792–1866), captain in the Louth Militia, who served in the Peninsula War and Crimean War before he retired. He was educated at Trim, County Meath and with a private tutor. At 18 years of age he began working as a clerk with the Manchester, Sheffield and Lincolnshire Railway, (later Great Central Railway Company). He was soon promoted to chief clerk to (later Sir) Edward Watkin, then put in charge of the section between Manchester and Retford, later made joint representative of that company and the Great Northern Railway Company of Ireland, the two having opened connections by steam packet. In 1861 he was appointed agent and manager of the Calcutta and South-Eastern Railway in India, holding that position for about seven years before he was compelled by ill-health to retire. He returned to Great Britain, and from 1869 to 1876 served as Assistant Superintendent of the Great Northern Railway Company.

In 1877 he arrived in South Australia to take up an appointment as General Traffic Manager of the South Australian Railways, and made significant staffing changes, resulting in considerable savings, and ushering in a period of great expansion. In 1887 an Act of Parliament was passed, which came into operation on 1 June 1888, passing control of the railways for seven years to a Board of Commissioners: J. H. Smith (Chairman), J. H. Hill, and A. S. Neill. On 1 June 1895, following the expiry of their term, Pendleton was appointed sole Commissioner, assisted by an Advisory Board.

John Burnett McNeil (1845–1925) took Pendleton's place as General Traffic Manager over the head of Henry McArthur, one of several controversial appointments by Pendleton.

He held the position until June, 1909, when he retired, and was succeeded by Alex B. Moncrieff, followed by James McGuire.

== Recognition ==
The honour of Companion of the Order of St Michael and St George was conferred on Pendleton by Edward VII in 1905.

== Personal ==
On 3 July 1877 Pendleton married Agnes Edis (died 1924), daughter of John Edis, of Cambridge, England. They had a home, "Carnagoen", at Mount Lofty, where he died. He was buried at the Church of St James, Blakiston. It is likely they had no children.

Dr Richard Warren Pendleton LRCSI (1865) MRCPI (1881) (c. 1841 – 4 March 1899) was a brother. He was practising in Liverpool, England, when around 1875 he left for South Australia on account of his health, settling in Port Augusta, where he was appointed Medical Officer to the prison and police, and honorary surgeon to the hospital. He was badly injured in a carriage accident, causing spine damage. His wife, Martha Christina Haig "Mottie" Pendleton, née Thompson, died at A. G. Pendleton's home on 12 December 1886. Dr Pendleton left Port Augusta in 1887 returned to England, where he died in 1899. Their only child, daughter Alaine Mary De Burgh Pendleton, married in England in 1894 Arthur Gayford.

== An obituary ==
"I had the pleasure of working with the late Mr. Alan G. Pendleton, C.M.G.. during the whole period of his connection with these railways, and can safely say he had not only the sincere respect, but the warmest regard of every man in the service. He was a man of the kindliest disposition, and truly one of those who did good by stealth. The State has lost a good citizen and many of us a dear friend. I was stationmaster in Port Pirie at the time of Mr Pendleton's arrival in this State. The railways at that time were under the general management of Mr H. C. Mais, the Engineer-in-Chief. Mr Pendleton. however, practically took over the control, and within a very short period completely reorganised the whole system of working, and I think I might say originated the methods now in operation. The late Mr Pendleton needs no encomiums from me. His ability as a railway man having been admitted throughout Australia; in fact, he was frequently referred to as the best railway administrator in the southern hemisphere." — James McGuire, acting Railways Commissioner
