= South Australian Railways 500 class (steam) =

Class of Australian 4-8-2 locomotives

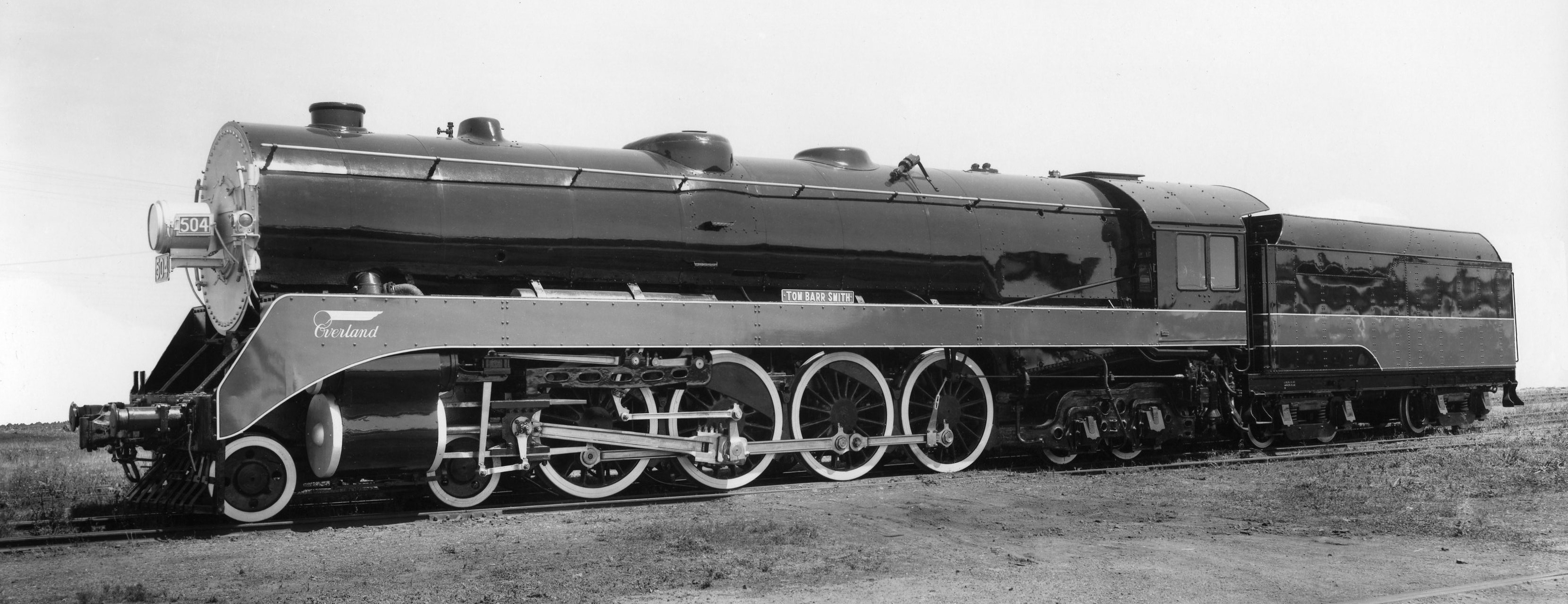
- South Australian Railways 500B class locomotive no. 504 "Tom Barr Smith", newly streamlined, about 1937
Type and origin
- Power type: Steam
- Designer: Alco (USRA Light Mikado) adapted by Fred Shea
- Builder: Armstrong Whitworth
- Serial number: 633-642
- Build date: 1925
- Total produced: 10
- Rebuilder: Islington Railway Workshops
- Rebuild date: 1929-1936
- Number rebuilt: 10
Specifications
- Configuration
  - Whyte: As built: 4-8-2 2'D1' 2'2′ After boosters installed:4-8-4 2'D2' 2'2'
- Gauge: 1600 mm (5 ft 3 in)
- Leading dia.: 33 in (838 mm)
- Driver dia.: 63 in (1600 mm)
- Trailing dia.: 36 in (914 mm) 42 in (1067 mm)
- Length: 83 ft 11 in (25,578 mm) (as built); 84 ft 2 in (25,654 mm) (upgraded)
- Height: 13 ft 11 1/2 in (4,254.5 mm)
- Axle load: 22 long tons 7 hundredweight 2 quarters (25.06 short tons; 22.73 t) (as built); 222 long tons 3 hundredweight (24.8 short tons; 22.5 t) (rebuilt)
- Adhesive weight: 88.85 long tons (99.51 short tons; 90.28 t) (as built); 87.20 long tons (97.66 short tons; 88.60 t) (rebuilt)
- Loco weight: 135.80 long tons (152.10 short tons; 137.98 t) (as built); 143.80 long tons (161.06 short tons; 146.11 t) (rebuilt)
- Tender weight: 85.15 long tons (95.37 short tons; 86.52 t) (as built); 78.80 long tons (88.26 short tons; 80.06 t) (rebuilt)
- Total weight: 218 long tons 13 hundredweight (244.9 short tons; 222.2 t) (as built); 222 long tons 6 hundredweight (249.0 short tons; 225.9 t) (rebuilt)
- Fuel type: Coal
- Fuel capacity: 12 long tons (13 short tons; 12 t) (as built); 11 long tons (12 short tons; 11 t) (rebuilt)
- Water cap.: 8,300 imperial gallons (10,000 US gal; 38,000 L) as built (Water capacity reduced to 7,100 imperial gallons (8,500 US gal; 32,000 L) in 1930); 7,000 imperial gallons (8,400 US gal; 32,000 L) (rebuilt)
- Firebox
  - Grate area: 66.6 sq ft (6.19 m^{2})
- Boiler pressure: 200 psi (1,379 kPa)
- Heating surface
  - Firebox: 395 sq ft (36.7 m^{2})
  - Tubes and flues: 3,253 sq ft (302.2 m^{2})
- Superheater
  - Heating area: 835 sq ft (77.6 m^{2})
- Cylinders: 2
- Cylinder size: 26 in × 28 in (660 mm × 711 mm)
- Valve gear: Walschaerts valve gear
- Valve type: Piston
Performance figures
- Tractive effort: 51,000 lb (23,000 kg) (as built); 59,000 lb (27,000 kg) (with booster)
- Factor of adh.: 4
Career
- Operators: South Australian Railways
- Class: 500
- Number in class: 10
- Numbers: 500–509
- First run: 22 May 1926
- Last run: 11 May 1963
- Withdrawn: 1958–1963
- Preserved: 504
- Scrapped: 1961–1965
- Disposition: 1 preserved, 9 scrapped

The South Australian Railways 500 class is a class of 4-8-2 steam locomotives introduced by the former South Australian Railways (SAR) in 1925. The locomotives were upgraded in 1929 by the installation of booster engines to increase the tractive effort to 59,000 pounds-force (260 kN). The resulting 500B class, with a 4-8-4 wheel arrangement, was briefly the most powerful steam locomotive class to operate in Australia until supplanted by the slightly more powerful NSWGR D57 class 4-8-2. During the late 1930s, the SAR followed the image-building trends being pursued by overseas railroads, covering all but two of the locomotives' piping and plumbing with a smooth casing and adding valances under the running boards. The last of the class was withdrawn from service in 1963.

== History ==
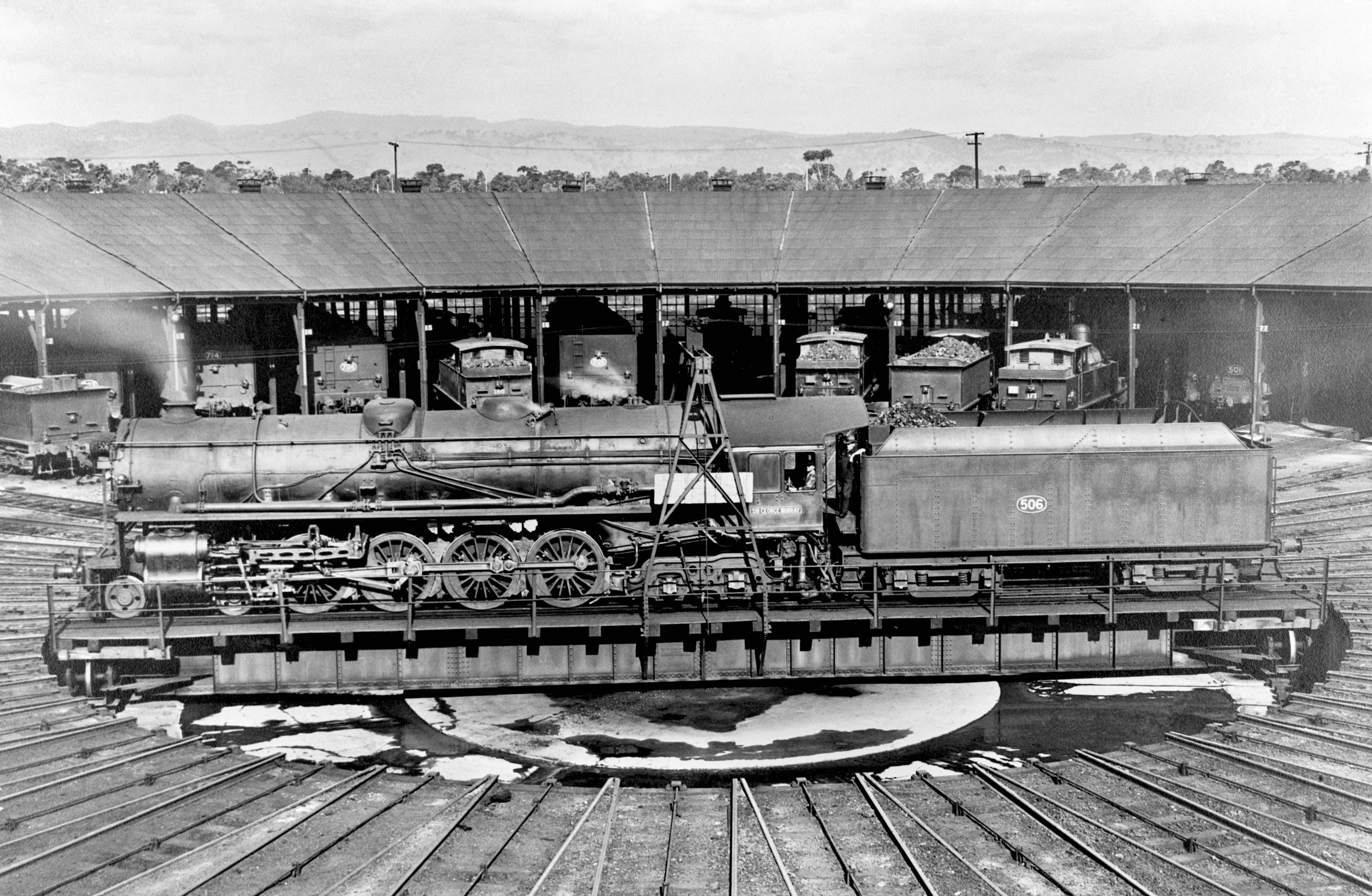
Although no. 502 and 506 were included in the class's upgrade to a boostered 4-8-4 wheel arrangement in 1929, they remained in non-streamlined form throughout their service. Here no. 506 is on the 85-foot turntable in the roundhouse at Mile End locomotive depot, Adelaide

The 500 class were part of larger order for 30 steam locomotives placed with Armstrong Whitworth, England, in 1924, as part of the rehabilitation of the state's rail system being overseen by Railways Commissioner William Webb. They replaced the Rx and S class locomotives, many dating back to 1894, that were still performing mainline duties, meaning that double and even triple heading was common. All ten 500-class locomotives arrived in Adelaide in 1926, and entered service on the Adelaide to Wolseley line as far as Tailem Bend. All were named after notable South Australians.

== Rebuilding ==
In May 1928, 506 was experimentally fitted with a booster in a newly built four-wheel trailing truck, replacing the original unpowered two-wheel truck. The modification, popular in the United States, proved highly successful, increasing the locomotive's tractive effort from 51,000 pounds-force (230 kN) to 59,000 pounds-force (260 kN). Boosters were subsequently fitted to the nine remaining locomotives, resulting in the class changing to 500B – although their popular name, among railway employees and the public alike, remained "Mountain class" rather than their new "Northern" configuration. With their upgraded tractive effort, the 500B class briefly became the most powerful non-articulated steam locomotives to operate in Australia until supplanted the following year by the New South Wales D57 class.

Throughout the mid-1930s, all but two of the locomotives in the class were semi-streamlined and had valances fitted. The first two locomotives were withdrawn from service in 1955 and the last was withdrawn in 1963.

504 is preserved as a static exhibit at the National Railway Museum, Port Adelaide.

== Class list ==
Number	Date in service	Date condemned	Name
500	4 June 1926	May 1963	James McGuire
501	2 July 1926	September 1958	Sir Henry Barwell
502	22 May 1926	July 1961	John Gunn
503	23 July 1926	July 1962	RL Butler
504	18 October 1926	July 1962 (Preserved)	Tom Barr Smith
505	28 October 1926	July 1962	Sir Tom Bridges
506	25 October 1926	July 1962	Sir George Murray
507	12 October 1926	March 1958	Margaret Murray
508	14 September 1926	July 1962	Sir Lancelot Stirling
509	24 August 1926	July 1961	WA Webb
