= South Australian Railways 500 class (diesel) =

Class of Australian diesel-electric locomotives

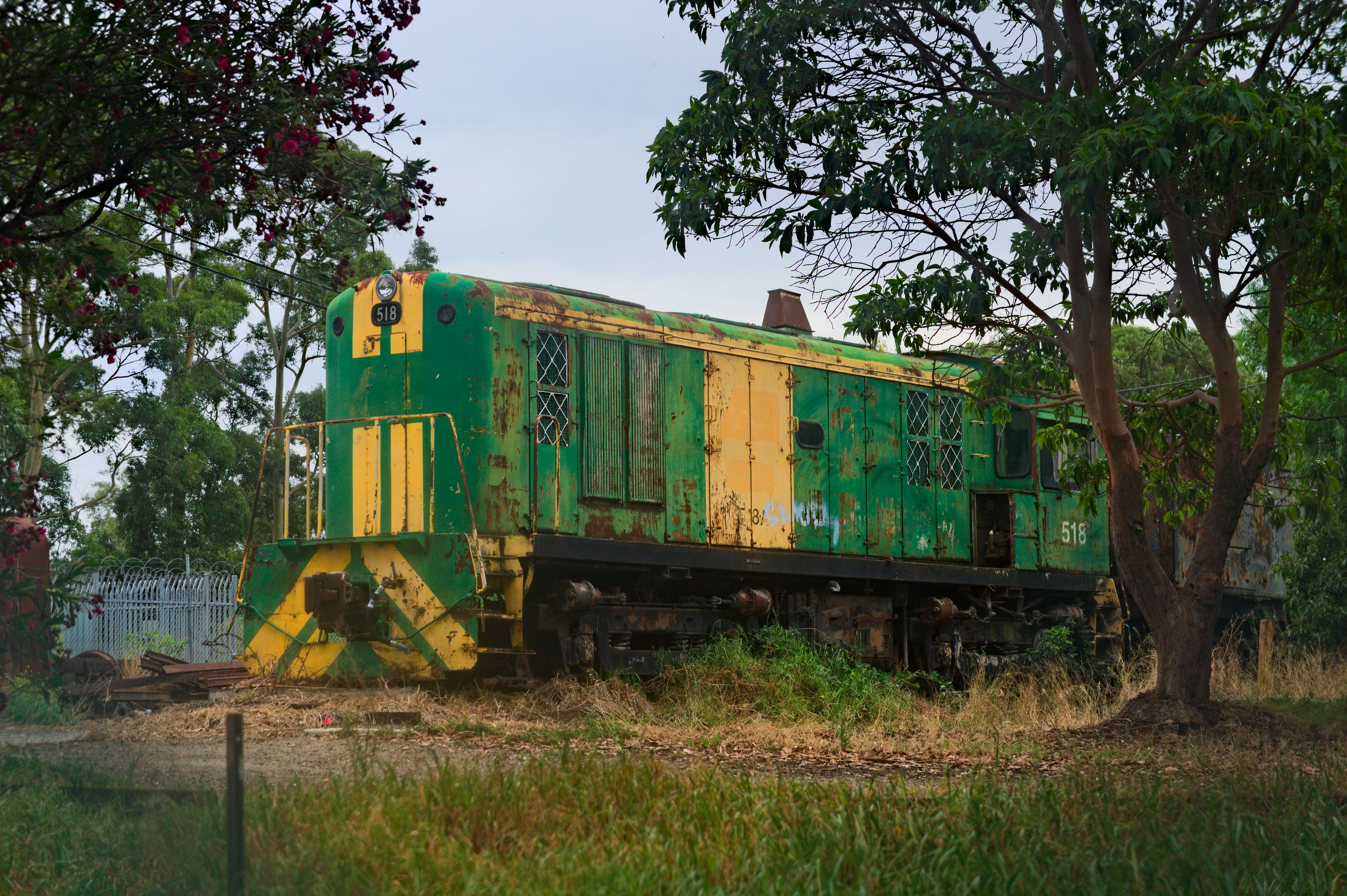
- 518 stored at Newport Railway Workshops in Australian National paint scheme, 2026
Type and origin
- Power type: Diesel-electric
- Builder: Islington Railway Workshops
- Build date: 1964-1969
- Total produced: 34
Specifications
- Configuration
  - UIC: Bo-Bo
- Gauge: 1,435 mm (4 ft 8 1/2 in), 1,600 mm (5 ft 3 in)
- Wheel diameter: 3 ft (914 mm)
- Minimum curve: 264 ft (80.467 m)
- Wheelbase: 28 ft (8.534 m) total, 7 ft 6 in (2.286 m) bogie
- Length: 38 ft 6 in (11.735 m) over headstocks
- Width: 9 ft 4 in (2.845 m)
- Height: 13 ft 3 1/2 in (4.051 m)
- Axle load: 14 long tons (14.2 tonnes; 15.7 short tons)
- Loco weight: 56 long tons (56.9 tonnes; 62.7 short tons)
- Fuel capacity: 700 imp gal (3,182 L; 841 US gal)
- Prime mover: English Electric 4SRKT Mk II
- RPM range: 450–850 rpm
- Engine type: four stroke, four valves per cylinder
- Aspiration: turbocharged
- Generator: EE827/4C
- Traction motors: Four EE548/2A
- Cylinders: 4 inline
- Cylinder size: 10 in × 12 in (254 mm × 305 mm)
- Loco brake: Air
- Train brakes: Air
Performance figures
- Maximum speed: 40 miles per hour (64 km/h)
- Power output: 550 hp (410 kW) gross, 500 hp (370 kW) net
- Tractive effort: 30,000 lbf (133.4 kN) at 4 mph (10 km/h)
Career
- Operators: South Australian Railways
- Number in class: 34
- Numbers: 500-534
- First run: 25 April 1964
- Preserved: 507, 515, 517, 527, 532
- Disposition: 5 preserved, 3 stored, 26 scrapped

The 500 class is a class of South Australian Railways diesel shunter locomotives built at Islington Railway Workshops between 1964 and 1969.

== History ==
Thirty-four 500 class locomotives were built, all incorporating English Electric traction and control equipment. The first 27 were built with broad gauge bogies, the last seven with standard gauge bogies. They operated in yards at Gladstone, Murray Bridge, Naracoorte, Peterborough, Port Pirie, Tailem Bend and Wallaroo, and were deployed extensively in Adelaide.

In March 1978 all were included in the transfer of the South Australian Railways to Australian National. Some were transferred to Port Augusta. In 1986, a new computer system required the class leaders of the former South Australian Railways to be renumbered as the last member of the class, with 500 becoming 534.

Most were scrapped in the mid-1990s, and the remaining locomotives were included in the sale of Australian National's South Australian operations to Australian Southern Railroad in October 1997.

== Surviving locomotives ==
- 507 owned by SteamRanger, where it is commonly used on Cockle Train duties between Goolwa and Victor Harbor
- 508 was owned by Aurizon and stored at Whyalla, South Australia, but has since been preserved.
- 515 preserved at the National Railway Museum, Port Adelaide as their standard gauge shunter
- 517 was donated to the National Railway Museum, Port Adelaide by Genesee & Wyoming Australia, stored
- 518 is privately owned, stored at the Newport Railway Workshops, Victoria.
- 527 was donated to SteamRanger by Australian Railroad Group in October 2010, but wasn't delivered to Mount Barker until 28 March 2026 due to the cost involved in relocating it.
- 532 was donated to Steamtown Heritage Rail Centre by Genesee & Wyoming Australia in June 2012

== Status table ==
The disposition of 500 class locomotives as of 2026 is as shown in the following table:

Number	Current Number	Entered service	Owner	Status	Livery	Gauge	Notes	Photo
507	507	6.4.1965	SteamRanger Heritage Railway	Operational	SAR Red and Yellow	BG	Operates on the Cockle train on some weekends	507 at goolwa
508	508	3.5.1965	ALARC	Stored	G&W Orange with a black roof	SG	Stored pending restoration to mainline operation	508 at Tailem Bend
515	515	29.12.1966	National Railway Museum, Port Adelaide	Operational	SAR Red and Yellow	SG	Standard Gauge shunter at the museum	515 at NRM
517	517	23.2.1967	National Railway Museum, Port Adelaide	Static display	Australian National green with G&W logos	BG	Was delivered by 704 and 831	517 at NRM
518	518	17.3.1967	Privately owned at the Newport Workshops	Stored	Australian National	BG	Out the back near the fence	518 at Newport
527	527	17.2.1969	SteamRanger Heritage Railway	Stored	G&W Orange with a black roof	BG	Delivered from WA in 2026	527 at Mt Barker
532	532	1.6.1964	Steamtown Heritage Rail Centre	Static display	Modified SAR Red and Yellow	SG	Inside the main shed with 704 and T199	532 at Peterborough
533	53	1.7.1969	Rail First Asset Management	Stored	Blue and Yellow but heavily vandalised	SG	Was a shunter now stored at the Islington Railway Workshops	533 at Islington

Table by NR17 Photography
