= South Australian Railways R class =

Class of broad-gauge 4-6-0 locomotives

South Australian Railways R & Rx class
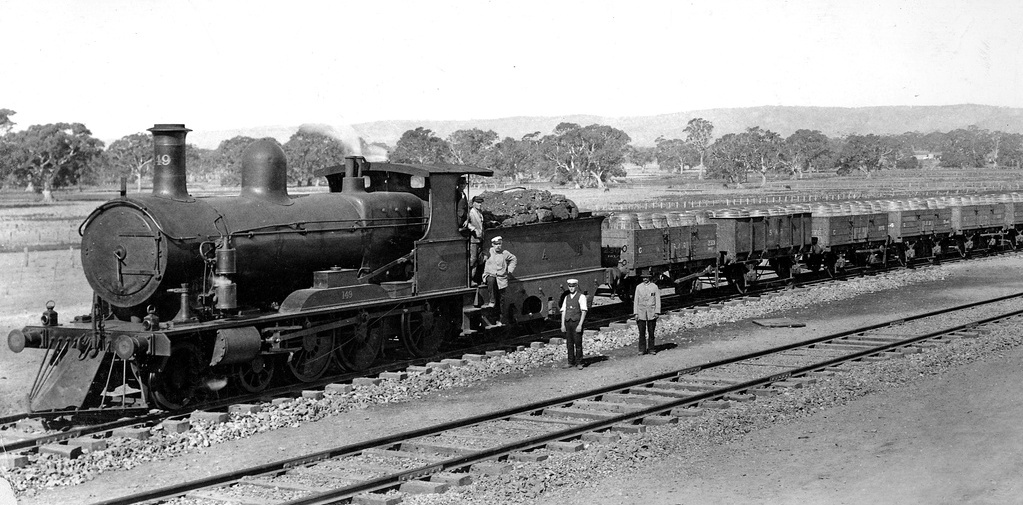
- Rx149 with a load of wine barrels at McLaren Vale, 1920
Type and origin
- Power type: Steam
- Builder: Dübs & Co (6); James Martin & Co (24); Islington Railway Workshops (14); North British Locomotive Company (15); Walkers Limited (25)
- Build date: 1885–1916
- Total produced: 84
- Rebuilder: Islington Workshops
- Rebuild date: 1899–1913 as Rx
- Number rebuilt: 30 to Rx
Specifications
- Configuration
  - Whyte: 4-6-0 (2′C 3) (2′C 2′2′)
- Gauge: 1600 mm (5 ft 3 in)
- Leading dia.: 2 ft 11 in (889 mm)
- Driver dia.: 4 ft 6 in (1372 mm)
- Length: 49 ft 11 in (15.215 m)
- Height: 13 ft 4 in (4064 mm)
- Axle load: 9 long tons 17 cwt (22,100 lb or 10 t) (R); 11 long tons 8 cwt (25,500 lb or 11.6 t) (Rx)
- Adhesive weight: 28.50 long tons 0 cwt (63,800 lb or 29 t)
- Loco weight: 40 long tons (45 short tons; 41 t) (R)
- Tender weight: 22 long tons (25 short tons; 22 t) (R)
- Total weight: 65 long tons (73 short tons; 66 t) (R), 88 long tons (99 short tons; 89 t)
- Fuel type: Coal
- Fuel capacity: 4 long tons 18 cwt (11,000 lb or 5 t) (R), 7 long tons 16 cwt (17,500 lb or 7.9 t) (Rx), 6 long tons 17 cwt (15,300 lb or 7 t) (Rx 6 wheel tender)
- Water cap.: 2040 imp gal (2450 US gal; 9300 L) (R); 3750 imp gal (4500 US gal; 17,000 L) (Rx), 3200 imp gal (3800 US gal; 15,000 L) (Rx 6 wheel tender)
- Firebox
  - Grate area: 17.6 sq ft (1.64 m^{2}) (R); 20.37 sq ft (1.892 m^{2}) (Rx)
- Boiler pressure: 145 psi (1000 kPa) (R); 175 psi (1207 kPa) (Rx)
- Heating surface
  - Firebox: 98.3 sq ft (9.13 m^{2}). (R); 105 sq ft (9.8 m^{2}) (Rx)
  - Tubes: 1196 sq ft (111.1 m^{2}) (R); 1,208 sq ft (112.2 m^{2}) (Rx)
- Superheater
  - Heating area: 178 sq ft (16.5 m^{2}) (Rx) (not fitted to some locos)
- Cylinders: 2
- Cylinder size: 18 in × 24 in (457 mm × 610 mm)
- Valve gear: Allan Straight Link
- Valve type: Piston
Performance figures
- Tractive effort: 17,700 lbf (78.73 kN) (R); 21,420 lbf (95.28 kN) (Rx)
- Factor of adh.: 3.49
Career
- Operators: South Australian Railways
- Class: R/Rx
- Number in class: 84
- Numbers: 5, 9, 10, 15, 20*, 25*, 48, 55, 56, 91*–96*, 102*–107*, 138*–153*, 155, 158, 160, 190–203, 206–235 (* originally built as R class)
- First run: 10 February 1886
- Last run: 5 September 1969
- Withdrawn: 1927–1969
- Preserved: All Rx: 5, 55, 93, 160, 191, 201, 207, 217, 224 and 231
- Scrapped: 1928–1974
- Disposition: Ten preserved, remainder scrapped

The South Australian Railways R class was a class of 4-6-0 steam locomotives operated by the South Australian Railways. The initial 30 of the class were upgraded and reclassified as the Rx class; the 54 later acquisitions were built to Rx specifications.

== History ==
In 1886, Dübs and Company of Glasgow, UK delivered the first six R class locomotives. A further 24 were built by James Martin & Co, of Gawler SA by November 1895. Starting in 1899, all of the class were rebuilt with Belpaire boilers, achieving a 20 per cent increase in tractive effort. They were reclassified as Rx class engines. A further 54 locomotives were built as Rx class by the Islington Railway Workshops, North British Locomotive Company, Glasgow and Walkers Limited, Maryborough, Queensland. All were in service by May 1916.

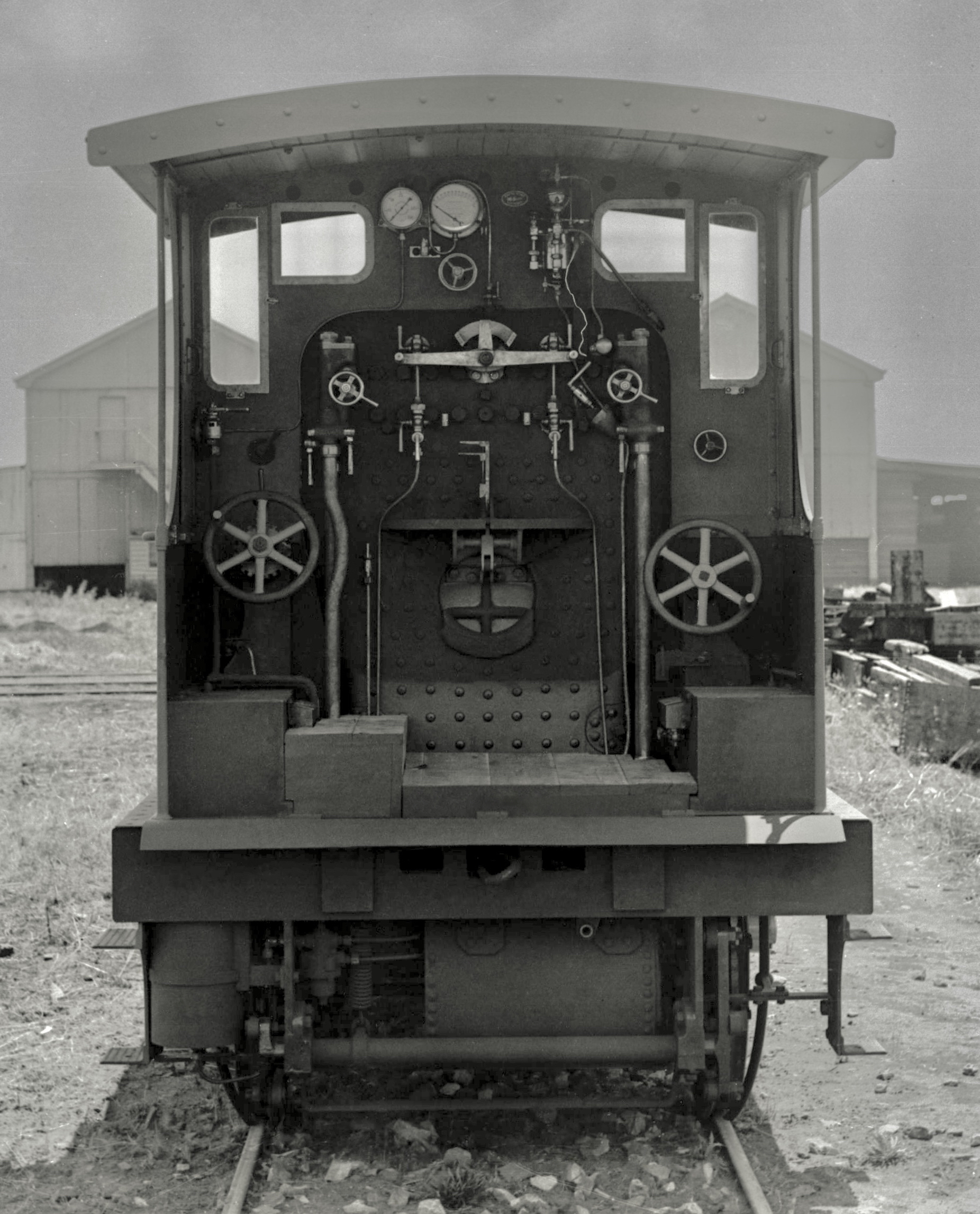
Backhead and cab of an Rx class locomotive after rebuild from R class

At the outset, the locomotives were the predominant class used on broad-gauge mainline services in South Australia. After railways commissioner William Webb introduced large locomotives of contemporary American design in the early 1920s, their roles were reduced to hauling freight and mixed (passenger and freight) trains on secondary mainlines, Adelaide suburban passenger trains and regional branchline passenger trains; and shunting in freight yards. A large group of Rx class locomotives, mainly early builds, were withdrawn from service in 1934; the remainder continued to serve into the mid-1960s.

== Preservation ==
Ten members of the class remain in various states of preservation.

- Rx5: displayed outdoors at Kapunda.
- Rx55: displayed outdoors at Loxton.
- Rx93: displayed indoors at National Railway Museum, Port Adelaide.
- Rx160:awaiting cosmetic restoration at Murray Bridge.
- Rx191: displayed outdoors with an uncertain future at Victor Harbor.
- Rx201: displayed outdoors at Tailem Bend.
- Rx207: operational at SteamRanger, Mount Barker.
- Rx217: displayed outdoors at Nuriootpa.
- Rx224: operational at SteamRanger, Mount Barker.
- Rx231: displayed outdoors at Kadina.
