= James McGuire (railways) =

James McGuire (14 July 1856 – June 1927 ) was Commissioner of Railways in South Australia at the end of a career which lasted 57 years.

== History ==
Maguire was born in North Adelaide, the eldest son of John McGuire and his wife Mary, née Grant (c. 1831 – 16 April 1910), who both emigrated aboard Grand Trianon in 1855, but married in Clare, South Australia on 27 November 1855. (Note: It is likely Mary was John's second wife, his first wife Sarah having died earlier that year, leaving a young daughter (later Mrs M. Johnson)) James was born eight months later. His father could boast of descent from an old Omagh, County Tyrone, family, and his mother was the daughter of a Royal Navy officer from County Down who "served with distinction throughout the Napoleonic Wars, and was on the Victory at Trafalgar."

McGuire began his working life with the South Australian Railways on 15 February 1870 at Port Adelaide, and in 1876 appointed station master at Crystal Brook, when the line ran only between Crystal Brook and Port Pirie. In 1877 he was promoted to Port Pirie, under the Superintendent of the Northern Division, Henry McArthur. In 1888 he was appointed Traffic Superintendent of the South-Eastern Division, the move to Kingston SE coinciding with the birth of their third son, Grant Augustine. The following year he was in the North again, as Superintendent of the Western Division in Petersburg, in charge of the northern system, which mostly consisted of the Broken Hill–Port Pirie line, arguably the most difficult section of railway in Australia to organise; keeping water supplies available to the steam locomotives in that dry and barren country being a constant challenge.

In 1910, in the shakeup following McArthur's retirement, McGuire was promoted to Superintendent of Station Services in Adelaide, in charge of all broad gauge lines a position he held until 1915, when he succeeded J. B. McNeill as General Traffic Manager.

During The Great War five of McGuire's sons volunteered for active service. Two were at the landing at Gallipoli landing, R. F. McGuire, being one of the early casualties. S. G. McGuire was killed at The Somme in 1916, and J. E. McGuire fell in 1918. E. J. McGuire was wounded twice but survived the War. A. G. McGuire volunteered, but remained in Australia. McGuire was promoted to Railways Commissioner in 1916, having worked under all his predecessors in the State: the Board of Commissioners (J. H. Smith, A. S. Neill, and John Hill 1888–1895), Alan G. Pendleton 1895–1909, and lastly Alexander Bain Moncrieff, whom he succeeded.

From 1917 to 1920 he was Chairman of the Australasian Railways Commissioners' Conference. He was appointed colonel in the Australian Staff Corps in 1917, a rank he held until his death, being largely responsible for developing national military transportation.

McGuire was in charge of railway movements of the Prince of Wales and his entourage during the Royal Visit of July 1920.

During the years McGuire was sole commissioner he had much to contend with: the great drought, the disruption and great price rises occasioned by the war. There were two coal shortages through shipping strikes, and he had to bring in the coal by train, a problem without precedent in the State.

His workload was lightened by the appointment of an American, William Alfred Webb as Chief Railways Commissioner as his superior in 1922. Though in poor health, McGuire retained his office until his death, a month before he was due to retire.

His death was marked with expressions of regret from all quarters from the Premier (R. L. Butler) down, including W. A. Webb, the Chief Railways Commissioner, who significantly honored McGuire for his courtesy and helpfulness when he had been brought in, an outsider with no knowledge of the working of the local railway system, as his superior. Another man might not have been so cooperative.

McGuire left a widow and four sons: J. P. O. McGuire, of the Outer Harbor, A. G. McGuire, and E. J. McGuire, of North Adelaide, and D. M. P. McGuire, of Largs Bay.

His remains were buried at the Cheltenham Cemetery.

== Personal ==
McGuire was a devoted Roman Catholic, which fact was occasionally used against him, but there was no denying his loyalty to the State and the British Empire, as witness his personal losses in the Great War. A landmark legal case, Cilento v. the Railway Commissioners found no cause to criticise him.

== Family ==
McGuire married Mary O'Sullivan (c. 1857 – 4 May 1942) of the Education Department on 15 August 1882. Their children include:

- John Patrick O'Sullivan McGuire (1883–1959) married Elsie Maud Powlesland on 20 September 1911. He was stationmaster at Outer Harbor.
- Francis Xavier Reginald McGuire (21 December 1884 – 29 April 1915), died of wounds at Gallipoli
- Mary Gladys (Note: Not Genevieve; she was registered at both birth and death as Mary Gladys.) McGuire (1886 – 11 September 1921) married Daniel John Patrick Slattery on 15 June 1916, lived at Kapunda, and died ten months after the birth of a daughter in December 1920.
- Augustine Grant McGuire (23 May 1888 – ) married Daisy Eugenie Turner on 5 September 1912, but gave his next-of-kin as Barbara McGuire when he enlisted for service at Darlinghurst. He was rejected for military service, perhaps on account of his employment in a reserved occupation; both before and after WWI he was with the NSW railways. Unlike his siblings his name was never mentioned in the (Catholic) Southern Cross.
- James Aloysius Collins McGuire (1890 – 1 September 1921) married Margaret Fitzsimmons
- Julian Edmund Tennison McGuire (29 March 1892 – 26 August 1918) killed in France.
- Stanislaus Geoffrey Sheridan McGuire (22 October 1893 – 19~21 August 1916), killed at The Somme
- Eugene Justin (Note: Not Joseph; he was registered as "Eugene Justin McGuire" at birth, when daughter Annie was born in 1921 and at his death.) McGuire (11 April 1896 – 1959)
- (Dominic Mary) Paul McGuire CBE (3 April 1903 – 15 June 1978), author, public servant and diplomat.

They had a home on Jetty road, Largs Bay.
