= Victor Harbor railway line =

Heritage railway line in South Australia

Victor Harbor line
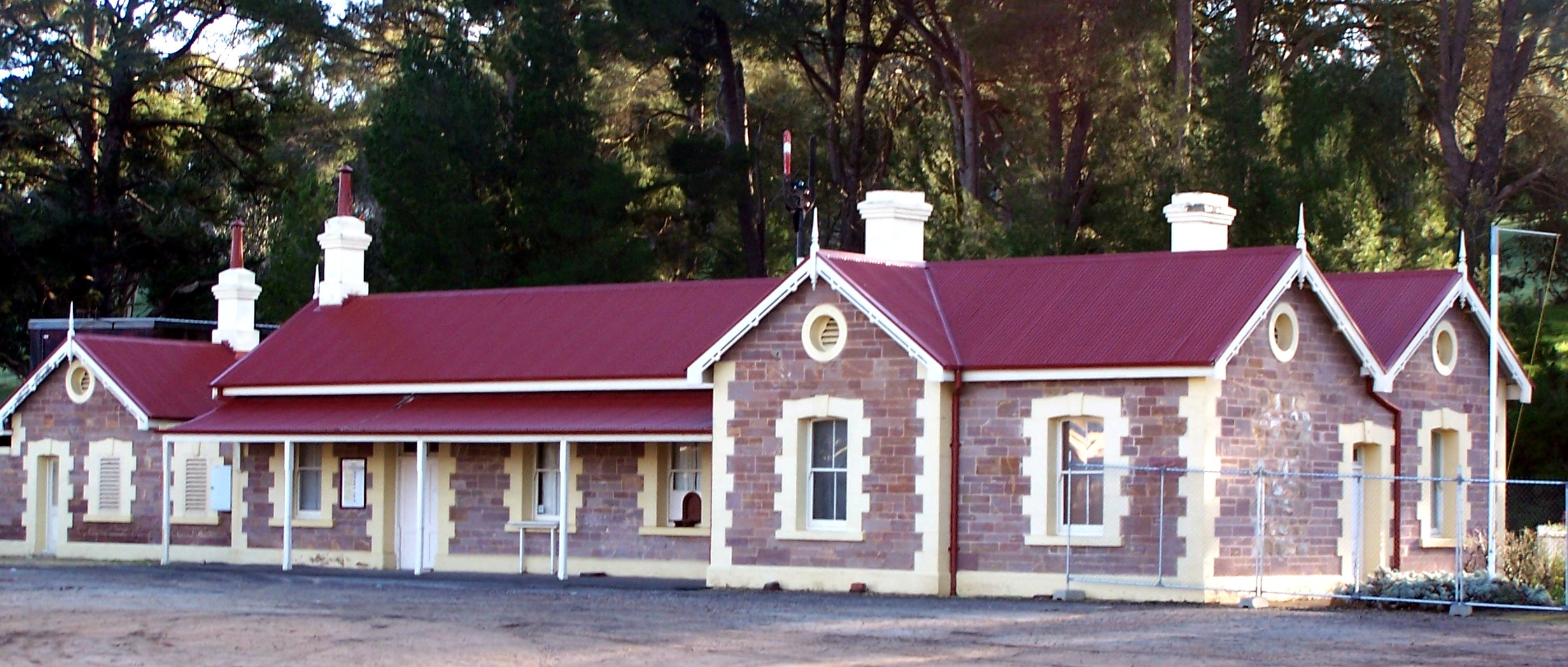
- Mount Barker station

Overview
- Status: Working heritage railway
- Termini: Mount Barker Junction; Victor Harbor
- Continues from: Adelaide-Wolseley line

Service
- Operator(s): Steamranger Heritage Railway

Technical
- Track gauge: 1,600 mm (5 ft 3 in)

The Victor Harbor railway line is a 1600 mm (5 ft 3 in) broad gauge line in South Australia. It originally branched from the Adelaide to Melbourne line at Mount Barker Junction then ran 80.6 kilometres (50 miles) south to Victor Harbor. When the mainline was converted to 1435 mm (4 ft 8 1/2 in) standard gauge and the junction was closed, the northern end of the Victor Harbor line was curtailed at Mount Barker, 3 kilometres (2 miles) from the junction.

== History ==
South Australia's first railway venture was the 11-kilometre (6.8-mile) line, completed in 1854, from Goolwa, on the River Murray, to the small ocean harbour at Port Elliot. Short trains pulled by horses moved freight and passengers between the shallow-draft River Murray paddle steamers and coastal and ocean-going vessels, bypassing the narrow, shallow mouth of the river, with its unpredictable currents. However, Port Elliot was extremely hazardous, and seven vessels had sunk there by 1864. So the line was extended 7 km (4.3 mi) to a safer anchorage at Victor Harbor. The Institution of Engineers Australia placed a Historic Engineering Marker on the railway in 1992.

The line was extended northwards to Strathalbyn in 1869. In 1884, the line from Adelaide reached Strathalbyn, allowing through travel to the capital. Until 1884, trains south of Strathalbyn were hauled by horse power but, between 1883 and 1885, the section to Currency Creek was rebuilt to steam railway standards.

Australian National operated freight services between the Strathalbyn and Victor section of the line were withdrawn in 1980 and along the rest of the line from October 1987. In July 1982, AN recommended closure of the Strathalbyn-Victor Harbor section to the Commonwealth Minister of Transport, and suspended passenger services from Adelaide to Victor Harbor on 30 April 1984.

In the early 1980s, Australian National announced that the Victor Harbor line would close, despite a good deal of public opposition. Several factors were given for the closure of the line, such as a deteriorating track condition, a long, time-consuming route compared with a more direct road journey, and declining passenger numbers: more than 50,000 return journeys were made during the 12 months to June 1978, but the number had dropped to about 16,000 in 1982–83. The last Australian National passenger service ran on 30 April 1984. The last goods train to Victor Harbor ran on 23 April 1980, hauled by locomotive 843

== Renewal ==
The SteamRanger Heritage Railway was established in 1986 to operate tourist trains on the line. In late 1989, Australian National declared the Mount Barker Junction–Strathalbyn section unsafe due to poor track condition and SteamRanger operated services from Adelaide to Strathalbyn were cancelled. That section was eventually renewed with assistance from AN during 1990–91 with funding from the State Government.

First the line beyond Strathalbyn towards Victor Harbor was operated by SteamRanger train crews, later extending to the entire line. In 1995 gauge conversion of the Adelaide to Wolseley line isolated the broad gauge Victor Harbor line off from the rest of the network, and volunteers took full responsibility for maintaining the track from Mount Barker Junction to Victor Harbor. The Junction Jogger service from Mount Barker Station to Mount Barker Junction operated until it was deemed unsafe and this section of the line closed in 2007.
