= Melbourne–Adelaide rail corridor =

Melbourne–Adelaide, Australia railway and associated lines

Coordinates: 36°22′26″S 140°57′54″E

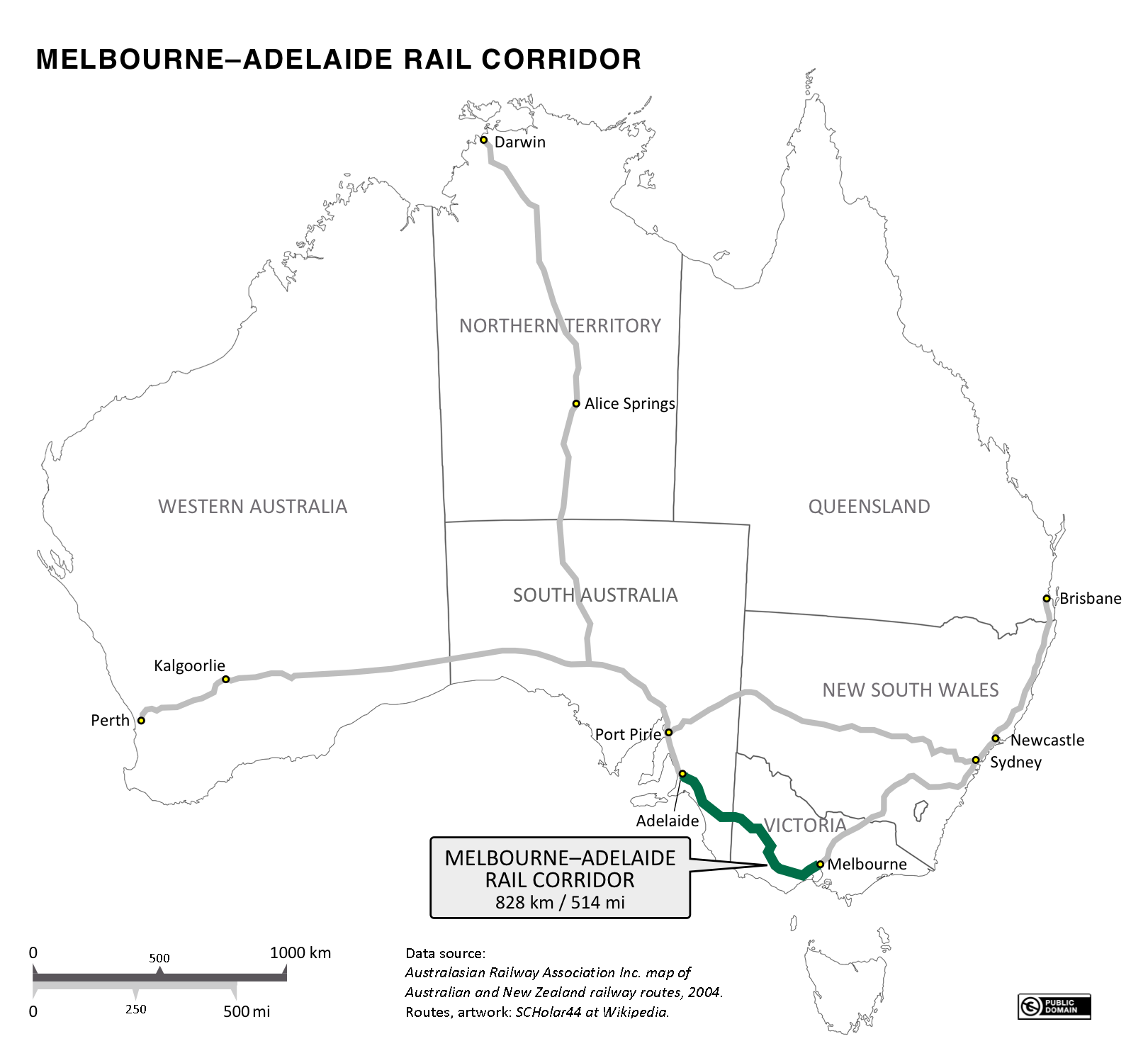
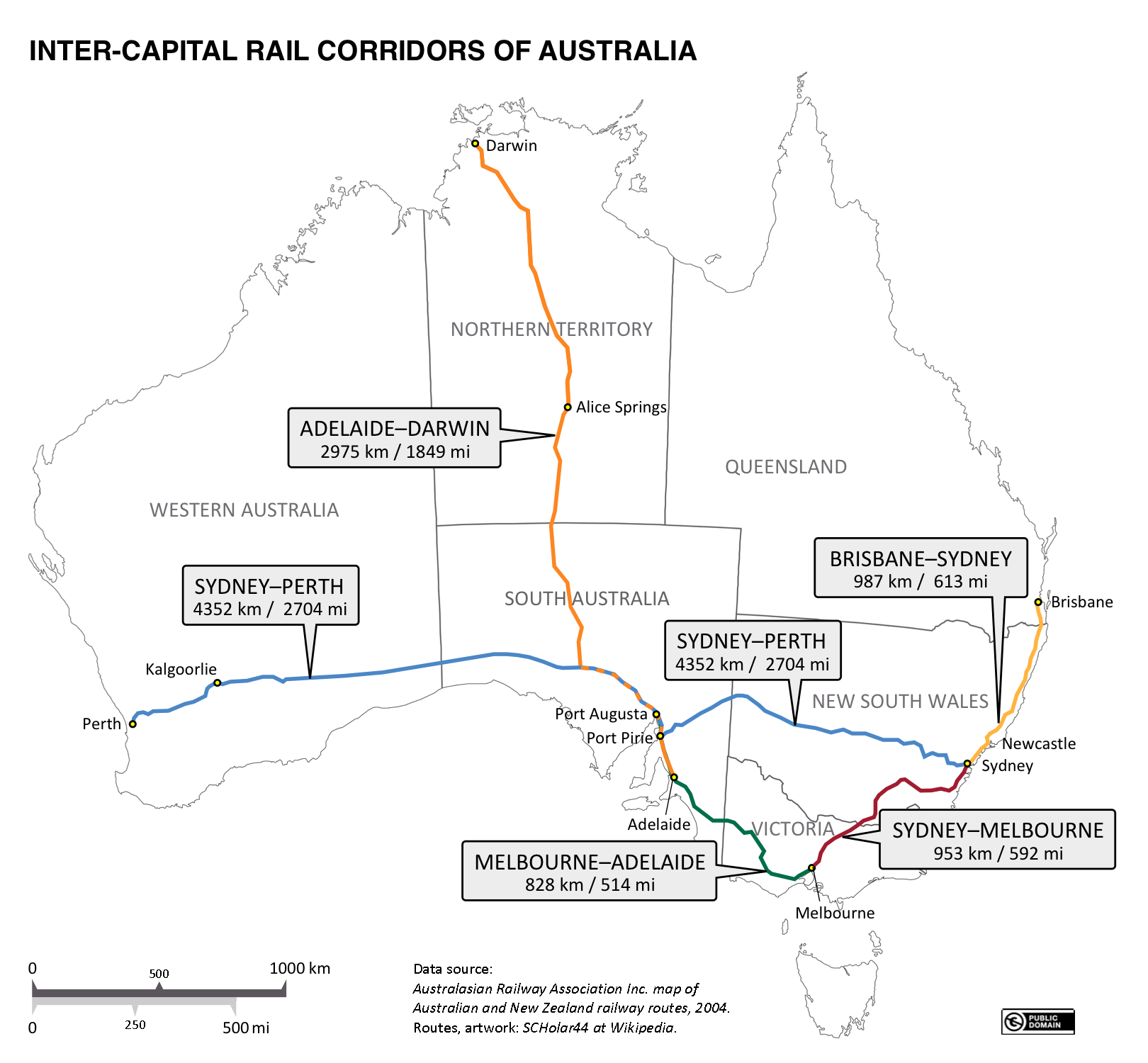

Melbourne–Adelaide rail corridor
Overview
- Locale: Victoria and South Australia
- Predecessor: Victorian Railways and South Australian Railways

Technical
- Track gauge: 1435 mm (4 ft 8 1/2 in) standard gauge since 1995
- Previous gauge: 1600 mm (5 ft 3 in) from 1887 to 1995

The Melbourne–Adelaide rail corridor consists of the 828-kilometre (514-mile) long 1435 mm (4 ft 8 1/2 in) standard-gauge main line between the Australian state capitals of Melbourne, Victoria and Adelaide, South Australia, and the lines immediately connected to it. Most of its traffic is freight; the only passenger train along the entire route is the twice-weekly passenger service The Overland, operated by Journey Beyond.

== History ==
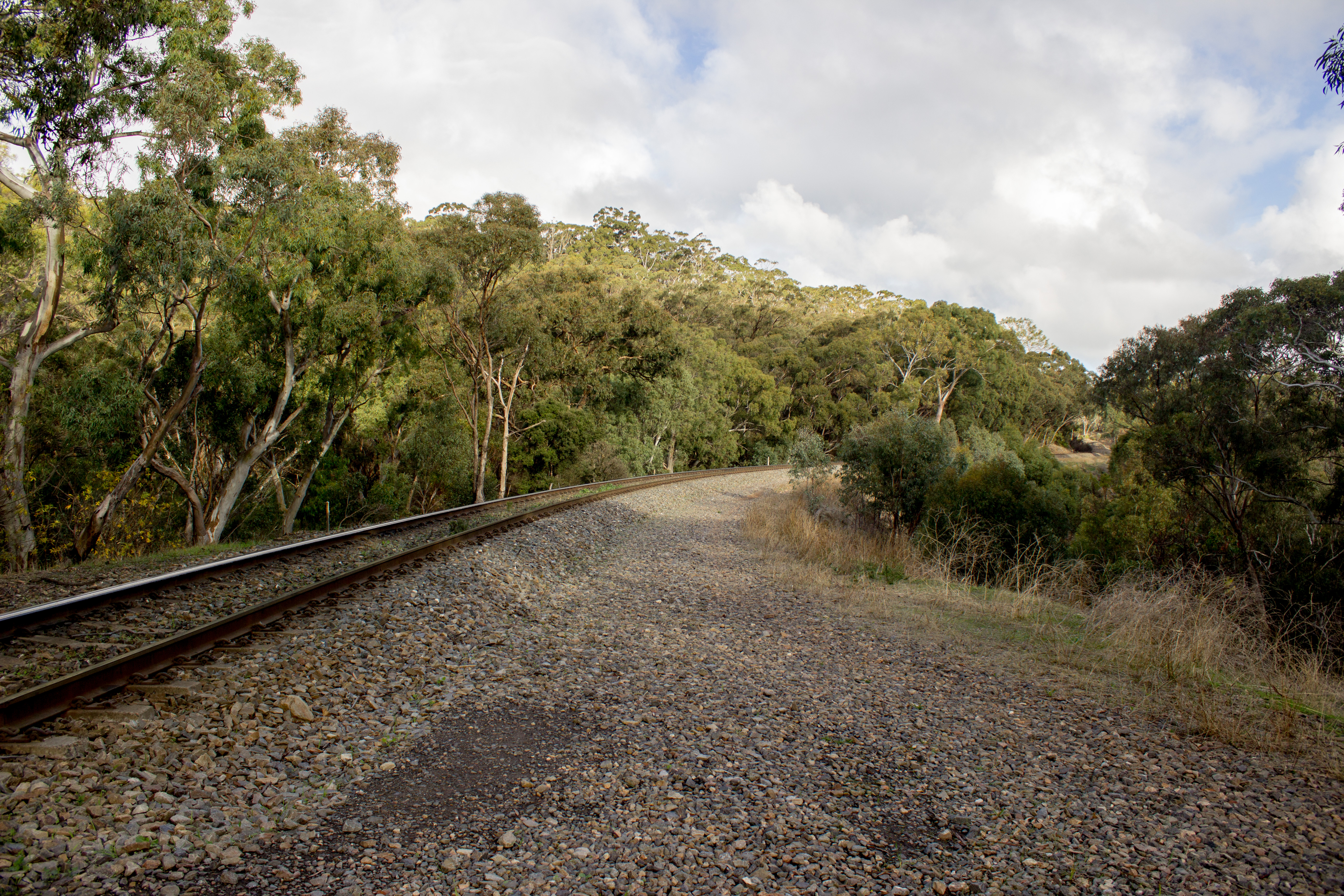
Melbourne–Adelaide railway near Sheoak Road in Belair National Park, Adelaide Hills, South Australia

From the 1850s, the Victorian Railways and South Australian Railways 1600 mm (5 ft 3 in) broad-gauge networks were established and expanded. The South Australian main line – the Adelaide-Wolseley line – was connected to the Victorian system at Serviceton in 1887. This was the first single-gauge link between two Australian colonies ; other connections were only constructed after another 50 years because of the failure of the colonies (later, states) to agree on a uniform gauge.

== Conversion to standard gauge and rerouting ==
In 1983, studies by the Victorian Railways and Australian National Railways Commission indicated that about $400 million would be required to construct a standard-gauge link between Melbourne and Adelaide. Various routes were considered, including via Pinnaroo, Ouyen and Maryborough, and the existing route via Ballarat, Ararat, Horsham, Bordertown and Murray Bridge. The route eventually chosen avoided the steep grades of the Ballarat line by going via North Shore (near North Geelong) and Cressy, joining the old route at Ararat to continue to Adelaide. The line was converted to standard gauge in 1995 under a federal infrastructure program.

== Track and gauge ==
The line is single track for the entire route with the exception of a short dual-gauge section near Melbourne and a number of 1500–1600 metres (4900–5200 feet) passing loops every 15–45 kilometres (9.3–28.0 miles). Some branch lines were also converted to standard gauge.

== Sources ==
- Avery, Rod (2006). Freight Across the Nation: The Australian Superfreighter Experience. Brisbane: Copyright Publishing Co. ISBN 1876344474.
