= William Alfred Webb =

American railroad executive (1878–1936)

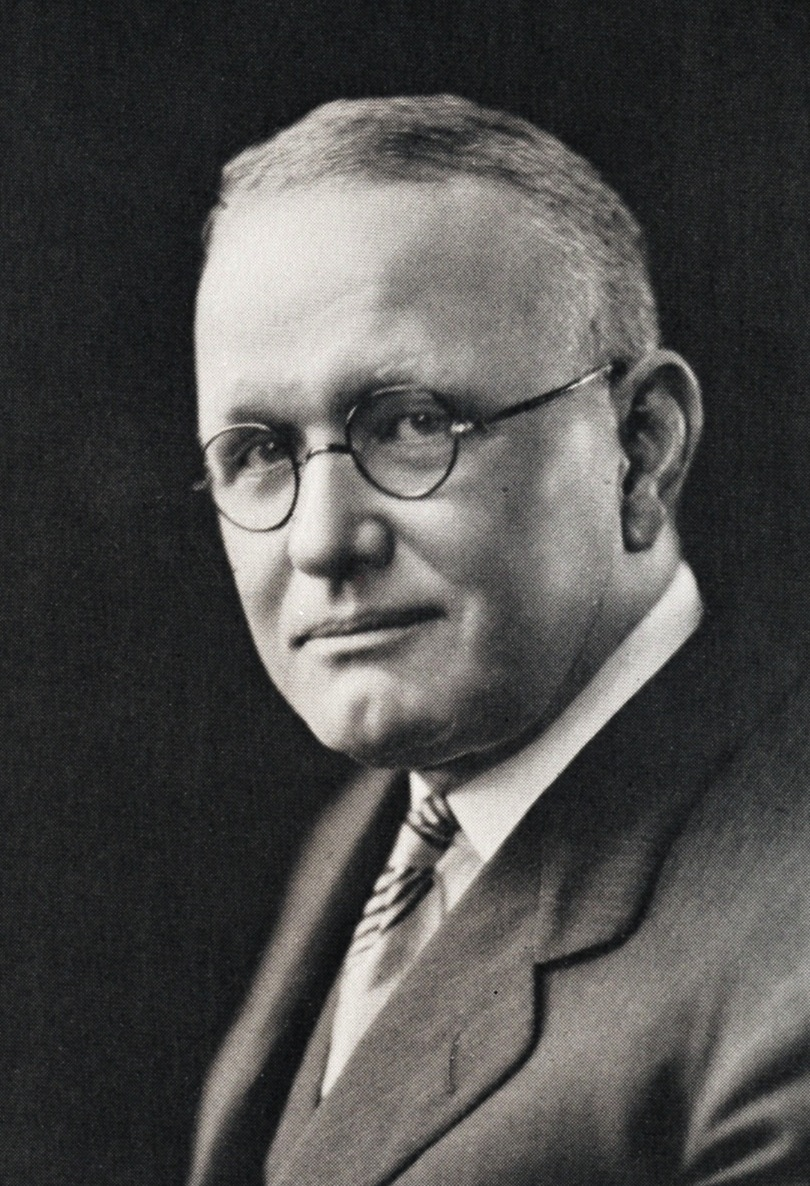
- Born: 16 May 1878; Eaton, Ohio, United States of America
- Died: 9 August 1936 (aged 58); Dallas, Texas, United States of America
- Known for: Railroad administration, in particular, revolutionising the South Australian Railways in the 1920s

William Alfred Webb (1878–1936) was an American railroad executive who had wide experience with US railroads, including the management of nationwide railroad operations during World War I, before serving as Commissioner of the South Australian Railways from 1922 to 1930. In that role, he undertook a significant rehabilitation program, transforming the inefficient and technologically backward state railway system into one with a pre-eminent position among Australian railways.

After returning to the US, he achieved elected office in Dallas before leading the preparations for the 1936 Texas Centennial Exposition. He died in office two months after the exposition opened.

== Early career ==
At the age of 12, Webb began as a messenger boy on the Colorado Midland Railway. He rose from traffic clerk to telegraphist, studied shorthand at night school, and became stenographer to the general manager. Appointed secretary to the president of the Colorado and Southern Railway in 1900, Webb was assistant to its vice-president by 1911. He became general manager of the Texas Central Railroad and in 1914 general manager, operations, of the Missouri–Kansas–Texas Railroad. When the United States entered World War I in 1917, he was called by the United States Railroad Administration to Washington. His wide experience in the private American railroads had given him a practical grounding in every aspect of rail management.

Webb resigned from the United States Railroad Administration in 1920 to become vice-president and general manager of the St. Louis Southwestern Railway until May 1921. That was then followed by a brief period in 1922 as the elected president of the Cambria and Indiana Railroad, which he left due to tensions with the new owner of the railroad.

== South Australia ==
Webb was one of dozens of candidates who responded to an international call by the South Australian government in the early 1920s for a Commissioner to manage the government-owned South Australian Railways. By that time, the railways had decayed to the point of imminent collapse. In 1922, when he started his appointment in Adelaide, Webb considered that by applying business operating principles he would be able to get the South Australian Railways on a footing where they would give a minimum return of 6 per cent on the investment. He did not foresee however, the impacts of the Great Depression and the growth of ownership of motor cars, nor was he fully aware of the millstone of the hundreds of miles of developmental lines, with their unpredictable seasonal agricultural traffic.

Webb concentrated on reducing gross ton miles, and augmented net ton miles by increasing full carload lots. He introduced large freight cars and locomotives, heavier track, stronger bridges and efficient practices. His most important changes to working methods occurred in 1924–26: the train control organisation was introduced in 1924, high-capacity bogie freight cars in 1925, and large-power locomotives in 1926. Webb's dramatic railway rehabilitation left few aspects untouched by technological change and innovation. He rehabilitated the South Australian Railways so thoroughly that, for twenty-five years, they were a paragon among Australian railways.

While in Adelaide, he lived in the prestigious Ruthven Mansions in Pulteney Street, in the city centre.

=== Legacy ===
Webb was noted for his abilities to enthuse his staff, particularly his senior officers, so that the whole system was imbued with the spirit to serve, to persevere and to deliver the goods. People responded to him and he put his absolute trust in them, being rarely let down. His attitudes were underpinned by respect for people's dignity, as he revealed in a bulletin about service to the public soon after he took up his post. He was also noted for his extraordinary work ethic. Webb's expertise was recognised elsewhere in Australia. In 1924, for example, he spent two weeks in Tasmania advising the Tasmanian Government on its railway problems. He resigned in 1929, to be replaced by Charles Buxton Anderson.

After Webb's departure in May 1930, his administrative reforms were dismantled and the old hierarchy was reinstated, although the South Australian Railways were in a better position than most to meet the huge logistical demands of World War II. However, despite notable post-war innovations in freight and passenger rolling stock, and locomotive and railcar engineering, the South Australian Railways underwent a slow decline because the state government (as with other state administrations) was unwilling to evolve a rational transportation policy and implement it within the boundaries of the state's fiscal capacity.

In 1973, the South Australian Government took up an offer by the newly elected Whitlam government to hand over its railway system to federal control, and implemented the transfer two years later. (Note: Only the country lines were handed to Australian National. Adelaide's metropolitan passenger lines were vested in the newly formed State Transport Authority.)

Webb's most lasting legacy in Adelaide is Adelaide railway station, its design combining neoclassical architecture with that of union stations in the United States. (Note: The South Australian Government announced plans for a renewal program in March 2020.)

== Later career ==
On returning to Dallas, Webb, by then very well off financially, served as a member of the city council and did a lot of work for charities. In 1935, he became the purchasing agent, then general manager, preparing for the 1936 Texas Centennial Exposition. He worked up to 18 hours a day, seven days a week in the job, and his health deteriorated badly.

== Death ==
He died of an intracranial haemorrhage on 9 August 1936, two months after the exposition opened. He had been approached to become manager of the 1939 New York World's Fair. His death was widely mourned in Dallas and he received a state funeral.

== See also ==
- Alexander Bain Moncrieff
- James McGuire (railways)

== Biography ==
- National Library of Australia. Biographical cuttings on William Alfred Webb, public servant, brought to S.A. by Barwell Government in 1922, containing one or more cuttings from newspapers or journals. Early 20C to 2000. NLA
- Jennings, Reece Ian (1973), W.A. Webb, South Australian Railways Commissioner, 1922-1930 : a political, economic and social biography (2nd ed.), Nesfield Press, ISBN 978-0-9599230-0-1
- Jennings, Reece (2006). "Webb, William Alfred (1878–1936)". Australian Dictionary of Biography. Vol. 12. National Centre of Biography, Australian National University. ISBN 978-0-522-84459-7. ISSN 1833-7538. OCLC 70677943.
