= One Nation (infrastructure) =

Australian infrastructure development program

One Nation was an Australian Government program of infrastructure development carried out under the Keating Government from 1991 to 1996. Much of the program was implemented as a means of stimulating the economy in the aftermath of the early 1990s recession.

== Elements ==
Key elements of the One Nation program included:

- the Melbourne–Adelaide railway line was converted to standard gauge in 1995.
- the 1067mm gauge Fisherman Islands railway line to the Port of Brisbane was converted to dual 1435/1067 mm gauge and extended in parallel with the duplicated passenger line to Dutton Park in 1997.
- a standard gauge link was built to the port at Fremantle, Western Australia.
- new standard gauge sidings were provided at Adelaide Outer Harbor.
- a separate freight line was built between Macarthur and Glenfield as the first stage of what is now known as the Southern Sydney Freight Line. Its planned extension to the Chullora – Enfield freight line near Sefton was completed in 2013 by the Australian Rail Track Corporation with funds provided by the Australian Government under AusLink.
- the Sydney–Brisbane railway line was upgraded with longer passing loops, the replacement of wooden trestles with concrete bridges, concrete resleepering, some minor deviations and bank stabilisation.
- passing loops were extended on the North East railway line between Wodonga and Melbourne.
- overhead clearances on the Adelaide–Perth railway were increased to allow for the transit of double-stacked containers.

== See also ==
- AusLink
