= Z-class =

Z-class may refer to:

- South Australian Railways Z class, a class of steam locomotive
- SR Z Class, a class of steam locomotive built by the Southern Railway in the United Kingdom
- Tasmanian Government Railways Z class, a class of diesel locomotive built by English Electric in Australia
- Victorian Railways Z class, a class of steam locomotive built in Victoria, Australia
- WAGR Z class, a class of diesel-mechanical locomotives of the Western Australian Government Railways
- W and Z-class destroyer, a class of destroyers of the Royal Navy launched in 1943–1944
- Z-Class Melbourne Tram, a single bogie electric tram used in Australia
- Z-class torpedo boat, a class of warships originating from the Royal Netherlands Navy
- Zeddie, or Z Class, New Zealand sailing dinghy
