= South Australian Railways =

Former railways agency in South Australia

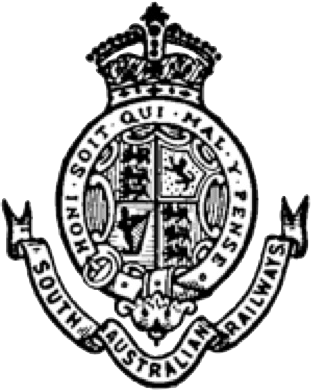
- Industry: Railway owner, operator and manufacturer
- Founded: 1854
- Defunct: 28 February 1978
- Fate: Sold to the Australian federal government
- Successor: Australian National Railways Commission, trading as Australian National
- Headquarters: Adelaide, Australia
- Area served: South Australia
- Parent: Government of South Australia

South Australian Railways (SAR) was the organisation through which the Government of South Australia built and operated railways in South Australia from 1854 until March 1978, when its non-urban railways were incorporated into Australian National, and its Adelaide urban lines were transferred to the State Transport Authority.

The SAR's tracks were built to three rail gauges: 1600 mm (5 ft 3 in) broad gauge; 1067 mm (3 ft 6 in) narrow gauge; and from the 1980s, when gauge standardisation at last commenced, 1435 mm (4 ft 8 1/2 in) standard gauge.

== History ==
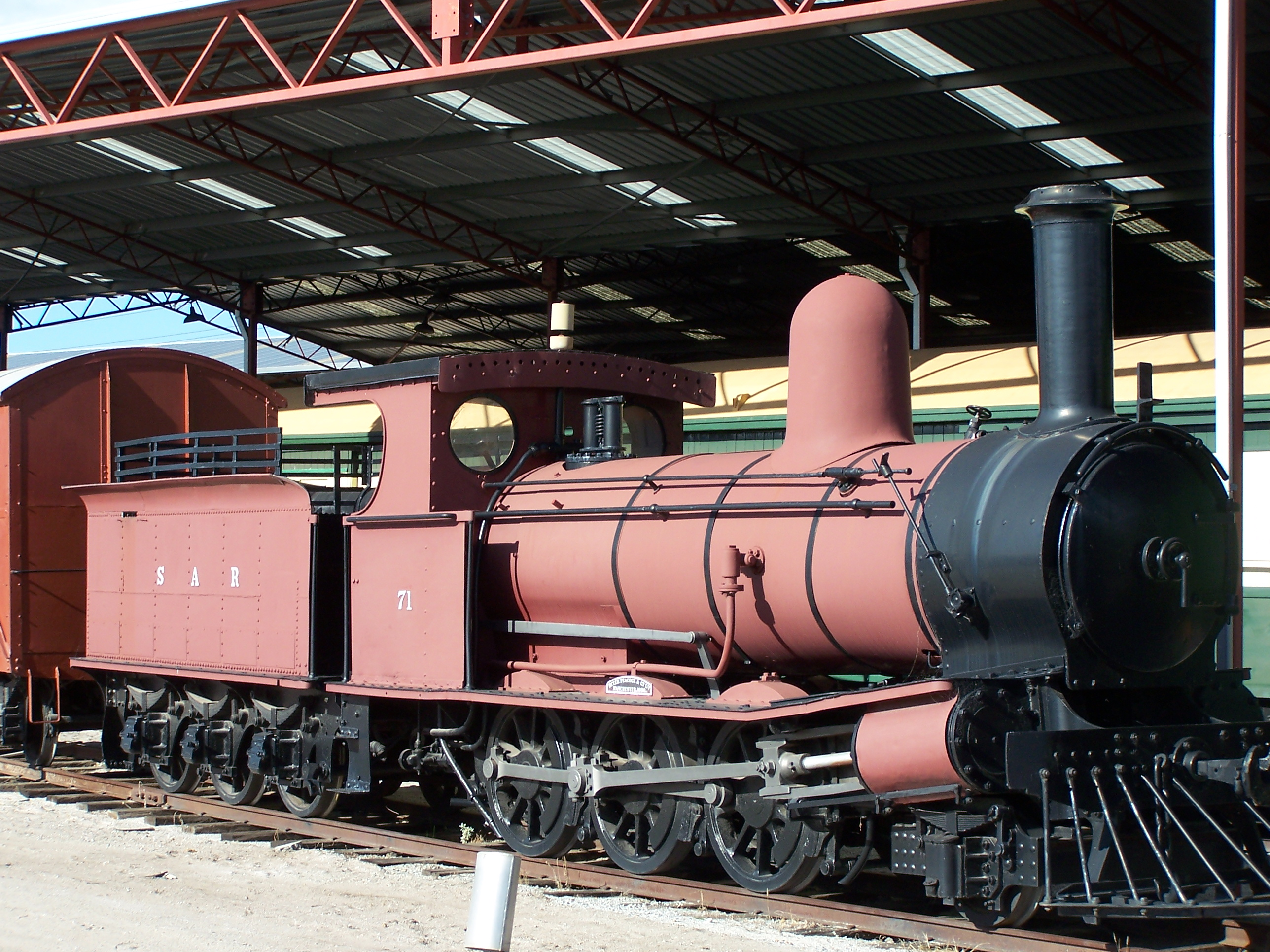
Y71 steam locomotive on display at the Western Australian Rail Transport Museum

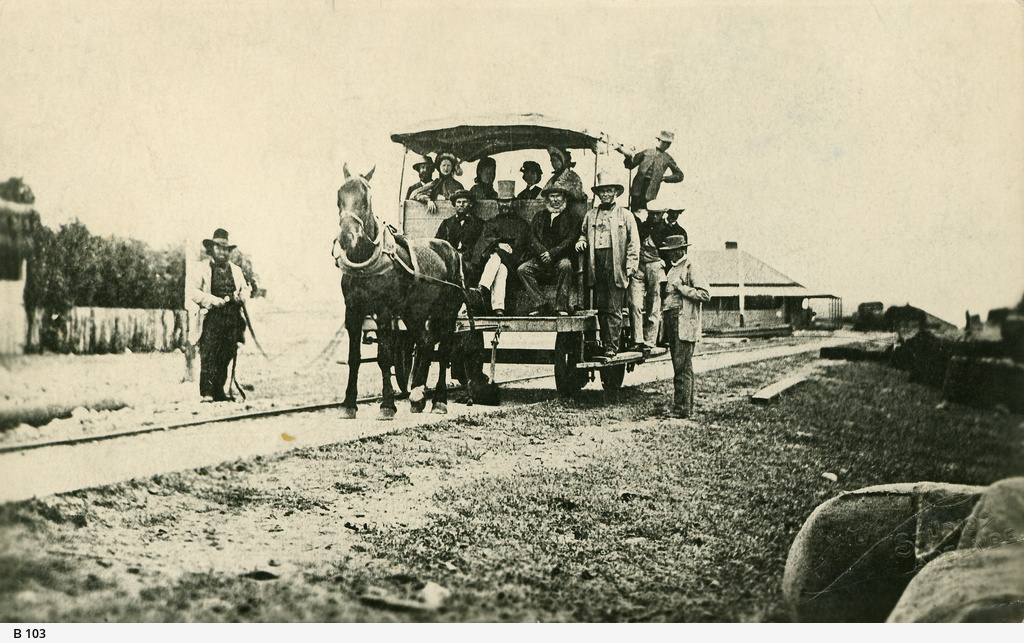
The horsedrawn Goolwa to Port Elliot railway, in 1860

=== Colonial period ===
The first railway in South Australia was laid in 1854 between Goolwa and Port Elliot to allow for goods to be transferred between paddle steamers on the Murray River and seagoing vessels. The Goolwa station was built on the Wharf precinct, alongside the River Murray.

The next railway was laid from the harbour at Port Adelaide, to the capital, Adelaide, and was laid with Irish gauge 5 ft 3 in (1,600 mm) track. This line was opened in 1856. Later on, branch lines in the state's north in the mining towns of Kapunda and Burra were linked through to the Adelaide metropolitan system. From here, a south main line extended to meet the horse tramway from Victor Harbor to Strathalbyn, and towards the South Australia/Victoria Border.

The metropolitan lines were built to broad gauge, but the mid north and south-east of the state were laid with 1067 mm (3 ft 6 in) narrow-gauge track. These systems were closely based on British practice, as was the broad gauge system prior to 1926. Locomotives and rolling stock were bought from the United Kingdom and United States, from builders such as Beyer, Peacock & Company, Dübs and Company, North British Locomotive Company, and Baldwin Locomotive Works.

=== Rehabilitation ===
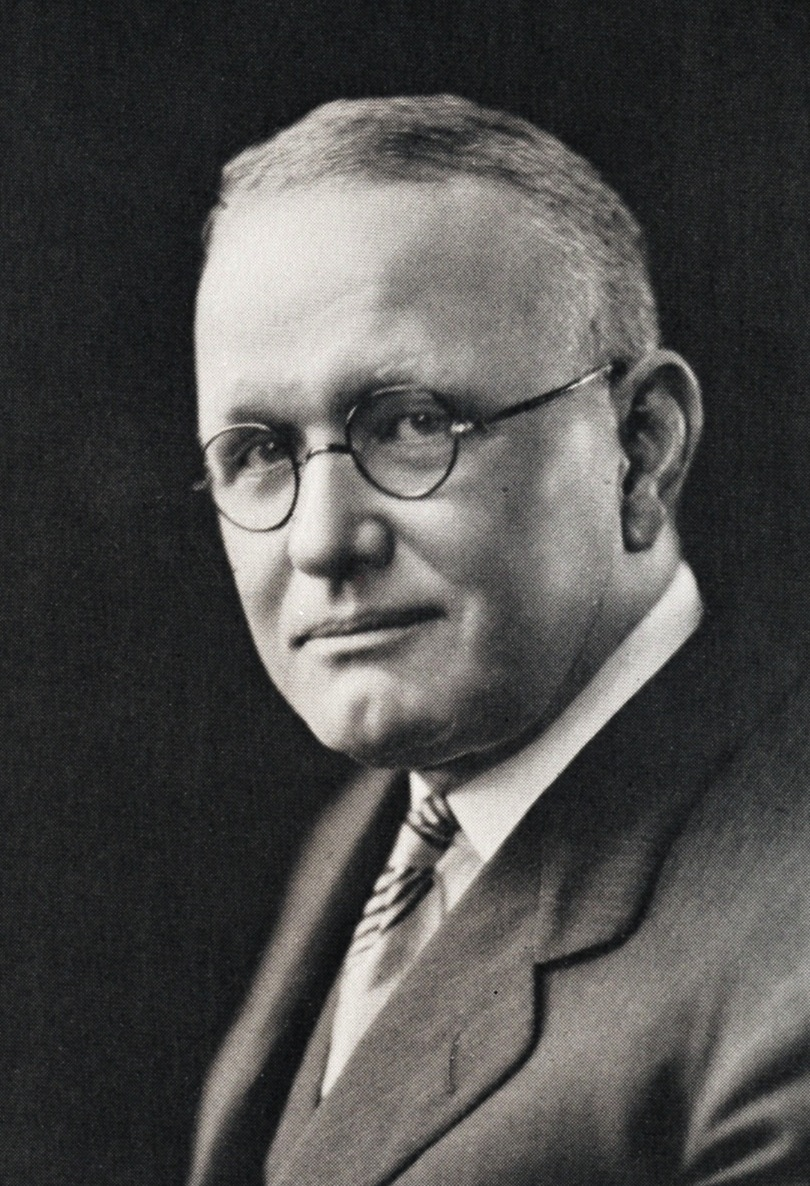
William Webb, who transformed South Australian Railways in the 1920s

In 1922, after the SAR's worst financial deficit, the government appointed American railroad manager William Webb, from the Missouri-Kansas-Texas Railroad as Chief Commissioner. When Webb arrived in Adelaide with his young family, he found a railway system unchanged since the latter decades of the 19th century. The locomotives and rolling stock were small, wagons and carriages were of wooden construction, the track and bridges were unsuitable for heavy loads, the workshops had antiquated machinery and the signalling system was inflexible. These attributes drove up the ratio of operating costs to revenue.

Webb introduced a rehabilitation plan based on American railroad principles of large, standardised locomotives and steel-bodied freight cars, with automatic "knuckle" couplers (replacing hook-and-chain) to enable a significant increase in productivity. Lightly patronised passenger trains were replaced by self-propelled railcars, enabling faster, more frequent and more efficient services. He recruited young engineer Fred Shea as his chief mechanical engineer and had him prepare specifications for this new equipment. This resulted in orders being placed for 1200 freight cars of four types from American Car and Foundry and 30 locomotives based on American Locomotive Company designs but built by Armstrong Whitworth & Co in the United Kingdom. These were of the Mountain, Pacific and Mikado wheel arrangements, 10 of each type, which became the 500, 600, and 700 class locomotives. At the same time, 12 petrol-mechanical railcars from the Service Motors Corporation, Wabash, Indiana were ordered, to provide services more cheaply than by locomotive-hauled trains. (Note: Subsequently followed by 68 larger railcars.)

To carry the heavier trains, the rehabilitation plan included the strengthening of track and bridges, and the conversion of the Mid North narrow gauge system (the Western division) to broad gauge. The antiquated Islington Railway Workshops were demolished and replaced with a modern railway maintenance and manufacturing works; a large new roundhouse was built at Mile End, near Adelaide; and several 26 metres (85 feet) turntables were installed throughout the state to enable the much larger locomotives to be turned. Efficient train operations were facilitated by the adoption of American train order working on country lines, and Adelaide railway station was replaced with an imposing new building, opened in 1927. This grand building has been partially taken over by the Adelaide Casino.

A 500 class locomotive introduced by Webb to haul heavy trains over the Adelaide Hills

When the two shiploads of new locomotives arrived in 1926 they caused a sensation with the public and throughout the railway industry in Australia. The 500 class "Mountain" was more than twice the size of the biggest pre-Webb engine, and was for a time the most powerful locomotive in Australia. Henceforth, double heading broad-gauge trains became a rarity in South Australia. The massive locomotives were unloaded at Port Adelaide and taken off the pier by horses (the locomotives' weight alone exceeded the dock's maximum loading capacity). Apart from some initial teething problems, the new locomotives settled in well to their assigned roles. After the success of the original locomotives, ten more 700 class locomotives, with larger tenders, were built using the facilities of the new Islington Workshops. They were the 710 class.

The 500 class was rated to haul 410 tonnes (400 long tons; 450 short tons) over the Mount Lofty Ranges immediately east of Adelaide, where a 31 kilometres (19 miles) continuous 1-in-45 (2.2%) gradient faced trains heading for Victoria. Two years after their introduction, the class was modified by the addition of a booster engine which required replacement of the two-wheel trailing truck with a four-wheel truck. This altered the wheel arrangement from 4-8-2 "Mountains" to 4-8-4 "Northerns", but the public had been imbued with the old term and it stuck. Reclassified as the 500B class, their maximum load to Mount Lofty was increased to 600 tonnes (590 long tons; 660 short tons) or eleven passenger cars. In the pre-Webb era the most powerful locomotive, the 4-6-0 Rx class, was rated at 190 tons for this line, and three of them were needed to lift the heavy Melbourne Express, two at the front and one banking from the rear.

The broad-gauge system was the main focus of Webb's rehabilitation scheme. The narrow gauge systems north of Terowie and on the Eyre Peninsula remained untouched, as did the narrow-gauge South Eastern division (although it was subsequently converted to broad gauge in the early 1950s).

Webb decided not to extend his contract in 1930 and returned to the US, having revolutionised the SAR.

=== Post-Depression period ===
In 1936, the SAR owned 365 locomotives, 51 railcars, 408 passenger carriages, 38 brake vans and 8,219 goods wagons. The following year, ten 620 class 4-6-2 Pacific type locomotives, designed and built at the SAR's Islington Works – were introduced. Their axle load enabled them to traverse the many rural lines laid with 60-pound rail, but they were also usefully deployed on the East-West Express between Adelaide and Port Pirie following the extension of the broad gauge line north from Redhill to Port Pirie in 1937.

Other additions to the locomotive fleet after the Depression included the 2-8-4 720 class, a further development of the 700/710 class locomotives, and the 520 class, a 4-8-4 locomotive, externally styled after the Pennsylvania Railroad T1; it had the same light axle load as the 620 class but a 30% higher tractive effort, achieving higher speeds on all mainline passenger services.

In 1949, the diesel era started, tentatively, with two Bo-Bo 350 class shunting locomotives, designed and built by Islington Works and incorporating British components.

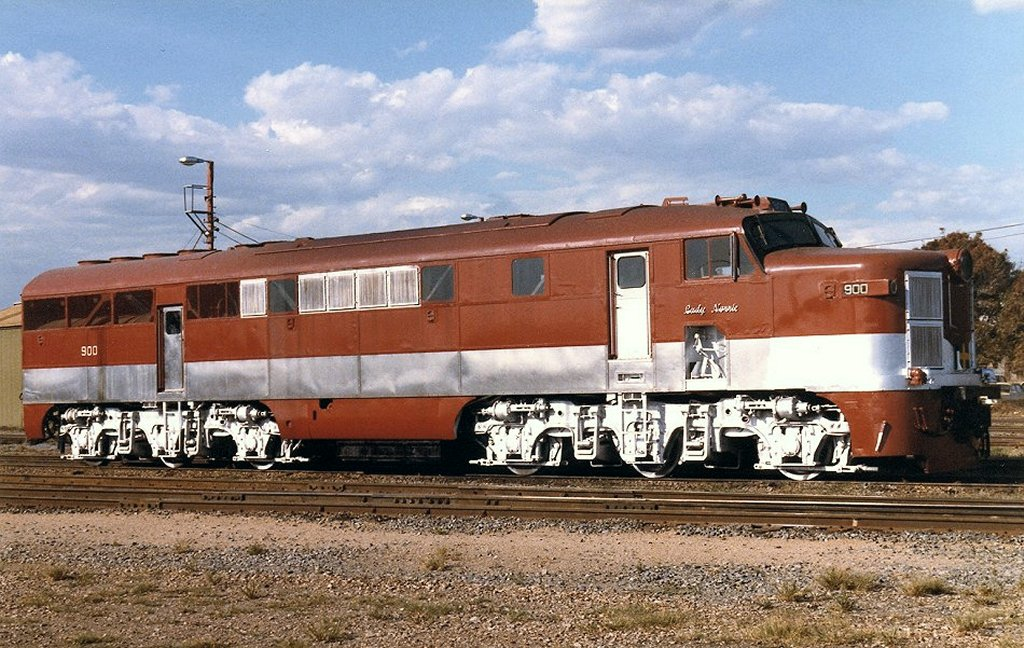
The SAR 900 class diesel-electric locomotive, built by the SAR and designed particularly for the demanding Adelaide Hills route, entered service in 1951

Two years later, the SAR's first mainline diesel-electric locomotives entered service: the 900 class, also designed and built by Islington Railway Workshops. Their styling closely followed that of the Alco PA diesels in the United States. Subsequently, and coincidentally, the SAR exclusively purchased American Locomotive Company products made under licence in Sydney by AE Goodwin: the 930, 830, 600 and 700 classes. In the 1950s, railcars were introduced: the 250 and 100 class "Bluebirds" for regional services and the 300 and 400 class "Red Hens" for Adelaide suburban services.

A major change occurred in 1970, when the remaining 400 kilometres (250 miles) length of the Sydney-Perth rail corridor that was not built to 1435 mm (4 ft 8 1/2 in) standard gauge, the Port Pirie-Broken Hill line, was gauge-converted.

In the 1972 election, the Whitlam Federal Government made a commitment to invite the states to hand over their railway systems to the federal government. The Government of South Australia took up the offer, but elected to retain the Adelaide metropolitan services, which were transferred to the State Transport Authority. Financial responsibility for the remaining services passed to the federal government on 1 July 1975, although the SAR continued services until operations were formally transferred on 1 March 1978 to the Australian National Railways Commission.

The penultimate head of the SAR, commissioner Ron Fitch, reflecting on the end of the railway administration, wrote: "The merging of the major part of the SAR into the Australian National Railways Commission, and the remainder into the South Australian State Transport Authority, cannot but tend to consign the former state railway system into eventual oblivion. But posterity should not be allowed to forget its achievements:

- The Goolwa to Port Elliot railway, the first public railway in Australia.
- The first publicly owned railway in the British Empire; that between Adelaide and Port Adelaide.
- The Darwin to Pine Creek and the Port Augusta to Oodnadatta railways, built ... as part of the grand concept of a north-south transcontinental rail link.
- Its gesture, together with the gentlemen of the Silverton Tramway Company, in providing a rail connection to Broken Hill, at a time when NSW declined to do so.
- The introduction into the Australian railways in the 1920s of large steam locomotive power.
- The installation of the nation's first train control system.
- The design and construction of what were then the world's finest sleeping cars.
- The placing into scheduled service on the mainland of Australia the first mainline diesel-electric locomotive."

== Locomotive and railcar classes ==
Broad gauge steam classes
Class	Qty	Builder	Introduced	Withdrawn	Notes
Locos 1‑3	3	Fairbairn	1856	1871–1874	Locos Adelaide, Victoria and Albert preceded class system; eventually numbered 1, 2 & 3
A	3	Stephenson	1868, 1873	1893–1924	
B	2	Stephenson	1856, 1858	1935, 1938	
C	2	Stephenson	1856, 1857	1906, 1926	
D	8	Stephenson	1856, 1862–1867	1896, 1904, 1932	
E	7	Slaughter, Grüning; Avonside	1862–1882	1886–1929	
F (1st)	2	Avonside	1869	1892	
F (2nd)	43	SAR; Martin; Perry	1902–1922	1956–1968	[NRM]
G	8	Beyer, Peacock	1869, 1880, 1886	1904–1923	
Ga	1	Stephenson	1899	1915[c]	Bought second-hand; built 1874
Gb	2	Stephenson	1899	1904, 1916[c]	Bought second-hand; built 1874, 1878
Gc	1	Stephenson	1899	1905[c]	Bought second-hand; built 1879
Gd	2	Beyer, Peacock	1899	1925[c]	Bought second-hand; built 1880
Ge	2	Beyer, Peacock	1899	1929, 1935 [c]	Bought second-hand; built 1897
H	9	Stephenson	1870–1877	1888–1930	
I (1st)	1	Neilson	1879	1909	Bought second-hand; built 1873
I (2nd)	1	Beyer, Peacock	1910	1929	Bought second-hand; built 1888
J	2	Beyer, Peacock	1875	1932, 1934	
K	13	Beyer, Peacock	1879–1884	1936–1956	
L	4	Beyer, Peacock	1880	1928, 1931	
M (1st)	5	Avonside	1880, 1881	1913–1917	Bought second-hand; built 1868–1874
M (2nd)	20	Phoenix; David Munro & Co.	1920–1922	1925–1935	Bought second-hand; built 1889–1894
N	2	Baldwin	1881	1925, 1927	
O (1st)	2	Baldwin	1881	1904	
O (2nd)	1	Stephenson	1912	1929	Bought second-hand; built 1868
P	20	Beyer, Peacock; Martin	1884, 1893	1929, 1957	[NRM]
Q	22	Dübs; Martin	1885, 1892	1923, 1956	
R & Rx	84	Dübs; Martin; SAR; North British; Walkers	1886, 1895, 1916	1927–1969	From 1899, all R class (rebuilds and new builds) became Rx class, denoting Belpaire fireboxes [NRM] [SHR]
S	18	Martin	1893, 1903–1904	1942–1960	
Tx	78	SAR; Martin; Walkers	1903–1917	1957–1961	Five narrow-gauge T class converted from narrow gauge 1929; reverted 1949.
500	10	Armstrong Whitworth	1926	1958–1963	[NRM]
520	12	SAR	1943–1947	1961–1971	[NRM] [SHR]
600	10	Armstrong Whitworth	1926	1958–1961	
620	10	SAR	1936–1938	1963–1969	[NRM] [SHR]
700	10	Armstrong Whitworth	1926	1962–1968	[NRM]
710	10	SAR	1929	1962–1968	
720	17	SAR	1930–1943	1958–1960	
740	10	Clyde Engineering	1951–1953	1963–1965	
750	10	North British	1951	1961-1969	Bought second-hand. [NRM]
Other broad-gauge locomotives purchased by the SAR but not given a classification were as follows: nos. 97 and 98: 0-6-0T locos built by Kitson in 1884; no. 154: 2-4-0T built by Stephenson in 1893, acquired from the Glenelg Railway Company in 1899; no. 155: 2-4-0T built by Dübs in 1879, acquired from the Grange Railway and Investment Company in 1893.
Notes: [c] = date condemned; date withdrawn is unknown. Codes in the Notes column show the locations of preserved examples of classes (operational or on static display) as of 2021: [NRM]: National Railway Museum, Port Adelaide; [SHR]: SteamRanger heritage railway.

Narrow gauge steam classes
Class	Qty	Builder	Introduced	Withdrawn	Notes
300	6	WAGR, VR	1952	1955–1956	Bought second-hand; built 1943–1945
400	10	Société Franco-Belge	1952–1953	1970	[NRM]
K	1	Dübs	1884	1938	
T	78	SAR, Martin, Walkers	1903–1917	?–1970	[NRM] [PRR]
U	8	Beyer, Peacock	1876	1924–1929	
V	8	Beyer, Peacock; Martin	1877, 1893	1930s, 1940s	
W & Wx	35	Beyer, Peacock	1877–1882	1929, 1959	From 1903, 18 were rebuilt as Wx class with upgraded boilers.
X	8	Baldwin	1881–1882	?–1907	
Y & Yx	129	Beyer, Peacock; SAR; Martin	1885–1898	Mainly 1960s	Between 1904 and 1924, 48 were rebuilt as Yx class with Belpaire fireboxes [NRM] [PRR]
Z	10	Martin, SAR	1895, 1911	1956	
Other narrow-gauge locomotives purchased by the SAR but not given a classification were as follows: no. 0: 2-6-2T built by Beyer, Peacock, acquired in exchange (for a V class loco, lasting 9 months) with BHP in 1892; no. 107: 0-4-0ST (nicknamed Sandfly) built in 1886 by Baldwin, acquired from C. & E. Millar Bros in 1890; no. 260: 0-4-0T built in 1911 by Hudswell, Clarke & Co. Ltd, acquired from the SA Engineer-in-Chief's Department in 1916.
Notes: Codes in the Notes column show the locations of preserved examples of classes (operational or on static display) as of 2021: [NRM]: National Railway Museum, Port Adelaide; [PRR]: Pichi Richi Railway.

Diesel (locomotive and railcar) classes
Class	Qty	Gauge	Builder	Introduced	Withdrawn	Notes
350	2	Broad	SAR	1949	1979	[MHRM] [SHR]
500	34	Broad & standard	SAR	1964–1969	Most 1990s	[NRM] [SHR]
600	7	Standard	Goodwin	1965, 1969–1970	Mainly 1990s	
700	6	Broad & standard	Goodwin	1971–1972	Mainly 2010s	
800	10	Broad	English Electric (NSW)	1956–1957	Early 1990s	[NRM]
830	45	Broad, standard & narrow	Goodwin	1959–1969	See note	Includes 7 DA conversions
900	10	Broad	SAR	1951–1953	1979–1985	[NRM]
930	37	Broad	Goodwin	1955–1967	Most 1986–1994	[NRM] [SHR]
Brill Model 55 railcars	12	Broad	Brill (Note: Ordered from the Service Motor Truck Company, Indiana, which before delivery was taken over by Brill, who built them.)	1924, 1925	1971?	[NRM]
Brill Model 75 railcars	39 power cars, 29 trailers (Note: Brill supplied 1 assembled railcar and chassis for 24 others; Islington built the remainder.)	Broad & narrow	SAR	1927	1971	[NRM] [PRR] [SHR]
100, 250 & 280 class Bluebird railcars	21	Broad & standard	SAR	1954–1959	1989–1995	See note. [NRM]
300 & 400 class "Red Hen" railcars	111	Broad	SAR	1955–1971	1996	[NRM] [SHR]
Notes: The post-SAR dispositions of diesel locomotives and railcars were very diverse and are not easily summarised. Further details are in the articles. Codes in the Notes column show the locations of preserved examples of classes (operational or on static display) as of 2021: [MHRM]: Milang Historical Railway Museum; [NRM]: National Railway Museum, Port Adelaide; [PRR]: Pichi Richi Railway; [SHR]: SteamRanger heritage railway.

== Commissioners ==
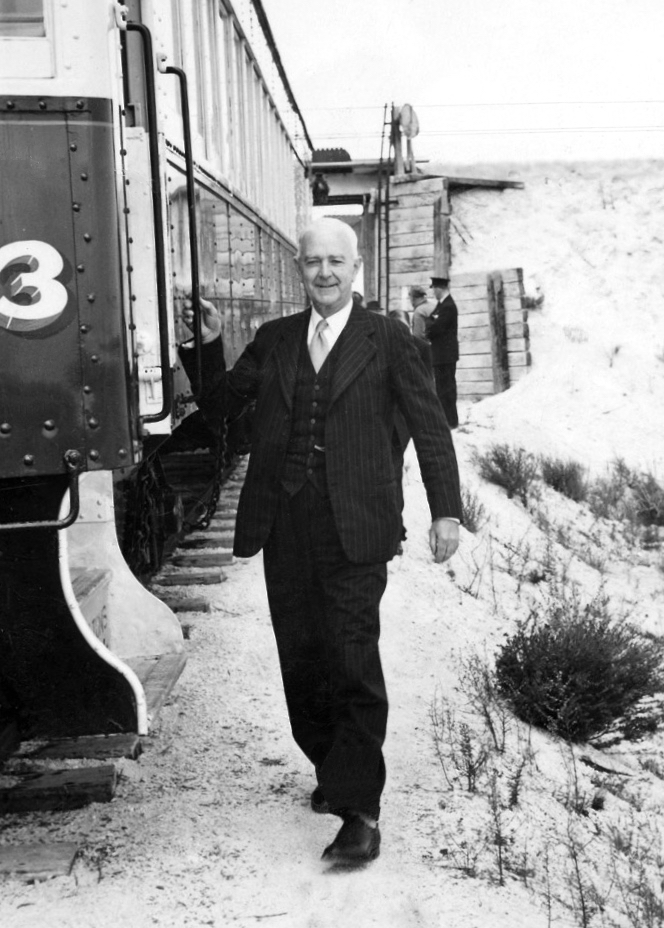
John A. Fargher, a mechanical engineer by profession, became the Railways Commissioneer in 1953. He was Assistant to his predecessor in 1949 on an inspection of gypsum loading facilities at Kevin, on the narrow-gauge Port Lincoln Division.

- Board of Commissioners 1888–1895:

- J. H. Smith
- A.S. Neill
- John Hill.

- Alan G. Pendleton 1895–1909
- Alexander B. Moncrieff 1909–1916
- James McGuire 1916–1922
- William Alfred Webb 1922–1930
- Charles Buxton Anderson 1930–1946
- Robert Hall Chapman CMG 1946–1953
- John Adrian Fargher 1953–1965
- Ron Fitch 1965–1973
- Murray L. Stockley 1973–1975

== Publications ==
In June 1965, Rail News was launched as a quarterly staff newsletter. It was published monthly from January 1970. The last edition was published in March 1973; Keeping Track superseded it the next month.

== See also ==
- Bob the Railway Dog
- Glenelg railway line
- SteamRanger Heritage Railway
- Steamtown Heritage Rail Centre
