= KA class =

KA class may refer to:

- Commonwealth Railways KA class, 2-8-0 steam locomotives
- NZR KA class, 4-8-4 steam locomotives
