= Zeddy =

Zeddy may refer to

- Zeddy Saileti (born 1969), Zambian football (soccer) player then coach
- Zed Al Refai (born 1966), Kuwaiti climber, nicknamed "Zeddy"
- Zeddy (mascot), teddy bear mascot of Zellers, a Canadian chain of department stores

== See also ==
- Zeddie (or Z Class or Takapuna), an old New Zealand sailing dinghy
