= South Australian Railways S class =

Class of Australian 4-4-0 locomotives

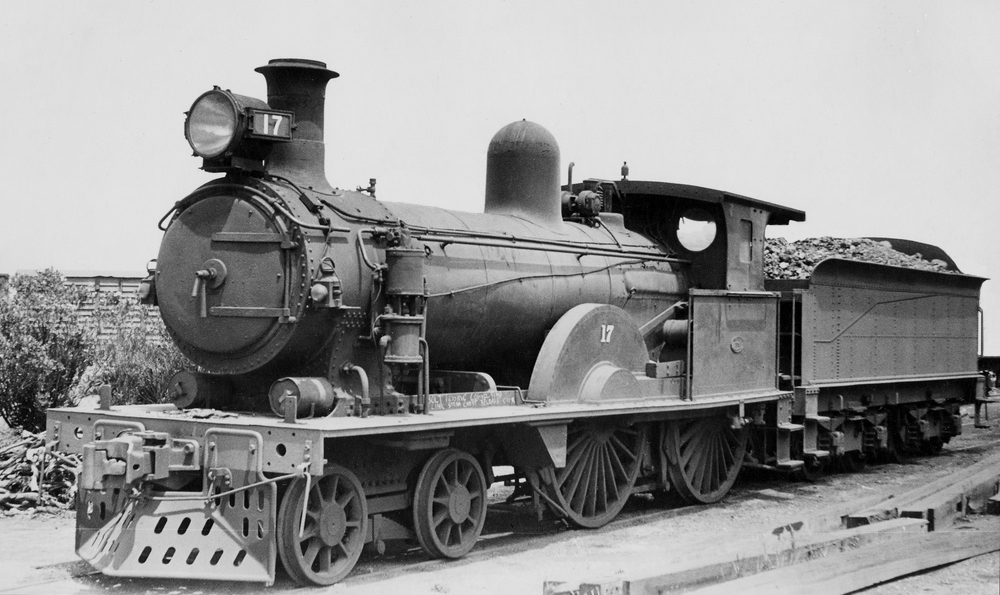
- S class locomotive no 17 at Tailem Bend in 1952
Type and origin
- Power type: Steam
- Builder: James Martin & Co
- Serial number: 71–76, 93–98, 176–181
- Build date: 1894 (12), 1903–1904 (6)
- Total produced: 18
- Rebuilder: Islington Railway Workshops
- Rebuild date: 1915 (No. 13)
- Number rebuilt: 1
Specifications
- Configuration
  - Whyte: 4-4-0 (2′B 2′2′)
- Gauge: 1,600 mm (5 ft 3 in)
- Leading dia.: 2 ft 11 in (889 mm)
- Driver dia.: 6 ft 6 in (1,981 mm)
- Length: 57 ft 5/8 in (17,389 mm)
- Height: 13 ft 3 in (4,038.6 mm)
- Axle load: 12 long tons 15 hundredweight (14.3 short tons; 13.0 tonnes)
- Loco weight: 87,360 lb (39,625.829 kg)
- Tender weight: 96,746 lb (43,883.247 kg)
- Total weight: 184,106 lb (83,509.077 kg)
- Fuel type: Coal
- Fuel capacity: 7 long tons 16 hundredweight (8.7 short tons; 7.9 tonnes), 4 long tons 18 hundredweight 3 quarters (5.53 short tons; 5.02 tonnes) (6 wheel tender)
- Water cap.: 4,120 imperial gallons (18,700 litres; 4,950 US gallons), 2,040 imperial gallons (9,300 litres; 2,450 US gallons) (6 wheel tender)
- Firebox
  - Grate area: 17.37 square feet (1.614 m^{2})
- Boiler pressure: 150 psi (1,034 kPa)
- Heating surface
  - Firebox: 100.24 square feet (9.313 m^{2})
  - Tubes: 1,038 square feet (96.4 m^{2})
- Cylinders: 2
- Cylinder size: 18 in × 24 in (457 mm × 610 mm)
- Valve gear: Stephenson
- Valve type: Piston
Performance figures
- Tractive effort: 12,711 lbf (56.54 kN)
- Factor of adh.: 4.49
Career
- Operators: South Australian Railways
- Class: S
- Number in class: 18
- Numbers: 11, 13, 14, 17, 26, 50, 127-137, 154
- First run: 26.2.1894
- Withdrawn: 1942-1960
- Scrapped: 1956-1961
- Disposition: all scrapped

The South Australian Railways S class was a class of 4-4-0 steam locomotives operated by the South Australian Railways.

== History ==
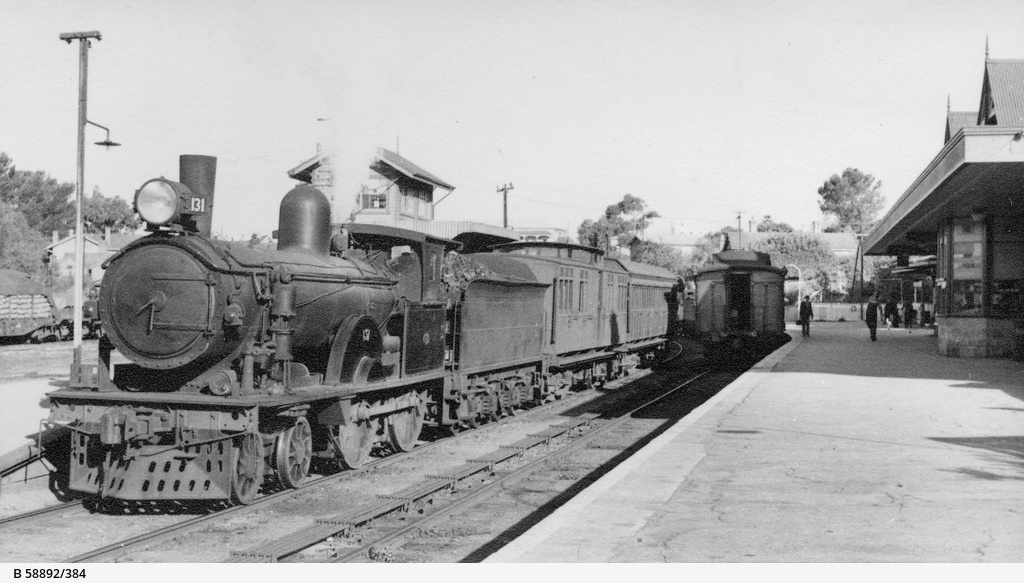
S class locomotive no. 131 at Murray Bridge with a Murraylands passenger train in 1951

The S class locomotives were designed as an express locomotive for the route between Murray Bridge and the border with Victoria. The first 12 were delivered by James Martin & Co in 1894, followed by a further six in 1903/04. They type was notably used to haul the Melbourne Express. The S class had 6'6" driving wheels, the largest of any Australian locomotive, to give it high speeds on low grades.

The engines were pushed out of main line service in the 1920s by 600 class locomotives and Brill railcars. They continued to serve on secondary services into the 1950s. Some locomotives even served in shunting duties despite being unsuitable due to their large wheel diameter. The last examples were retired in 1961.

S136 was set aside for preservation at Islington Railway Workshops while moves were made to preserve it. These fell through and it was scrapped.
