= South Australian Railways Gb class =

Class of Australian 4-4-0T locomotives

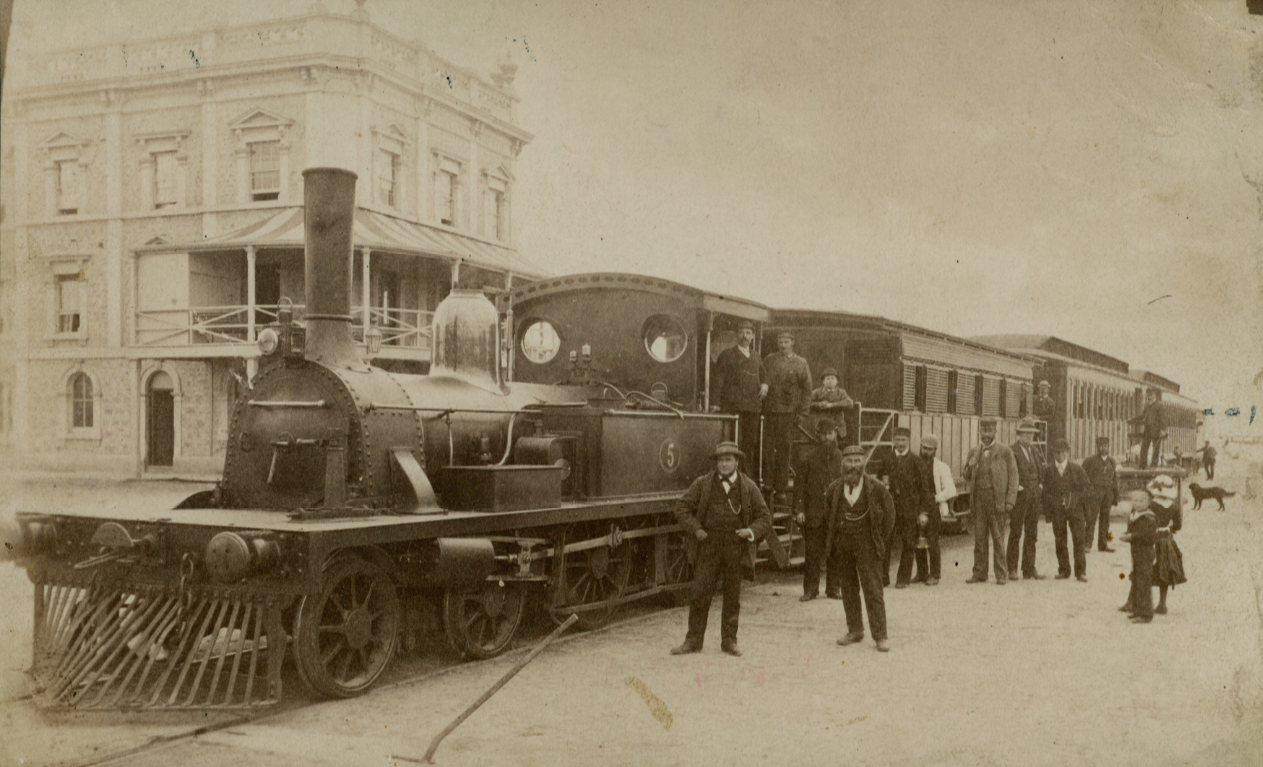
- South Australian Railways Gb class No. 159
Type and origin
- Power type: Steam
- Builder: Robert Stephenson and Company
- Serial number: 2219, 2327
- Build date: 1874, 1878
- Total produced: 2
Specifications
- Configuration
  - Whyte: 4-4-0T
  - UIC: 2'B T
- Gauge: 5 ft 3 in (1,600 mm)
- Driver dia.: 4 ft 0 in (1,219 mm)
- Length: (?)
- Loco weight: 25 long tons 10 cwt (57,100 lb or 25.9 t)
- Fuel type: Coal
- Fuel capacity: 0 long tons 16 cwt (1,800 lb or 0.8 t)
- Water cap.: 460 imp gal (552 US gal; 2,091 L)
- Firebox
  - Grate area: 10.5 sq ft (0.98 m^{2})
- Boiler pressure: 145 psi (1,000 kPa)
- Heating surface
  - Firebox: 56 sq ft (5.2 m^{2})
  - Tubes: 547 sq ft (50.8 m^{2})
- Cylinders: 2
- Cylinder size: 12 in × 18 in (305 mm × 457 mm)
Performance figures
- Tractive effort: 7,814 lbf (34.76 kN)
Career
- Operators: South Australian Railways
- Class: Gb
- Number in class: 2
- Numbers: 158 & 159
- Withdrawn: 1904, 1916
- Scrapped: 1904, 1922
- Disposition: Both scrapped

The South Australian Railways Gb class locomotives were built by Robert Stephenson and Company in 1874 and 1878 for the Glenelg Railway Company, which was later acquired by the South Australian Railways (SAR) on 16 December 1899. The engines were sold to the Adelaide Glenelg & Suburban Railway Company as No. 4 and 5, then subsequently sold to the Glenelg Railway Company in November 1881 with the same numbers. When the SAR purchased the Glenelg Railway Company in 1899, they were classed Gb and renumbered 158 and 159. No. 158 was scrapped in December 1904, while No. 159 persisted until 21 February 1916, before being ultimately scrapped in 1922.
