= James Martin & Co =

South Australian manufacturing company (1848–1915)

- Industry: Engineering and manufacturing
- Founded: circa 1848
- Founder: James Martin
- Defunct: 1915
- Successor: Gawler Implement Manufacturing Co.
- Headquarters: Gawler, South Australia
- Products: Agricultural machinery Mining machinery Railway rolling stock
- Number of employees: 700 (peak)

James Martin & Co was an Australian engineering company which progressed from making agricultural equipment to making railway locomotives.

== History ==
James Martin & Co. was founded in Gawler, South Australia about 1848 by James Martin as a blacksmith and wheelright business. It soon began to manufacture reapers. The opening of the Gawler railway line in 1857 allowed Adelaide, 41 kilometres (25 miles) to the south, to be reached more easily than via the primitive roads of the time. In 1858, Thomas Flett Loutit joined the business as a shareholder and steam power was introduced to the workshop. In 1868 Loutit retired due to ill health. In the 1870s, a new foundry was built on Calton Road.

During this period James Martin’s nephew, John Felix Martin (1844–1916) and Fred May joined him in partnership, with the business now trading as James Martin & Co. The company moved into the production of large pumping equipment, heavy ore crushing plant and winch drums. In 1885, May left the company and founded May Brothers & Co. with his brother Alfred. By 1888 James Martin had acquired more land to the south of the foundry having secured a contract for the manufacture of 52 locomotives for the South Australian Railways This was followed two years later by a contract for a further 92 engines. Employee numbers had grown to 420 by 1888 and by the early 1890s had reached 700.

On 11 April 1890, the first locomotive produced in South Australia was unveiled, entering service on the 29th. The Governor of South Australia and other dignitaries were in attendance. By December 1894, the 100th locomotive had been completed. By 1898, the company had built 170 locomotives for several customers including the South Australian Railways, Tarrawingee Flux & Tramway Company and the Western Australian Government Railways.

Towards the end of the 1890s, business began to decline as the South Australian Railways commenced building its own rolling stock at Islington Railway Workshops and orders for boilers ceased. James Martin died on 27 December 1899. New government contracts were secured in the first few years of the 20th century for bridges, boilers and valve castings. Increasing competition, particularly from May Brothers, together with a heavy debt burden, led to the company entering voluntary administration in August 1907. The works were divided into two separate companies. Some local farmers and businesses formed the Gawler Implement Manufacturing Co to carry on the agricultural part of the business. The major part of the former James Martin & Co. was acquired by Henry Dutton, son-in-law of John F. Martin. He took over the debts and injected capital into the engineering section and foundry, which he continued to operate under the name of James Martin & Co.

The South Australian Railways awarded a contract for 10 locomotives and 100 goods wagons. This enabled the foundry to begin operations again and new contracts coming in allowed the foundry to continue working but only 250 men were employed. Another contract for 140 railway wagons was secured in May 1910 and in July of that same year the company was awarded another contract for 22 locomotives and louvred vans. Later in that same year also, the company won another contract for 21 locomotives. Henry Dutton died in 1914 but the business continued to operate and in March 1915 received orders for 12 narrow gauge boilers.

On 7 April 1915, Samuel Perry purchased the foundry and set up Perry Engineering, taking over the existing contracts with production shifted to Mile End. However, Perry Engineering failed to win the large contracts required to keep the foundry viable and it closed in July 1928. Most of the buildings were demolished.

The company had a siding of the broad gauge (1,600 mm (5 ft 3 in)) Gawler tramway, which connected to the main railway near Gawler railway station.

== Locomotive production ==
James Martin's locomotive production
Client	Loco class	Gauge	No. built
SAR	P	Broad 1600 mm (5 ft 3 in)	14
SAR	Q	Broad	7
SAR	R	Broad	24
SAR	S	Broad	6
SAR	T	Narrow 1067 mm (3 ft 6 in)	34
Silverton Tramway Company	Y (STC)	Narrow	1
SAR	Y (SAR)	Narrow	77
SAR	V	Narrow	4
SAR	Z	Narrow	8
Western Australian Government Railways	G	Narrow	29
Western Australian Government Railways	P	Narrow	2

== Gallery ==
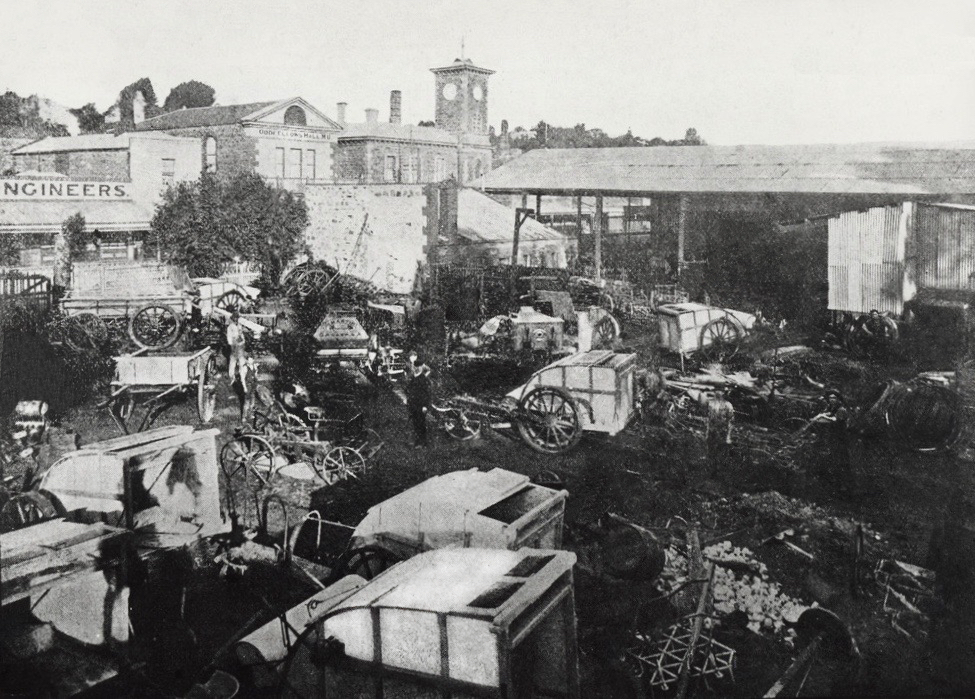
The James Martin & Co. works yard (1906, when production of agricultural machinery continued)

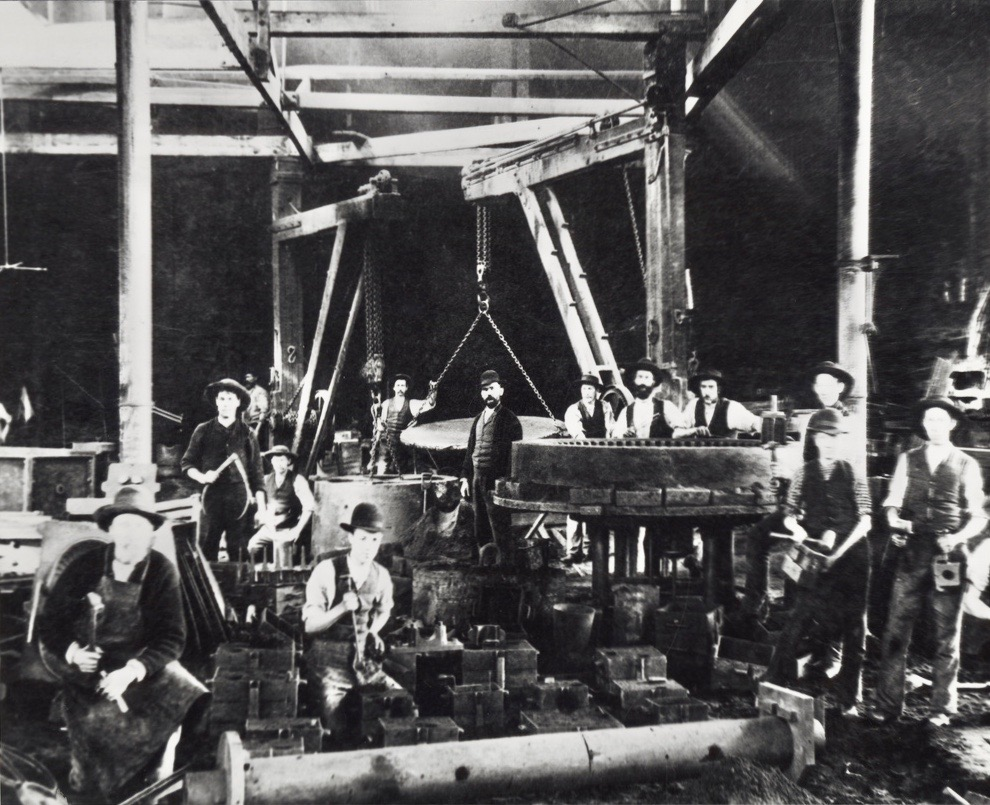
Workers in the 1890s, holding up the tools of trade used in manufacturing locomotives and agricultural and mining equipment

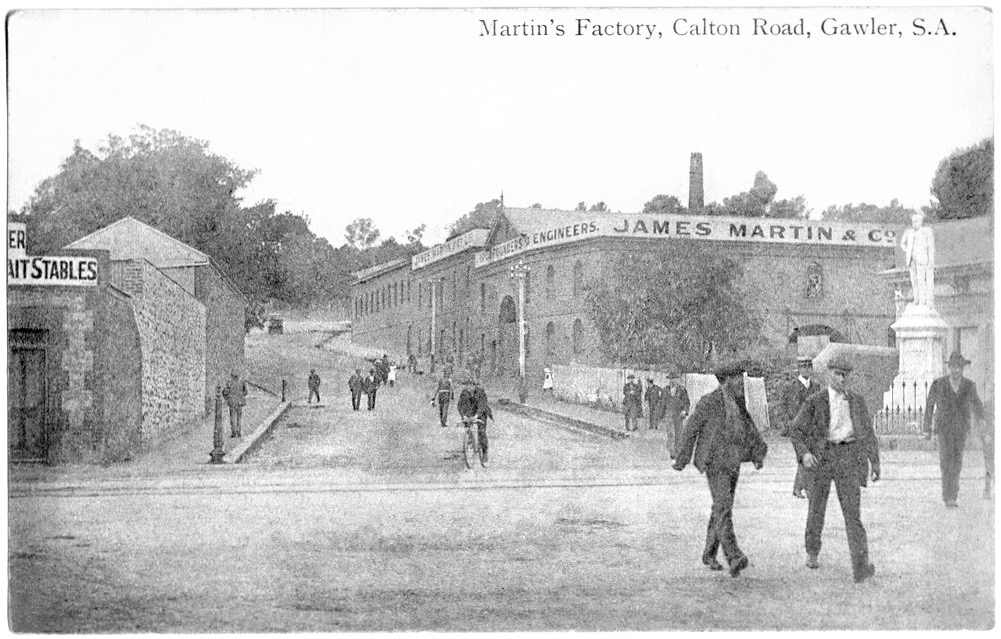
Workers leaving the factory (1907)

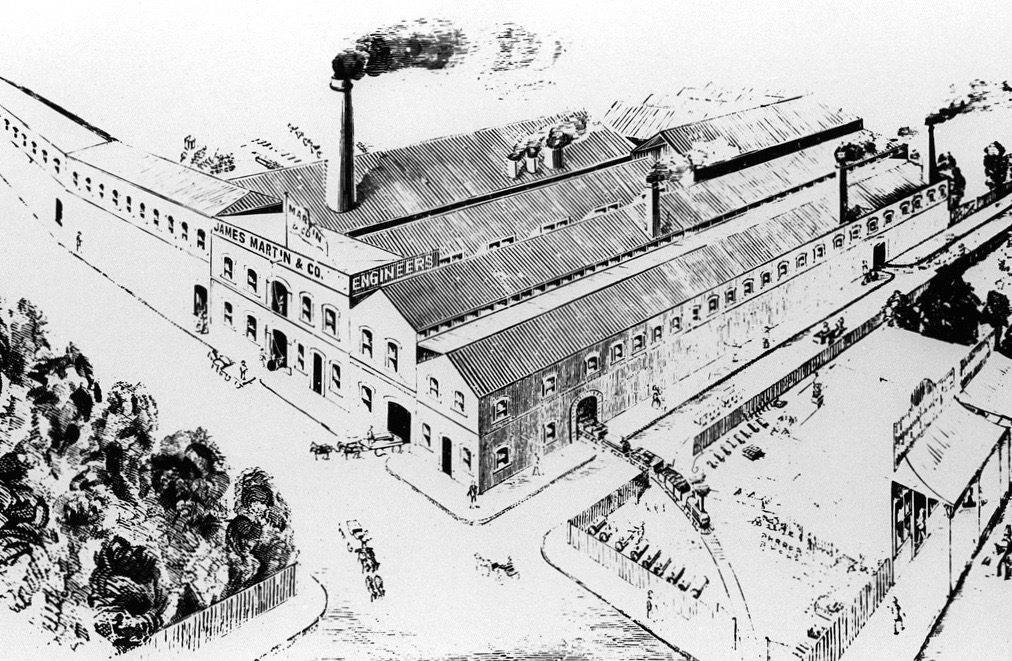
Sketch of the factory (about 1890)

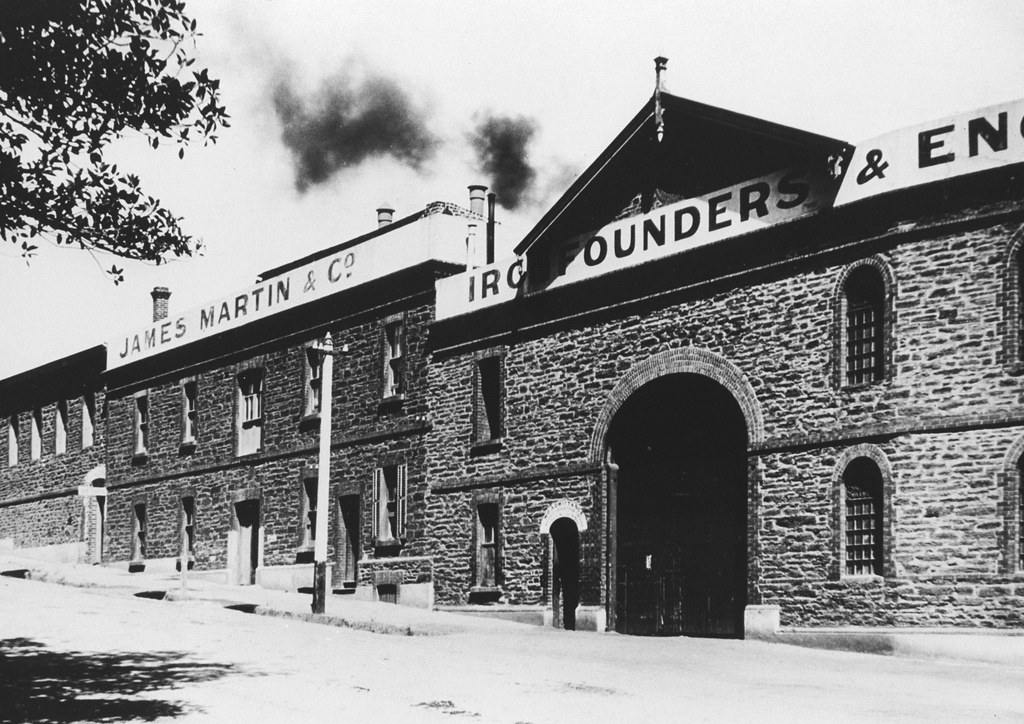
The factory from Calton Road, about 1908. This frontage, unchanged, is now a façade of a shopping centre.

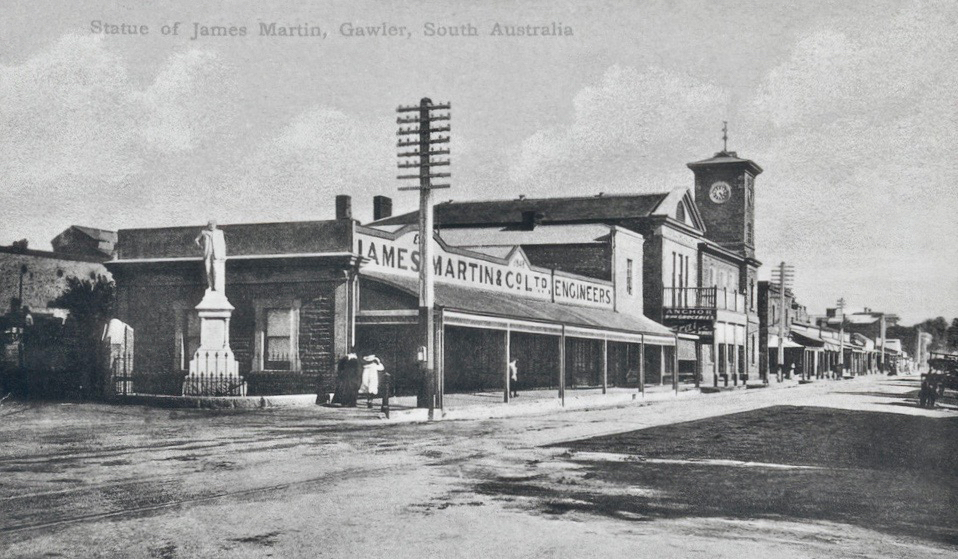
The statue erected in 1890 to honour James Martin's industrial and political achievements

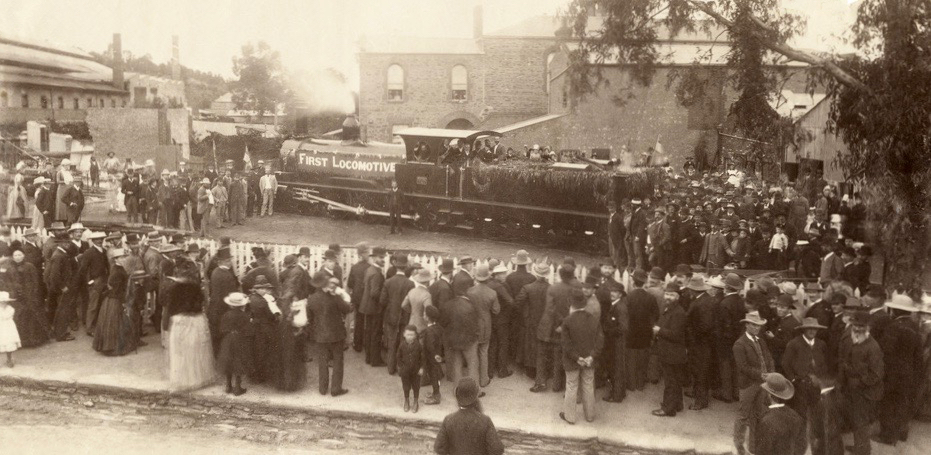
On 11 April 1890 the company launched the first of 24 R class locomotives it built for the South Australian Railways. They were the first locomotives built in South Australia.

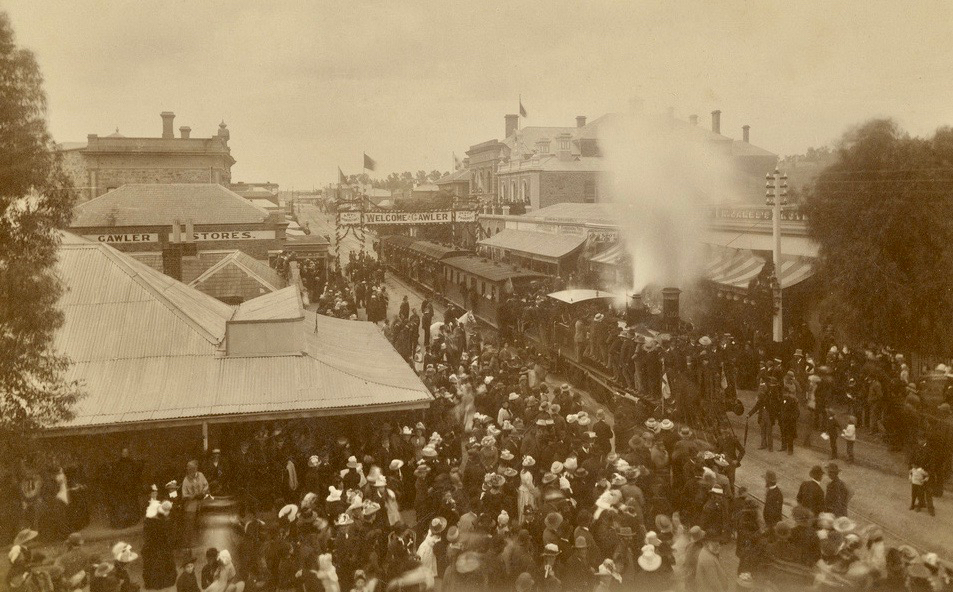
Crowds extended along the town's main thoroughfare, Murray Street; many people clambered on the locomotive and carriages

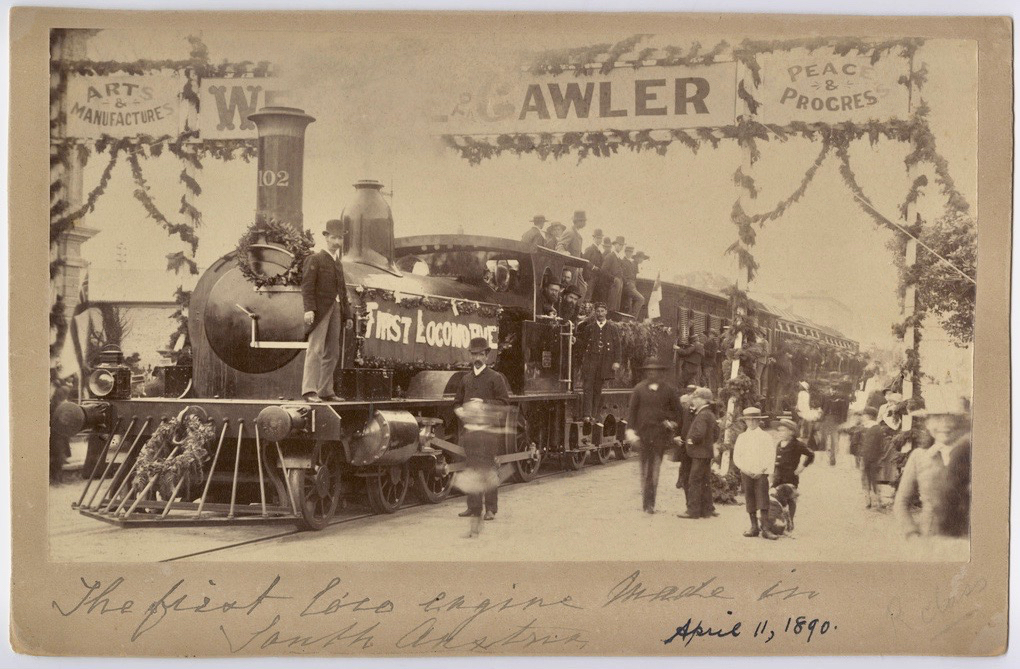
A postcard commemorating the event

== See also ==
- List of South Australian manufacturing businesses
