= South Australian Railways Ga class =

Class of Australian 4-4-0T locomotive

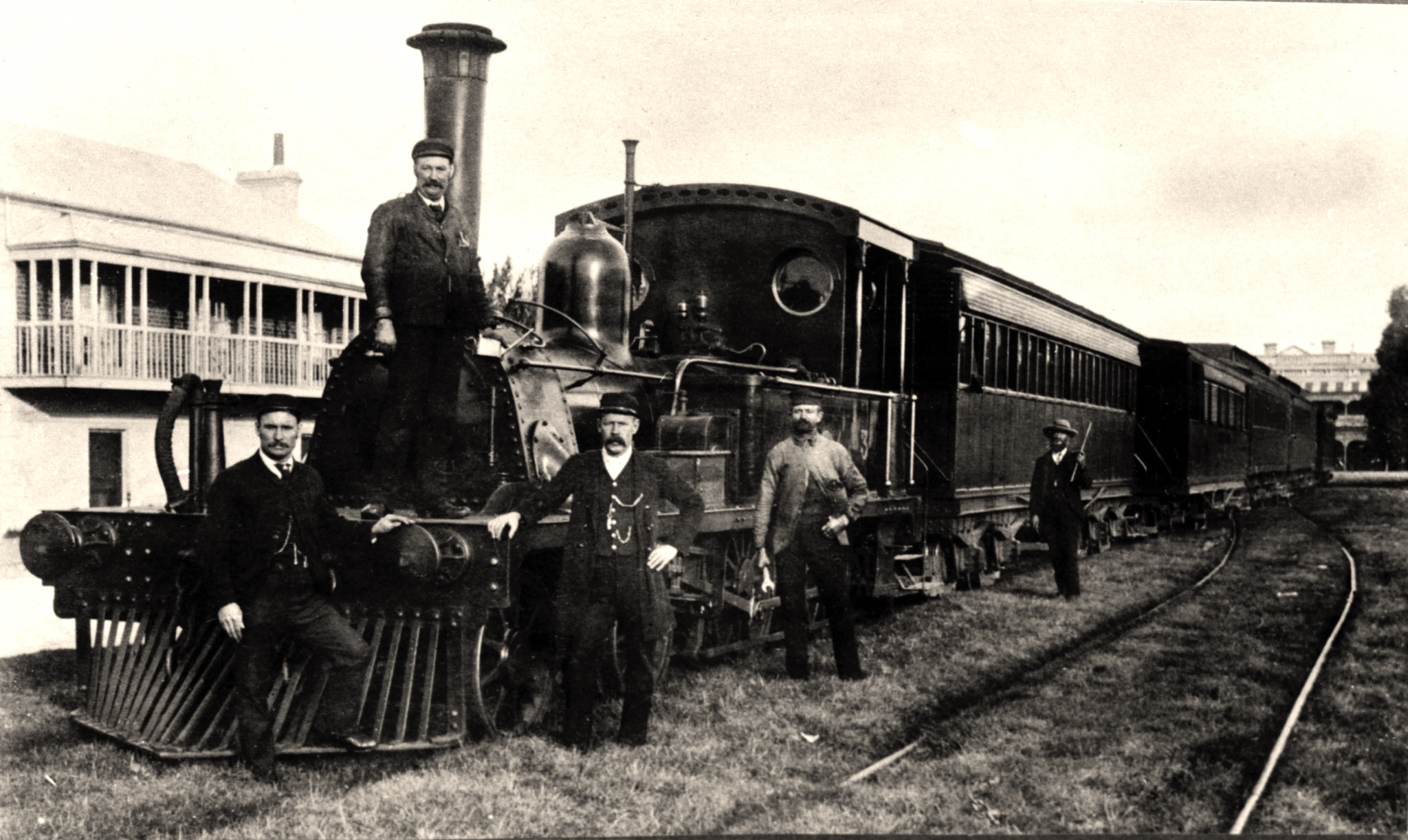
- Glenelg Railway Company No. 3 in Althorpe Place (now named Colley Terrace), Glenelg, South Australia
Type and origin
- Power type: Steam
- Builder: Robert Stephenson and Company
- Serial number: 2213
- Build date: 1874
- Total produced: 1
- Rebuilder: Islington Railway Workshops
- Rebuild date: 1902
- Number rebuilt: 1
Specifications
- Configuration
  - Whyte: 4-4-0T
  - UIC: 2′B n2t
- Gauge: 5 ft 3 in (1,600 mm)
- Driver dia.: 4 ft 0 in (1,219 mm)
- Loco weight: 29 long tons 0 cwt (65,000 lb or 29.5 t)
- Fuel type: Coal
- Fuel capacity: 0 long tons 16 cwt (1,800 lb or 0.8 t)
- Water cap.: 460 imp gal (552 US gal; 2,091 L)
- Firebox
  - Grate area: 10.5 sq ft (0.98 m^{2})
- Boiler pressure: 130 psi (896 kPa)
- Heating surface
  - Firebox: 56 sq ft (5.2 m^{2})
  - Tubes: 547 sq ft (50.8 m^{2})
- Cylinders: 2
- Cylinder size: 11 in × 18 in (279 mm × 457 mm)
Performance figures
- Tractive effort: 7,181 lbf (31.94 kN)
Career
- Operators: South Australian Railways
- Class: Ga
- Number in class: 1
- Numbers: 157
- Withdrawn: 1915
- Disposition: scrapped in 1922

The South Australian Railways Ga class locomotive was built in 1874 by Robert Stephenson and Company for the Adelaide Glenelg & Suburban Railway Company and entered service as No. 3. In November 1881, this locomotive was sold to the Glenelg Railway Company and became their No. 3. On 16 December 1899 this locomotive entered service on the South Australian Railways as Ga class No. 157, after the SAR purchased the Glenelg Railway Company. Ga class No. 157 was rebuilt at Islington Railway Workshops in November 1902 and condemned in May 1915, finally being scrapped in 1922.
