= Perry Engineering =

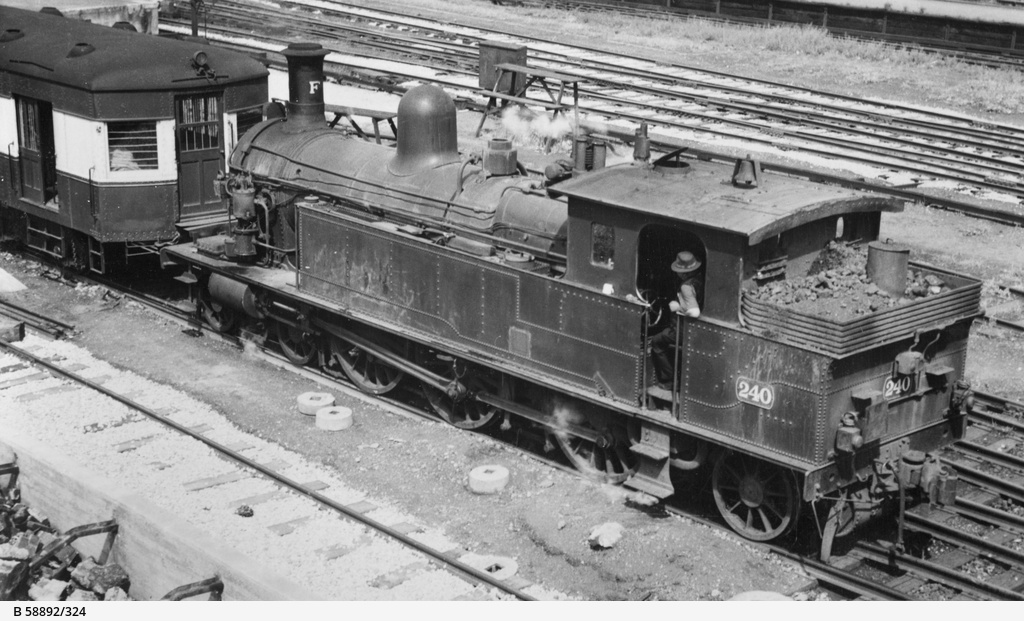
- South Australian Railways F242 in 1952
- Industry: Foundry and steel engineering works
- Founded: 1899
- Founder: Samuel Perry
- Defunct: 1969
- Headquarters: Mile End, South Australia
- Subsidiaries: James Martin & Co

Perry Engineering was a major foundry and steel engineering works in the state of South Australia.

== History ==
Perry Engineering had its origins in 1899 when Samuel Perry purchased from the estate of James Wedlock the Cornwall Foundry on Hindley Street, renaming it the Victoria Foundry. He leased or purchased a nearby property on North Terrace and there established a bridge and girder factory. He purchased a large block of land at Mile End with potential for a private railway siding and around 1911 established the factory there, by 1916 it was known as Perry Engineering.

In 1915, Perry purchased the James Martin & Co Phoenix Foundry works in Gawler from the estate of the owner Henry Dutton of Anlaby. The company had recently lost a major contract for locomotives, which may have affected the price, as may have World War I which was then consuming capital and manpower.

James Martin's locomotive manufacturing business was also being challenged by the state-owned Islington Railway Workshops. Samuel Perry transferred most of the heavy work to the Mile End factory, leaving the Gawler works with the rump of the business. He took on his nephew Frank as works manager at Mile End around 1918; In 1930, on the death of his uncle, Frank took over the company, which in 1937 was registered as Perry Engineering Co. Ltd.

Perry Engineering built locomotives for the Commonwealth Railways, South Australian Railways and Tasmanian Government Railways. It also built 19 locomotives for Queensland sugar cane line operators. The Victorian State Rivers & Water Supply Commission purchased eight for construction of the Hume Weir and nine for the rebuilding of Silvan Reservoir.

During World War II much of the factory was converted to manufacture munitions and defence equipment including two types of vehicles which were sold to the Americans. One of the two vehicles was the Ferret scout car.

A heavy steel manufacturing plant was established in Whyalla in 1958, and the factory at Mile End expanded. In 1947 the company became a public company. In the 1950s, it manufactured mechanical presses for Chrysler, Ford and Holden.

In 1966 Perry Engineering merged with Victorian company Johns & Waygood to form Johns Perry Engineering. The Mile End workshop closed three years later. Ten years later the company had no manufacturing capabilities in South Australia. In 1986 the company was taken over by Boral. As part of a company-wide rationalization, Boral decided to divest its engineering division and subsequently, Perry Engineering was sold to the Pope Electric Motors Group however, due to financial issues and lack of projects & contracts, Pope Electric Motors & Perry Engineering went into administration in 2000 and were subsequently liquidated.

In 2001, most buildings on site were demolished to allow construction of the Mile End Homemaker Centre, then in 2004/2005 the last remaining buildings were demolished to make way for stage 2 of the Homemaker Centre.

== Output ==
=== Products and projects ===
- Anzac Class Frigates - Stabilizers & Rudders
- Bushmaster PMV - (Prototype built in 1995/6, project then sold to ADI Limited sometime around 1996 when Boral divested its engineering division)
- Collins Class Submarines - Hull Segments 300 & 600, Interior Platforms, Drinking Water Piping & Storage Tanks & Thrust Bearings
- Construction Equipment - Trenchers, Tractor Cranes & Crane Borers
- Cranes - (Travelling, Portal, Container & Tractor cranes)
- Controllable-pitch propellers - Joint-venture with Lips N.V of Holland
- Elevators & escalators
- Northern Power Station - Electrostatic Precipitators & Structural Steel
- Olympic Dam Mine Project
- Paper Machines (Contract manufacturing of paper machines for Beloit)
- Perry-Hitachi Reclaimers
- Structural Steelwork - Adelaide Festival Centre, Goldsbrough House, Yallourn W Power Station
- Metal Castings & Forgings
- TACLOP aircraft freight loading system

=== Locomotives ===
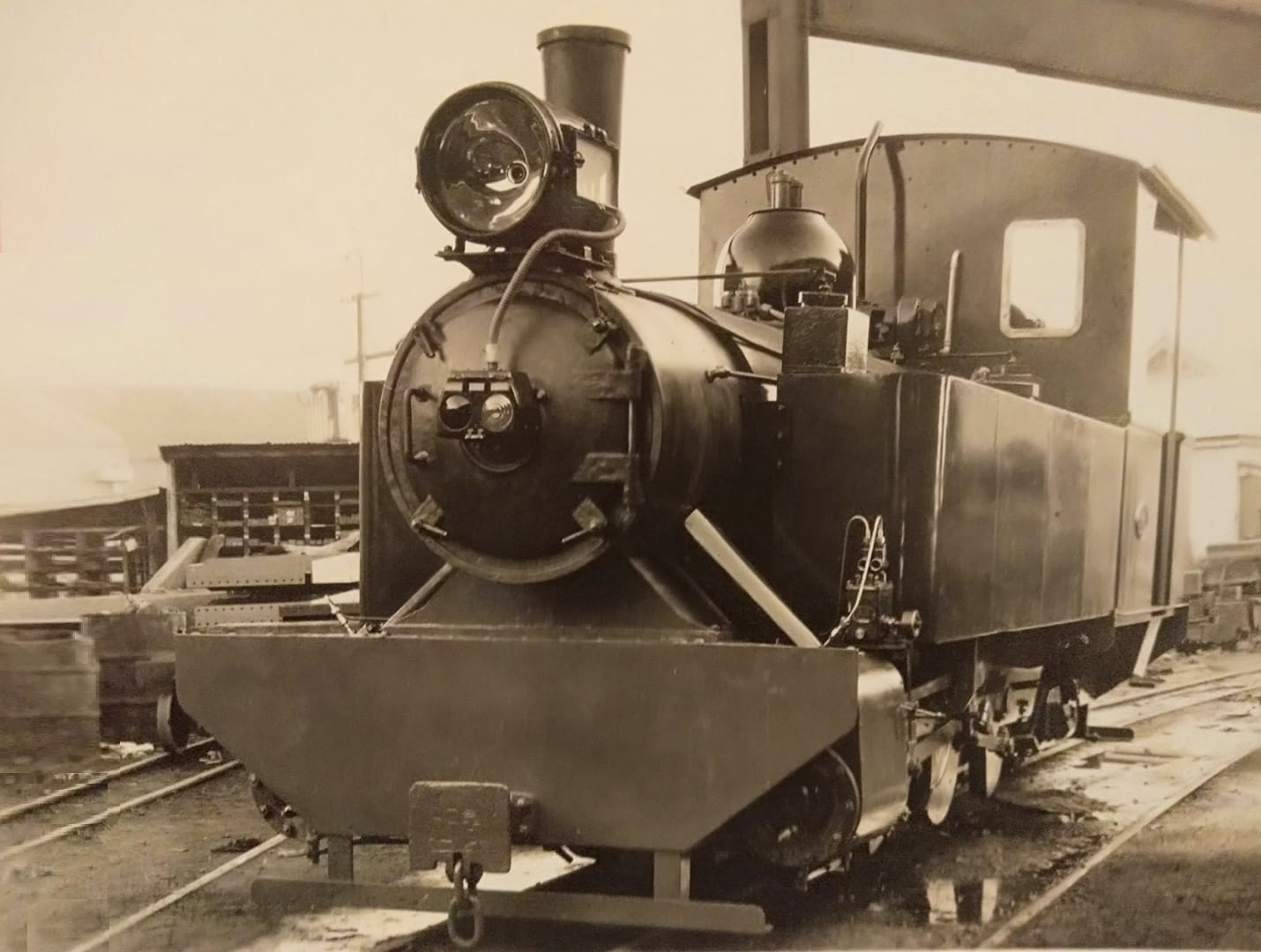
Proserpine Mill No 1 (1939) with a short chimney, the small sand boxes and the red and light lights on the smokebox door

- Commonwealth Railways KA class - 6
- South Australian Railways F class (1902) - 10
- Tasmanian Government Railways Q class - 6
- Tasmanian Government Railways R class - 4
- Industrial steam locomotives, 2 ft (610 mm) (0-6-2) - 4
  - Proserpine Mill No 1 (1939)
  - Chiverton at Kalamia (1938)
  - Carstairs at Inkerman Mill
  - Tully at North Eton No 6 (1941)

== See also ==
- List of South Australian manufacturing businesses
