= Tasmanian Government Railways Q class =

Class of 4-8-2 steam locomotives operated by the Tasmanian Government Railways

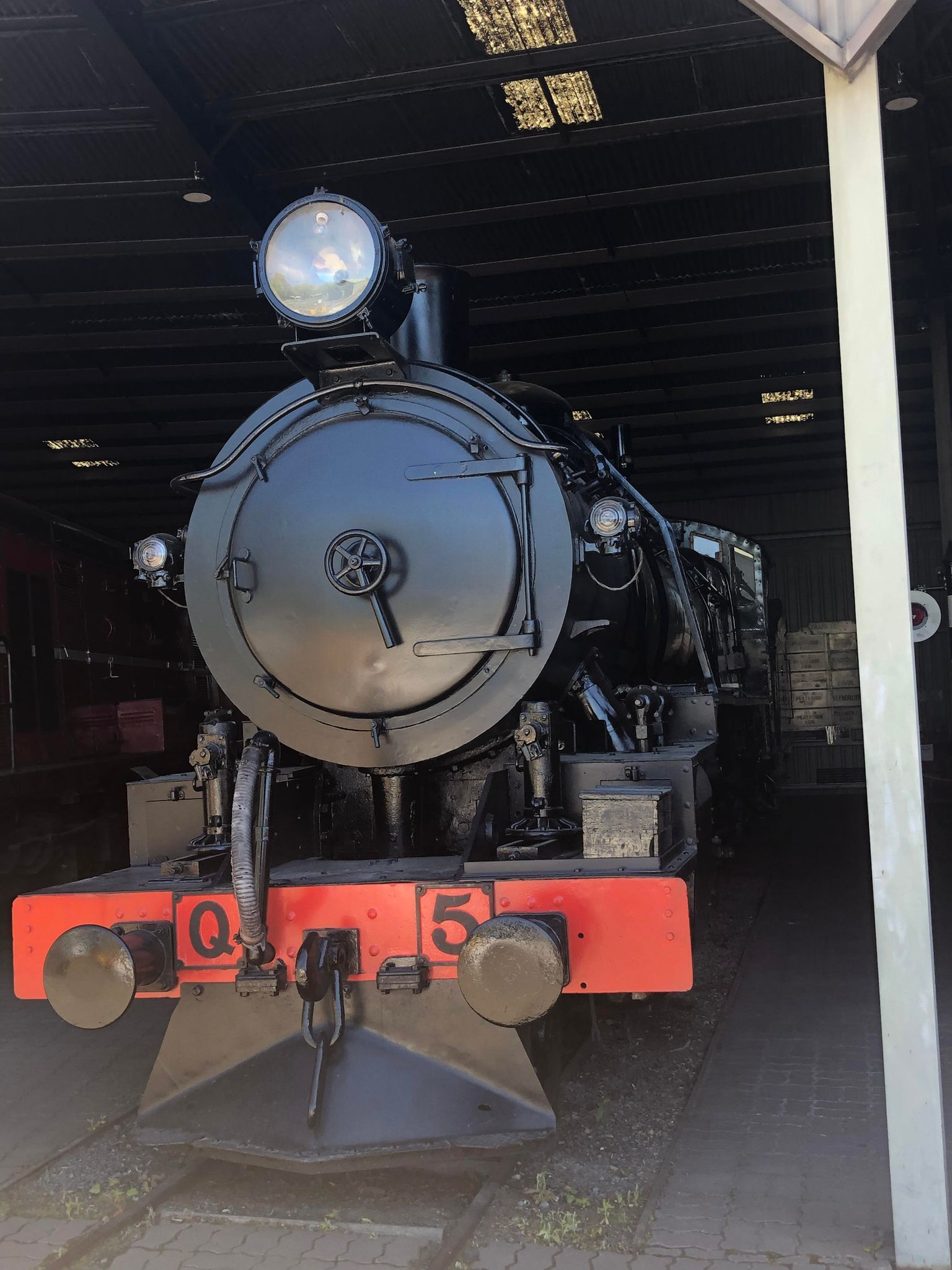
Type and origin
- Power type: Steam
- Builder: Perry Engineering; Walkers Limited; Clyde Engineering
- Build date: 1922-1945
Specifications
- Configuration
  - Whyte: 4-8-2
- Gauge: 1,067 mm (3 ft 6 in)
- Driver dia.: 4 ft 0 in (1,219 mm)
- Total weight: 98 long tons 2 cwt (219,700 lb or 99.7 t)
- Fuel type: Coal
- Boiler pressure: Q1-Q15: 160 lbf/in^{2} (1.10 MPa); Q16-Q19: 180 lbf/in^{2} (1.24 MPa)
- Cylinder size: 20 in × 24 in (508 mm × 610 mm)
Performance figures
- Tractive effort: Q1-Q15: 27,200 lbf (120.99 kN); Q16-Q19: 30,600 lbf (136.12 kN)
Career
- Operators: Tasmanian Government Railways
- Numbers: Q1-Q19
- Retired: 1957-1964
- Preserved: Q5
- Disposition: 1 preserved, 18 scrapped

The Tasmanian Government Railways Q class is a class of 4-8-2 steam locomotives operated by the Tasmanian Government Railways.

== History ==
In 1922/23, the Tasmanian Government Railways took delivery of six 4-8-2 locomotives from Perry Engineering, Gawler followed by a further three in 1929 from Walkers Limited, Maryborough. Between 1936 and 1945, a further 10 were built by Clyde Engineering, Sydney. The final four were delivered with higher pressure boilers.

They operated on the Western, Derwent Valley, Main and Fingal lines. Following the arrival of the X class, they began to operate suburban passenger services in Hobart. The first was withdrawn in 1957 with the final examples withdrawn in January 1964 following the Y class entering service. Q5 has been preserved at the Tasmanian Transport Museum, Glenorchy.
