= South Australian Railways Q class =

Class of Australian 4-4-0 locomotives

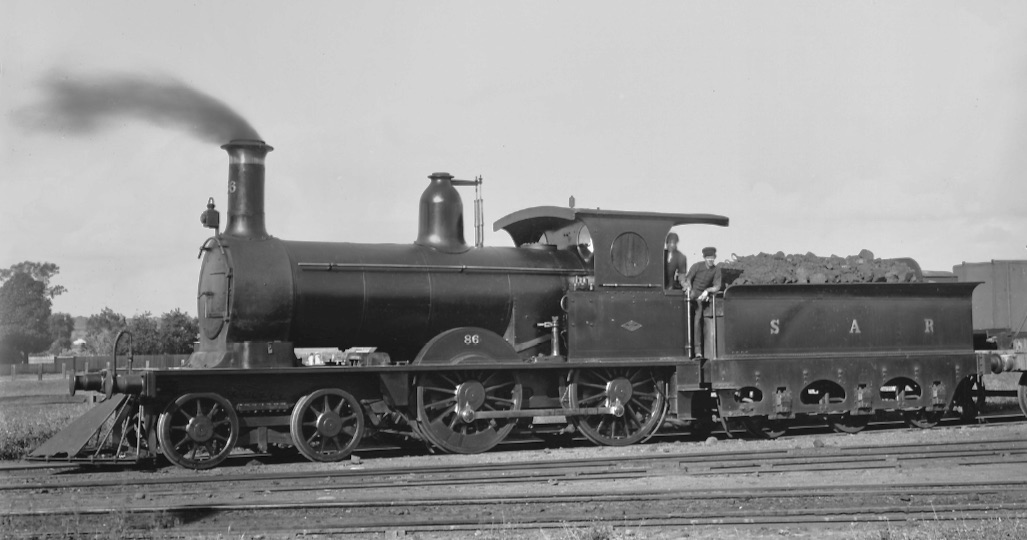
- South Australian Railways Q class No. 86
Type and origin
- Power type: Steam
- Builder: Dübs and Company; James Martin & Co
- Serial number: 2030-2044 & 46-51
- Build date: 1885-1892
- Total produced: 22
Specifications
- Configuration
  - Whyte: 4-4-0
  - UIC: 2'B 3
- Gauge: 5 ft 3 in (1,600 mm)
- Leading dia.: 3 ft (914 mm)
- Driver dia.: 5 ft 1 in (1,549 mm)
- Length: 47 ft 2 1/4 in (14.383 m)
- Height: 13 ft 3 in (4,038.6 mm)
- Axle load: 11 tons 2 cwt
- Total weight: 58 long tons 13 cwt (131,400 lb or 59.6 t)
- Fuel type: Coal
- Fuel capacity: 5 long tons 12 cwt (12,500 lb or 5.7 t)
- Water cap.: 2,040 imp gal (2,450 US gal; 9,300 L)
- Firebox
  - Type: Round-top
  - Grate area: 16.07 sq ft (1.493 m^{2})
- Boiler pressure: 130 psi (900 kPa)
- Heating surface
  - Firebox: 89.2 sq ft (8.29 m^{2})
  - Tubes: 1,032.7 sq ft (95.94 m^{2})
- Cylinders: 2
- Cylinder size: 16 1/2 in × 24 in (419 mm × 610 mm)
- Valve gear: Stephenson
- Valve type: Piston
Performance figures
- Tractive effort: 11,835 lbs
- Factor of adh.: 4.16
Career
- Operators: South Australian Railways
- Class: Q
- Number in class: 22
- Numbers: 76-90 & 108-114
- First run: 1885
- Last run: 1956
- Withdrawn: 1923-1956
- Scrapped: 1923-1956
- Disposition: All scrapped

The South Australian Railways Q class were steam locomotives constructed between 1885 and 1892 by Dübs and Company and James Martin & Co for the South Australian Railways (SAR).

== History ==
The first batch of fifteen Q class locomotives were purchased from Dübs and Company, Scotland to replace the unsuccessful N and O class locomotives on the South Australian Railways "Intercolonial" hills line workings. With the new Q class locomotives being able to haul moderate loads on offer, these locomotives performed very well and the SAR ordered a second batch from the local James Martin & Co. Following the introduction of the more powerful R class locomotives on the southern line, the Q class was put to work on interstate trains from Murray Bridge to Serviceton as well as the northern lines.

These locomotives easily reached speeds of 60 mph (97 km/h), which was required to run these services. They were often seen "double heading" with the S class locomotives on express passenger trains. Q class locomotive No. 90 worked local trains between Murray Bridge and Tailem Bend, and in its final three years of life it spent its time as shunting locomotive at the Islington Railway Workshops.
