= 620 class =

620 class or Class 620 may refer to:

- New South Wales 620/720 class railcar
- South Australian Railways 620 class, 4-6-2 steam locomotives
