= South Australian Railways Gc class =

Class of Australian 4-4-0T locomotive

Type and origin
- Power type: Steam
- Builder: Robert Stephenson and Company
- Serial number: 2380
- Build date: 1879
- Total produced: 1
Specifications
- Configuration
  - Whyte: 4-4-0T
  - UIC: 2'B T
- Gauge: 5'3" Broad Gauge
- Driver dia.: 4 ft. 0 in.
- Loco weight: 24 tons
- Fuel type: Coal
- Fuel capacity: 16½ cwt
- Heating surface
  - Tubes: 368.9 square feet
- Cylinders: 2
- Cylinder size: 13 in. x 18 in.
Career
- Operators: South Australian Railways
- Class: Gc
- Number in class: 1
- Numbers: 160
- Withdrawn: 1905
- Disposition: Scrapped

The South Australian Railways Gc class locomotive was built by Robert Stephenson and Company and entered service on the Adelaide Glenelg & Suburban Railway in 1879. In November 1881, the locomotive was sold to the Glenelg Railway Company and became their No. 6. It entered service on the South Australian Railways on 16 December 1899 following the purchase of the Glenelg Railway Company. The SAR classed this locomotive as Gc and numbered it 160. No. 160 was then scrapped on 26 July 1905.
