= South Australian Railways locomotives 1–3 =

First locomotives of the South Australian Railways

The inaugural trio of South Australian Railways locomotives delivered in 1856
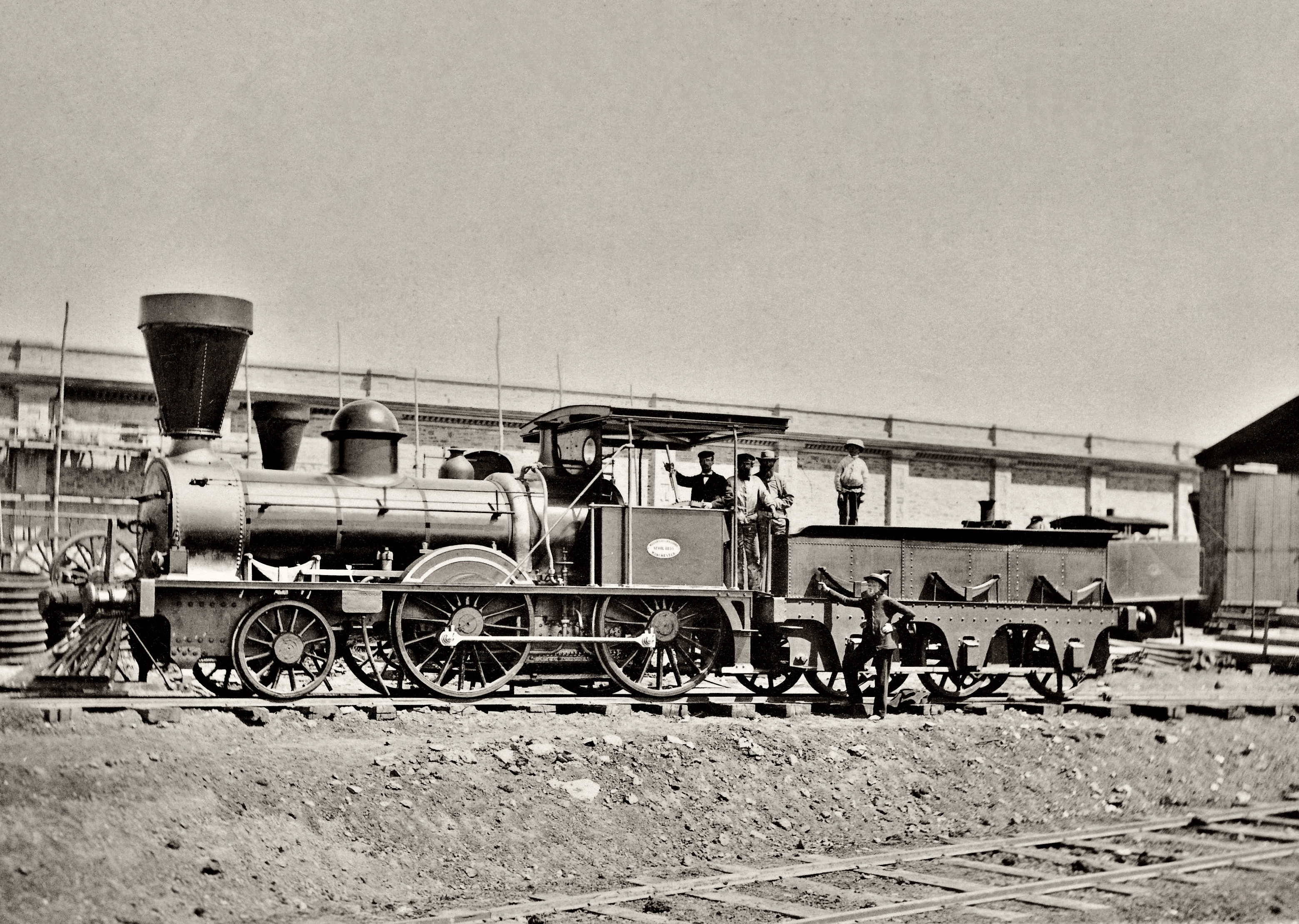
- One of the first three South Australian Railways locomotives, photographed between 1869, when they were converted from well tank to tender configuration to increase their coal and water capacity, and 1871–1874, when they were withdrawn. The locomotive is standing on inverted U-shaped "bridge rails", without fishplates.
Type and origin
- Power type: Steam
- Builder: William Fairbairn & Sons
- Build date: 1855
- Total produced: 3
- Rebuild date: 1869
- Number rebuilt: 3
Specifications
- Configuration
  - Whyte: 2-4-0WT; later converted to tender
  - UIC: 1'B 3
- Gauge: 5 ft 3 in (1,600 mm) Broad Gauge
- Leading dia.: 3 ft 6 in (1,067 mm)
- Driver dia.: 5 ft 4 in (1,626 mm)
- Length: 43 ft 6 in (13,259 mm)
- Height: 14 ft (4,267 mm)
- Loco weight: 25 long tons 18 cwt (58,000 lb or 26.3 t)
- Tender weight: 16 long tons 0 cwt (35,800 lb or 16.3 t)
- Total weight: 41 long tons 18 cwt (93,900 lb or 42.6 t)
- Fuel type: Wood, coke and coal
- Fuel capacity: 2 long tons 0 cwt (4,500 lb or 2 t)
- Water cap.: 1,000 imp gal (1,200 US gal; 4,500 L)
- Boiler pressure: 80 psi (550 kPa)
- Cylinders: 2
- Cylinder size: 15 in × 24 in (381 mm × 610 mm) (other records); 16 in × 21 in (406 mm × 533 mm) (Babbage's records)
Performance figures
- Tractive effort: 5,800 lbf (26 kN) at 75% boiler pressure
Career
- Operators: South Australian Railways
- Class: Not allocated to a locomotive class
- Number in class: 3
- Numbers: 1-3
- First run: 1856
- Last run: 1871-1874
- Withdrawn: 1871-1874
- Scrapped: 1871-1874
- Disposition: All scrapped

South Australian Railways locomotives 1, 2 and 3, the first locomotives delivered to the railway, arrived in time for deployment on the soon-to-be-opened Adelaide to Port Adelaide line. Built in 1855 by William Fairbairn & Sons in Manchester, UK, they arrived at Port Adelaide on the brig Theodore in November 1855, and were unloaded in January 1856; they were assembled and placed service in the succeeding three months. They were named Adelaide, Victoria and Albert but were numbered (1 to 3 respectively) only after many years, and a locomotive class was never assigned to them.

The nascent South Australian Railways had engaged Isambard Kingdom Brunel, chief engineer of the Great Western Railway (GWR), as its consulting engineer and agent for the purchase of railway equipment in the UK, and it is probable that the locomotives were selected by the GWR's locomotive superintendent, Daniel Gooch. Initially the order was for two passenger locomotives and two freight locomotives, but the 20-year-old colony was in severe financial difficulty and the order eventuated as three of mixed-traffic capability.

The three locomotives were initially required to burn coke, but it became obvious that supplies would run out before replenishments arrived. When timber was used as a supplement, the chimneys emitted large amounts of sparks, necessitating spark-arresting chimneys to be fitted quickly. Another very early modification was the addition of a metal roof over the footplate, the only other protection from the weather being a low-profile iron sheet with two small circular windows (spectacle plate) in front of the crew – which was useless for half the time, when the locomotive operated in reverse.

In their original configuration, the locomotives held water in well tanks slung between the frames and the fuel, variously coke, wood or coal, was carried in bunkers situated on either side of the footplate. In a major rebuild in 1869 they were converted to tender locomotives, with tenders supplied to order by Robert Stephenson and Company of Newcastle-upon-Tyne. This modification increased their fuel and water capacity and reduced weight on the locomotive wheels, which had caused excessive track maintenance. With increased range, the locomotives could be deployed on the Dry Creek to Port Adelaide line that had been opened in 1868, and later on the Adelaide to Kapunda line.

Despite the locomotives being sturdy and well built, they had a relatively short life due mainly to the poor quality of water used in their boilers. No. 1 was withdrawn in 1871 and the other two in 1874; all three were scrapped.

In 1884, the locomotive works at Adelaide railway station made use of the driving wheels from two of the locomotives to manufacture a well wagon, which became WL 19, known as The Crocodile. It was used until 1977 to transport narrow-gauge locomotives over the broad gauge when repairs were needed at Adelaide and subsequently at Islington Railway Workshops. One set of wheels is on display at the National Railway Museum, Port Adelaide and the other at SteamRanger heritage railway. Parts of number 2 were used in the 1882 assembly of E class locomotive no. 56.

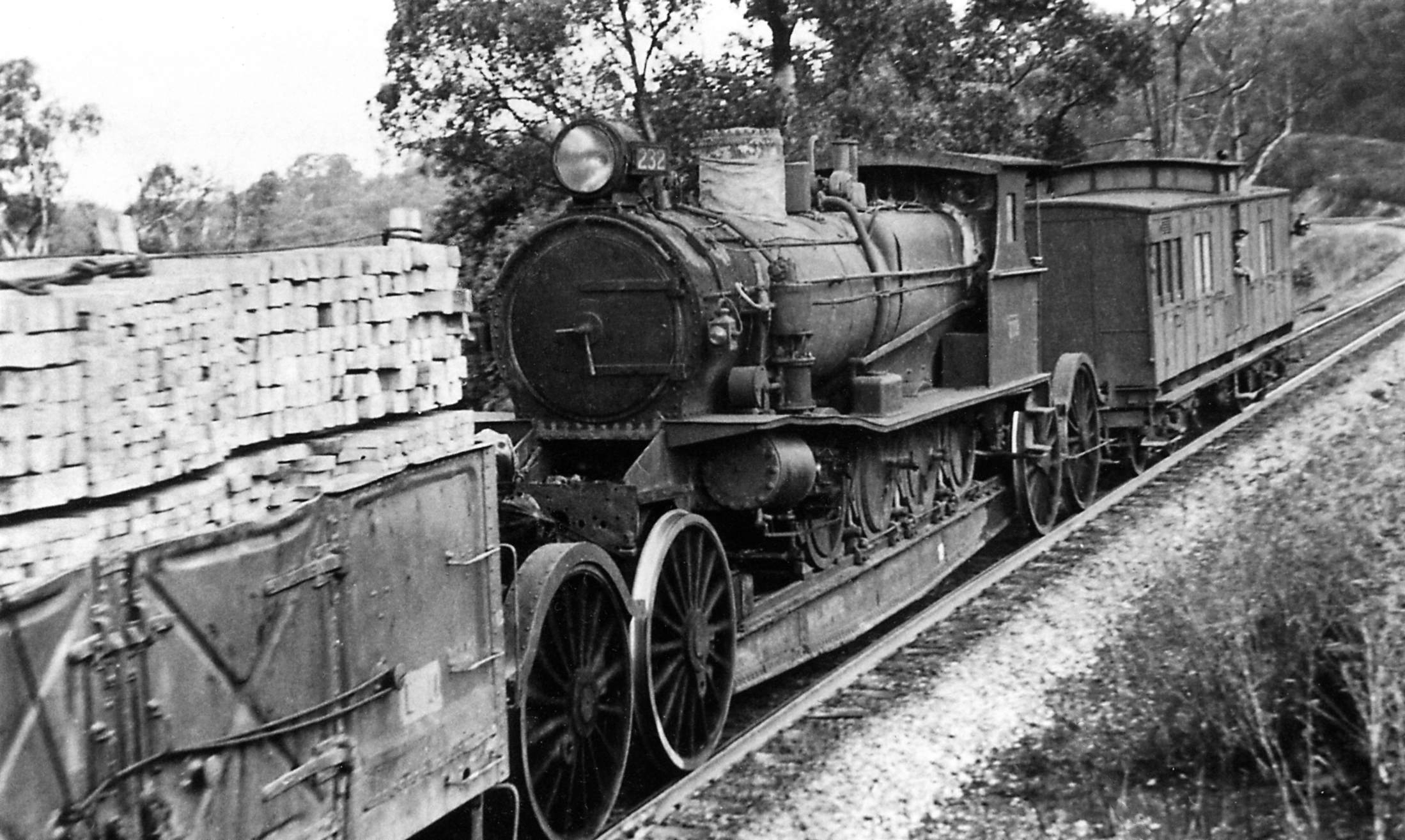
After 28 years on two of the inaugural trio of South Australian Railways locomotives, four pairs of the 1625 mm (5 ft 4 in) driving wheels were repurposed as part of the "crocodile car" that carried narrow-gauge locomotives over broad-gauge tracks for overhaul at the main workshops – a role that lasted another 93 years

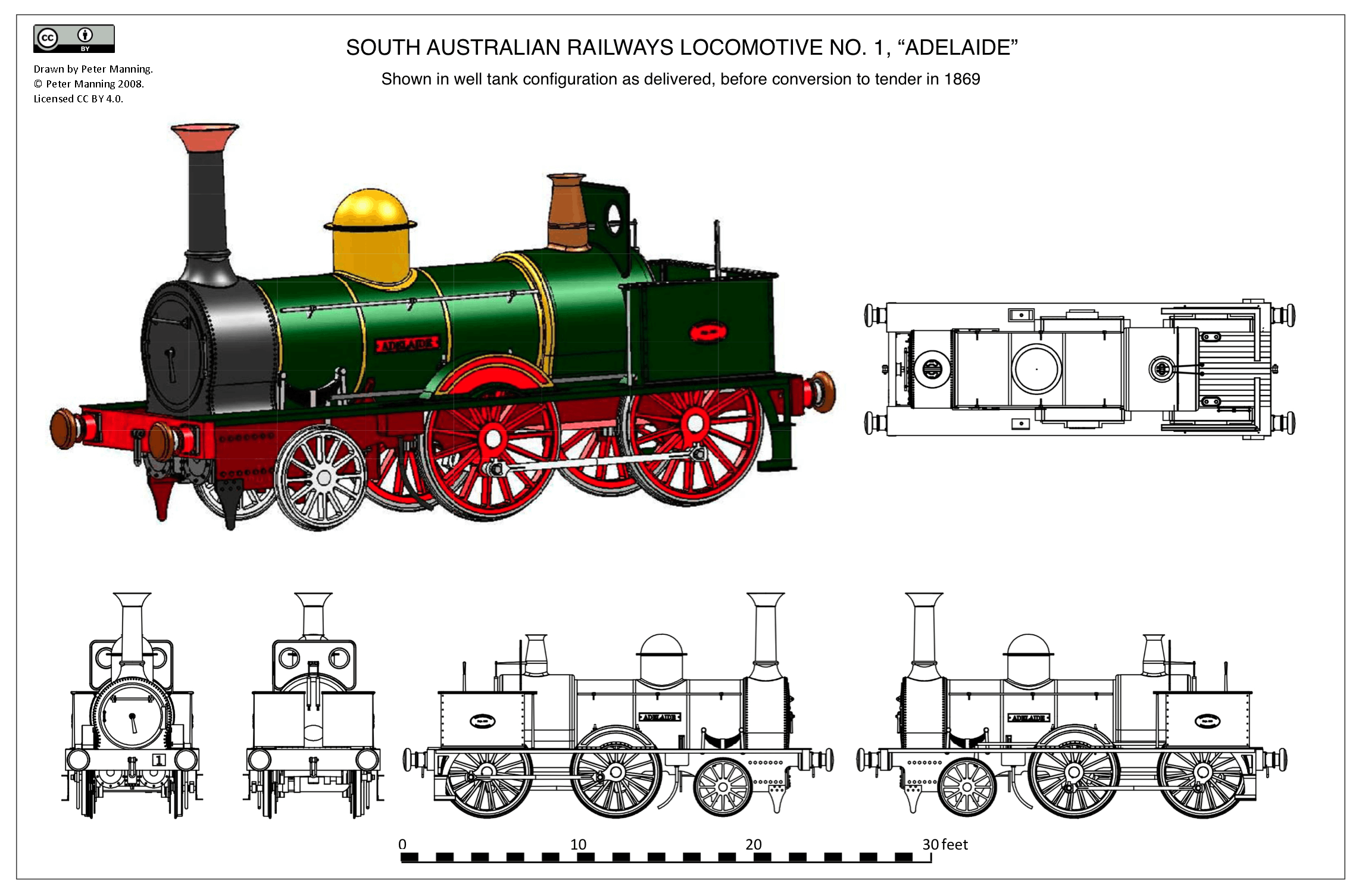
The configuration of the locomotives on delivery in 1856 (click to enlarge)

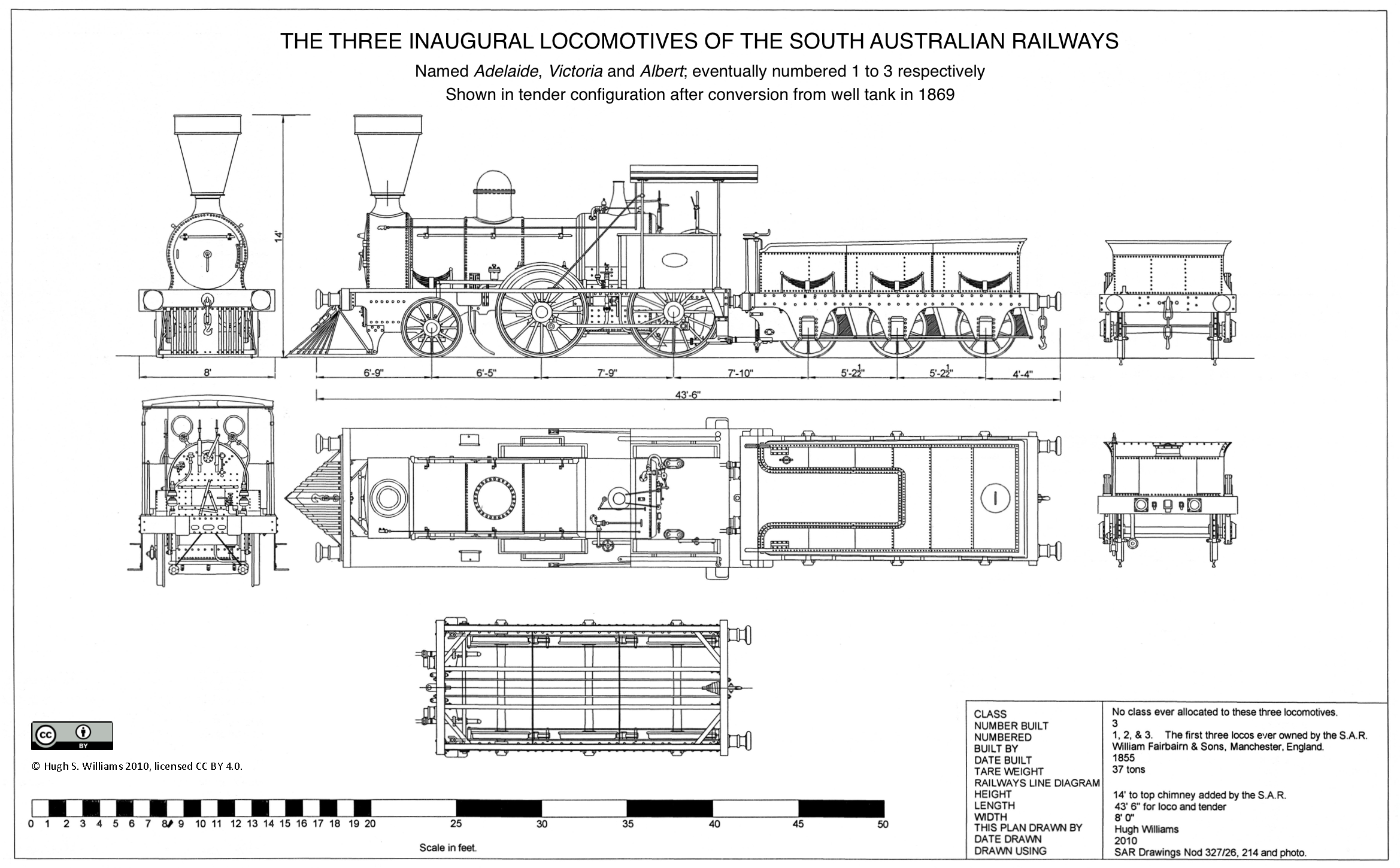
The locomotives after they were converted from well tank to tender configuration in 1869 (click to enlarge)
