= Ron Fitch =

Australian railway engineer

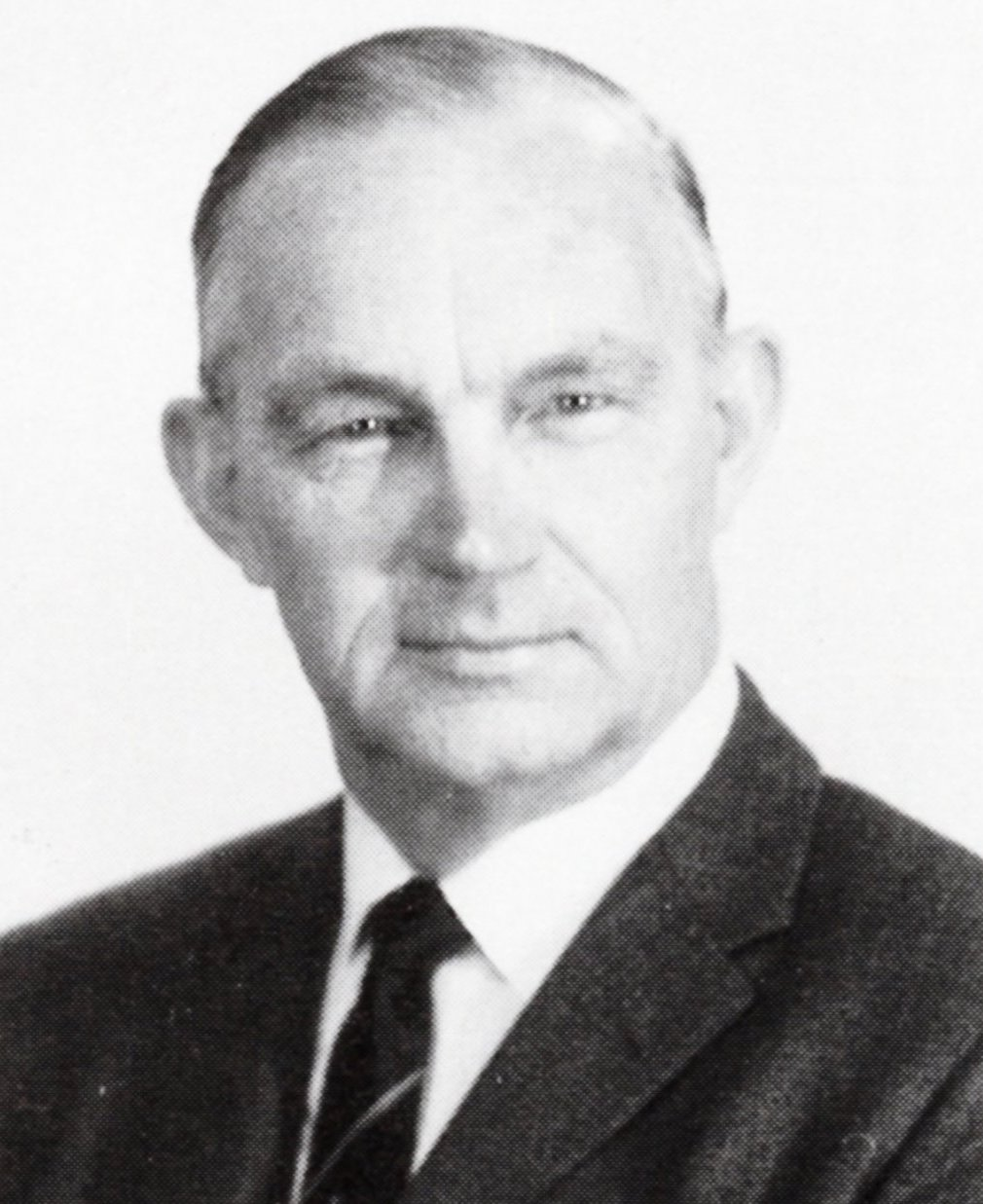
- Ron Fitch when South Australian Railways Commissioner, 1970
- Born: 8 June 1910; Melbourne, Australia
- Died: 20 July 2015 (aged 105)
- Occupations: Railroad executive, engineer

Ronald John Fitch (8 June 1910 – 20 July 2015) was an Australian railway executive and railway engineer. The majority of his working career was with the Western Australian Government Railways, Commonwealth Railways and the South Australian Railways, where he served as the Railway Commissioner from 1965 until 1973.

== Early life ==
Ronald John Fitch was born on 8 June 1910 in Melbourne, Victoria and was brought up in a railway family in the Perth suburb of Subiaco. His father, four uncles, three cousins and a brother-in-law all worked for major government railways in Australia. In 1927 he was admitted to the University of Western Australia under a cadetship from the Western Australian Government Railways (WAGR) and by 1932 had graduated. In 1936 Fitch married Doreen Cowden.

== Career ==
Fitch began his railway career in 1927 with the WAGR as a cadet. During this time he worked in the drawing office of the Way & Works branch as well as spending considerable time working in the countryside and at rural depots. The 1930s depression affected the WAGR and a large number of staff lost employment due to the lack of work. However, Fitch was transferred to Kalgoorlie in 1931 and took up the role of Engineering Assistant. Over the next thirteen years he worked around regional Western Australia before returning to Perth in 1944. Fitch spent the next four years as engineer in charge of design work for the Western Australian railway gauge standardisation report.

In late 1947, Fitch gave a course of lectures on Railway Civil Engineering at the University of Western Australia and during this time proposed to the Faculty of Engineering that he would submit a thesis for the degree of Master of Engineering. His thesis was duly accepted and in 1949 he gained his Degree in Master of Engineering. In May 1949, Fitch left the WAGR after 22 years service and relocated with his family to Port Augusta in South Australia to commence work for the Commonwealth Railways (CR).

Fitch formally became the CR Chief Civil Engineer responsible for the Trans-Australian Railway, Central Australia Railway and the North Australia Railway. During 1951 and 1952, Fitch was a member of the Royal Commission into the route of the proposed new standard gauge railway line from Port Augusta to Leigh Creek. It was during this time that the working relationship between Fitch and then CR Commissioner, PJ Hannaberry, began to break down. Fitch tendered his resignation on 8 February 1954 and was then appointed Assistant to the Railways Commissioner the South Australian Railways (SAR).

Still with the SAR, Fitch's role and title changed in 1959 to Deputy Commissioner, essentially the same role but expanded to include stepping into the more senior role 'when the Railways Commissioner was ill, on leave or suspended from duty'. In late 1962 Thomas Playford, the Premier of South Australia, proposed that the narrow gauge line between Port Pirie and Cockburn on the New South Wales border be reconstructed to standard gauge. Playford approached the Commonwealth Government to provide funding for the project. On 19 April 1963, formal approval was granted and allowed construction work to commence immediately. There was, however, a slight change to the plan. Instead of converting the existing narrow gauge track to standard gauge, a new standard gauge railway line was built next to the narrow gauge route.

In 1966 Fitch became the SAR Railways Commissioner. The standard gauge project between Port Pirie and Broken Hill was completed in late 1969. The SAR planned to hold events at Port Pirie and Peterborough in recognition of those who worked on the project, however these events coincided with industrial action by the Australian Federated Union of Locomotive Enginemen, and Fitch canceled the celebrations at short notice.

During his tenure as Deputy Commissioner and Railways Commissioner for the SAR, Fitch was an important ally to the struggling railway preservation sector in South Australia.

In 1973, after 46 years of service, Fitch retired from the railways.

== Retirement and later life ==
After retiring from the railways, Fitch moved with his wife to Kingscote, Kangaroo Island, for four years before returning to Adelaide. He used his railway life and experience to become a respected railway author and historian; his three books – Making tracks: 46 years in Australian railways (1989), Railroading at its wildest (1993) and Australian Railwayman: from cadet engineer to Railways Commissioner (2006) – were well received by rail enthusiasts and historians.

In 2002, the University of New South Wales conferred on him a PhD for his critical study of the operational and financial performance of the South Australian Railways from 1900 to 1970. He was believed to be the oldest PhD recipient in the world at the time. He was inducted into the Engineers Australia (South Australian Division) Hall of Fame in 2008. In 2009 he was honoured for his keen interest in railway preservation by the National Railway Museum, Port Adelaide when the main display pavilion was named after him. He died on the 20 of July 2015.

== Bibliography ==
- Fitch, Ronald J. (1989). Making tracks: 46 years in Australian railways. Kenthurst NSW: Kangaroo Press. ISBN 0864172702.
- Fitch, Ronald John (2006). Australian Railwayman: from cadet engineer to railways commissioner. Dural, New South Wales: Rosenberg Publishing Pty Ltd. ISBN 1877058483.
- Fitch, Ronald John (2006). Railroading at its wildest. Kenthurst NSW: Kangaroo Press. ISBN 0864174969.
- Linn, Rob (5 November 2004). "Full transcript of an interview with Ron Fitch" (PDF). State Library of South Australia.
