= Charles B. Anderson =

Australian engineer and public servant

Charles Buxton Anderson M. Inst. C.E., M.I.E. (19 August 1879 – 12 December 1953) was a South Australian engineer and public servant, whose last appointment was Commissioner for Railways of the South Australian Railways, 1930 to 1946.

== History ==
Anderson was born in North Adelaide to John Anderson and Mary Elizabeth Anderson, née Akhurst, who married in 1872. He attended Glenelg Collegiate School, leaving at age 13, but while working for John Harrison Packard studied surveying at the School of Mines, proving an apt pupil. and in 1898 entered the public service as a junior draftsman, in the Chief Engineer's Department. Adelaide. In 1899 he was promoted to Surveyor and in 1900 was appointed Resident Engineer at Petersburg, followed by similar positions at Port Wakefield before returning to the Adelaide engineering staff.

In January 1910, he was appointed resident engineer at Petersburg, responsible for the northern division of the railways, then in 1921 he was appointed resident engineer for the midland (broad gauge) line.

Then came the major reorganisation brought on by the new Chief Commissioner W. A. Webb. On 5 April 1923, he was appointed Divisional Superintendent at Adelaide, and in June 1924 Commissioner Webb sent him and B. H. Gillman to Britain and America to study the latest trends in railway management, and on his return was appointed Special Engineer under R. H. Chapman Chief Engineer for Railways.

He was promoted to Acting Chief Engineer for Railways during Chapman's absence in 1926, and that same year was admitted to the Institute of Civil Engineers, London, on the strength of his work for the South Australian Railways. He filled the post of superintendent at Adelaide during the absence abroad of S. H. Watson in 1927.

He succeeded Webb as Commissioner in 1930. Management of the railways during his term as commissioner was generally successful, particularly so during the war, when efficient transport was vital.

On his retirement he was presented with a model locomotive, of a type being built at the Islington Railway Workshops, and locomotive No 527 of the South Australian Railways 520 class was named the C. B. Anderson.

He was succeeded by R. H. Chapman.

He died at his residence in First Avenue, East Adelaide, aged 74.

== Other activities ==
- In 1951 he was appointed chairman of the committee which enquired into the affairs of the Municipal Tramways Trust.
- He was appointed deputy chairman of the Harbors Board after his retirement.
- He was a member of the board of Cellulose (Aust.) Ltd.
- He was a chief of the SA Caledonian Society 1938–1940, and a vice-president of the Hospitallers' Club of the St John Ambulance Brigade.

== Recognition ==
He received the ISO in 1937 and was made CMG in the Birthday Honours of 1944. A locally built locomotive, completed in December 1946, was named "C. B. Anderson" in his honor.

== Family ==
Anderson married Eva Gordon Scott on 22 January 1902; they had five daughters:

- Kathleen Mary Anderson (born 1907) married Hans W. Jaede of Kew, Victoria on 17 November 1932 maybe 24 November
- Joyce Gordon Anderson (born 1909) married Gordon Victor Sando of Toorak Gardens on 3 March 1934; they settled in Murray Bridge
- Barbara Eva Anderson (born 1912) married Charles John Glover of Melbourne on 16 June 1954
- Alison Margaret Anderson (born 1917) married Brian C. Rowe on 3 July 1943, moved to Apsley, Victoria
- Elizabeth Akhurst Anderson (born 1919) married Alfred Dudley Roy Marlow (1918–1986), date not found, residence Royston Park
