= South Australian Railways V class =

Class of Australian 0-4-4T locomotives

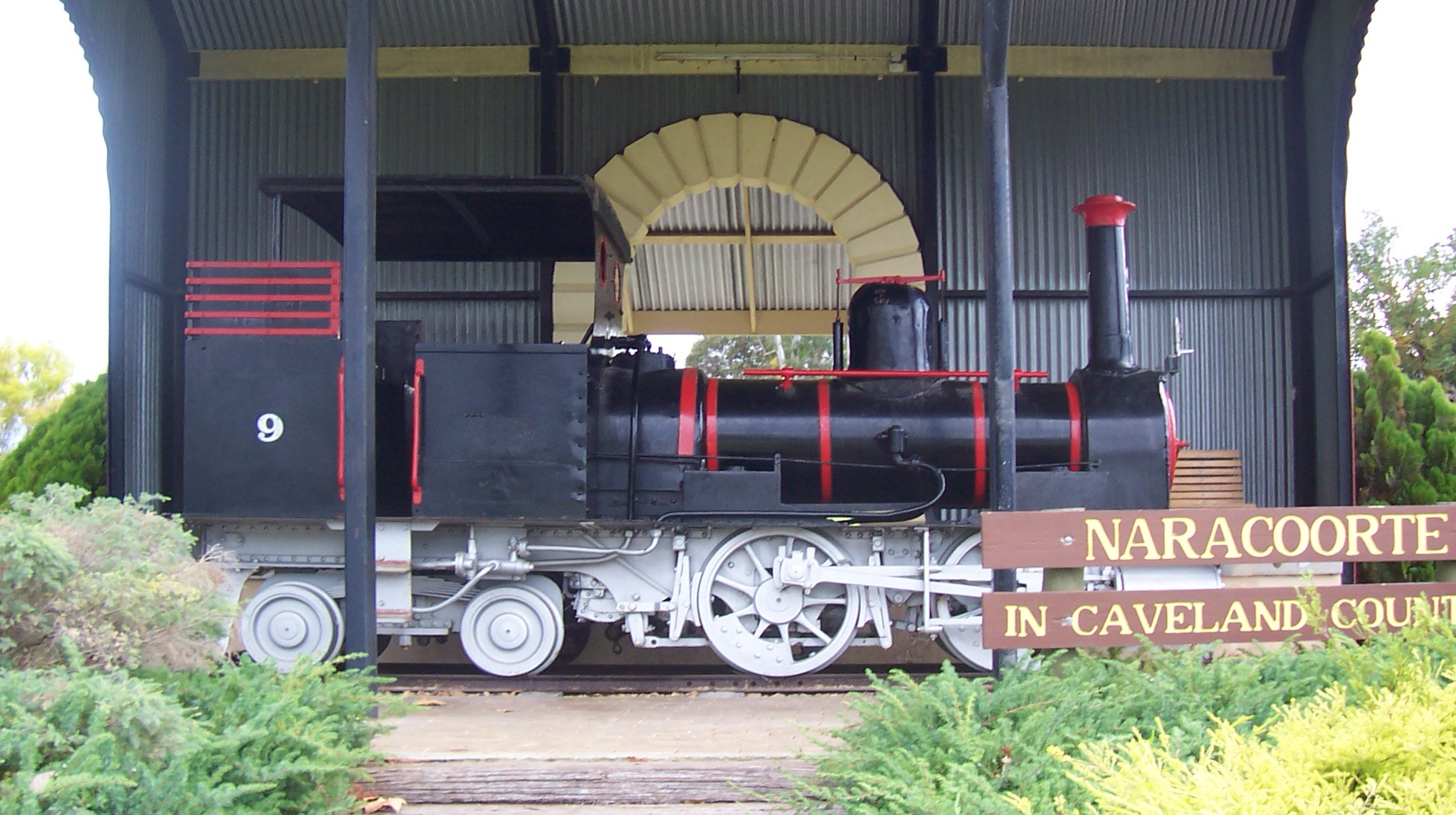
- Preserved V9 at Naracoorte
Type and origin
- Power type: Steam
- Builder: Beyer, Peacock & Co; James Martin & Co
- Serial number: 1597-1599, 1619, 67-70
- Build date: 1876, 1893
- Total produced: 8
Specifications
- Configuration
  - Whyte: 0-4-4
- Gauge: 1,067 mm (3 ft 6 in)
- Length: 21 ft 3.75 in (6.50 m)
- Height: 9 ft 6 in (2.9 m)
- Loco weight: 12 long tons 11 cwt (28,100 lb or 12.8 t)
- Fuel type: Coal
- Fuel capacity: 0 long tons 12 cwt (1,300 lb or 0.6 t)
- Water cap.: 300 imperial gallons (1,400 L; 360 US gal)
- Boiler pressure: 130 psi (896 kPa)
- Heating surface
  - Firebox: 25.6 sq ft (2.38 m^{2})
  - Tubes: 231.3 sq ft (21.49 m^{2})
  - Total surface: 256.9 sq ft (23.87 m^{2})
- Cylinders: 2
- Cylinder size: 9.5 in × 15 in (241 mm × 381 mm)
Performance figures
- Tractive effort: 3,910 lbf (17.39 kN)
Career
- Operators: South Australian Railways
- Class: V
- Numbers: V9-V12, V143-V146
- Preserved: V9
- Disposition: 1 preserved, 7 scrapped

The South Australian Railways V class was a class of 0-4-4 steam locomotives operated by the South Australian Railways.

== History ==
In November 1876 the South Australian Railways took delivery of four 0-4-4 locomotives from Beyer, Peacock & Co, Manchester for use on the lightly laid Kingston-Naracoorte railway line. After final assembly was completed in South Australia, all entered service between January and May 1877. They were built to the same design as the Norwegian State Railways V1 class.

They were not a success being too light and having insufficient water capacity for the 84 kilometre journey, requiring a water gin to be attached. In 1879, two W class locomotives were transferred with V9 becoming the shunter at Kingston wharf and the other three stored.

In 1882, V12 was returned to service at Port Germein before moving to Port Pirie, while in the same year V10 was transferred to Port Wakefield, the latter was joined by V11 in 1885. In 1888, V9 moved to Port Augusta. From November 1891 until May 1893, V11 was loaned to BHP to operate on its lightly laid Broken Hill network. All four were rebuilt between 1891 and 1896. Between September and December 1893, a further four were delivered from James Martin & Co.

They operated at various locations including Peterborough, Port Lincoln, Terowie and Wallaroo. Some were loaned interstate during the construction of the Yallourn Power Station. Most were withdrawn in the 1930s and 1940s with V9 plinthed at Pioneer Park, Naracoorte.

== Class list ==
Number	Builder	Builder's number	In service	Withdrawn	Notes
V9	Beyer, Peacock & Co	1597	February 1877	1953	Preserved at Pioneer Park, Naracoorte
V10	Beyer, Peacock & Co	1598	February 1877	November 1937	Sold into industrial service 1937 withdrawn 1939 Stored until June of 1954
V11	Beyer, Peacock & Co	1599	January 1877	July 1924	Sold into Industrial service 1924 withdrawn 1939
V12	Beyer, Peacock & Co	1619	May 1877 (I) May 1909 (II)	September 1904 (I) March 1940 (II)	
V143	James Martin & Co	67	September 1893	July 1924	Sold into industrial service 1924 withdrawn 1939
V144	James Martin & Co	68	October 1893	September 1906	Sold into private service 1906 withdrawn 1939
V145	James Martin & Co	69	November 1893	July 1924	Sold into industrial service 1924 withdrawn 1939
V146	James Martin & Co	70	December 1893	May 1953	

== Literature ==
- Frank Stamford: And the tail-waggers did all right … The Kingston–Naracoorte Railway in the 1870s – Part 2. In: Light Railways - Australia’s Magazine of Industrial & Narrow Gauge Railways, No 254, April 2017. Pages 16-25.
