= South Australian Railways Z class =

Class of Australian 4-4-0 steam locomotives

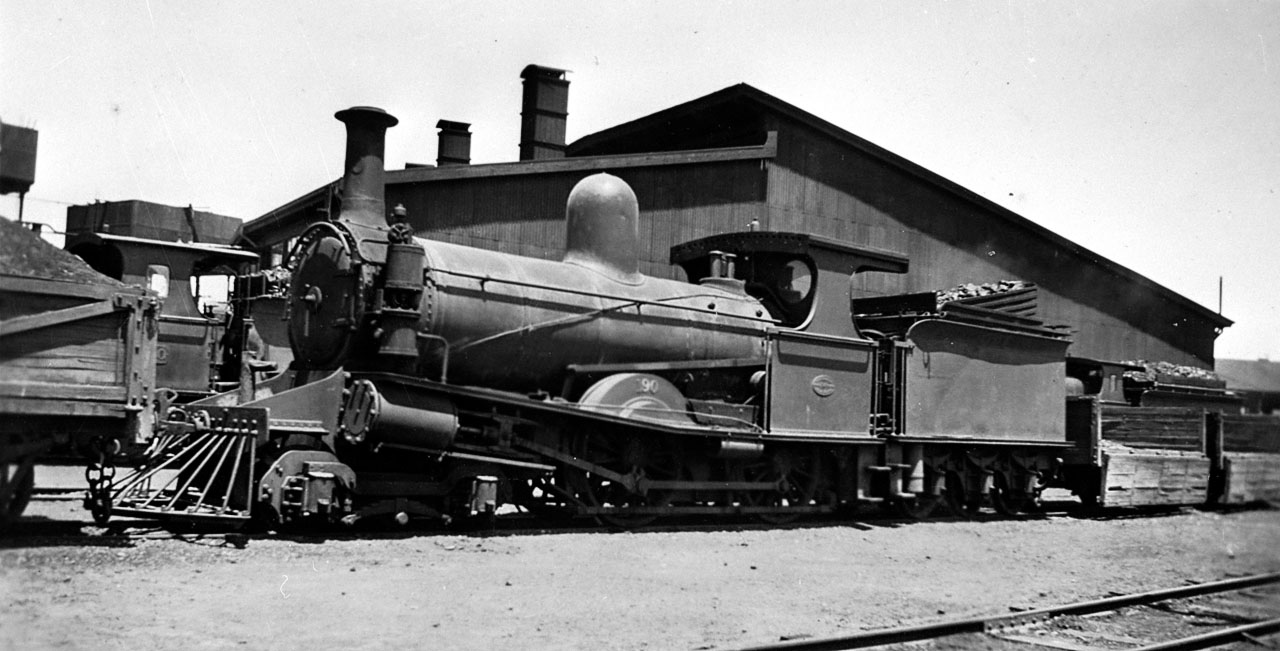
- Z190 c. 1910
Type and origin
- Power type: Steam
- Builder: James Martin & Co; Islington Railway Workshops
- Serial number: 99-106, 18, 19
- Build date: 1894
- Total produced: 10
Specifications
- Configuration
  - Whyte: 4-4-0 2′B 3
- Gauge: 1,067 mm (3 ft 6 in)
- Driver dia.: 4 ft. 6 in.
- Length: 41 ft 10 in (12.75 m)
- Height: 3.5052 Metres
- Axle load: 9 tons 17 cwt
- Total weight: 50 tons 1 cwt
- Fuel type: Coal
- Fuel capacity: 4 long tons 10 cwt (10,100 lb or 4.6 t)
- Water cap.: 1,600 imperial gallons (7,300 L; 1,900 US gal)
- Firebox
  - Grate area: 13.87 square feet
- Boiler pressure: 145 psi (1,000 kPa)
- Heating surface
  - Firebox: 73.93 sq ft (6.868 m^{2})
  - Tubes: 795.22 sq ft (73.878 m^{2})
- Cylinders: 2 Outside
- Cylinder size: 15.5 in × 20 in (394 mm × 508 mm)
Performance figures
- Tractive effort: 10,270 lbf (45.68 kN)
Career
- Operators: South Australian Railways
- Class: Z
- Numbers: Z187-Z196
- First run: 22.12.1894
- Last run: 1956
- Withdrawn: 1956
- Scrapped: 1956
- Disposition: All original locomotives scrapped; one new-build under construction

The South Australian Railways Z class was a class of 4-4-0 steam locomotives operated by the South Australian Railways.

== History ==
In 1895 James Martin & Co delivered eight 4-4-0 locomotives to the South Australian Railways. In 1911 another two were built by the Islington Railway Workshops.

== Class list ==
Number	Builder	Builder's number	In service	Withdrawn
Z187	James Martin & Co	99	22 December 1894	January 1956
Z188	James Martin & Co	100	8 January 1895	January 1956
Z189	James Martin & Co	101	5 February 1895	January 1956
Z190	James Martin & Co	102	20 February 1895	January 1956
Z191	James Martin & Co	103	20 February 1895	October 1956
Z192	James Martin & Co	104	26 February 1895	October 1956
Z193	James Martin & Co	105	26 March 1895	January 1956
Z194	James Martin & Co	106	3 April 1895	October 1956
Z195	Islington Railway Workshops	18	29 September 1911	January 1956
Z196	Islington Railway Workshops	19	23 October 1911	January 1956

== Replica ==
A replica locomotive is being built. It will be numbered Z199.
