= J. A. Fargher =

John Adrian Fargher C.M.G., M.C.E, M.I.E., (13 January 1901 – 1977) invariably referred to as J. A. Fargher, was Commissioner for Railways in South Australia from 1953 to 1966.

== History ==
Fargher was born in North Carlton, Victoria to engineer Philip Fargher and Matilda Maud Fargher, née Blacker, who married in Melbourne on 28 February 1894. He was educated at the Fairfield school, winning scholarships to Melbourne High School and the University of Melbourne, where he studied Civil Engineering, gaining his Bachelor's degree in 1924 and Masters in 1926. In May 1923 he joined the Victorian Railways, and in November transferred to South Australia, where W. A. Webb had just been appointed Chief Commissioner of Railways and was intent on modernizing that state's network. He worked with R. H. Chapman on the new railway bridge at Murray Bridge.

During World War II he was appointed Honorary Lieutenant Colonel, Engineer & Railway Staff Corps (South Australia).

He was appointed acting Commissioner with the death of R. H. Chapman on 10 May 1953, and appointed to the position on 23 October 1953.

He was largely responsible for the conversion of South Australia's locomotive fleet from steam to diesel and diesel-electric.

== Other activities ==
Fargher was involved with R. J. Bridgland in designing the University foot bridge (1937) over the River Torrens and the Birkenhead Bridge (1940) over the Port River.

After designing several air raid shelters in Adelaide during WWII, Fargher was appointed Controller of Air Raid Shelters under the State Emergency Civil Defence Council, directly responsible to Colonel Veale, chairman of the Air Raid Precautions Committee.

== Family ==
Fargher married Elsie Pearl French in Melbourne on 27 February 1926. In 1962 they had a home at 8 Cambridge Terrace, Brighton. They had two daughters and a son, (Note: The son may be Philip John Fargher (1932 – 12 May 2009), engineer, who studied at the University of Adelaide 1950–1954; in 1962 living at 11 Condamine Street, Hillcrest.) including:

- Kathleen Fargher (17 November 1926 – )

Fargher died in hospital and his remains cremated. His wife, son and one daughter outlived him.
