= R. H. Chapman =

Australian engineer (1890–1953)

Robert Hall Chapman (6 January 1890 – 10 May 1953) was an Australian engineer, Commissioner for Railways in South Australia from 1947 to 1950.

== History ==
Chapman was born son of Robert William Chapman and Eva Maude Chapman, née Knox, who married on 14 February 1889, and had a home on High Street, Burnside, South Australia. He was educated at St Peter's College and the University of Adelaide, where he had an outstanding academic career. He enlisted with the First AIF in August 1915, and after training at the NCO School at Mitcham served with the 12th Battalion in France, rising to rank of Captain, wounded in battle, then attached to the (British) 23rd Field Company, Royal Engineers, Calibration Section on Salisbury Plain.

He was appointed to the South Australian Railways as a civil engineer, and in 1923 was tasked with design and building of the railway bridge at Murray Bridge, after which he was appointed chief engineer for the State. He supervised the rebuilding of all railway bridges, station yards and locomotive depots, and the conversion of 220 miles (350 km) of track in the western division from narrow to broad gauge. He supervised the construction, during World War II, of the Finsbury munition works and the early stages of the Salisbury munitions factory.

He was made acting Railways Commissioner with the retirement of C. B. Anderson in 1946, then appointed to the substantive position on 16 January 1947, with a contracted term of seven years.

He died of a heart complaint in the (private) Ru Rua hospital a week after taking sick leave. His assistant, J. A. Fargher, was appointed his deputy while on leave, then Commissioner in October 1953.

== Recognition ==
Malcolm Mcintosh, Minister of Railways, described him as a "great administrator . . . His candid and cheerful manner endeared him to a vast number of friends, and his just administration earned him the esteem of every employe[e] of the railways".

== Other appointments ==
Chapman was the State Government appointee to the board of the Cellulose Company at Snuggery, between Tantanoola and Millicent. He relinquished that position when appointed Commissioner.

== Family ==
Chapman was engaged to Florence Muriel Day, but she married footballer Charlie Perry. He married May Warren "Maysie" Knox (c. 1899 – 11 November 1947) in 1923. Their children included:

- Maysie Hall Chapman (born 1924) married Dean Simes of Barmera on 26 July 1947
- Robert Charles Chapman (born 1928)

They had a home on West terrace, Kensington Gardens.
