= Commonwealth Railways KA class =

Class of Australian 2-8-0 locomotives

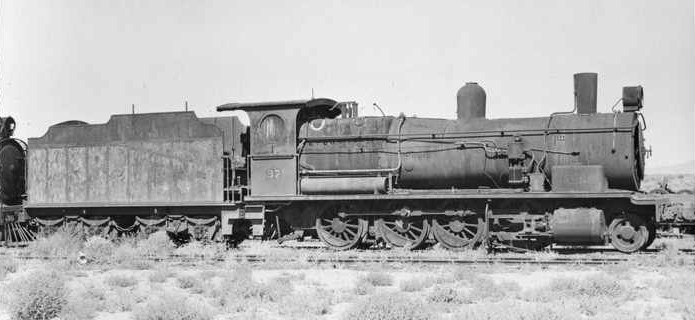
- A KA class locomotive, c 1951.
Type and origin
- Power type: Steam
- Builder: Perry Engineering (6); Walkers Limited (20)
- Build date: 1918-1920
- Total produced: 26
Specifications
- Configuration
  - Whyte: 2-8-0
- Gauge: 1,435 mm (4 ft 8 1/2 in) standard gauge
- Fuel type: Coal
- Water cap.: 4,850 imp gal (22,000 L; 5,820 US gal)
- Cylinder size: 22 in × 26 in (559 mm × 660 mm)
Performance figures
- Tractive effort: 29,609 lbf (131.71 kN)
Career
- Operators: Commonwealth Railways
- Numbers: KA35–KA54, KA56–KA61
- First run: September 1918
- Disposition: All scrapped

The Commonwealth Railways KA class was a class of 2-8-0 tender locomotives of the Commonwealth Railways, Australia. The class operated on the 1,435 mm (4 ft 8 1/2 in) Trans-Australian Railway.

== History ==
Between September 1918 and June 1920, Commonwealth Railways took delivery of 26 KA class freight locomotives built to the same design as the New South Wales Government Railways' TF class (later the D53 class). Six were built by Perry Engineering, Gawler and 20 by Walkers Limited, Maryborough. They were an upgraded version of the K class.

The Perry built locomotives received superheaters in 1943. Three were converted to burn oil during the 1949 coal strike, but were converted back within months.

Most survived until replaced by GM class diesel locomotives with the last withdrawn in September 1952.
