= Zeddie =

Type of New Zealand sailing dinghy

Development
- Designer: R. B. Brown
- Location: Auckland, New Zealand
- Name: Zeddie

Boat
- Crew: 2

Hull
- Type: Monohull
- Construction: Wooden
- LOA: 12 ft 6 in (3.81 m)
- Beam: 5 ft (1.5 m)

Rig
- Rig type: Bermudan rig

Zeddie ( or Z Class or Takapuna) is an old New Zealand sailing dinghy. The first boat was designed and built by Mr R.B. Brown at Northcote (Auckland, New Zealand) in the 1920s. The Zeddie originally was gunter rigged, which shortened the spars for convenience. Some have been converted to Bermudan, no jib and a spinnaker which was sheeted around the front of the mast leading to many capsizes. This rule was changed in the interests of safety. The Zeddie is 12 foot 6 inches long and about 5 foot in the beam.

National Competition was for the Cornwell Cup named after the English boy hero Jack Cornwell. The Zeddie was the major training class for New Zealand teenagers through until the late 1950s. There is still a small fleet of Zeddies sailing in New Zealand in the 2000s. The largest fleet to come together in recent years meets at Whangateau, north of Auckland.

Extensive commentary on the Zeddie is available in the references below by Carter, Anderson, and Kidd.

== See also ==
- Dinghies
- Sailing
