= Class 710 =

Class 710 or 710 class may refer to:

- British Rail Class 710
- GSR Class 710
- South Australian Railways 710 class
