= GSR Class 670 =

Class of 5 Irish 0-6-2T locomotives

GSR 670 Class
Type and origin
- Power type: Steam
- Designer: A. W. Harty
- Builder: Inchicore
- Build date: 1933—1934
- Total produced: 5
Specifications
- Configuration
  - Whyte: 0-6-2T
- Gauge: 5 ft 3 in (1,600 mm)
- Driver dia.: 5 ft 6 in (1,680 mm)
- Trailing dia.: 3 ft 1 in (940 mm)
- Length: 35 ft 6 1/2 in (10,833 mm)
- Adhesive weight: 45.5 long tons (46.2 t)
- Loco weight: 57.5 long tons (58.4 t)
- Water cap.: 1,500 imp gal (6,800 L; 1,800 US gal)
- Boiler pressure: 160 lbf/in^{2} (1.10 MPa)
- Cylinders: 2
- Cylinder size: 18 in × 24 in (457 mm × 610 mm)
Performance figures
- Tractive effort: 16,020 lbf (71.26 kN)
Career
- Operators: Great Southern Railways (GSR); CIÉ
- Class: I3 (Inchicore)
- Power class: KT
- Number in class: 5
- Numbers: 670—674
- Locale: Ireland
- Withdrawn: 1959—1962

The Great Southern Railways (GSR) Class 670 consisted of five 0-6-2T tank locomotives built by Inchicore railway works in 1933 for suburban services south of Dublin to Bray and Greystones.

== Design ==
On the amalgamation of the Dublin and South Eastern Railway (DSER) into the GSR in 1925 the former was found to be short of operational working motive power due to Irish Civil War, maintenance backlog and proportion of stock being life expired. In the interim locomotives from outside the DSER area were used to cover the shortfall.

The commuter services to the south of Dublin were best served by a tank engine. The GSR chose not to continue with any DSER designs but created the GSR Class 850 design incorporating several modern features with a single example being built. The acute motive shortage was resolved by this 1933 design by A.W. Harty. It incorporated the modern type Z boiler used successfully elsewhere but many other features were considered conservative and retrospective compared to the class 850 and in practice they were more difficult to access for repairs and maintenance.

Harty also produced the GSR Class 710 which was a related design but with a tender.

== Service ==
The locomotives almost served exclusively on the Dublin—Bray—Greystones passenger commuter services, though they were also scheduled to work the Wexford Mail from Bray to Westland Row and once at least one of the class was noted in Wexford. They were noted for having some difficulty with timekeeping. A 1948 report noted their shortcomings but also noted they were essential for the suburban services they worked.

== Incidents ==
In 1934 two of the locomotives suffered read end collision damage at Bray. On repair their bunker was extended into the cab increasing coal capacity by about half a ton.

== Livery ==
The carried standard GSR grey livery and painted side numbers from new, acquiring a CIÉ lined green passenger livery with repaints from 1948 onwards.

== Model ==
There is a detailed O Gauge model of engine 670 in the Fry model railway collection.
