= South Australian Railways 700 class =

South Australian Railways 700 class may refer to:

- South Australian Railways 700 class (diesel)
- South Australian Railways 700 class (steam)
