= South Australian Railways 700 class (steam) =

Class of Australian 2-8-2 locomotives

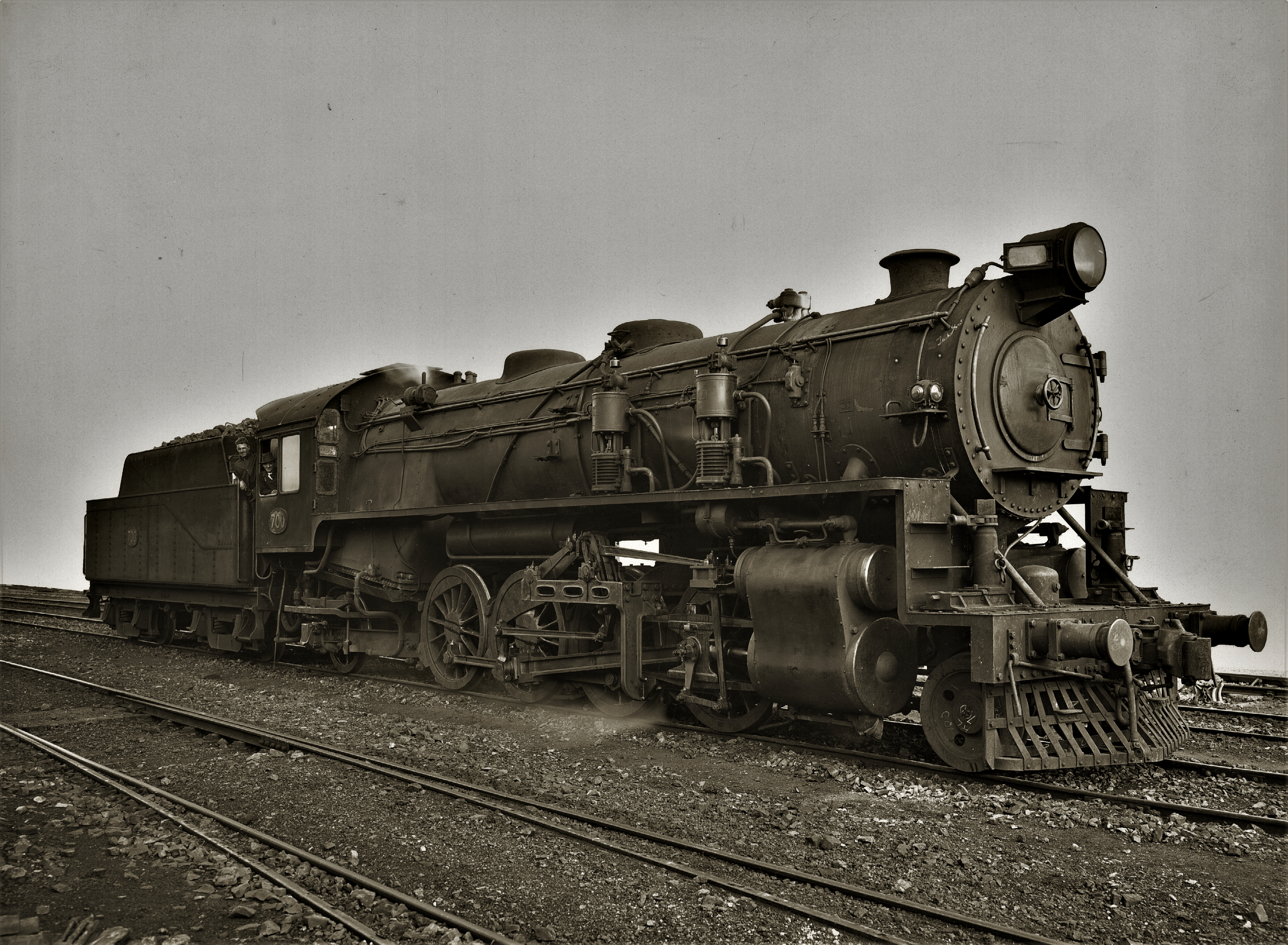
- South Australian Railways 700 class locomotive No. 700, 1926
Type and origin
- Power type: Steam
- Designer: Fred Shea
- Builder: Armstrong Whitworth
- Serial number: 643-652
- Build date: 1925
- Total produced: 10
Specifications
- Configuration
  - Whyte: 2-8-2 1′D1′ 2′2′
- Gauge: 1,600 mm (5 ft 3 in)
- Leading dia.: 2 ft 9 in (838 mm)
- Driver dia.: 4 ft 9 in (1,448 mm)
- Trailing dia.: 3 ft 6 in (1,067 mm)
- Length: 73 ft 2 in (22.30 m)
- Height: 13 ft 6 1/2 in (4,127.5 mm)
- Axle load: 18 long tons 7 cwt (20.6 short tons; 18.6 t)
- Adhesive weight: 70.15 long tons (78.57 short tons; 71.28 t)
- Loco weight: 96.10 long tons (107.63 short tons; 97.64 t)
- Tender weight: 75.95 long tons (85.06 short tons; 77.17 t)
- Total weight: 171 long tons 15 cwt (384,700 lb or 174.5 t); 166 long tons 6 cwt 2 qr (372,570 lb or 168.99 t); 166 long tons 6 cwt 2 qtr (186.28 short tons; 168.99 t) original
- Fuel type: Coal; Oil
- Fuel capacity: 17 long tons (19 short tons; 17 t); 14 1/2 long tons (16.2 short tons; 14.7 t) on 60 lb/yd (29.8 kg/m). rail 2,950 imp gal (3,540 US gal; 13,400 L) oil
- Water cap.: 5,900 imp gal (7,100 US gal; 27,000 L)
- Firebox
  - Grate area: 47 sq ft (4.4 m^{2})
- Boiler pressure: 200 psi (1,379 kPa)
- Heating surface
  - Firebox: 195 sq ft (18.1 m^{2})
  - Tubes and flues: 2,400 sq ft (220 m^{2})
- Superheater
  - Heating area: 619 sq ft (57.5 m^{2})
- Cylinders: 2
- Cylinder size: 22 in × 28 in (559 mm × 711 mm)
- Valve gear: Walschaerts valve gear
- Valve type: Piston
Performance figures
- Tractive effort: 40,418 lbf (179.79 kN)
- Factor of adh.: 4.11
Career
- Operators: South Australian Railways
- Class: 700
- Number in class: 10
- Numbers: 700-709
- First run: 27/4/1926
- Withdrawn: 1959-1967
- Preserved: 702
- Scrapped: 1962-1968
- Disposition: 1 preserved, 9 scrapped

The South Australian Railways 700 class is a class of 2-8-2 steam locomotives operated by the South Australian Railways.

== History ==
=== Delivery ===
As part of William Webb's rehabilitation of the South Australian Railways, ten 2-8-2 steam locomotives were delivered by Armstrong Whitworth, Newcastle upon Tyne in 1926. They were designed to be able to operate across broad gauge branch lines laid with 60lbs rail.

The first locomotive, 700 arrived at Port Adelaide via ship in March 1926. 700 operated for the first time in April 1926 on a trial run north of Adelaide. It was involved in a minor collision when it rear-ended a freight train in May 1926 between Upper Sturt and Mount Lofty. In June 1926, it entered regular service between Adelaide and Murray Bridge, and the 9 remaining 700s were delivered that same month.

The 700s were more common on freight trains but they also hauled passenger trains.

In 1927, 706 had its original trailing bogie replaced with a cast 'Delta' bogie, and it incorporated a booster.

In 1928, the 700s were followed by ten nearly identical 710 class locomotives built at Islington Railway Workshops, which were built with boosters as previously installed on 706.

=== Track restrictions ===
In 1931, 700 and 710 class locomotives with boosters, including 706 were banned from 60lb laid lines because of the weight of the boosters. 706 and a few 710s had their boosters removed so they could operate on 60lb lines, as the 720 class locomotives were banned from operating on 60lb lines and so there were not enough larger locomotives to operate on them. The 700s and 710s faced increasing restrictions on speed, coal and water on 60lb lines during the 1930s. They were eventually barred from operating on the Pinnaroo and Barmera lines, but were allowed again in later years. They were also allowed to operate on the Outer Harbor, Port Dock, and Semaphore lines following platform widening to provide sufficient space for Redhen railcars. However, the gap was not sufficient to allow the 700s to run at track speed past the platforms and so they were subject to severe speed restrictions.

=== Modifications ===
The 700s had minor modifications made early in their operational life to address excessive axle loads and hot bearings. Some other modifications made across the whole class include the replacement of the sand domes with larger ones, the addition of blowdown mufflers in the 1930s, the replacement of the flanged smokestacks with tapered smokestacks, and the relocation of the turbo generators. Some 700s had their single-stage air compressors replaced with single cross-compound pumps.

The locomotives were delivered in an all-black livery, but were outshopped with red buffer beams and red lining after the retirement of William Webb. The red lining was quickly covered by the weathering that the locomotives accumulated in service.

706 was damaged in a head-on collision with another train at Snowtown in 1945. It returned to service with a significantly altered front appearance. The changes included a centre-mounted headlight, a numberplate below the headlight and a replacement pressed-steel pilot instead of the original lattice pilot delivered with Webb locomotives. For a short period of time it had a fabricated smokestack similar to the style seen on the 740 class locomotives but later received the standard tapered smokestack.

Coal shortages after World War II saw a number converted to burn oil, and some were converted to burn a mixture of coal and oil. Most were later converted back to coal burners, with the exception of 708. Coal pushers were also installed on some locomotives. All had their buffers removed in the 1940s following the changeover to automatic couplers in South Australia.

=== Withdrawal and preservation ===
The first two were withdrawn in June 1959 with the remainder replaced as 830 diesel locomotives entered service. Class leader 700 was the last in service, being withdrawn after a series of farewell tours named 'Sayonara Mikado', which occurred across the weekend of 1-2 June, 1968. 700 hauled the first 'Sayonara Mikado' trip which went to Angaston, and ended up joining the second trip with 718 to Victor Harbor to cover for a failed Rx224. The 2 locomotives double-headed back to Adelaide, hours behind schedule due to 718 derailing on the Victor Harbor turntable, and were withdrawn from service after arriving in the early hours of 3 June.

The National Railway Museum, Port Adelaide has preserved 702. It was originally moved to the Mile End Railway Museum in June 1965, before moving to the current museum site at Port Adelaide in 1988.

== Class list ==
Number	Date in Service	Date Withdrawn/Condemned	Mileage
700	27 April 1926	3 June 1968	781,660 mi (1,257,960 km)
701	28 August 1926	28 October 1966	864,438 mi (1,391,178 km)
702	20 September 1926	9 July 1964 (Preserved)	775,526 mi (1,248,088 km)
703	10 September 1926	9 June 1959	1,068,326 mi (1,719,304 km)
704	13 September 1926	14 April 1960	797,179 mi (1,282,935 km)
705	4 October 1926	6 July 1961	738,250 mi (1,188,098 km)
706	28 September 1926	7 September 1967	691,951 mi (1,113,587 km)
707	16 September 1926	9 June 1959	958,431 mi (1,542,445 km)
708	29 September 1926	28 October 1966	782,696 mi (1,259,627 km)
709	7 October 1926	28 October 1966	694,798 mi (1,118,168 km)

== Gallery ==
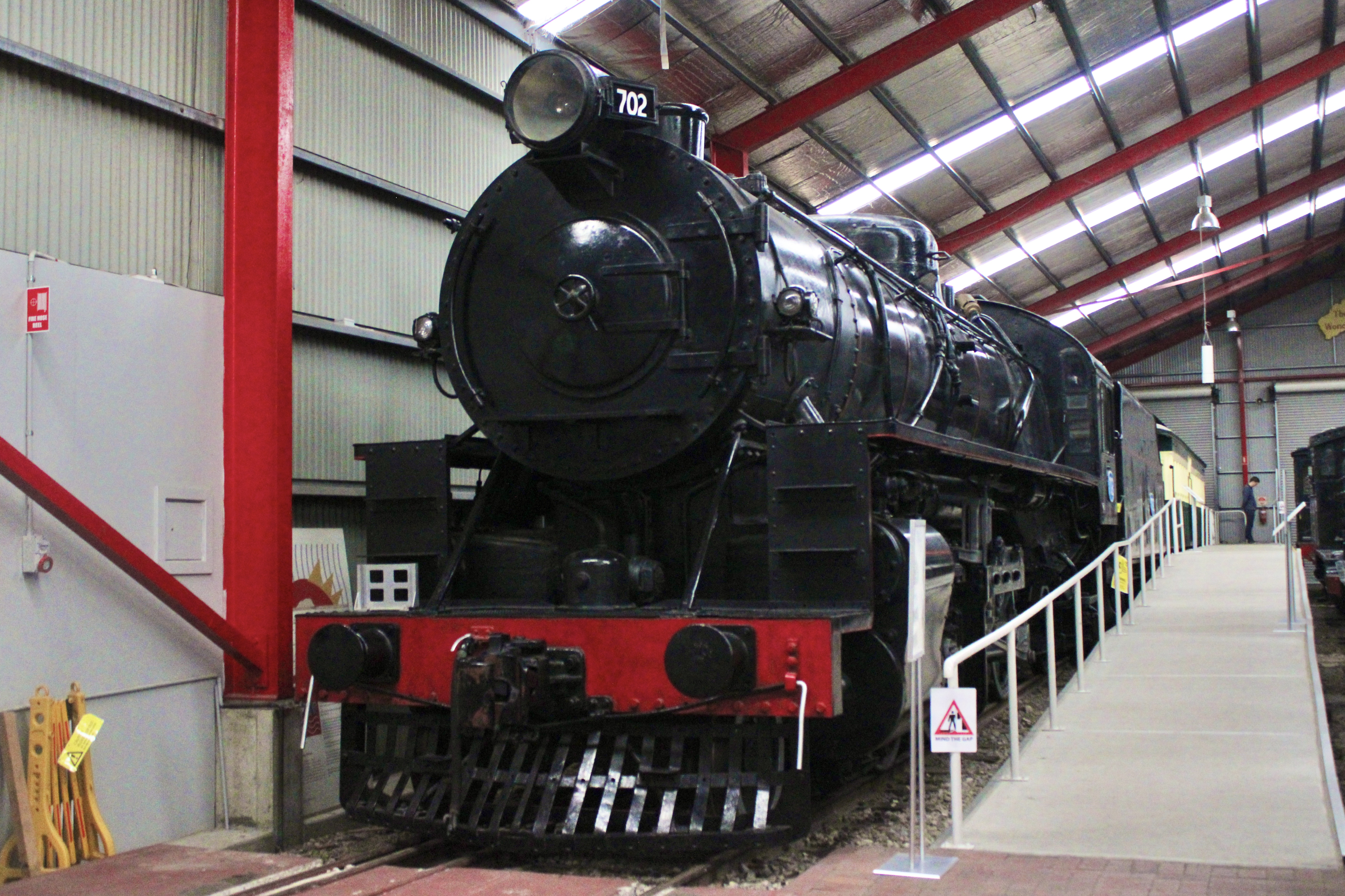
The sole surviving member of the class, 702 displayed at the National Railway Museum, Port Adelaide

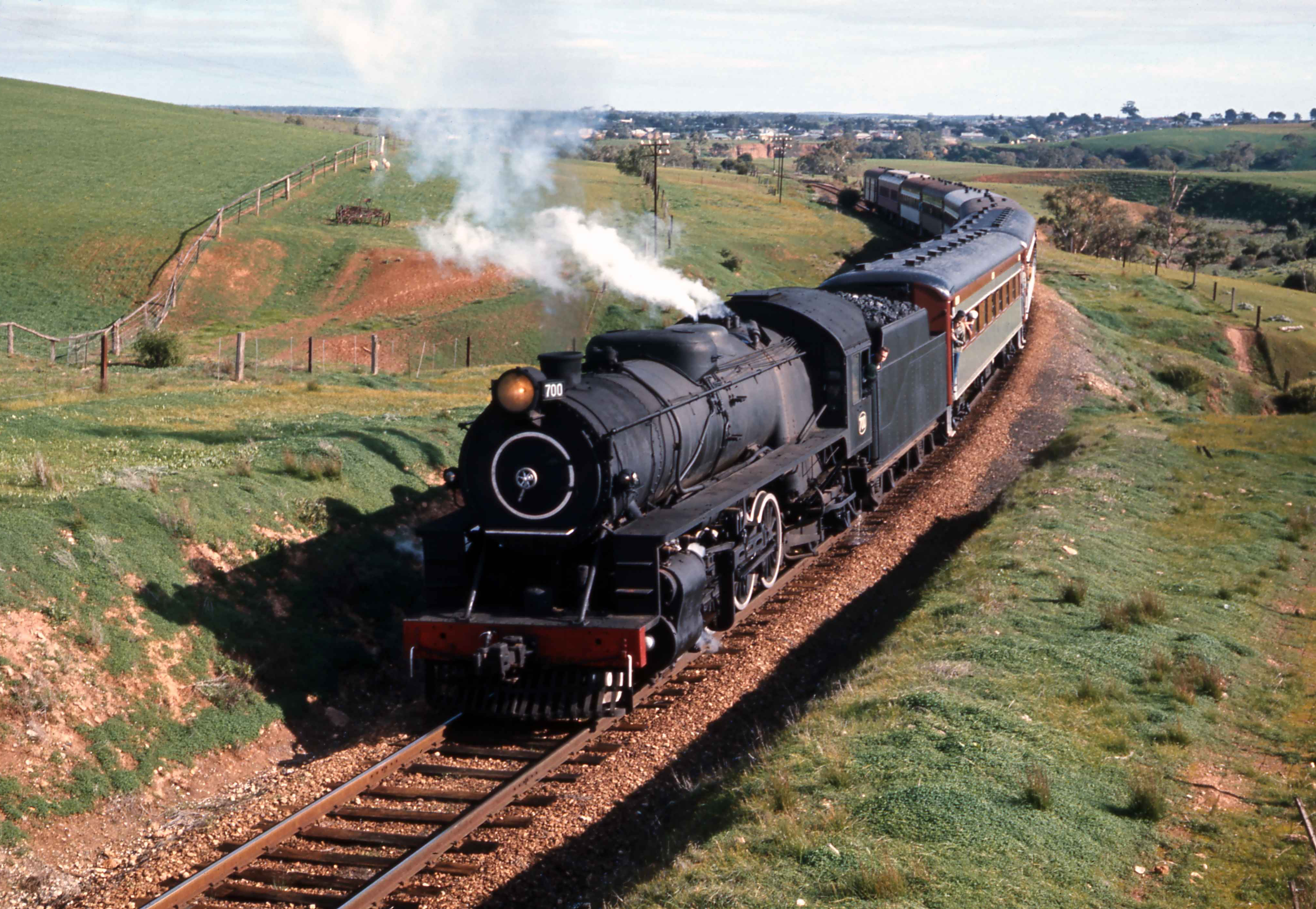
The class leader and last operating member of the class, 700 hauling an ARHS trip to Angaston, 1968

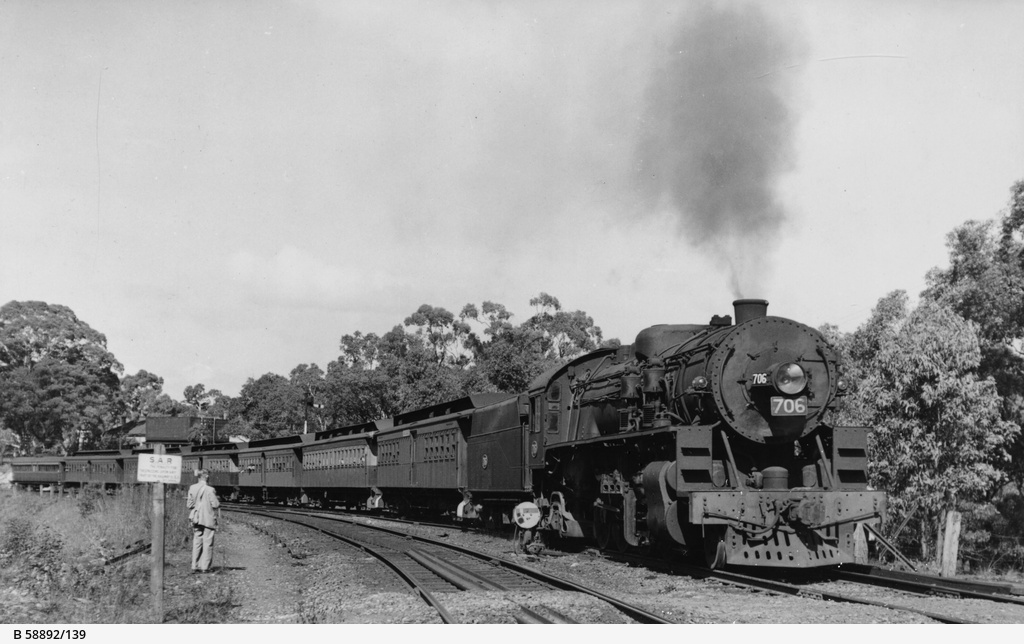
706 with a passenger train at Blackwood, 1952. Its centre-mounted headlight at the time made it easily distinguishable in external appearance from the rest of the class.

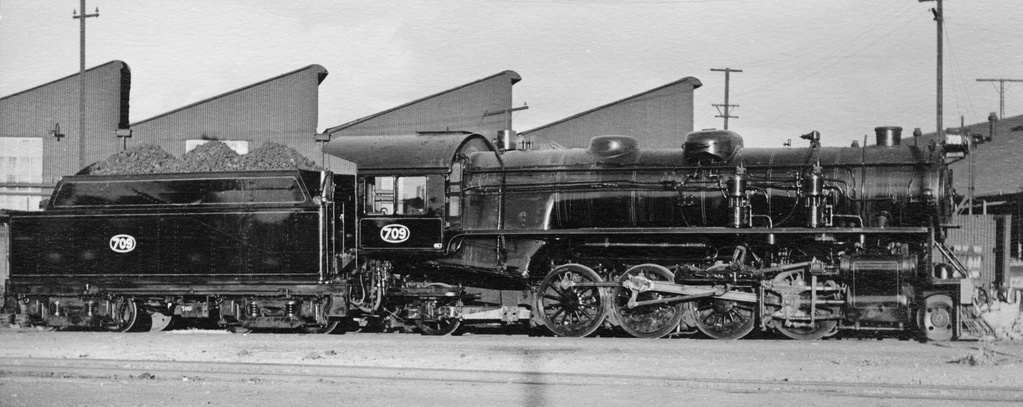
709 at Mile End, 1952

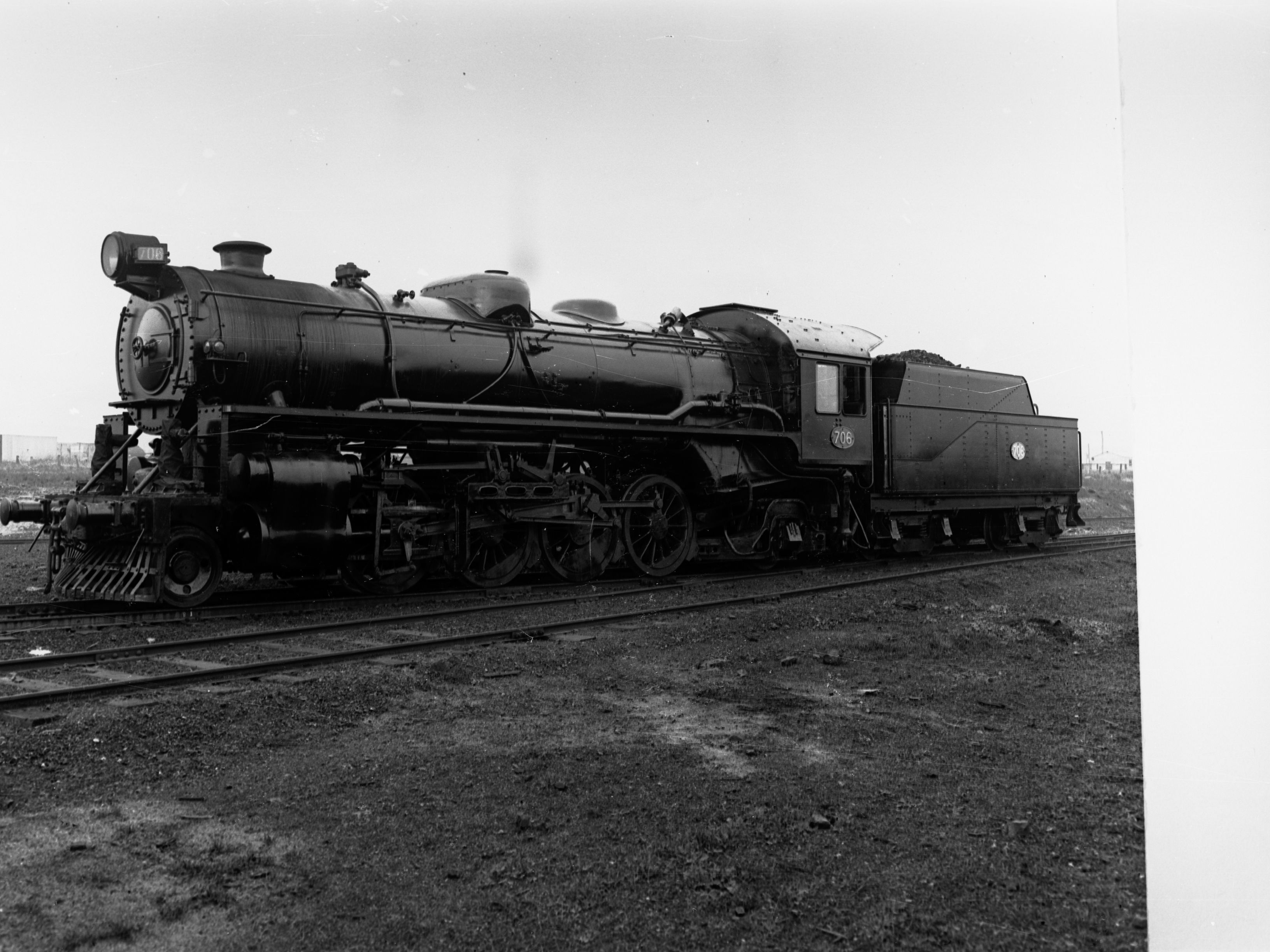
706 fitted with a booster (later removed), 1927

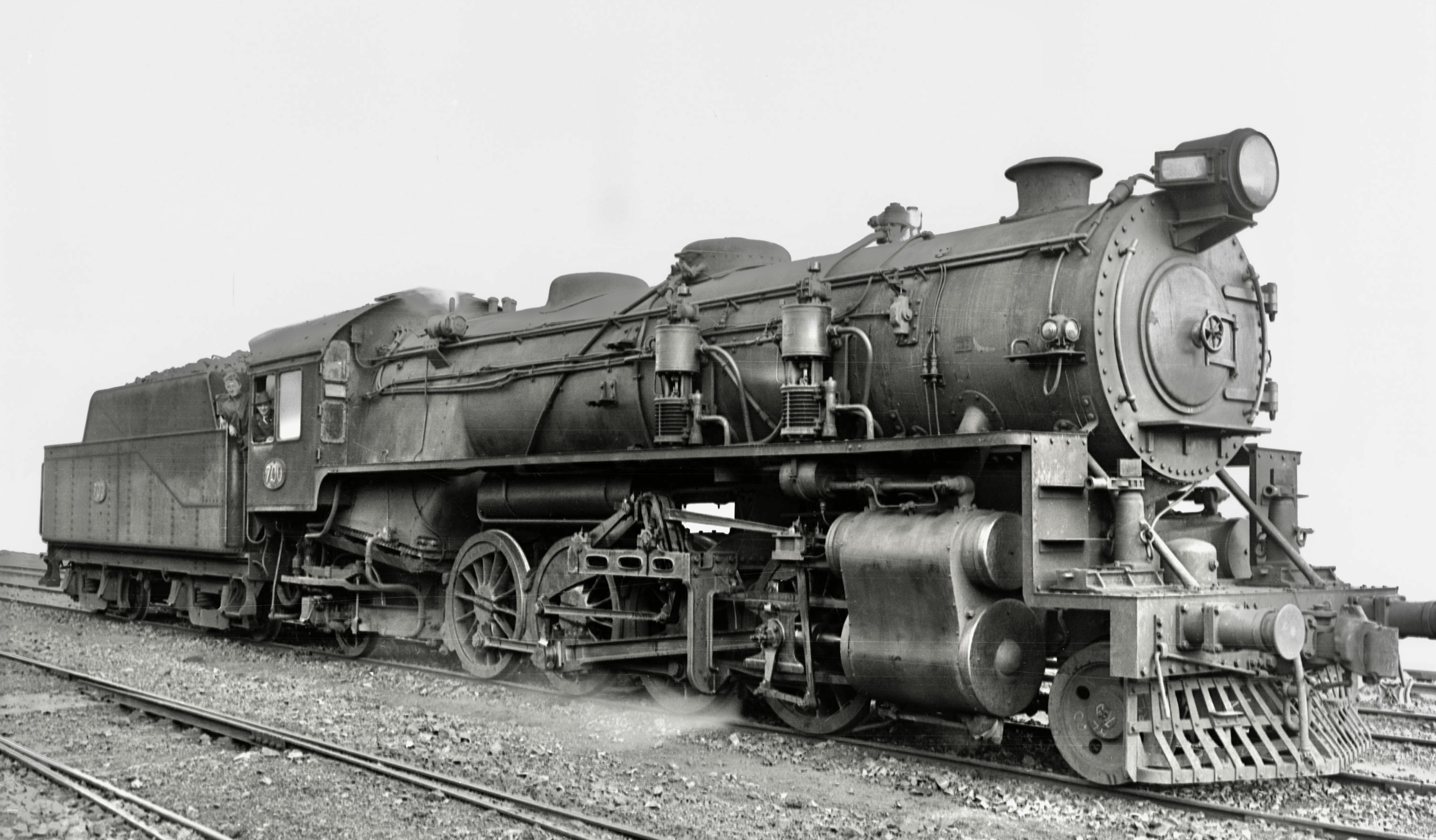
Class leader 700 at Mile End, 1926
