= Class 720 =

Class 720 or 720 class may refer to:

- British Rail Class 720
- New South Wales 620/720 class railcar
- South Australian Railways 720 class
