= Islington Railway Workshops =

Railway workshop in Adelaide, South Australia

Islington Workshops
- Country: Australia
- State: South Australia
- Established: 1883

The Islington Railway Workshops, known in the former South Australian Railways as Islington Works, are railway workshops in the northern suburbs of Adelaide, South Australia, on the western boundary of the suburb of Prospect. They were the chief railway workshops of the South Australian Railways, employing more than 2000 workers. Today, some railway-related companies operate there; part of the site is a large retail centre.

== History ==
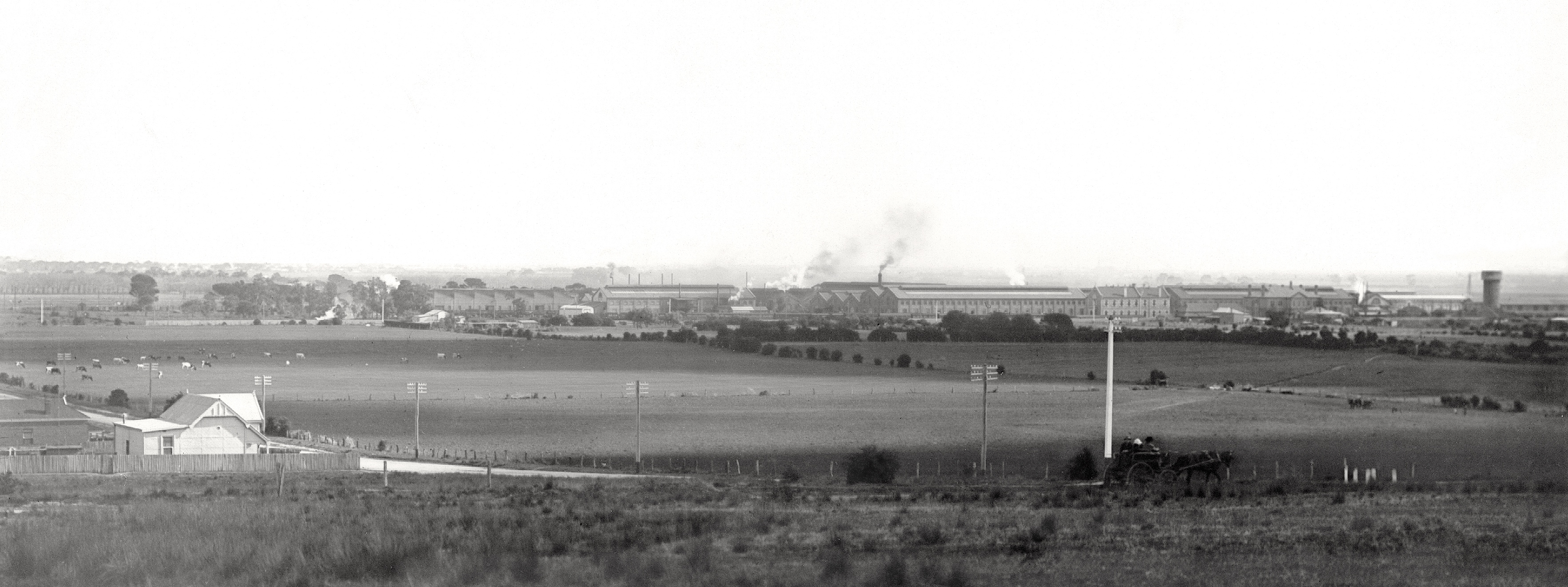
Islington workshops, where large numbers of locomotives and rolling stock were designed and built from 1883. Photo taken between 1915 and 1927, before the encroachment of Adelaide's suburbs.

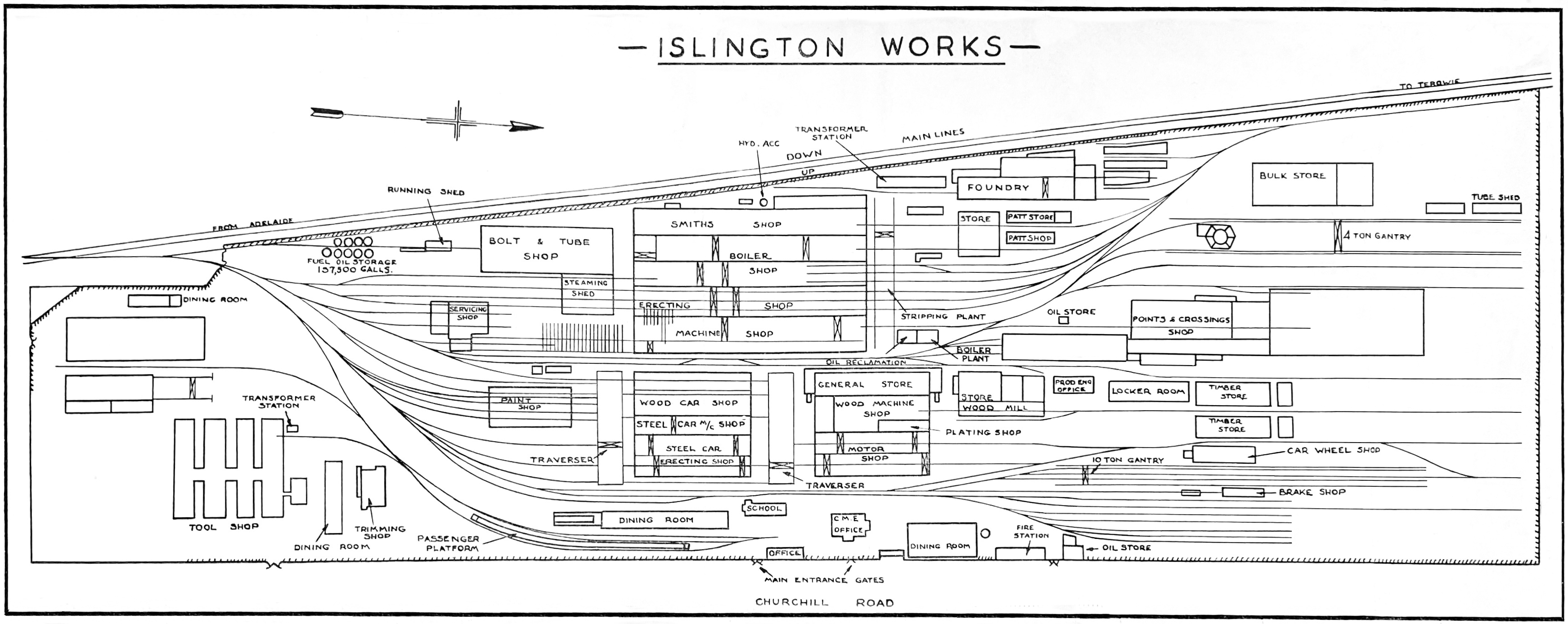
Buildings and track layout at Islington Workshops, about 1930. The many processes involved in rolling stock and steam locomotive design, construction, maintenance and repair are reflected in the names of the buildings.

In 1839, John Bentham Neales decided to develop his land into a new village, inspired by Colonel Light's design for Adelaide. The plan for Islington was publicized in the *SA Gazette & Colonial Register* on 23 March 1839, highlighting approximately 1000 small housing blocks and five public squares. An advertisement published on 13 April 1839 promoted the village's proximity to the parklands and the high road to Gawler, encouraging early applications from emigrants for the limited number of plots. By 1841, Islington had a population of seventy-seven, with twenty-five cottages built, each supplied with a well for water. In 1845, a church was constructed on a block purchased for £5, serving both religious and educational purposes. By 1880, the original church had become too small, and a larger church was built on land donated by John Chambers in Prospect, supplemented by a £10 contribution. In 1880, the decision was made to move the engine shed from Adelaide Railway Station to Islington due to the noise of railway maintenance disturbing the parliament members.

=== Islington Workshops ===
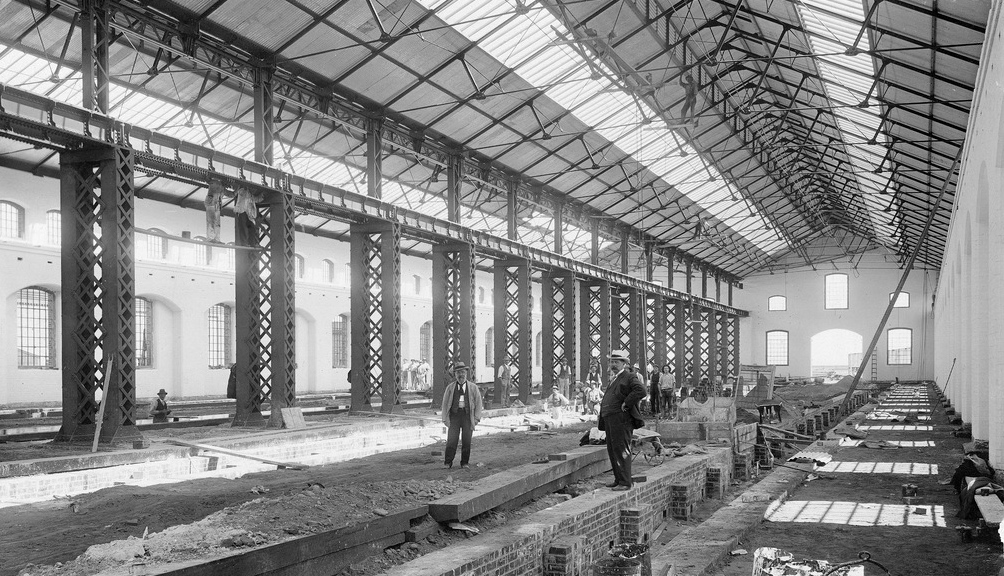
A larger erecting shop was built in 1902. This building was where the South Australian Railways assembled locomotives and rolling stock.

The Islington Workshops were a major railway workshop in Islington, South Australia, known for their significant role in the construction and maintenance of locomotives, carriages, and wagons. The Islington Workshops were established in 1884 and expanded over the years. The site originally covered five acres, and its operations began in 1880. The workshops grew significantly, with various additions and improvements made to handle the increasing demands of the South Australian Railways. In 1918, the water available throughout South Australia was generally unsatisfactory for locomotive purposes. To address this issue, the Chief Mechanical Engineer at Islington Workshops suggested a project to carry out chemical treatment of water from the Bundaleer reservoir. By 1929, the workshops had undergone significant reorganization under the Railway Rehabilitation Scheme instituted by Webb. This reorganization involved the demolition of old buildings and the construction of new ones to house the entire locomotive building and repair facility.

=== World War II Contributions ===
During World War II, the Islington Workshops played a crucial role in the production of military equipment. The workshops were fitted with modern machines and facilities, including several heavy vertical and horizontal milling machines, special lathes, drilling machines, and tool-grinders. After World War II, the layout of the shops was remodeled to facilitate workshop output and mass production methods for the construction of engines, freight wagons, and passenger cars. New modern machine tools and electrical power were utilized to drive all plants and new shops. The Islington Workshops were known for their extensive facilities and modern equipment. The machine-shop, measuring 300 ft. long by 150 ft. wide, was equipped with the latest tools and machines. The erecting shops, consisting of two buildings, were each 300 ft. long by 48 ft. 6 in. wide, and the boiler-shop comprised three bays, each 250 ft. long. The Islington Workshops remain a significant part of South Australia's industrial heritage. Despite the demolition of some original buildings, many of the new modern shops and facilities established during the Webb era continue to carry a heritage rating.

=== Production of the Machine-Gun Carrier ===
The machine-gun carrier production was managed by four main entities: Newport Workshops of the Victorian Railways, Islington Workshops of the South Australian Railways, Fitzroy Workshops of the Metropolitan Gas Company in Victoria, and the Ford Motor Company in Homebush, New South Wales. The carriers were designed in Britain and used imported engines from Ford. The Victorian Railway Department played a significant role in the production program. The Islington Workshops produced 1,560 machine-gun carriers and supplied parts for 5,583 more. With a history of defense manufacturing, Islington Workshops and other firms collaborated to meet the demands starting from December 1940.

=== Aircraft Manufacturing Responsibilities ===
The Islington Workshops in South Australia were tasked with creating the center plane and wings for aircraft. These components were part of a broader production effort that included several state railway workshops. Specifically, Chullora in New South Wales handled the front fuselage, stern frame, undercarriage, and engine nacelle, while Newport in Victoria managed the rear fuselage, tail assemblies, and other parts.

== Output ==
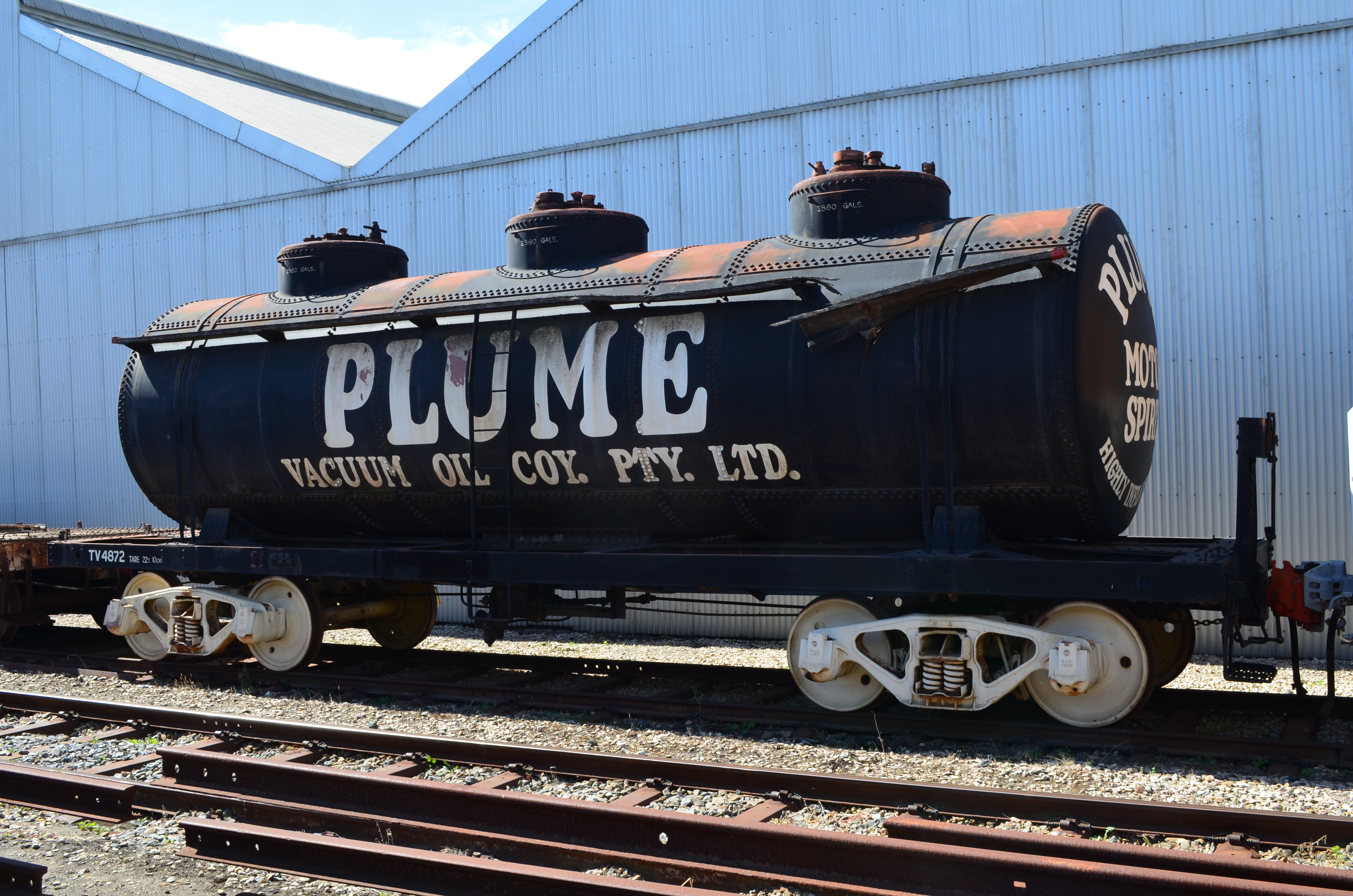
A fuel tank car of which many were built from 1929

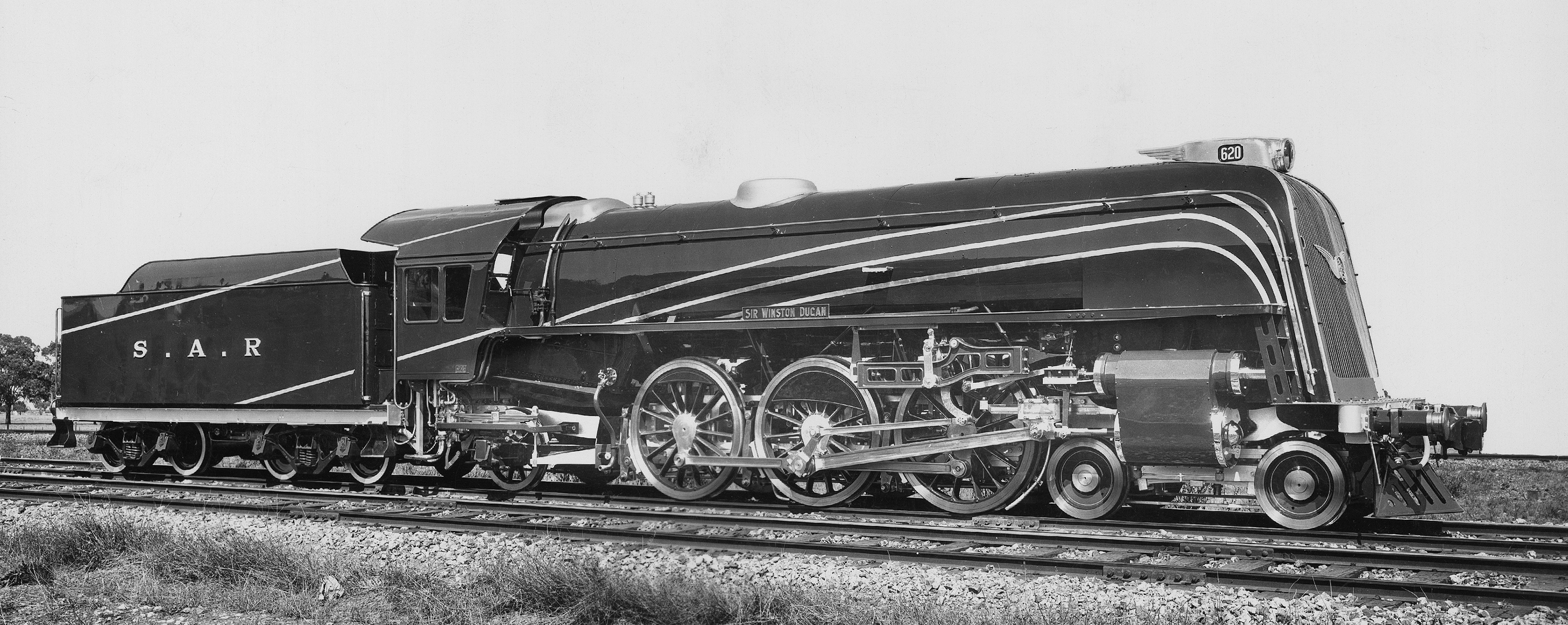
A 620 class locomotive, which went into service in 1936, was a light passenger locomotive. It was one of several classes of steam engines designed and built at Islington Workshops.

The Workshops built many of the locomotives and items of rolling stock that served the South Australian Railways, including:

- 14 R class steam locomotives
- 1 Y class steam locomotives
- 78 T class steam locomotives
- 2 Z class steam locomotives
- 12 520 class steam locomotives
- 10 620 class steam locomotives
- 10 710 class steam locomotives
- 17 720 class steam locomotives
- 2 350 class diesel locomotives
- 34 500 class diesel locomotives
- 10 900 class diesel locomotives
- 12 Brill 55 railcars
- 38 Brill 75 railcars
- 18 Bluebird railcars
- 111 Redhen railcars
- 9 RL class diesel locomotives

Islington workshops also built 13 Australian Standard Garratt articulated locomotives for the Queensland Railways and Western Australian Government Railways.

== Heritage listings ==
Nine surviving historic portions of the former workshops are listed on the South Australian Heritage Register. They are:

- the Chief Mechanical Engineer's Office
- the Fabrication Shop
- the Workshops Foundry
- the Apprentice School
- the Electrical Shop
- the Fabrication Shop Annex
- a section of the Front Fence
- the Time Office and Correspondence Room
- the Old Bulk Store

== Railway station ==
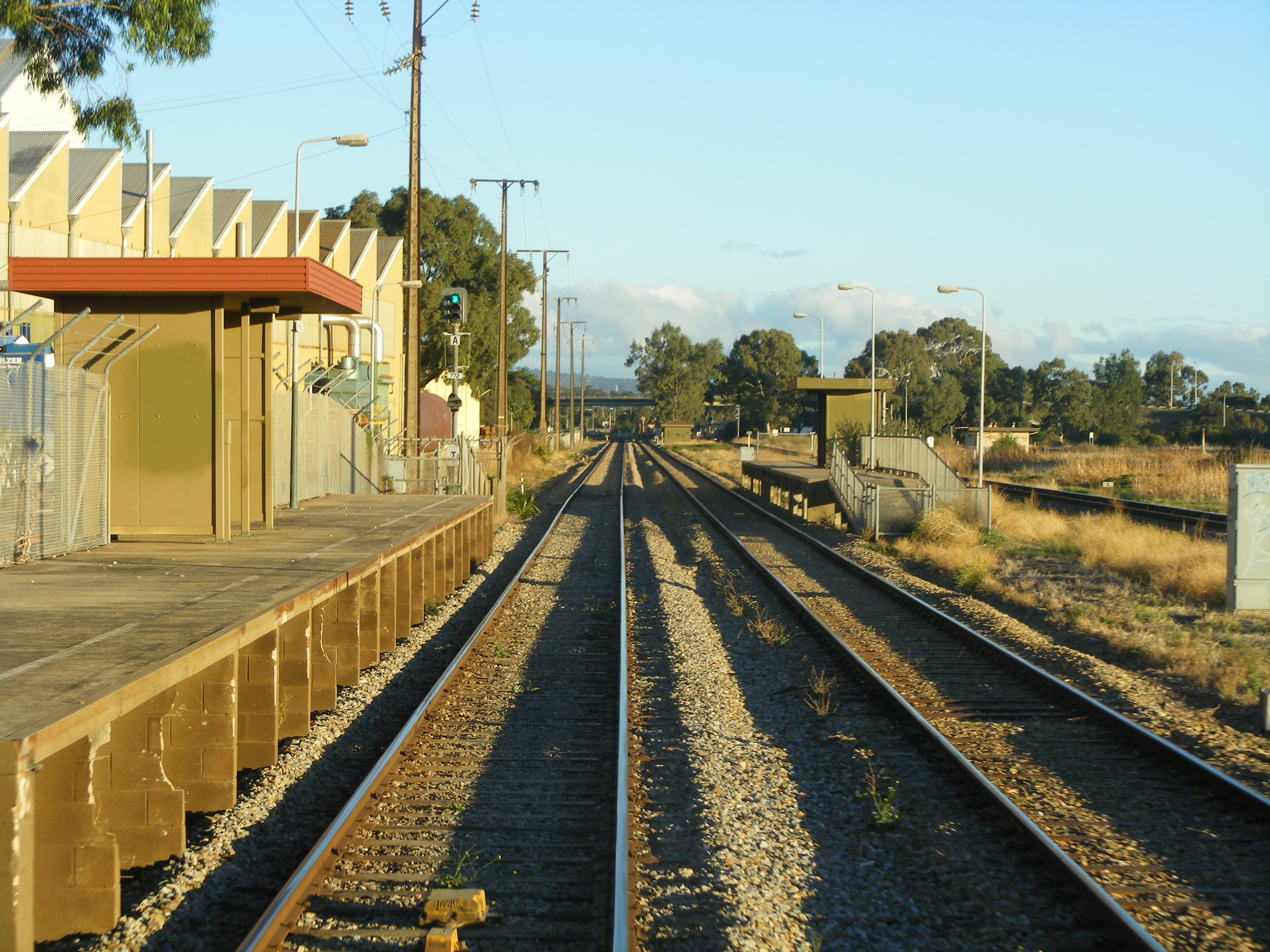
Islington Works Railway station

Islington Works Railway station formerly served the yards. It was located on the Gawler railway line to serve the adjacent Islington Railway Workshops. The station was closed in 2000, and demolished in 2020.
