= South Australian Railways 710 class =

Class of Australian 2-8-2 locomotives

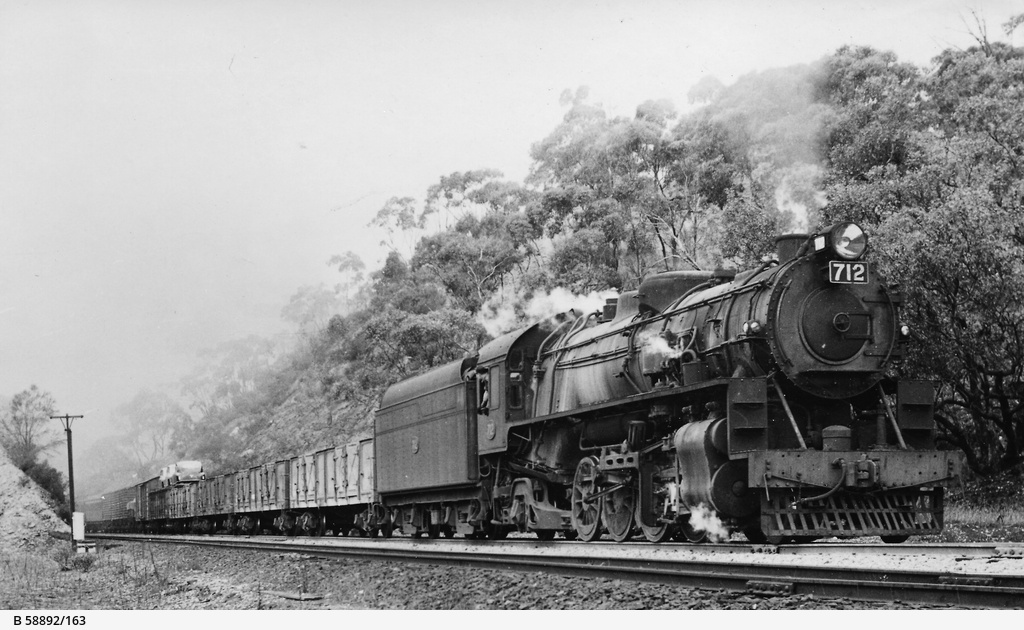
- 712 at Eden Hills in 1951
Type and origin
- Power type: Steam
- Designer: Fred Shea
- Builder: Islington Railway Workshops
- Serial number: 44-53
- Build date: 1928-1929
- Total produced: 10
Specifications
- Configuration
  - Whyte: 2-8-2 1′D1′ 2′2′
- Gauge: 1,600 mm (5 ft 3 in)
- Leading dia.: 2 ft 9 in (838 mm)
- Driver dia.: 4 ft 9 in (1,448 mm)
- Trailing dia.: 3 ft 6 in (1,067 mm)
- Length: 73 ft 2 in (22.30 m)
- Height: 13 ft 6 1/2 in (4,127.5 mm)
- Axle load: 18 long tons 13 cwt (41,800 lb or 18.9 t)
- Total weight: 175 long tons 75 cwt (400,400 lb or 181.6 t)
- Fuel type: Coal; Oil
- Fuel capacity: 17 long tons 0 cwt (38,100 lb or 17.3 t)
- Water cap.: 5,400 imp gal (6,500 US gal; 25,000 L)
- Firebox
  - Grate area: 47 sq ft (4.4 m^{2})
- Boiler pressure: 200 psi (1,379 kPa)
- Heating surface
  - Firebox: 195 sq ft (18.1 m^{2}); 227 sq ft (21.1 m^{2}) with syphons fitted
  - Tubes: 2,206 sq ft (204.9 m^{2})
- Superheater
  - Heating area: 618 sq ft (57.4 m^{2})
- Cylinders: 2
- Cylinder size: 22 in × 28 in (559 mm × 711 mm)
- Valve gear: Walschaerts valve gear
- Valve type: Piston
Performance figures
- Tractive effort: 40,418 lbf (179.79 kN); 48,418 lbf (215.37 kN) with booster
- Factor of adh.: 4.0
Career
- Operators: South Australian Railways
- Class: 710
- Number in class: 10
- Numbers: 710-719
- First run: 25/10/1928
- Last run: 1968
- Withdrawn: 1961-1968
- Scrapped: 1962-1968
- Disposition: All scrapped

The South Australian Railways 710 class was a class of 2-8-2 steam locomotives operated by the South Australian Railways.

== History ==
=== Delivery and differences from original 700 design ===
The 710 class were built by the Islington Railway Workshops as a modified version of the Armstrong Whitworth built 700 class locomotives. Class leader 710 was unveiled in October 1928 with the name 'Sir Alexander Ruthven', who was the governor of South Australia at the time. the other named 710 class locomotive was 714, named 'Rotarian' as a Rotary Club luncheon was being held when the locomotive was completed.

Like the 700s, they usually operated on freight trains but also hauled passenger trains.

Some modifications from the original 700 design include a different tender design, a different trailing bogie design known as a cast 'Delta' bogie with a booster incorporated into it, a front number plate mounted below the headlight, a front-end throttle, relocation of the injectors from the inside of the cab to the outside on the firebox sides, a cross-compound air compressor instead of a single-stage air compressor, and thermic syphons in the firebox.

719 received a Worthington BL2 feed-water heater when it was built, and was the only SAR locomotive to have one installed. The feed-water heater was removed from the locomotive in 1943.

=== Track restrictions and modifications ===
The 710s were fitted with boosters after one was successfully trialed on 700 class locomotive 706. However, the addition of the booster meant that the trailing bogie had an excessive axle load, and so all 710s and 706 were barred from operating on 60lb lines in 1930. The following year, 714 had its booster removed so it would be allowed to work on the 60lb lines again, alleviating a power shortage caused by the ban.

When the 720 class locomotives were banned from 60lb lines, causing another shortage of power on the 60 lb lines, so more 710s had boosters removed. The remaining 710s had the booster exhaust redirected away from the main blast-pipe and into a separate exhaust near the cab. In 1936, all SAR locomotives fitted with boosters had the letter B added onto their classification. With the booster 710s now being known as the 710Bs, they were distinguished from non-booster 710s.

The last 710Bs had their boosters removed in 1938, allowing them to work across 60lb lines again. However, the non-booster 710s were facing increasing speed, coal and water restrictions on these lines during the decade and they were banned from the Pinnaroo and Barmera lines later that year. They were allowed again in later years, and they were also allowed to operate on the Outer Harbor, Port Dock, and Semaphore lines following platform widening to provide sufficient space for Redhen railcars. However, the gap was not sufficient to allow the 700s to run at track speed past the platforms and so they were subject to severe speed restrictions. 718 operated a tour train on the Outer Harbor line in 1965 and also ran on the Hendon line, which branches off the Grange line at Albert Park. As 710s were generally not allowed on the Grange and Hendon lines, special permission had to be granted from the SAR.

In 1953, 713 had a coal pusher fitted. It was the only 710 to receive one.

=== Withdrawal ===
The first two were withdrawn in July 1961 with the remainder replaced as 830 diesel locomotives entered service. 718 was the last in service, being withdrawn after a series of farewell tours named 'Sayonara Mikado', which occurred across the weekend of 1-2 June, 1968. 700 hauled the first 'Sayonara Mikado' trip which went to Angaston, and 718 hauled the second trip to Victor Harbor. 700 joined the tour to cover for a failed Rx224. The 2 locomotives double-headed back to Adelaide, hours behind schedule due to 718 derailing on the Victor Harbor turntable, and were withdrawn from service after arriving in the early hours of 3 June. All 710s were scrapped but 700 class locomotive 702, similar to the 710s has been preserved by the National Railway Museum, Port Adelaide.

== Class list ==
Number	Date in Service	Date Withdrawn/Condemned	Mileage	Name
710	25 October 1928	16 July 1963	656,625 mi (1,056,736 km)	Sir Alexander Ruthven
711	24 November 1928	16 July 1963	692,396 mi (1,114,303 km)	-
712	18 December 1928	6 July 1961	602,139 mi (969,049 km)	-
713	18 February 1929	25 November 1965	654,411 mi (1,053,172 km)	-
714	15 March 1929	9 July 1964	653,847 mi (1,052,265 km)	Rotarian
715	6 May 1929	9 July 1962	612,101 mi (985,081 km)	-
716	25 May 1929	9 July 1964	638,180 mi (1,027,051 km)	-
717	21 June 1929	7 September 1967	619,348 mi (996,744 km)	-
718	1 July 1929	3 June 1968	617,082 mi (993,097 km)	-
719	1 August 1929	16 July 1963	611,805 mi (984,605 km)	-

== Gallery ==
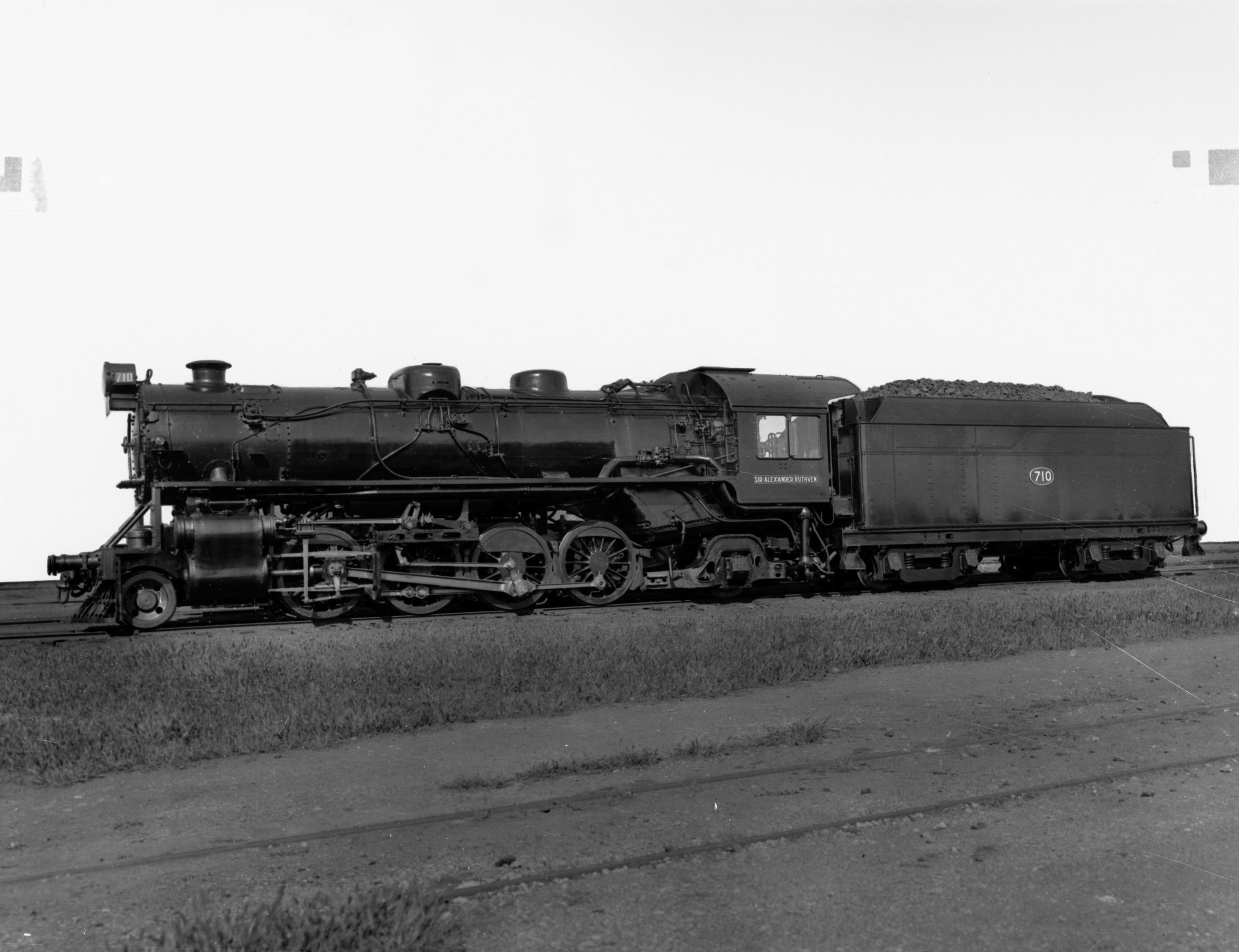
710 'Sir Alexander Ruthven' at Islington, 1928

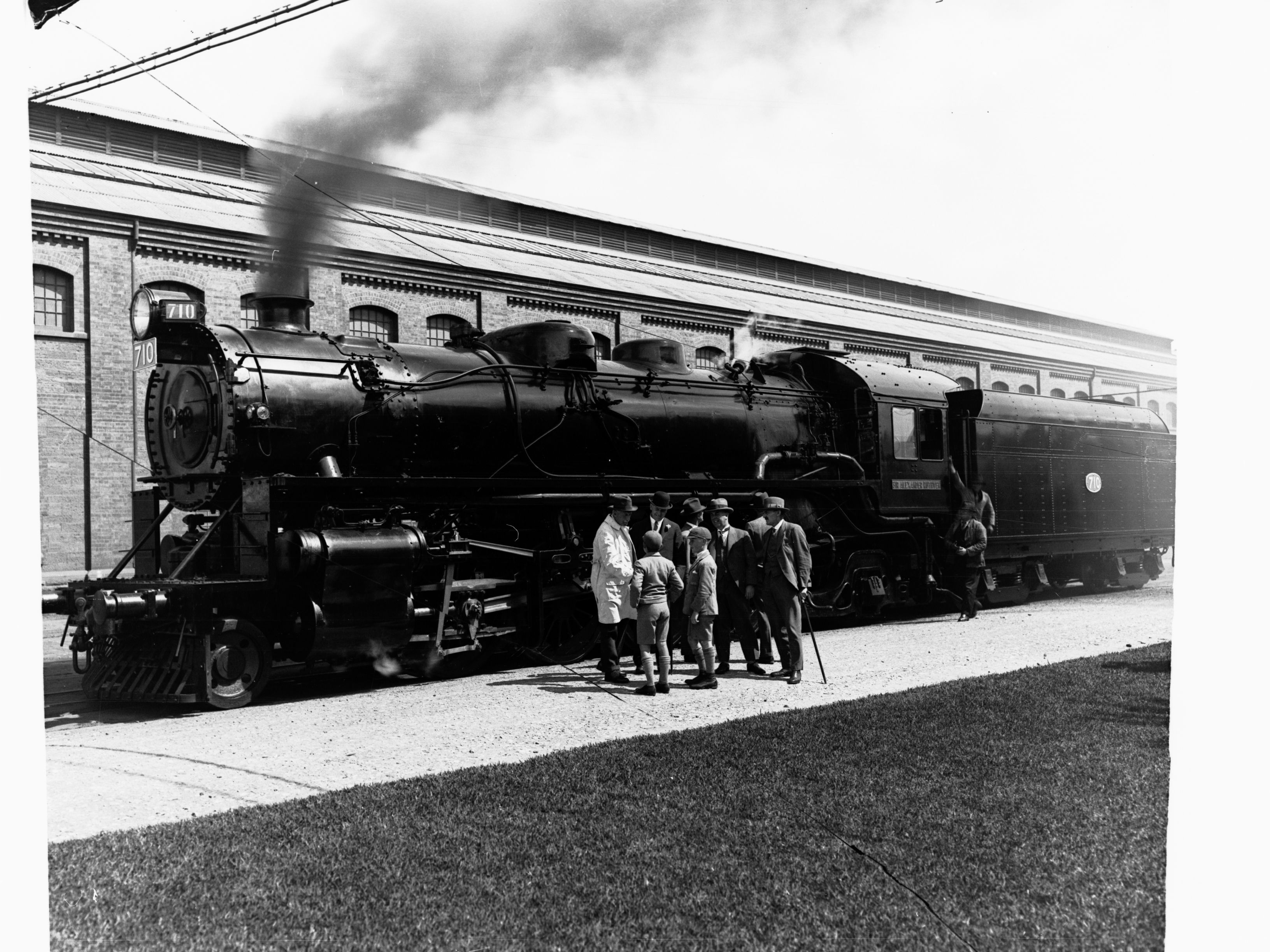
Sir Alexander and party inspecting 710 at Islington

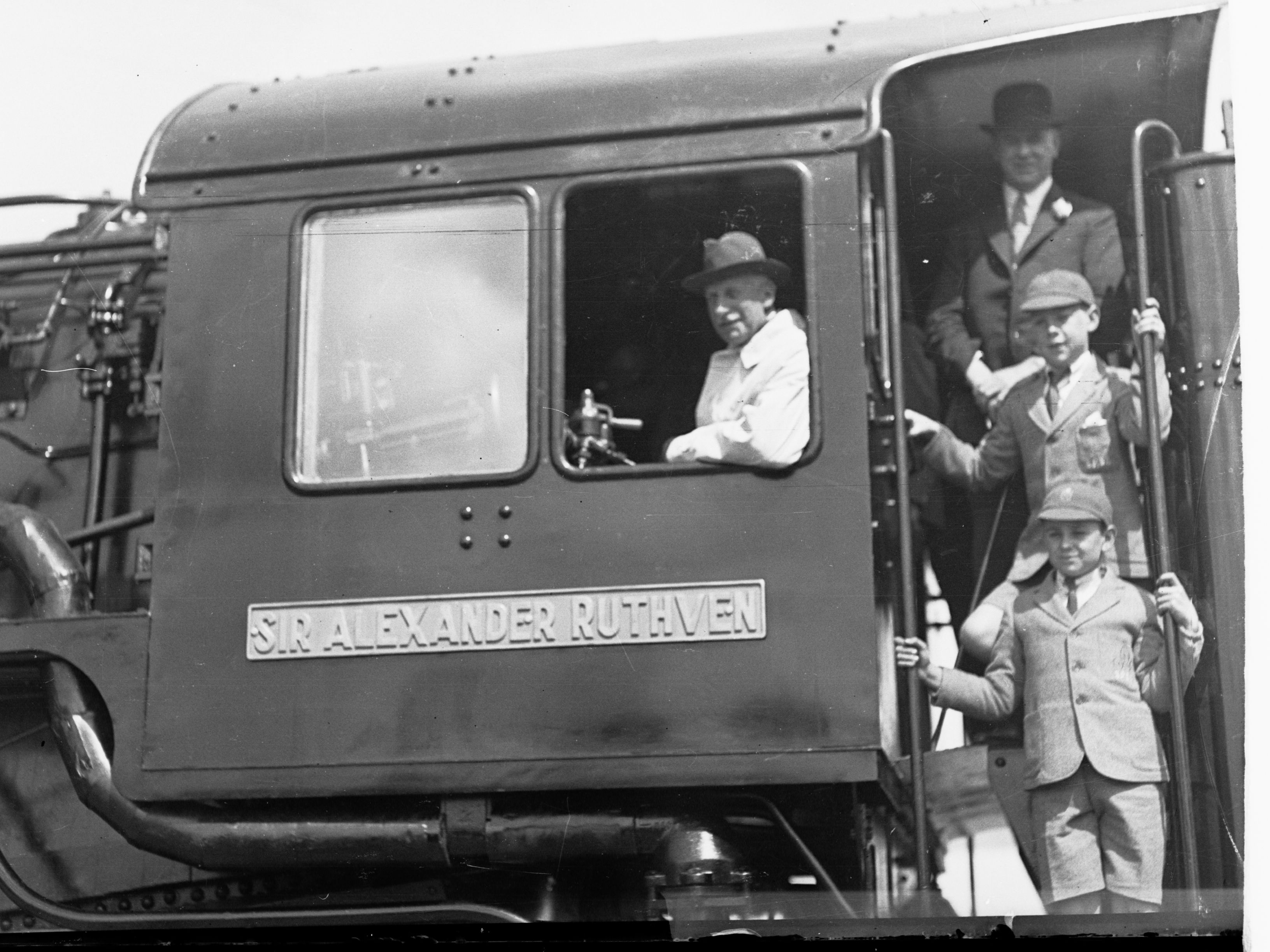
Sir Alexander in the cab of his namesake locomotive

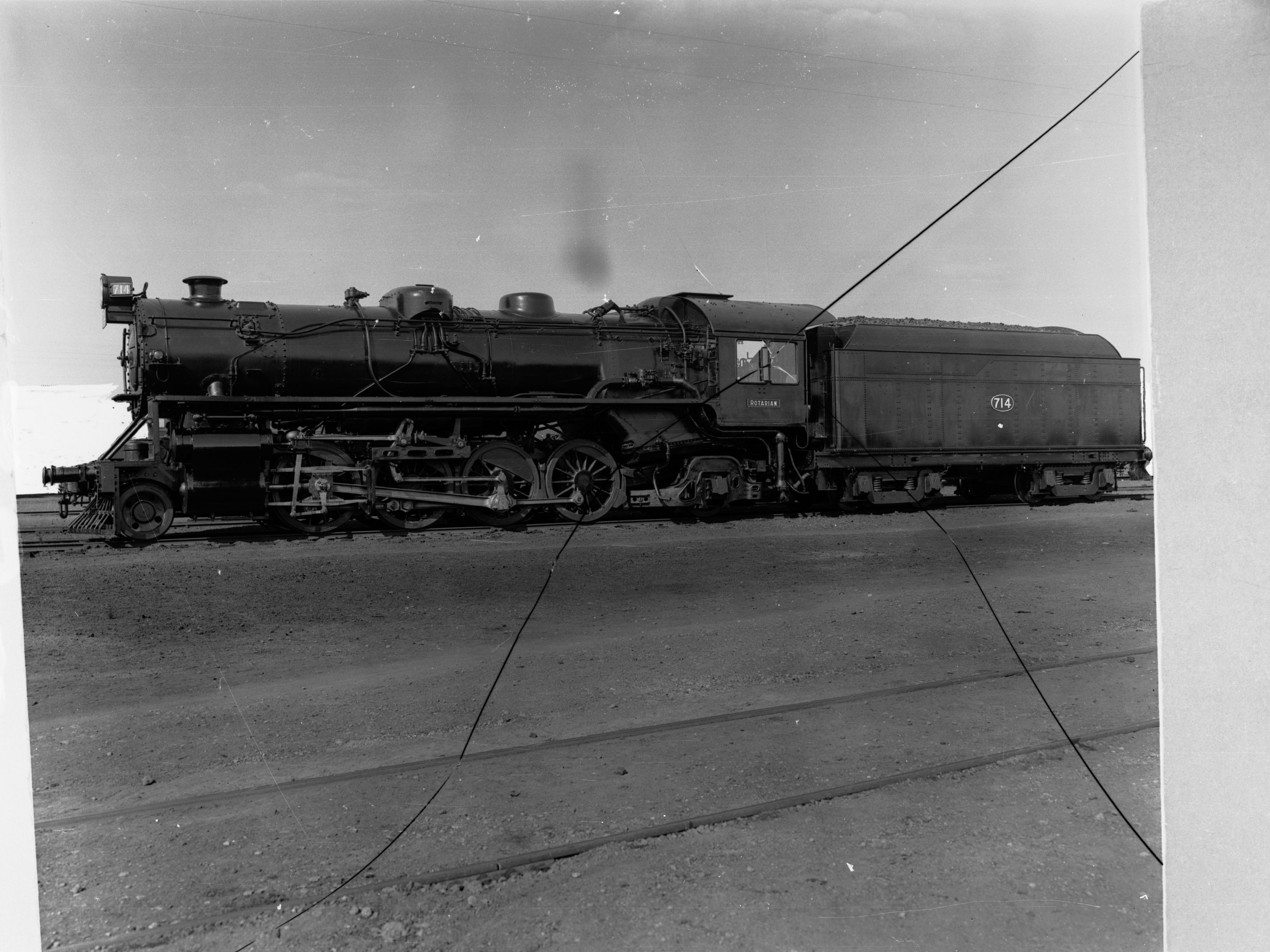
714 'Rotarian', 1929
