= GSR Class 700 =

1930s Irish 0-6-0 locomotive classes

GSR 700 and 710 Classes
Type and origin
- Power type: Steam
- Designer: J. R. Bazin (700); A. W. Harty (710)
- Builder: Inchicore
- Build date: 1929, 1934—1935
- Total produced: 15 (700:5; 710:10)
Specifications
- Configuration
  - Whyte: 0-6-0
- Gauge: 5 ft 3 in (1,600 mm)
- Driver dia.: 5 ft 1 3/4 in (1,568 mm)
- Length: 25 ft 3 3/4 in (7,715 mm) (700); 27 ft 6 3/4 in (8,401 mm) (710)
- Loco weight: 41 long tons (42 t) (700); 43 long tons (44 t) (710)
- Water cap.: 3,345 imp gal (15,210 L; 4,017 US gal)
- Boiler pressure: 160 lbf/in^{2} (1.10 MPa)
- Cylinders: 2
- Cylinder size: 18 in × 24 in (457 mm × 610 mm)
Performance figures
- Tractive effort: 17,130 lbf (76.20 kN)
Career
- Operators: Great Southern Railways (GSR); CIÉ
- Class: J15a/J15b (700/710) (Inchicore)
- Number in class: 5 (700); 10 (710)
- Numbers: 700-704, 710-719
- Locale: Ireland
- Withdrawn: 1955—1963

The Great Southern Railways (GSR) Class 700 consisted of five 0-6-0 locomotives built by Inchicore railway works in 1929 and were the last locomotives designed by J. R. Bazin. The Class 710 consisted of ten 0-6-0 locomotives built by Inchicore railway works in 1934.

== History ==
=== Class 700 ===
The design was more traditional with a saturated Belpaire boiler that was unique to the 700 class. It was also fitted with slide valves as opposed to piston valves. The tenders used initially were those reallocated from withdrawn 360 class 4-6-0. A more modern feature was underslung springs.

Operationally the need for the class has subsequently been questioned and speculation has arisen that it was to use up surplus type 60 boilers. This class seems to have compared poorly with the older 101 Class when especially when the latter were fitted with superheated boilers, possibly due to an inadequate heating surface leading to high coal and water consumption.

=== Class 710 ===
They were more modern than the five Class 700 0-6-0 introduced in 1929 though being more modern with piston valves and a type Z superheatered boiler. They could be thought of as a tender version of the GSR Class 670 0-6-2T introduced in 1933 but with smaller wheels more suited to branch and goods work. Whilst intended as a modern addition to the 101 class they seemed to gain a reputation as poor steamers and heavy on coal and water. Following their introduction the GSR resumed rebuilding the 101 class with the Z-type superheated boiler

==== Model ====
There is a detailed O Gauge model of engine 710 in the Fry model railway collection.
