= GSR Class 850 =

GSR 850 Class
Type and origin
- Power type: Steam
- Designer: J. R. Bazin
- Builder: Inchicore
- Build date: 1928
- Total produced: 1
Specifications
- Configuration
  - Whyte: 2-6-2T
- Gauge: 5 ft 3 in (1,600 mm)
- Leading dia.: 3 ft 1 in (940 mm)
- Driver dia.: 5 ft 6 in (1,680 mm)
- Trailing dia.: 3 ft 0 in (910 mm)
- Length: 39 ft 2 1/2 in (11,951 mm)
- Adhesive weight: 47.5 long tons (48.3 t)
- Loco weight: 71 long tons (72 t)
- Water cap.: 1,700 imp gal (7,700 L; 2,000 US gal)
- Boiler pressure: 260 lbf/in^{2} (1.79 MPa)
- Heating surface
  - Firebox: 119 sq ft (11.1 m^{2})
- Superheater: Belpaire
- Cylinders: 2
- Cylinder size: 17 1/2 in × 28 in (444 mm × 711 mm)
- Valve gear: Walschaerts
Performance figures
- Tractive effort: 17,700 lbf (78.73 kN)
Career
- Operators: Great Southern Railways (GSR); CIÉ
- Class: P1 (Inchicore)
- Power class: H/HT
- Number in class: 1
- Numbers: 850
- Locale: Ireland
- Withdrawn: 1955

The Great Southern Railways (GSR) Class 850 consisted of a single 2-6-2T tank locomotive built by Inchicore railway works in 1927, the sole example carrying the same number as the class. It was the first locomotive designed and built by the GSR since it was formed.

== Design ==
The design incorporated elements while retaining some features typical of previous Inchicore engines. It was suggested that parts of the last unaccounted for Class 393 kit supplied from Woolwich may have been incorporated into the design.

== Service ==
The locomotive worked Dublin—Bray—Greystones services and particularly was noted for regular appearances on the 17:07 Greystones express and Dún Laoghaire pier for the boat connections. It also had a short spell on Waterford—Limerick services in the 1930s. The locomotive was powerful but was prone to a rolling motion at speed. Number 850 was noted for long and frequent periods out of service for repairs.

== Incidents ==
In 1946 the locomotive fell into the turntable pit outside the Dublin Harcourt Street railway station and required extensive repairs.
