= South Australian Railways 720 class =

Class of Australian 2-8-4 locomotives

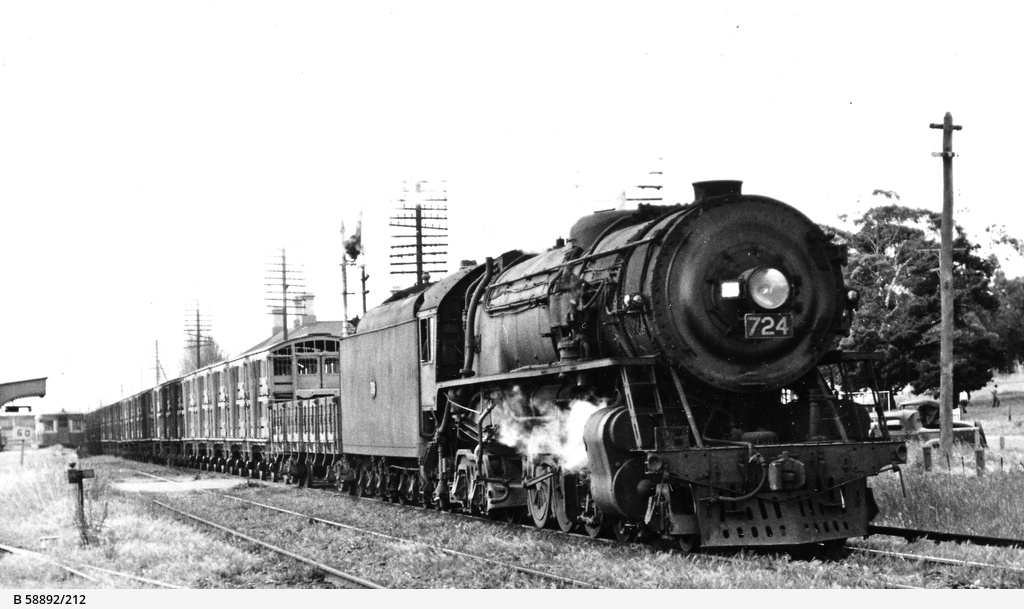
- 724 at North Adelaide station in 1952
Type and origin
- Power type: Steam
- Designer: Fred Shea
- Builder: Islington Railway Workshops
- Build date: 1930-1943
- Total produced: 17
Specifications
- Configuration
  - Whyte: 2-8-4 1′D2′ 3′3′
- Gauge: 1,600 mm (5 ft 3 in)
- Leading dia.: 2 ft 9 in (838 mm)
- Driver dia.: 4 ft 9 in (1,448 mm)
- Trailing dia.: 3 ft 0 in (914 mm); 3 ft 6 in (1,067 mm)
- Length: 83 ft 6 in (25.45 m)
- Height: 13 ft 11 5/8 in (4,256.1 mm)
- Axle load: 19.85 long tons 0 cwt (44,500 lb or 20.2 t)
- Adhesive weight: 77.10 long tons 0 cwt (172,700 lb or 78.3 t)
- Loco weight: 123.80 long tons 0 cwt (277,300 lb or 125.8 t)
- Tender weight: 104.00 long tons 0 cwt (233,000 lb or 105.7 t)
- Total weight: 227 long tons 4 cwt (508,900 lb or 230.8 t)
- Fuel type: Coal; Oil
- Fuel capacity: 17 long tons 0 cwt (38,100 lb or 17.3 t); 3,060 imp gal (3,670 US gal; 13,900 L) oil (locos converted to oil burning only)
- Water cap.: 9,000 imp gal (11,000 US gal; 41,000 L); 9,400 imp gal (11,300 US gal; 43,000 L) (when oil fired)
- Firebox
  - Grate area: 59.5 sq ft (5.53 m^{2})
- Boiler pressure: 215 psi (1,482 kPa)
- Heating surface
  - Firebox: 360 sq ft (33 m^{2})
  - Tubes: 2,615 sq ft (242.9 m^{2})
- Superheater
  - Heating area: 751 sq ft (69.8 m^{2})
- Cylinders: 2
- Cylinder size: 22 in × 28 in (559 mm × 711 mm)
- Valve gear: Walschaerts valve gear
- Valve type: Piston
Performance figures
- Tractive effort: 43,450 lbf (193.28 kN); 52,000 lbf (231.31 kN) with booster engine cut in
- Factor of adh.: 4.0
Career
- Operators: South Australian Railways
- Class: 720
- Number in class: 17
- Numbers: 720-736
- First run: 26/11/1930
- Withdrawn: 1958-1960
- Scrapped: 1958-1963
- Disposition: All scrapped

The South Australian Railways 720 class was a class of 2-8-4 steam locomotives operated by the South Australian Railways.

== Design ==
The 720 class were built by the South Australian Railways as an improved version of the 710 class locomotives. The cylinders and running gear were broadly similar, but the boiler was enlarged and its pressure raised from 200 psi to 215 psi. The grate area was increased by nearly a third.

The 710 had been fitted with a Franklin C-2 booster engine on the trailing truck and this was repeated for the 720. However the additional weight of the booster had led to axle load problems on the lines laid with lighter 60 lb rail and some had their boosters removed. Partly to reduce this axle load, partly to support the increased weight of the enlarged firebox, the 720 changed from the 710's 2-8-2 Mikado wheel arrangement to a 2-8-4 Berkshire. The trailing wheels of this bogie were of different sizes, the larger rear wheels being driven by the booster and a smaller wheelset used under the front of the ashpan to give more clearance.

== History ==
The initial order was for five locomotives. They were intended to operate on the lighter broad gauge lines, but after they began to spread rails, they were confined to the heavier lines. A further twelve were built between 1938 and 1943. The final twelve differed in having streamlined valances and boiler lagging tinware. Coal shortages after World War II saw 14 converted to burn oil. All were later converted back to coal burners.

The last were withdrawn in April 1960.

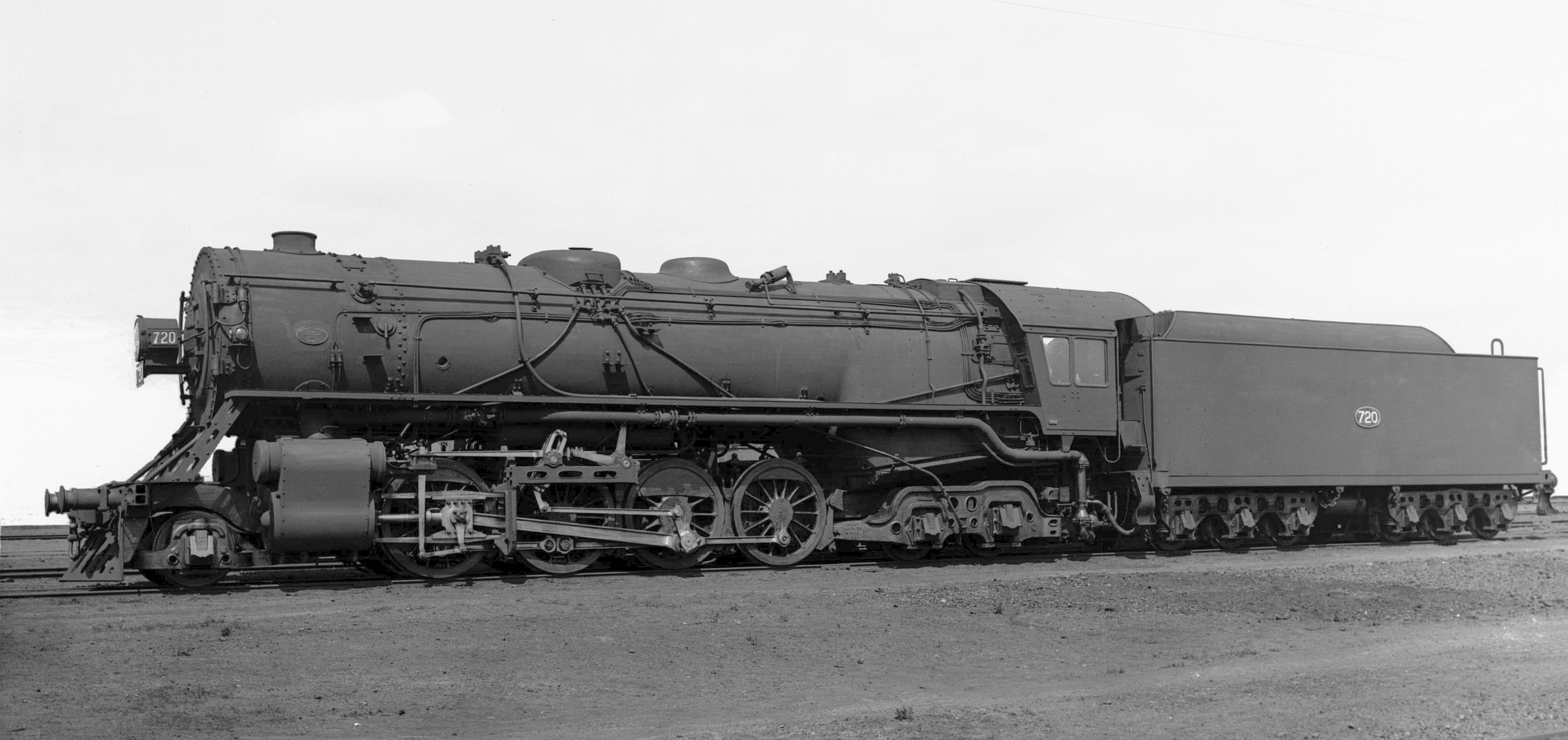
Locomotive 720 at Islington Railway Workshops.
